= 1744 in Sweden =

- Years in Sweden: 1741 1742 1743 1744 1745 1746 1747
- Centuries: 17th century · 18th century · 19th century
- Decades: 1710s 1720s 1730s 1740s 1750s 1760s 1770s
- Years: 1741 1742 1743 1744 1745 1746 1747

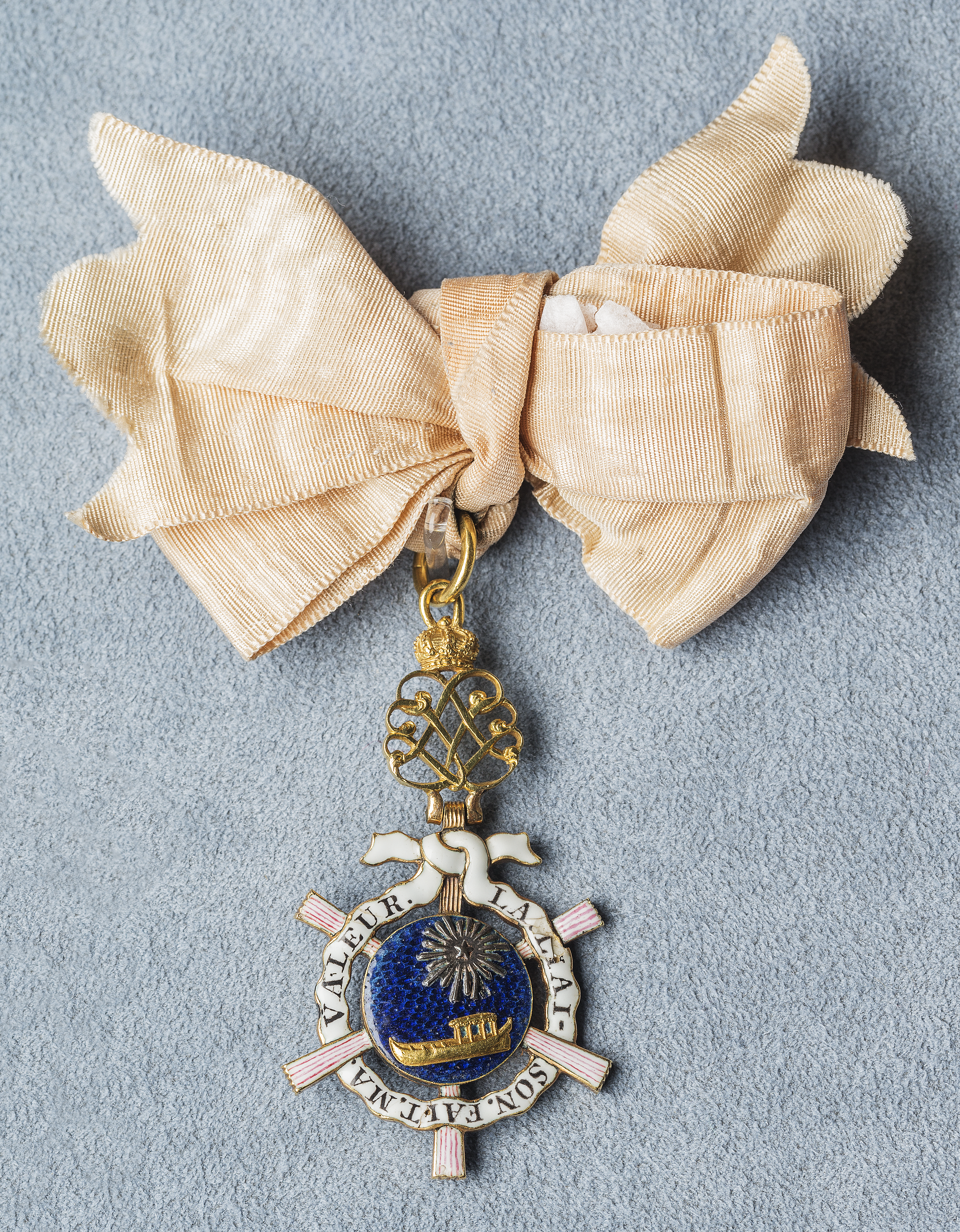
Order of Harmonie

Events from the year 1744 in Sweden

== Incumbents ==
- Monarch – Frederick I

== Events ==
- 30 January - Execution of Skinnar Per Andersson.
- March - The threatening war with Denmark is prevented by a treaty between Sweden and Denmark.
- July - The Empire of Russia agree to recall their troops from Sweden.
- 18 August - The wedding between Crown Prince Adolf Frederick and Louisa Ulrika of Prussia on Drottningholm Palace.
- August - Creation of the L'Ordre de l'Harmonie.
- By royal letter, the right to sell Tobacco in the Swedish cities is reserved for women in need of support, ruined male burghers and war invalids: this is confirmed a second time in 1772, then with the addition that the tobacco sellers are only permitted to employ females or non-adult males.

== Births ==
- 29 January - Catharina Charlotta Swedenmarck, writer (died 1813)
- 9 June – Frans Suell, businessperson (died 1818)
- 15 July – Maria Kristina Kiellström, the role model of Ulla Winblad (died 1798)
- December 15 or 25 - Elsa Fougt, printer, publisher, book importer and newspaper editor (died 1826)
- - Charlotte Du Rietz, love interest of Gustav III (died 1820)
- - Jacob Guntlack, notorious thief (died 1771)

== Deaths ==
- 30 January - Skinnar Per Andersson, rebel leader (born 1703)
- February - Hedvig Taube, royal mistress (born 1714)
- 25 April - Anders Celsius, astronomer, physicist and mathematician (born 1701)
