= 1815 in Sweden =

- Years in Sweden: 1812 1813 1814 1815 1816 1817 1818
- Centuries: 18th century · 19th century · 20th century
- Decades: 1780s 1790s 1800s 1810s 1820s 1830s 1840s
- Years: 1812 1813 1814 1815 1816 1817 1818

Events from the year 1815 in Sweden

== Incumbents ==
- Monarch – Charles XIII

== Events ==
- 23 October - Swedish Pomerania ceded to Prussia.
- - Inauguration of the Fruntimmersföreningens flickskola in Gothenburg, a school founded to educate women to self-supporting professionals and the third to offer serious education to women.
- - Sophie Daguin and André Isidore Carey are recruited to the Royal Swedish Ballet.

== Births ==
- 16 January – Uno Troili, painter (died 1875)
- 10 May – Anders Ljungqvist, fiddler (died 1896)
- 17 June – Thekla Knös, writer (died 1880)
- 18 December – Egron Lundgren, watercolor painter (died 1875)
- - Maria Cederschiöld (deaconess), (died 1892)
- - Emilie Risberg, educator and writer (died 1890)
- - Lotten Wennberg, philanthropist (died 1864)

== Deaths ==
- 28 May – Charlotta Cedercreutz, artist (born 1736)
- 10 August - Birger Martin Hall, botanist (born 1741)
