= 1814 in Sweden =

- Years in Sweden: 1811 1812 1813 1814 1815 1816 1817
- Centuries: 18th century · 19th century · 20th century
- Decades: 1780s 1790s 1800s 1810s 1820s 1830s 1840s
- Years: 1811 1812 1813 1814 1815 1816 1817

Events from the year 1814 in Sweden

== Incumbents ==
- Monarch – Charles XIII

== Events ==
- - Swedish–Norwegian War (1814)
- - Battle of Kjølberg Bridge
- - Convention of Moss
- - H. M. The King's Medal
- - Treaty of Kiel
- - Poem Gefion, skaldedikt i fyra sånger by Eleonora Charlotta d'Albedyhll

== Births ==
- 16 January – Henning Hamilton, politician (died 1886)
- 13 August - Anders Jonas Ångström, physicist (died 1874)
- 22 May – Amalia Lindegren, painter (died 1891)
- 3 September – Mathilda Gelhaar, opera singer (died 1889)
- 1 October – Josefina Deland, women's right activist (died 1891)
- Unknown date – Pilt Carin Ersdotter, famous beauty (died 1885)
- Antoinette Nording, perfume entrepreneur (died 1887)
- Vilhelm Pettersson, ballet dancer (died 1854)
- Lovisa Mathilda Nettelbladt, writer (died 1867)

== Deaths ==
- 26 February – Johan Tobias Sergel, sculptor (born 1740)
- - Georg Johan De Besche, royal favorite (born 1754)
- - Gustaf Mauritz Armfelt, royal favorite (born 1757)
- - Nils Henric Liljensparre, police officer (born 1738)
