= 1748 in Sweden =

- Years in Sweden: 1745 1746 1747 1748 1749 1750 1751
- Centuries: 17th century · 18th century · 19th century
- Decades: 1710s 1720s 1730s 1740s 1750s 1760s 1770s
- Years: 1745 1746 1747 1748 1749 1750 1751

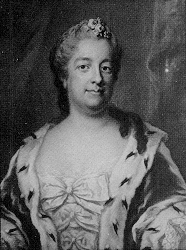
Evadelagardie

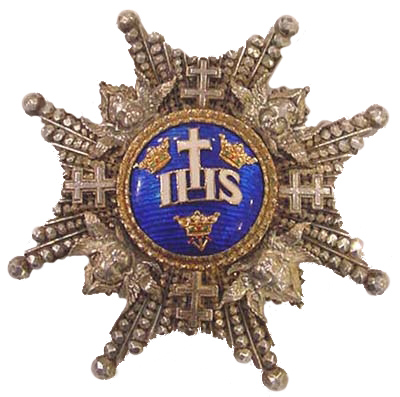

Events from the year 1748 in Sweden

== Incumbents ==
- Monarch – Frederick I

== Events ==
- - The King is no longer able to participate in politics because of health reasons, and a stamp with his signature is manufactured and used by the government of the Riksdag of the Estates.
- - The Royal Order of the Seraphim, Order of the Sword and Order of the Polar Star is created.
- - A new law disbands the privileges of all factories who cannot support themselves with the exception of private home manufacture.
- - The Romani are formally allowed to live in Sweden. The condition is however that they settle permanently and abandon their nomadic life style.
- - Eva Ekeblad is inducted to the Royal Swedish Academy of Sciences. She is the first female member there.
- - A fund and a home is established for the support of widows and orphans of sailors.

== Births ==
- 27 February - Anders Sparrman, naturalist, abolitionist and an apostle of Carl Linnaeus (died 1820)
- 5 March - Jonas Dryander, botanist (died 1810)
- - Louis Masreliez, painter and interior designer (died 1810)
- - Hedvig Wigert, opera singer (died 1780)
- - Charlotte Manderström, courtier (died 1816)
