= 1749 in Sweden =

- Years in Sweden: 1746 1747 1748 1749 1750 1751 1752
- Centuries: 17th century · 18th century · 19th century
- Decades: 1710s 1720s 1730s 1740s 1750s 1760s 1770s
- Years: 1746 1747 1748 1749 1750 1751 1752

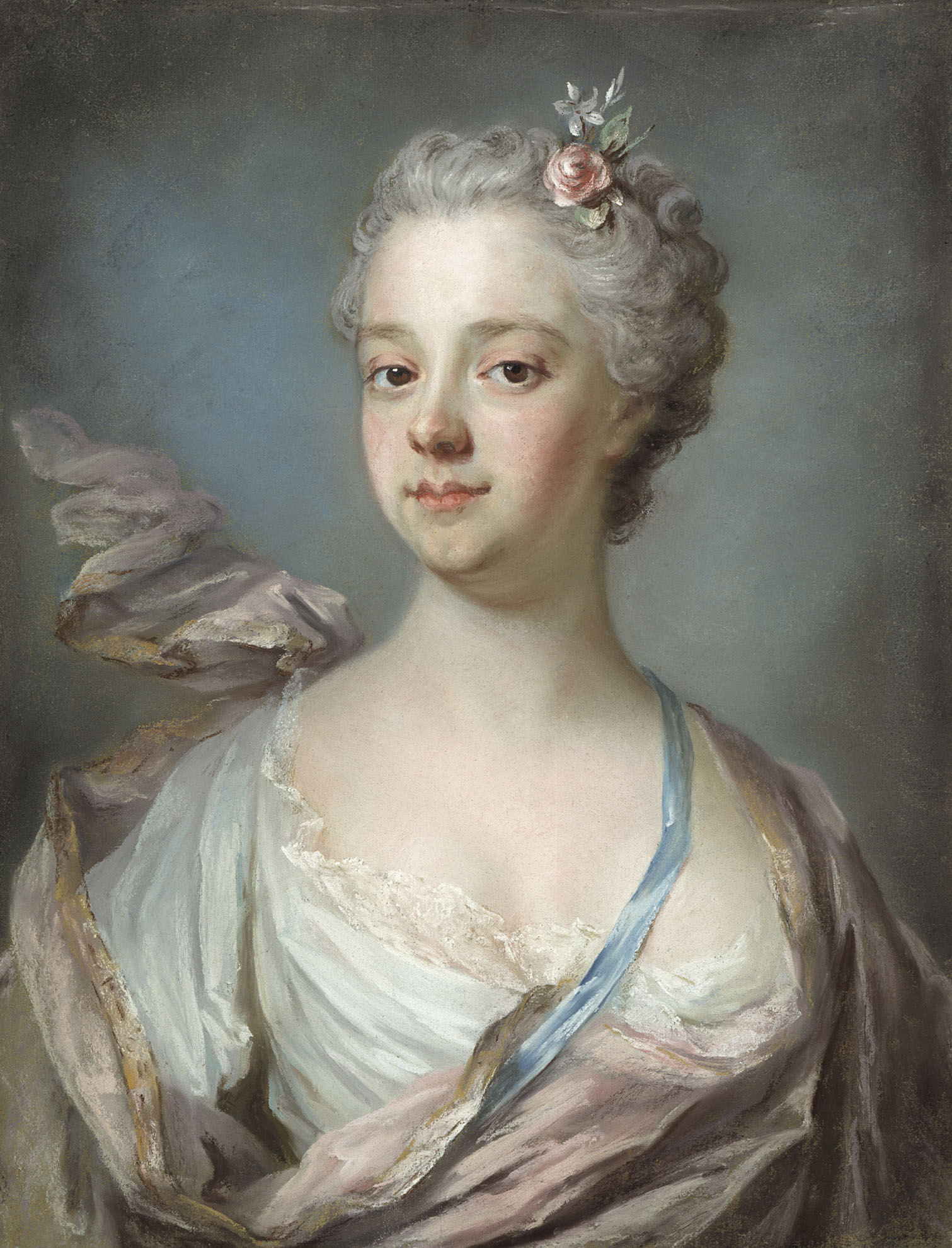
Ulrika Eleonora von Fersen

Events from the year 1749 in Sweden

== Incumbents ==
- Monarch – Frederick I

== Events ==
- - Treaty between Sweden and Denmark.
- - Statistics Sweden
- - Carl Linnaeus conduct his trip to Scania.
- - Street lights are introduced in the capital when every house owner are obliged to place a light of some kind upon their house to light up the street. In practice, however, this instruction is insufficient.
- - The Agricultural revolution, the Great Partition, in which farmers are given united land in individual farms rather than having their land spread in several fields around a village, is initiated in Sweden by Jacob Faggot.
- - A new regulation is issued were the permits of street trade (Månglare), at the time already one of the most common for destitute city women, is henceforth to be given foremost in favor of women in need of supporting themselves.

== Births ==
- 2 January - Carl Gustaf Nordin, historian and ecclesiastic (died 1812)
- 28 April - Adolf Fredrik Munck, royal favorite (died 1831)
- - Sofia Lovisa Gråå, educator (died 1835)
- - Ulla von Höpken, courtier (died 1810)

== Deaths ==
- - Johan August Meijerfeldt, general (born 1665)
- 23 July - Ingeborg i Mjärhult, natural healer, medicine woman, herbalist, natural philosopher, soothsayer and spiritual visionary (born 1665)
