= 1745 in Sweden =

- Years in Sweden: 1742 1743 1744 1745 1746 1747 1748
- Centuries: 17th century · 18th century · 19th century
- Decades: 1710s 1720s 1730s 1740s 1750s 1760s 1770s
- Years: 1742 1743 1744 1745 1746 1747 1748

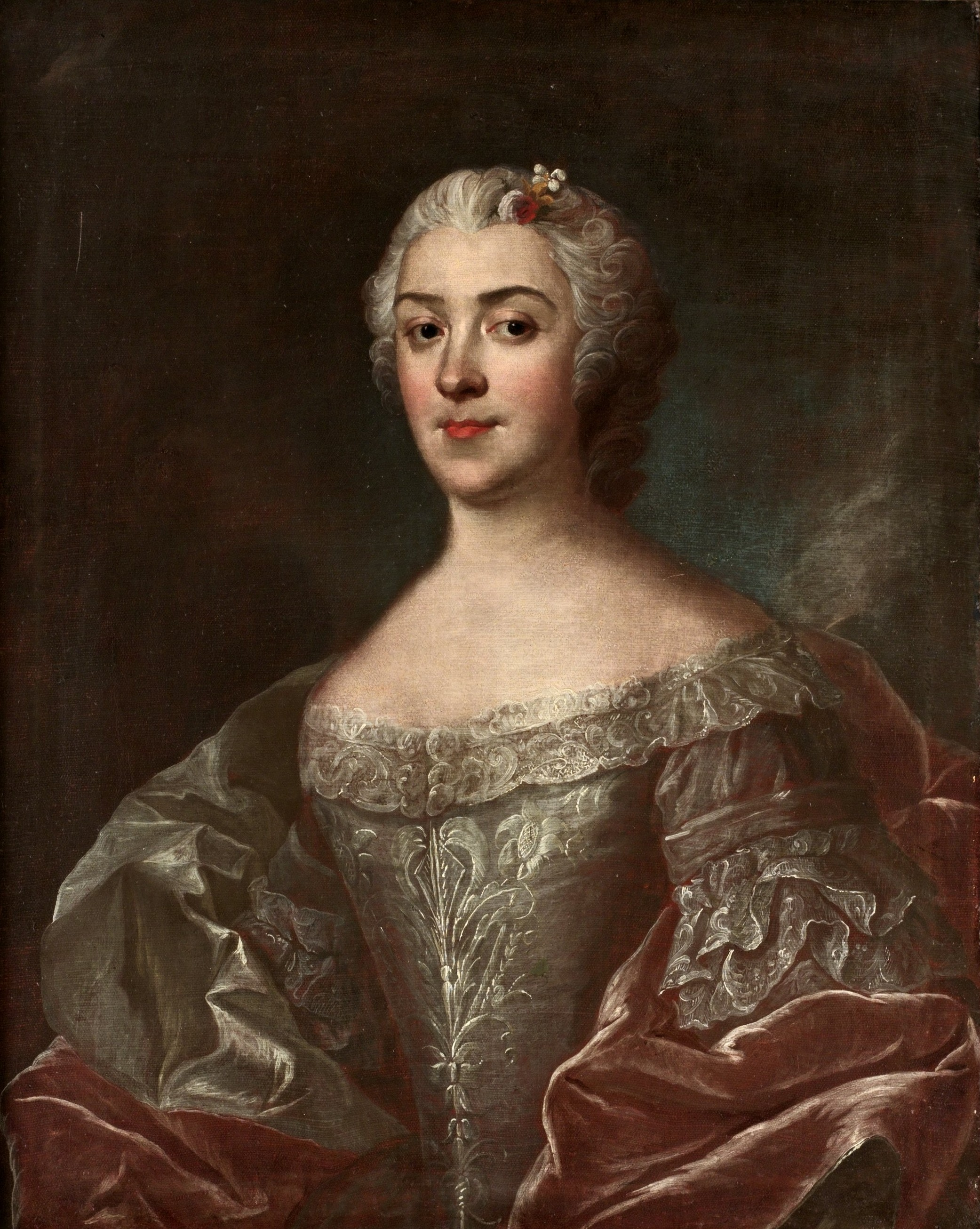

Events from the year 1745 in Sweden

== Incumbents ==
- Monarch – Frederick I

== Events ==
- Catharina Ebba Horn becomes the official royal mistress of the King.
- Hortus Upsaliensis by Carl von Linné
- - Defense treaty between Sweden and Russia.

== Births ==
- February 21 - Olof Tempelman, architect (died 1816)
- March 5 - Christina Elisabeth Carowsky, painter (died 1797)
- May 5 - Carl August Ehrensvärd, naval officer, painter, author, and neo-classical architect (died 1800)
- August 19 - Johan Gottlieb Gahn, chemist and metallurgist who discovered manganese (died 1817)
- September 12 - Lovisa Meijerfeldt, countess and courtier, known as one of the "Three Graces" (died 1818)
- - Brita Horn, courtier (died 1791)

== Deaths ==
- - Hedvig Catharina Lillie, politically active salonniere (born 1695)
- - Sarah Derith, politically active noblewoman (born 1680)
