= 1819 in Sweden =

- Years in Sweden: 1816 1817 1818 1819 1820 1821 1822
- Centuries: 18th century · 19th century · 20th century
- Decades: 1780s 1790s 1800s 1810s 1820s 1830s 1840s
- Years: 1816 1817 1818 1819 1820 1821 1822

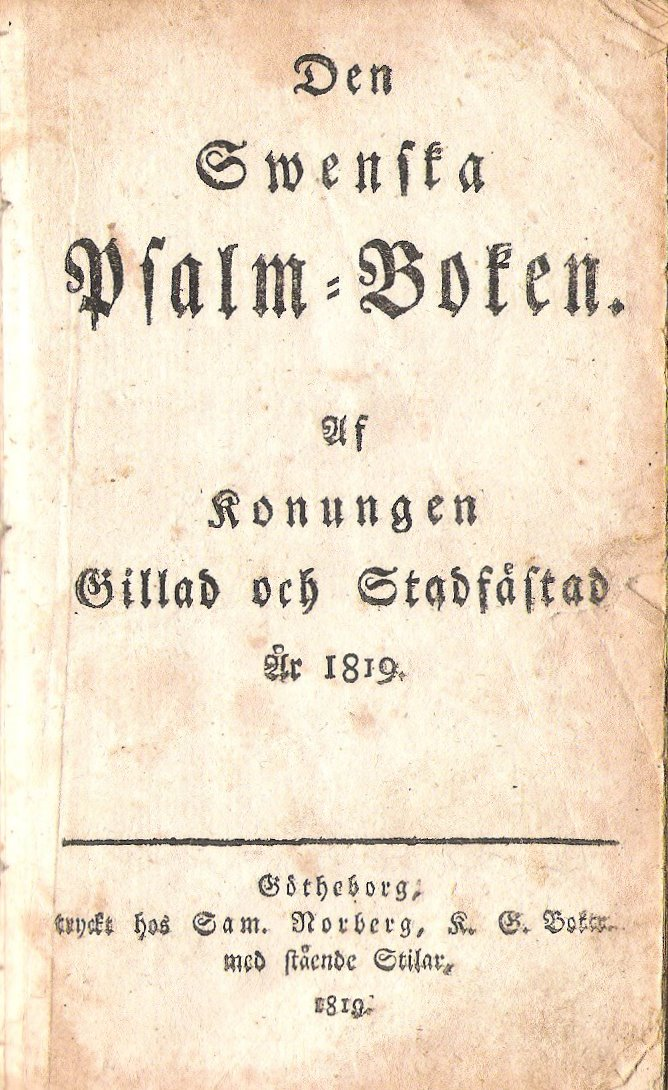

Events from the year 1819 in Sweden

== Incumbents ==
- Monarch – Charles XIV John

== Events ==
- 7 October - Södertälje Canal
- - The charitable society Välgörande fruntimmerssällskapet is founded. It is the first organization in Sweden founded and managed by women.
- - Öland County created.
- - Independent Order of Odd Fellows Sweden
- - Swedish Museum of Natural History

== Births ==
- 19 January - Stor-Stina, Sami (died 1854)
- 21 February – Emilia Uggla, pianist (died 1855)
- 14 March - Erik Edlund, physicist (died 1888)
- 25 March - Theodore Hamberg, missionary and author (died 1854)
- 4 July – Marie Sophie Schwartz, writer (died 1894)
- 12 July – Wilhelmina Fundin, operatic soprano (died 1911)
- Ebba d'Aubert, pianist (died 1860)
- Sophia Isberg, wood cut artist (died 1875)

== Deaths ==
- 8 February – Cecilia Cleve, librarian
- 15 February – Jacob Axelsson Lindblom, arch bishop (born 1746)
- 19 January – Elsa Beata Bunge, botanist (born 1734)
- Helena Quiding, culture personality and builder (born 1755)
