= 1813 in Sweden =

- Decades: 1790s; 1800s; 1810s; 1820s; 1830s
- See also: Other events of 1813; Timeline of Swedish history

Events from the year 1813 in Sweden, including births and deaths.

== Incumbents ==
- Monarch – Charles XIII

== Events ==
- First publication of the newspaper Göteborgs-Posten.
- 7 December - Battle of Bornhöved (1813).
- 13 December - Swedish East India Company is dissolved.
- Unmarried women of legal majority, "Unmarried maiden, who has been declared of legal majority", are given the right to vote in the sockestämma (local parish council, the predecessor of the communal councils), and the kyrkoråd (church councils).
- The Royal Swedish Academy of Agriculture and Forestry is founded.
- The Royal Central Gymnastics Institute is founded.
- The notorious criminal transvestite Lasse-Maja is arrested and becomes famous.

== Births ==
- 8 February - Jacob Georg Agarah, botanist (died 1901) 1813-1901
- 21 May - Oscar Ahnfelt, composer and music publisher (died 1882) 1813-1882
- 19 October - Oscar Gustave Rejlander, photographer (died 1875) 1813-1875
- 1 December - Carl Olofsson - Algutstrop, Sweden (died 1859) 1813-1859

== Deaths ==
- 13 January - Eva Helena Löwen, politically active socialite, spy and royal favorite (born 1743)
- 11 February - Anders Gustav Ekeberg, analytical chemist (born 1767)
- 21 August - Sophia Magdalena of Denmark, queen dowager (born 1746)
- 17 July – Fredrica Löf, actress (born 1760)
- 7 October - Peter Jacob Hjelm, chemist (born 1746)
- 27 December - Gustaf Adolf Reuterholm, royal favorite and de facto regent of Sweden (born 1756)
- Carl Johan Ingman, spy (born 1747)
