= 1818 in Sweden =

- Decades: 1790s; 1800s; 1810s; 1820s; 1830s
- See also: Other events of 1818; Timeline of Swedish history

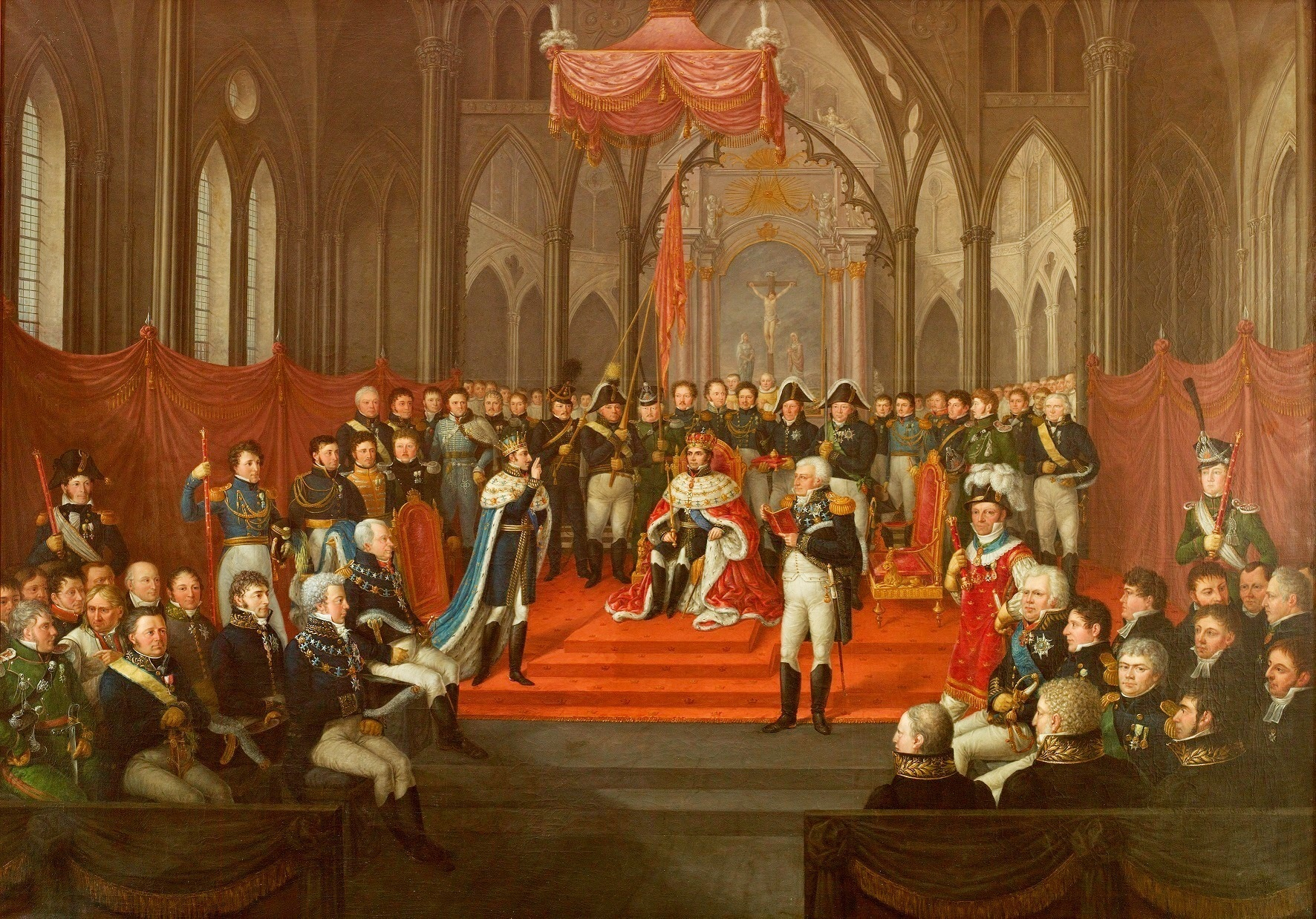
7 September 1818 Coronation of Charles John (formerly general Jean Baptiste Bernadotte) as King Charles III John of Norway.

Events from the year 1818 in Sweden

== Incumbents ==
- Monarch – Charles XIII then Charles XIV John

== Events ==
- 5 February - King Charles XIII of Sweden died and was succeeded by Charles XIV John of Sweden.
- 11 May - The coronation of Charles XIV John of Sweden in Stockholm.
- 7 September - The coronation of Charles XIV John of Sweden as Charles III John of Norway, in Christiana (now Oslo).
- - Gustafva Lindskog are appointed instructor in the first class for physical education and Physical therapy for females in Sweden at the Royal Central Gymnastics Institute (though formally, she was not given this position until 1849).
- - Bodø affair

== Births ==
- 16 January – C. V. A. Strandberg, poet (died 1877)
- 18 May - Gunnar Olof Hyltén-Cavallius, scholar of cultural history, librarian, theatre director, and diplomat (died 1889)
- 27 May – Anton Niklas Sundberg, archbishop of Uppsala (died 1900)
- 18 July – Louis De Geer, politician and writer (died 1896)
- 21 July – Charlotta Öberg, poet (died 1856)
- 22 July – Betty Ehrenborg, writer (died 1880)
- Matilda Kristina von Schwerin, landowner (died 1892)

== Deaths ==
- 10 May – Greta Naterberg, folk singer (b. 1772)
- 20 June - Queen Dowager Charlotte, royalty
- 29 July - Johan Gabriel Oxenstierna, poet (born 1750)
- December 1 - Carl Frederik von Breda, painter (born 1759)
- December 8 - Johan Gottlieb Gahn, chemist and metallurgist who discovered manganese (born 1745)
- 10 March - Fabian von Fersen (1762–1818), officer, politician and courtier (born 1762)
- 19 September - Lovisa Meijerfeldt, countess and courtier, known as one of the "Three Graces" (born 1745)
- 24 September - Sola i Karlstad, innkeeper and local profile (born 1739)
