= 1752 in Sweden =

- Years in Sweden: 1749 1750 1751 1752 1753 1754 1755
- Centuries: 17th century · 18th century · 19th century
- Decades: 1720s 1730s 1740s 1750s 1760s 1770s 1780s
- Years: 1749 1750 1751 1752 1753 1754 1755

Events from the year 1752 in Sweden:

== Incumbents ==
- Monarch – Adolf Frederick

== Events ==
- The Riksdag of the Estates introduce a reform in which the Privy Council Chancellery is henceforth to be elected without the participation of the monarch.
- The spinning schools which had been established through the 1739 reform are given government support, and medals are created for spinning mistresses to encourage the textile industry.
- The first modern hospital, Serafimerlasarettet, is founded.

== Births ==
- 8 September – Carl Stenborg, opera singer (died 1813)
- 12 December – Nils von Rosenstein, civil servant and propagator for enlightenment thinking (died 1824)
  - Barbara Pauli, fashion trader and milliner (approximate year)

== Deaths ==
- 9 February Fredrik Hasselqvist, traveller and naturalist (born 1722)
  - Elisabet Fritz, industrialist
  - Christina Piper, politically active countess, builder and industrialist (born 1673)
