= 1810 in Sweden =

- Decades: 1790s; 1800s; 1810s; 1820s; 1830s
- See also: Other events of 1811; Timeline of Swedish history

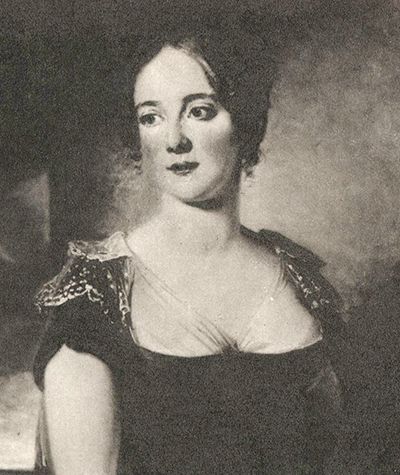
Hedda Wrangel. By Carl Fredric von Breda 1810.

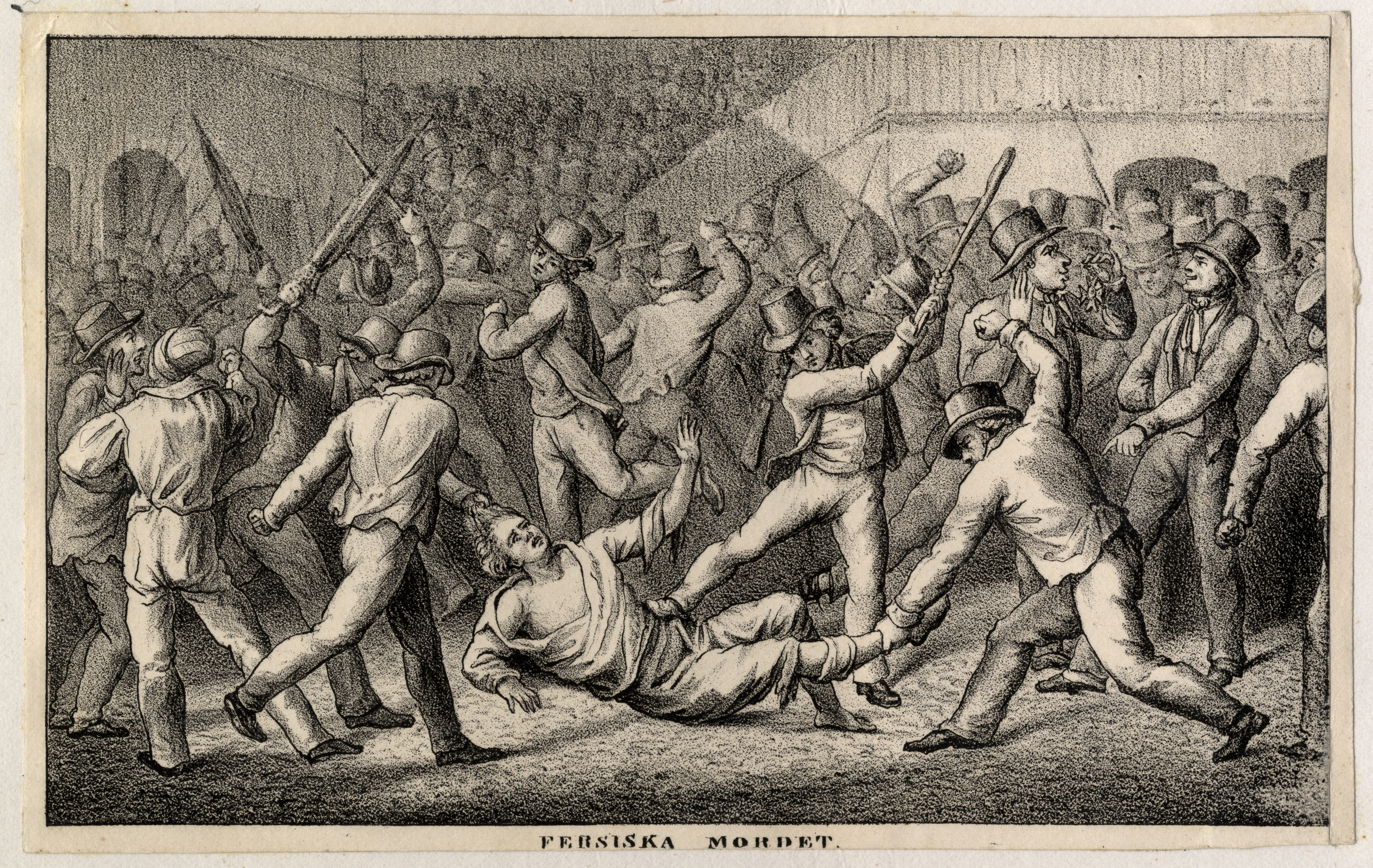
Fersen murder

Events from the year 1810 in Sweden

== Incumbents ==
- Monarch – Charles XIII

== Events ==
- 6 January - Treaty of Paris (1810)
- 7 January - The newly elected heir to the throne, Charles August, arrives in Sweden.
- 28 May - Charles August, Crown Prince of Sweden dies. Rumors suspect poisoning by the Gustavian Party.
- May - Maria Nilsdotter i Ölmeskog dissolves a potential rebel army and are rewarded by the monarch for having prevented a rebellion.
- 20 June - Fersen murder: Axel von Fersen the Younger, a member of the Gustavian Party, is killed by a lynch mob in Stockholm suspected of having murdered Charles August.
- 21 August - Jean Baptiste Bernadotte is elected the new heir to the Swedish throne.
- 20 October - Jean Baptiste Bernadotte arrives in Sweden.
- 2 November - Jean Baptiste Bernadotte makes his formal entry in Stockholm and takes the name Charles John.
- 2 November - The Swedish Act of Succession is passed.
- 5 November - Jean Baptiste Bernadotte is formally adopted by Charles XIII.
- 7 November - Anglo-Swedish War (1810–12)
- 22 December - The spouse and son of Jean Baptiste Bernadotte, Désirée Clary and the future Oscar I, arrives in Sweden.
- The Smådalarö Gård is completed.
- Johan Olof Wallin inducted to the Swedish Academy.
- The right of an unmarried woman to be declared of legal majority by royal dispensation are officially confirmed by parliament.
- The execution of Metta Fock.

== Births ==
- 20 May – Sara Augusta Malmborg, singer, pianist and painter (died 1860) 1810 - 1860
- 7 June - Carl August Adlersparre, chamberlain (1838), poet, novelist and historian (died 1862) 1810 - 1862
- 16 October – Carl Wahlbom, artist (died 1858) 1810 - 1858

== Deaths ==
- 19 March – Louis Masreliez, artist (born 1748)
- 28 May - Charles August, Crown Prince of Sweden, crown prince (born 1768)
- 20 June - Axel von Fersen the Younger, courtier, military, diplomat (born 1755)
- 17 September - Ulla von Höpken, courtier profile of the Gustavian Age (born 1749)
- - Hedvig Amalia Charlotta Klinckowström, artist (born 1777)
