= 1809 in Sweden =

- Years in Sweden: 1806 1807 1808 1809 1810 1811 1812
- Centuries: 18th century · 19th century · 20th century
- Decades: 1770s 1780s 1790s 1800s 1810s 1820s 1830s
- Years: 1806 1807 1808 1809 1810 1811 1812

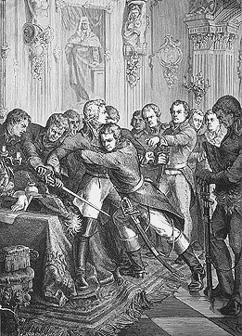
Gustav IV 's arrest

Events from the year 1809 in Sweden

== Incumbents ==
- Monarch – Gustav IV Adolf then Charles XIII

== Events ==
- 29 March - Coup of 1809: Gustav IV Adolf of Sweden is deposed in a coup d'état and his uncle is made Regent.
- May - The Committee on the Constitution (Parliament of Sweden) is established.
- 10 May - The former King's son is also deprived of his right to the throne.
- 5 June - The former king's uncle Charles XIII of Sweden is placed upon the throne after having accepted a new constitution.
- 6 June - Instrument of Government (1809).
- 18 July - Charles August is elected new heir to the throne of Sweden.
- 19-20 August - Battle of Ratan and Sävar
- 17 September - Treaty of Fredrikshamn
- Inauguration of the Malmö Teater in Malmö.
- December - The former monarch and his family leaves Sweden for Germany.
- Allmänna institutet för Blinda och Döfstumma (Public Institute of the Blind and Deaf), the first school for deaf and mute students, is inaugurated in Stockholm by Pär Aron Borg with a demonstration by Charlotta Seuerling.

== Births ==
- 6 January – Sven Lovén, marine zoologist and malacologist (died 1895)
- 21 August – Hanna Brooman, composer, translator and educator (died 1887)
- 7 September - Wilhelmina Gravallius, writer (died 1884)
- - Angelique Magito, actress (died 1895)

== Deaths ==
- 1 May – Maria Elisabet de Broen, translator and theatre manager (born 1756)
- 25 July - Charlotta Roos, medium (born 1771)
- Jeanna von Lantingshausen, politically active socialite (born 1753)
- Hedvig Sofia von Rosen, royal governess (born 1734)
