= 1831 in Sweden =

== Incumbents ==
- Monarch – Charles XIV John

== Events ==
- 22 August - The premier of Nornan by Julia Nyberg at the Royal Swedish Opera i Stockholm.
- - Inauguration of Wallinska skolan in Stockholm.
- - Lunds Studentsångförening is created
- - First issue of Vestmanlands Läns Tidning
- Sweden begins tracking conviction statistics.
- Private banks are allowed to issue their own banknotes.
- The Visingo oak forest was started, leading to the planting of 300,000 oak trees intended to build naval ships.

== Births ==
- 16 March – Elise Hwasser, actress (died 1894)
- 28 August - Ludvig Norman, composer, conductor, pianist, and music teacher (died 1885)
- 14 November - Betty Deland, actress (died 1882)
- 22 October – Frithiof Holmgren, Swedish physiologist (d. 1897)

== Deaths ==
- 18 July – Adolf Fredrik Munck, royal favorite (born 1749)
- Charlotta Richardy, industrialist (born 1751)
