= 1892 in Sweden =

- Decades: 1870s; 1880s; 1890s; 1900s; 1910s
- See also: Other events of 1892; Timeline of Swedish history

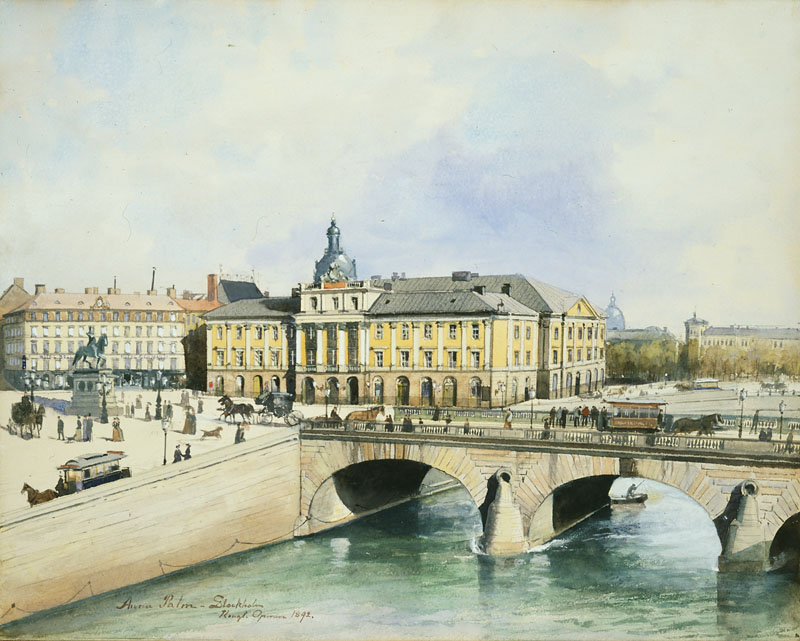
Gustavianska operan c. 1892

Events from the year 1892 in Sweden

== Incumbents ==
- Monarch – Oscar II
- Prime Minister – Erik Gustaf Boström.

== Events ==
- Cision
- Örebro Mission
- Swedish Cooperage Union
- 11 June - Stockholm Public Women's Club is founded in Stockholm.

== Births ==
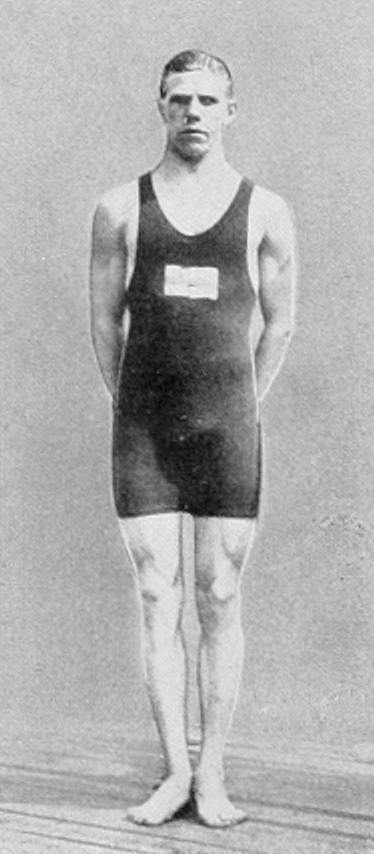
Erik Adlerz won two Olympic gold medals in diving in 1912.

- 2 July – Anders Larsson, sport wrestler (died 1945).
- 10 July – Augusta Björkenstam, countess and businessperson (died 1892)
- 23 July – Erik Adlerz, diver (died 1975).
- 15 August – Gösta Lundqvist, sailor (died 1944).
- 4 December – Per Bertilsson, gymnast (died 1972).

== Deaths ==
- 7 January - Maria Cederschiöld (deaconess) (born 1815)
- Carolina Lindström, hat maker (born 1812)
- 11 December - Nancy Edberg, pioneer swimmer (born 1832)
- 25 January - Charlotta Norberg, ballerina (born 1824)
- 21 October - Anne Charlotte Leffler, writer (born 1849)
- Matilda Kristina von Schwerin, landowner (born 1818)
