= 1751 in Sweden =

- Years in Sweden: 1748 1749 1750 1751 1752 1753 1754
- Centuries: 17th century · 18th century · 19th century
- Decades: 1720s 1730s 1740s 1750s 1760s 1770s 1780s
- Years: 1748 1749 1750 1751 1752 1753 1754

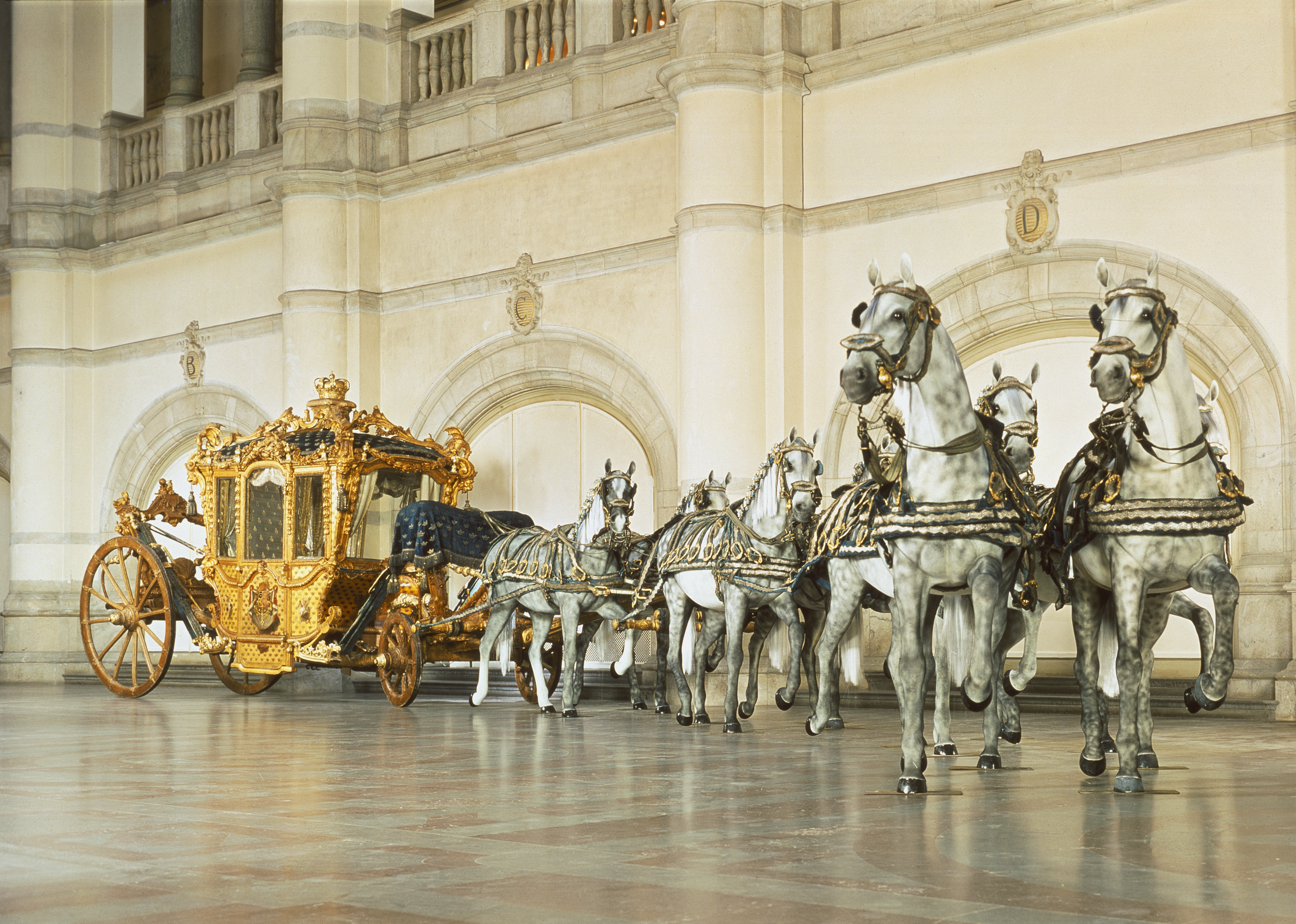

Events from the year 1751 in Sweden

== Incumbents ==
- Monarch – Frederick I then Adolf Frederick

== Events ==
- January - Crown Prince Gustav is engaged to Sophia Magdalena of Denmark.
- 25 March - Frederick I of Sweden are succeeded by Adolf Frederick, King of Sweden.
- 8 June - A great fire in Stockholm.
- 21 September – The final border between Sweden and Norway is recognized.
- 25 November – Coronation of Adolf Frederick, King of Sweden, and Queen Louisa Ulrika.
- The Lapp Codicil of 1751 defines the border between Sweden and Norway and secures the right of the Sami to continue their nomadic lifestyle between the borders.
- Axel Fredrik Cronstedt discovers nickel.
- Hönsgummans visa by Olaus Petri Carelius

== Births ==
- 18 February – Adolf Ulrik Wertmüller, painter (died 1811)
- 24 December - Lars von Engeström, diplomat (died 1826)
- 1 December – Johan Henric Kellgren, poet (died 1795)
- - Anna Rogel, charismatic preacher (died 1784)
- Charlotta Richardy, industrialist (died 1831)

== Deaths ==
- 25 March - Frederick I of Sweden, monarch (born 1676)
- 3 August - Christopher Polhem, scientist, inventor and industrialist (born 1661)
- 8 March - Hedvig Elisabet Strömfelt, courtier (born 1687)
