= 1798 in Sweden =

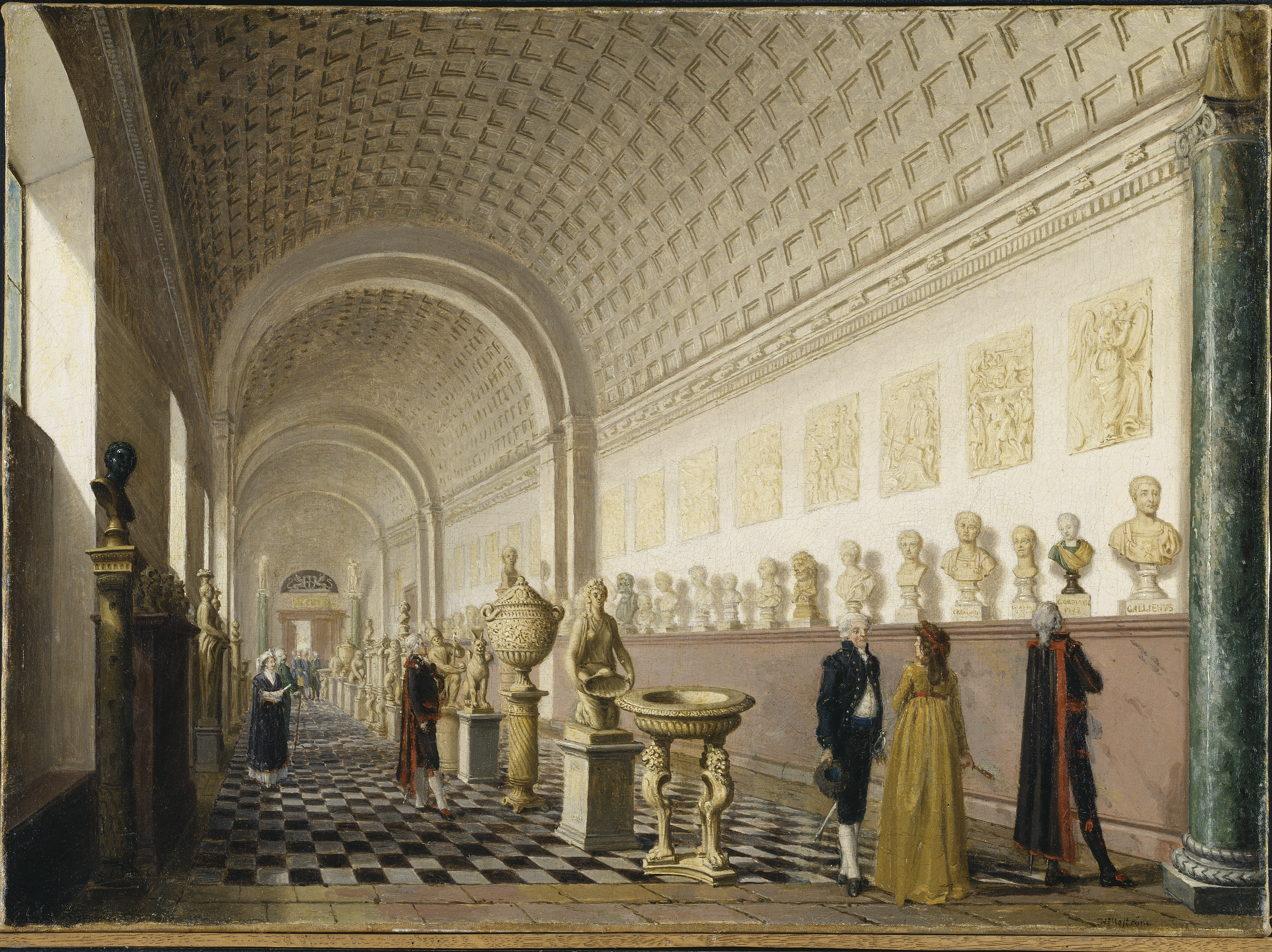
Hilleströminre

Events from the year 1798 in Sweden

== Incumbents ==
- Monarch – Gustav IV Adolf

== Events ==
- - The Royal Dramatic Theatre is granted monopoly of professional dramatic performances within the city borders of Stockholm, and all other theaters in Stockholm, notably the Stenborg Theatre, is closed down (the monopoly is not dissolved until 1842).
- - Married business women are given legal majority and juridical responsibility within the affairs of their business enterprise, despite being otherwise under guardianship of their spouse.

== Births ==
- 9 March – Mathilda Berwald, concert singer (died 1877)
- 16 June – Johan Henrik Thomander
- Lovisa Charlotta Borgman, violinist (died 1884)
- Gustafva Röhl, educator (died 1848)

== Deaths ==
- 20 January - Maria Kristina Kiellström, role model of Ulla Winblad (born 1744)
- Ulrika Fredrika Bremer, shipowner (born 1746)
- Anna Maria Hjärne, courtier (born 1718)
