= 1894 in Sweden =

- Decades: 1870s; 1880s; 1890s; 1900s; 1910s
- See also: Other events of 1894; Timeline of Swedish history

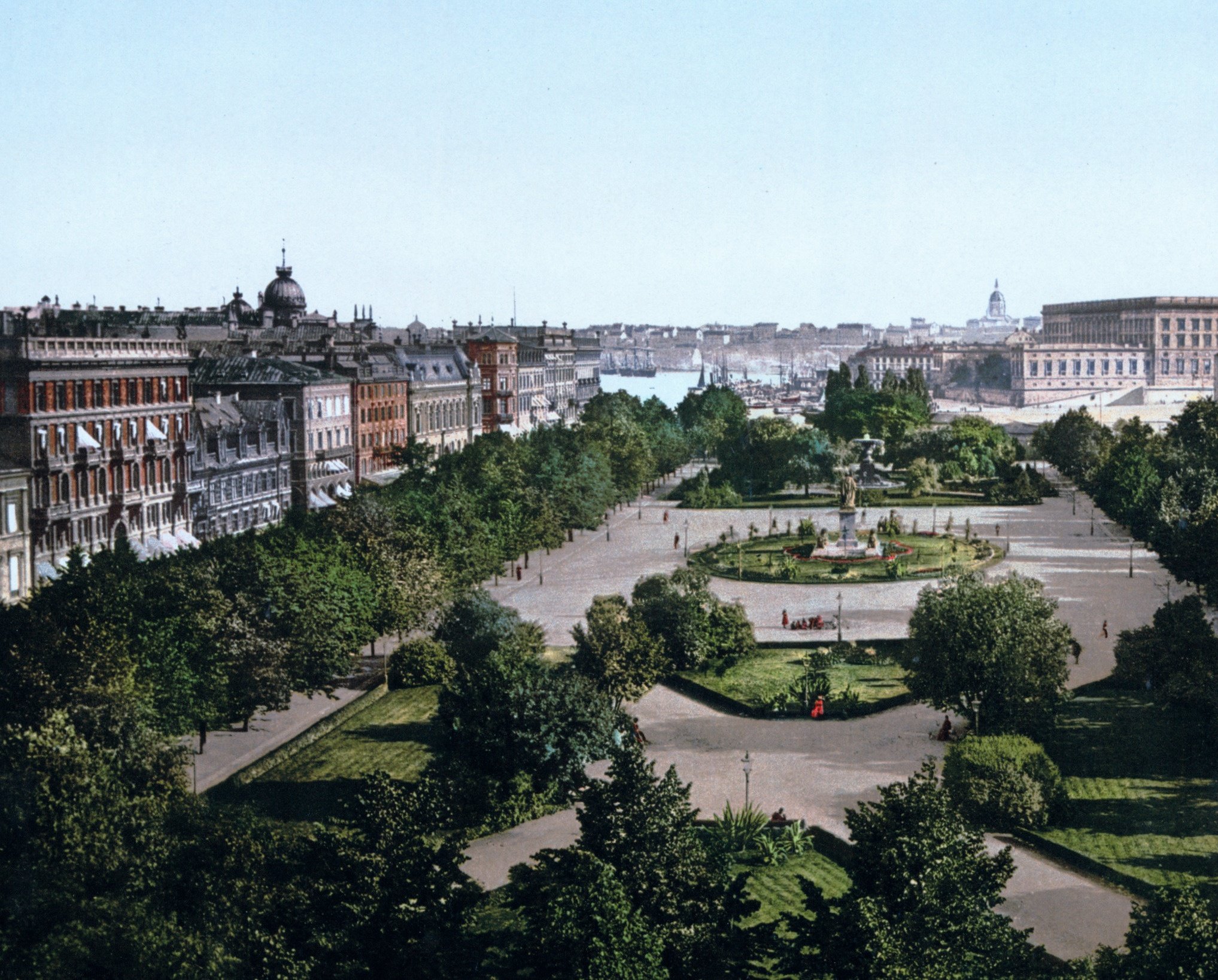
Stockholm Kungsträdgårdsgatan (1890–1900)

Events from the year 1894 in Sweden

== Incumbents ==
- Monarch – Oscar II
- Prime Minister – Erik Gustaf Boström.

== Events ==
- 11 March – GAIS is founded.
- 1 April – Nacka Station is opened.
- 3 December: The Church of Sweden Umeå City Church is inaugurated on First Advent Sunday.
- Kata Dalström is engaged as a lecturer for the Verdandi, a Swedish social-political organization.
- Svartviks IF, a Swedish football club is established.
- The Women's Association for Swedish Maritime Defence was formed.

== Births ==
- 1 January - Aurora Nilsson, writer (died 1972).
- 21 March – Hannah Ryggen, textile artist (died 1970).
- 25 March – Erik William Gustav Leidzen, Swedish composer. (died 1962)
- 6 July – Edmund Lindmark, gymnast (died 1968).
- 17 August - Erik Blomberg, Swedish author. (died 1965)
- 15 September - Oskar Klein, Swedish physicist. (died 1977)
- 9 October - Agnes von Krusenstjerna, writer (died 1940).

== Deaths ==
- 28 January – Elise Hwasser, actress (born 1831)
- 27 April – Peggy Hård, first woman clerk (born 1825)
- 7 May – Marie Sophie Schwartz, writer (born 1819)
- 22 October – Gillis Bildt, politician (born 1820)
- 28 December – Gumman Strömberg, fish seller, local profile (born 1830)
