= 1743 in Sweden =

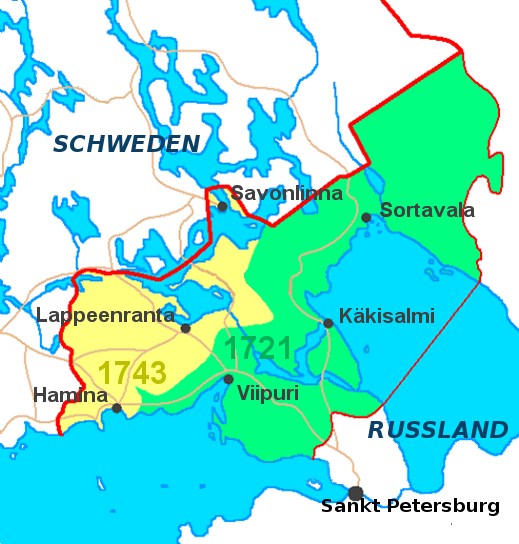
Old Finland. The area in yellow was given to the Russian empire .

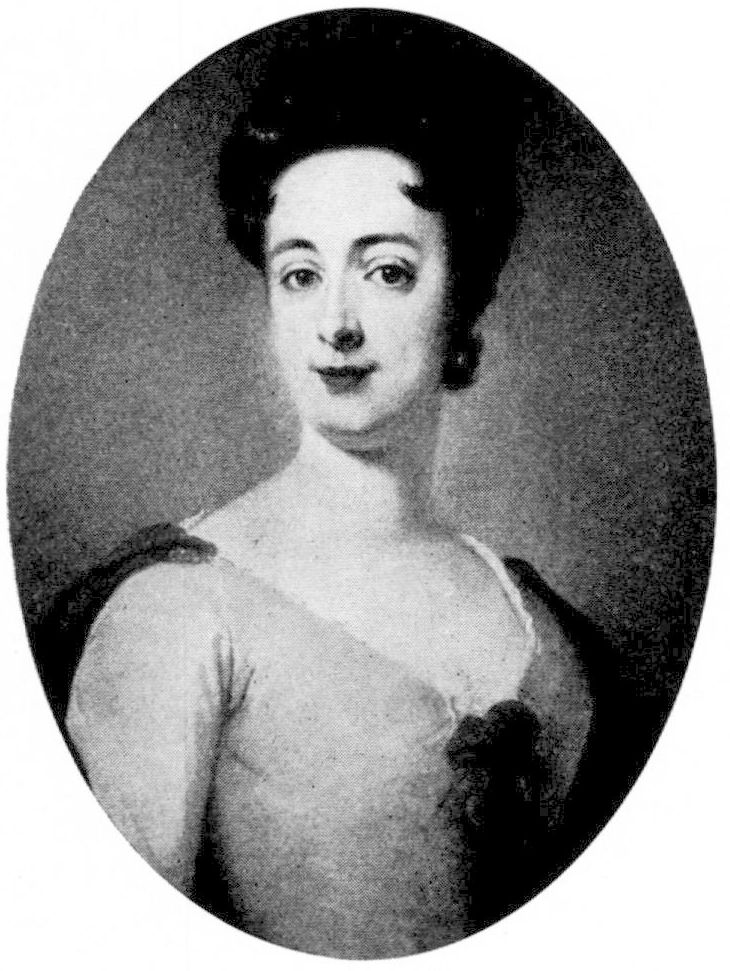
Emerentia von Düben

Events from the year 1743 in Sweden

== Incumbents ==
- Monarch – Frederick I

== Events ==
- March - The peasant estate in the Riksdag of the Estates support Crown Prince Frederick of Denmark before Adolf Frederik of Holstein-Gottorp, as candidate to the post of heir to the Swedish throne.
- May - Three of the four estates in the Riksdag of the Estates: the nobility, the clergy and the burghers, offers to support the Russian candidate as heir to the Swedish throne in exchange for favorable peace terms with Russia.
- 11 June - Dalecarlian Rebellion (1743). A rebel army of peasants march toward Stockholm to prevent the election of Adolf Frederik of Holstein-Gottorp as heir to the Swedish throne and punish those responsible for the war.
- 16 June - Preliminary peace between Sweden and Russia.
- 22 June - The rebel army reach Stockholm, where they are dispersed by the military.
- 23 June - Adolf Frederik of Holstein-Gottorp, the candidate of Empress Elizabeth I of Russia, is elected heir to the Swedish throne.
- July - Execution of Henrik Magnus von Buddenbrock.
- 7 August - Treaty of Åbo.
- September – Denmark-Norway threatens to declare war because their candidate, Crown Prince Frederick of Denmark, was not chosen as heir to the Swedish throne, which result in Sweden having to accept a Russian protective force in Sweden.
- - Den sörgande Turtur-dufvan by Hedvig Charlotta Nordenflycht.
- - Elisabeth Christina von Linné publishes her discovery of the Tropaeolum majus.

== Births ==
- 1 February - Johan Christopher Toll, soldier (died 1817)
- April 17 - Johan Törnström, sculptor (died 1828)
- 11 November - Carl Peter Thunberg, naturalist and an apostle of Carl Linnaeus (died 1828)
- 15 December - Eva Helena Löwen, socialite, agent and royal favorite (died 1813)

== Deaths ==
- July - Execution of Henrik Magnus von Buddenbrock, Lieutenant General (born 1685)
- 22 march - Emerentia von Düben, royal favorite (born 1669)
- 23 September - Erik Benzelius the younger, theologian (born 1675)
- 20 October - Michael Dahl, painter (born 1659)
