= 1895 in Sweden =

- Decades: 1870s; 1880s; 1890s; 1900s; 1910s
- See also: Other events of 1895; Timeline of Swedish history

This article lists the events from the year 1895 in Sweden

== Incumbents ==
- Monarch – Oscar II
- Prime Minister – Erik Gustaf Boström.

== Events ==
- ÅF
- Bollnäs GIF
- Cederroth
- Idrottsföreningen Kamraterna
- IFK Askersund
- IFK Stockholm
- Stockholms KK
- IFK Sundsvall
- Swedish Sailing Federation
- IFK Uppsala Fotboll

== Births ==
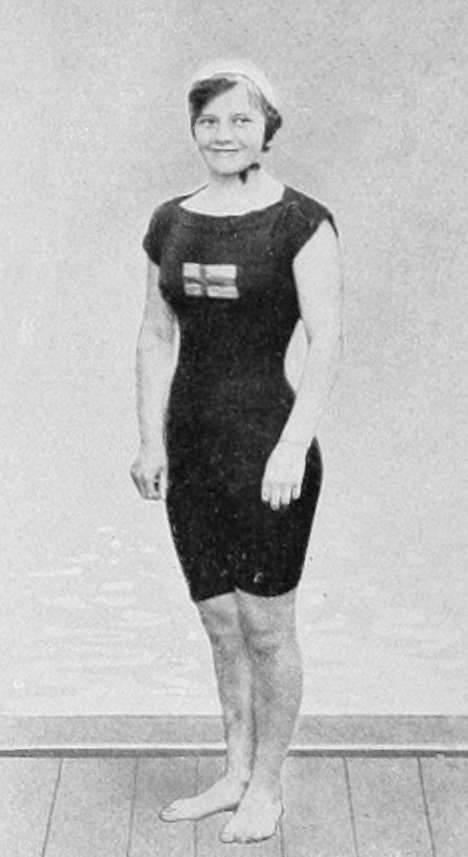
Greta Johansson.

- 2 January – Folke Bernadotte, diplomat (died 1948)
- 9 January – Greta Johansson, diver (died 1978).
- 17 June – Ruben Rausing, entrepreneur, founder of Tetra Pak (died 1983).
- 12 September – Yngve Holm, sailor (died 1943).
- 18 December – Ture Hedman, gymnast (died 1950).

== Deaths ==
- 30 January - Hilda Petrini, watchmaker (born 1838)
- 25 March - Bertha Valerius, photographer (born 1824)
- 6 June - Gustaf Nordenskiöld, explorer (born 1868)
- 31 December – Augusta Dorothea Eklund, street peddler and eccentric (born 1826)
- Angelique Magito, actress (born 1809)
