= 1741 in Sweden =

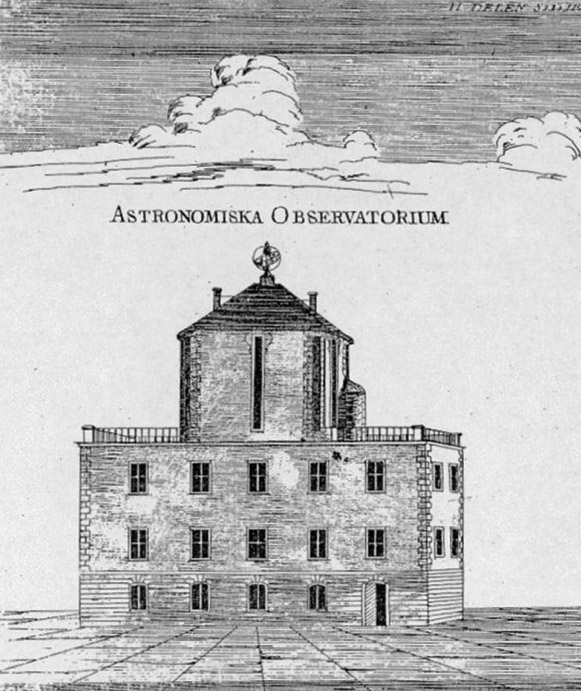
The house of Anders Celsius with his observatory on the roof, detail from an engraving

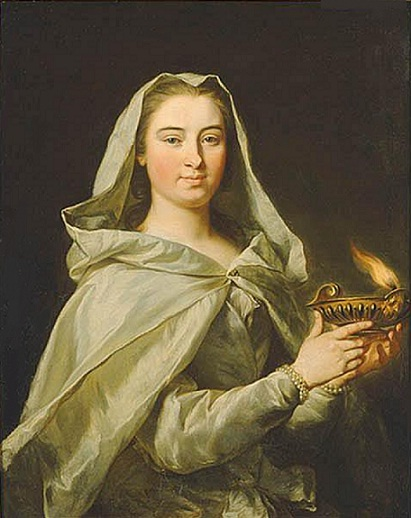
Charlotta Sparre as vestal

Events from the year 1741 in Sweden

== Incumbents ==
- Monarch – Frederick I

== Events ==
- 31 March - The Royal Swedish Academy of Sciences is given its rules.
- 15 May - Carl Linnaeus travel to Öland.
- 28 July - Russo-Swedish War (1741–43)
- 23 August - Battle of Villmanstrand
- The punishment of Uppenbar kyrkoplikt (Public Church Duty), a form of public humiliation were criminals are pilloried by being placed on a stool during sermon and repent their criminal act, are abolished for sexual crimes, such as having sex outside marriage, in order to spare unmarried mothers the social stigma which are viewed as a contributing factor of infanticide. The reason is to spare unmarried mothers the social stigma which results in infanticide, as the Uppenbar kyrkoplikt in practice exposed them and makes their indiscretion impossible to hide.
- The guild membership requirement for innkeepers are dropped. This makes the profession considerably more accessible for women and makes it one of the most common for women.
- Carl Linnaeus is ennobled.
- Uppsala Astronomical Observatory is inaugurated.
- Et ankommit bref om såningsmachinen under namn af Lotta Triven by Charlotta Frölich (who thereby becomes the first woman to be published by the Royal Swedish Academy of Sciences).

== Births ==
- 20 January - Carl Linnaeus the Younger, naturalist (died 1783)
- 10 August - Georg Haupt, cabinet maker (died 1784)
- 26 August - Birger Martin Hall, botanist (died 1815)
- - Anna Brita Wendelius, singer (died 1804)

== Deaths ==
- 16 September - Sofia Drake, landowner and letter writer (born 1662)
- 24 November - Ulrika Eleonora, Queen of Sweden, queen, ex-monarch (born 1688)
- 4 October - Märta Ljungberg, innkeeper, local profile (born 1656)
