= Sara Augusta Malmborg =

Swedish pianist (1810–1860)

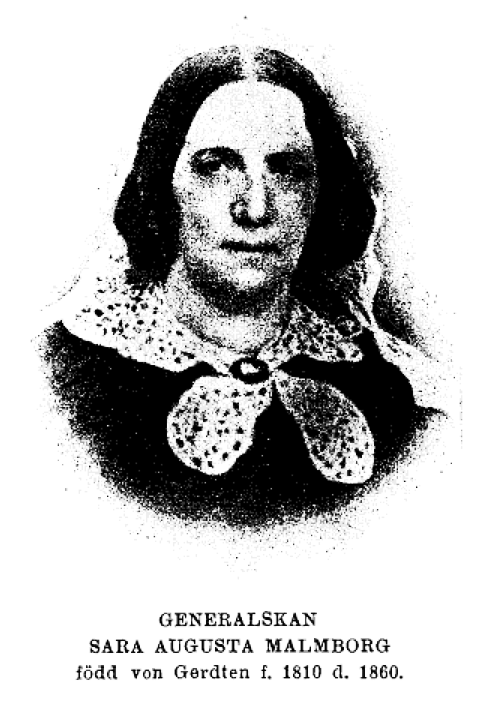
Sara Augusta Malmborg

Sara Augusta Malmborg, née von Gertten (20 May 1810 - 10 August 1860, Våxnäs) was a Swedish singer, pianist and painter.

Malmborg was born, Björsbyholm in Sunne in Värmland, the daughter of colonel lieutenant nobleman Emil Adam von Gerdten (1772-1844) and Charlotta Ulrika Catarina Löwenhielm (1786-1875) and niece of governor Carl Gustaf Löwenhielm. In 1830, she married general Otto August Malmborg.

She was described:

"The wife of General Malmborg, née von Gerdten, was richly talented by in mind as well as the heart and although she had a great household to manage, was still the center figure of the musical life of Karlstad, which was notable in those days. She herself often appeared at concerts and soiree's and was much celebrated for her accomplished piano play, particularly for her interpretation of Beethowen. She was additionally a talented painter and her specialty was to paint in sepia."

Malmborg was inducted as nr 372 of the Royal Swedish Academy of Music on 30 November 1858.
