= Skinnar Per Andersson =

Swedish politician (1703–1744)

Skinnar Per Andersson from Sollerön (1703 – 30 January 1744) was a farmer from Dalarna, member of the Swedish Riksdag representing parts of Dalarna and one of the key leaders of the Dalecarlian Rebellion of 1743.

Andersson had appeared at a landsting in 1742 (gathered on the request of the commoners of Dalarna), where he emerged as the most prominent opponent of the government and the Estates. He was elected to the Riksdag by the delegation from Dalarna. Notably, his mandate was conditioned by a written contract which stipulated that his pay as Riksdag delegate would depend on what kind of improvements he would bring to the peasantry. Andersson's constituency covered the bailiwicks of Upper Siljan, Lower Siljan and Western Dalarna, as well as Gagnef and Svärdsjö.

In regards to the issue of the royal succession, Andersson supported the claim to the throne of the Danish crown prince Fredrik.

In the Riksdag Andersson participated in the commission that had been assigned to audit the war efforts. He returned to Dalarna, where he participated in a meeting of parish delegates in Leksand on 12 March 1743, during which he called on the people of Dalarna to resist recruitment to the army. Andersson had brought a morning star to the meeting, and whilst the county governor was speaking in favour of releasing recruits to the army the weapon was slammed into the ceiling of the meeting hall.

Andersson travelled back to Stockholm, whereby he moderated his stance on the recruitment issue. However, he was unable to convince his constituents. Back in Dalarna (where an armed rebellion was being organized), he argued at a meeting in Lisseby for postponement of the march on Stockholm for two weeks. Once the march towards Stockholm began, he joined it.

Skinnar Per Andersson was sentenced to death by the Svea Hovrätt court of appeals on 9 January 1744. He was executed on 30 January 1744, along with a number of other leaders of the rebellion.
