= Lovisa Charlotta Borgman =

Swedish musician (1798–1884)

Lovisa Charlotta Borgman, later Biörck (1798, in Gothenburg – 1884), was a Swedish violinist. She was a member of the Royal Swedish Academy of Music from 1853 (seat 388).

Borgman and her elder sister was a student of Johan Fredrik Berwald. During the 1820s, she performed successfully with her sister (also a violinist) in concerts at tours in Gothenburg, Stockholm, Norway, Finland and in Saint Petersburg and Moscow in Russia.

She ended her career after her marriage to the then mayor of Stockholm, Johan Anders Biörck.
