= IFK Askersund =

Swedish sports club

- Full name: Idrottsföreningen kamraterna Askersund
- Sport: soccer bandy (earlier)
- Founded: 1 February 1895
- Based in: Askersund, Sweden
- Ballpark: Solberga IP

IFK Askersund is a sports club in Askersund, Sweden, established 1 February 1895. running soccer activity. The club has also scored bandy successes, playing nine seasons in the Swedish top division between 1945 and 1964/1965.
