= Vestmanlands Läns Tidning =

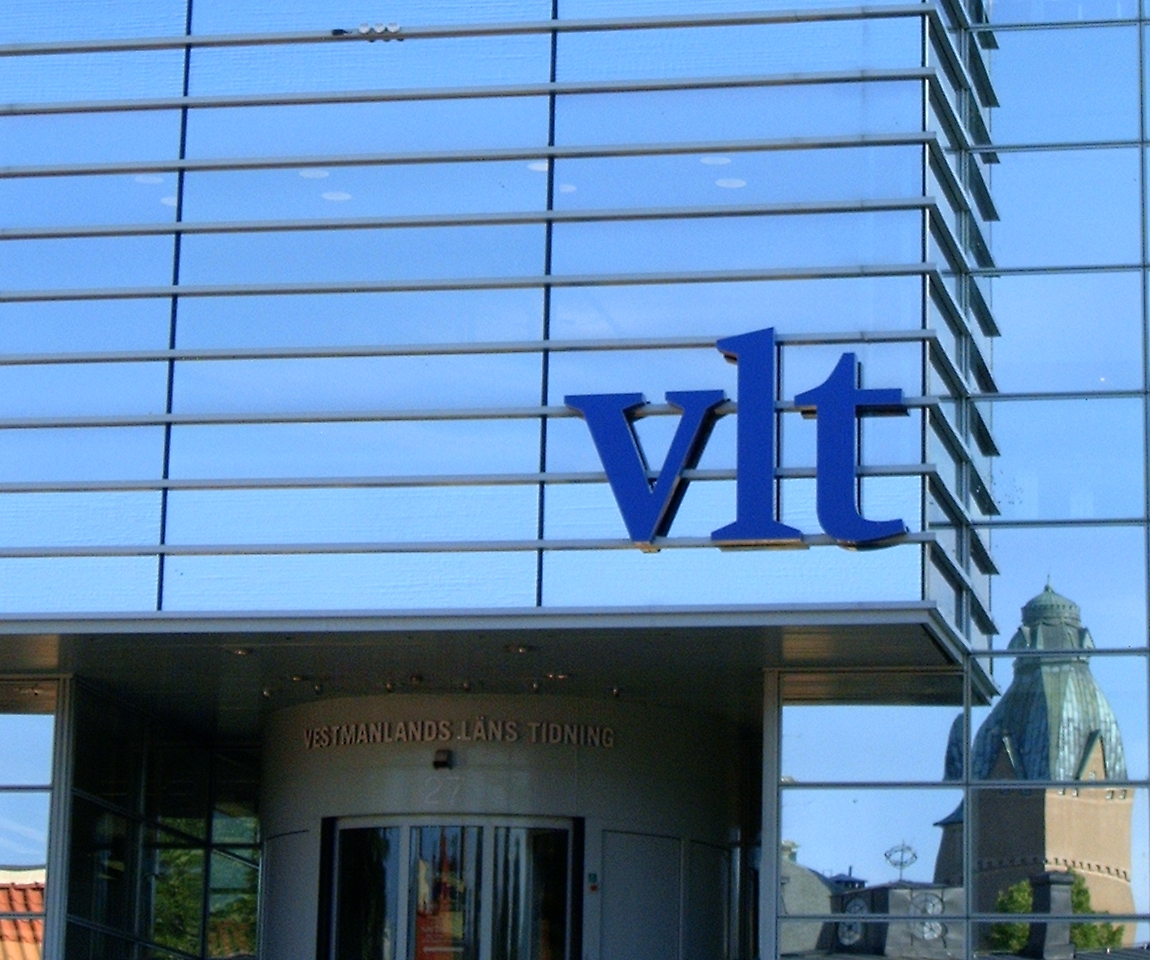
- VLT headquarters in Västerås
- Editor-in-chief: Göran Lundberg
- Founded: 1831; 195 years ago
- Political alignment: Independent liberal
- Language: Swedish
- Headquarters: Västerås, Sweden
- Circulation: 33,600 (2013)
- ISSN: 1104-0181
- Website: vlt.se

Vestmanlands Läns Tidning (VLT) is a Swedish liberal newspaper published in Västerås, Sweden.

== History and profile ==
VLT was established in 1831. The paper was published in broadsheet format until 13 October 2004 when it was changed to tabloid.

The circulation of VLT was 37,900 copies in 2010. It was 36,000 copies in 2012 and 33,600 copies in 2013.
