= Independent Order of Odd Fellows in Sweden =

Seal of the Grand Lodge of Sweden of the Independent Order of Odd Fellows.

The Independent Order of Odd Fellows in Sweden (IOOF), is a part as a grand lodge of the non-political and non-sectarian Independent Order of Odd Fellows, made up of people of good character who have a desire to promote universal harmony and are ready to exercise works of charity and benevolence, specially to those in need.

== History in Sweden ==
The Independent Order of Odd Fellows came to Sweden when two businessmen who were members of the Odd Fellows in Copenhagen, Denmark, took the initiative to open a lodge. The Scania Lodge No. 1 was instituted in Malmö on October 29, 1884. The second lodge, Veritas Lodge No. 2, was then established in Trelleborg, also in Skåne. At that time, both lodges were still under the jurisdiction of the IOOF Grand Lodge of Denmark. On August 1, 1888, Amicitia Lodge no. 3 was instituted in Malmö under the jurisdiction of the Sovereign Grand Lodge in the United States. From this lodge, other lodges were also established such as John Ericsson Lodge no. 4 in Stockholm on July 20, 1892, Concordia Lodge no.5 in Eslöv on November 4, 1893, and Linnea Lodge no. 8 in Ystad on November 18, 1894. Holmia Lodge no. 6 Holmia in Stockholm was formed in March 1894 and Westmania Lodge no.7 in Västerås on October 27, 1894. On July 8, 1895, the Grand Lodge for the Kingdom of Sweden was instituted on July 8, 1895. The first "Storsire" installed was Wilhelm Laurentz, a member of Lodge No. 4 John Ericsson.

Today, the Swedish Odd Fellow Order occupy a leading position in terms of membership with over 40,000 members and about 272 lodges. The encampment branch is also very strong in Sweden with 23 odd fellow and 13 Rebekah encampments totaling 40,000 members. There are no mixed lodges and patriarchs militant do not exist. There is also a great number of clubs and associations within the framework of the IOOF of Sweden with all kinds of objects from socialisation to providing poor children with summer homes. Moreover, Odd Fellows of Sweden was entrusted to reintroduce Odd Fellowship in Poland and two Odd Fellows lodges and 1 Rebekah lodge were quickly established. The Rebekah movement is fast growing in members.

== See also ==
- Independent Order of Odd Fellows
- Odd Fellows
