= Egron Lundgren =

Swedish painter and author (1815–1875)

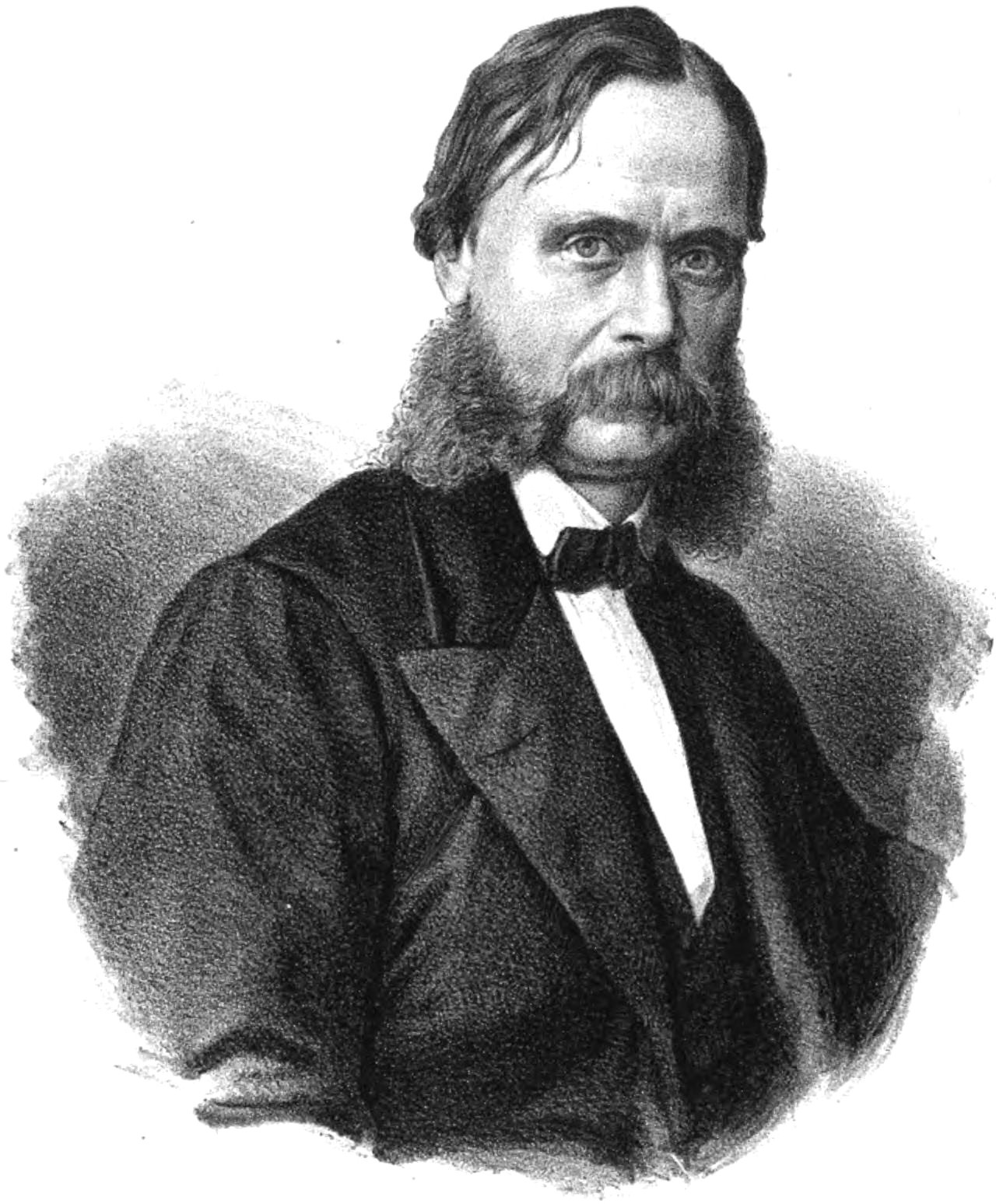
Egron Lundgren, from the Litografiskt allehanda (1865)

Egron Sellif Lundgren (18 December 1815, Stockholm – 16 December 1875, Stockholm) was a Swedish painter and author who specialized in watercolors.

== Biography ==
His father, Erik Lundgren, was a manufacturer. After 1829, he studied at the Teknologiska institutet with a focus on "bergshantering" (a form of resource management). After graduating, he worked in Eskilstuna and at the cannon foundry in Finspång. This type of work was apparently not to his liking as, in 1835, he enrolled at the Royal Swedish Academy of Fine Arts to pursue a childhood interest in watercolors. He studied there until 1839, then went to Paris, where he copied paintings in the Louvre and took advanced courses in the studios of Léon Cogniet.

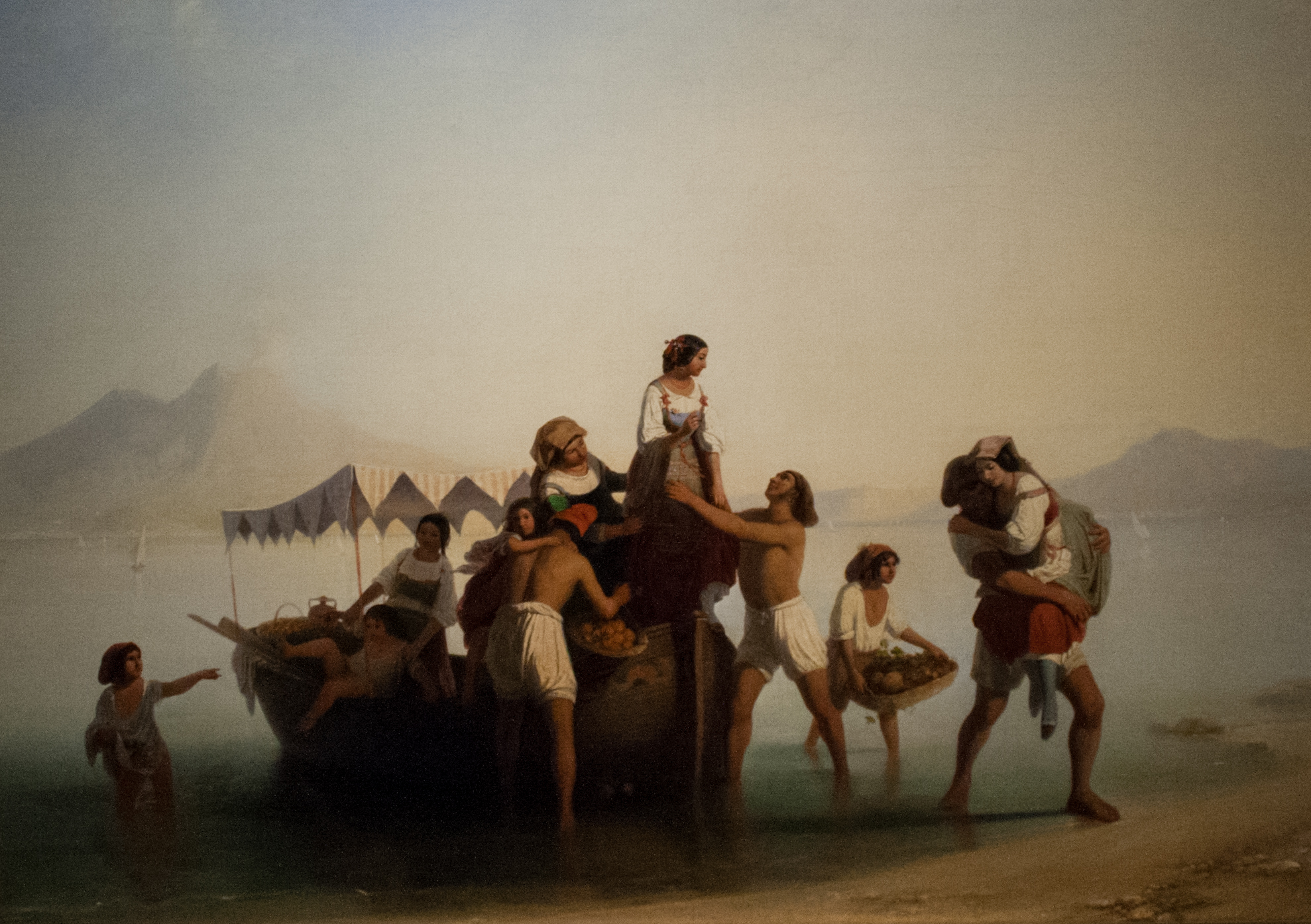
Neapolitan Fruit Sellers

From 1841 to 1849, he lived in Italy; mostly with the Scandinavian community in Rome, then spent four years in Spain. In both places, he produced historical and folkloric scenes; mostly done in watercolors. Thanks to scholarships from the Royal Academy, he was also able to spend some time studying in Munich and Vienna. In Spain, he largely abandoned oil painting and gave up the idea of being a history painter. Instead, he focused on genre scenes, featuring the local people, market life and public festivities.

=== London and India ===
In 1850, he became a member of the Royal Academy and was offered a professorship in 1853. Instead, he accepted an invitation from friends to come to London, where he lived until 1867, working primarily as a portrait painter. He also portrayed Royal ceremonies at court and produced scenes from the plays of Shakespeare. With London as his base, he travelled widely.

In 1858, a company in Manchester engaged him to visit India and make sketches of the Sepoy Mutiny. Under Queen Victoria's protection, he was able to travel with the British Army, which had taken over military operations from the East India Company. He stayed for a year, until the rebellion was over; creating more than 500 drawings and watercolors, as well as a few oil paintings. They became some of his best known works.

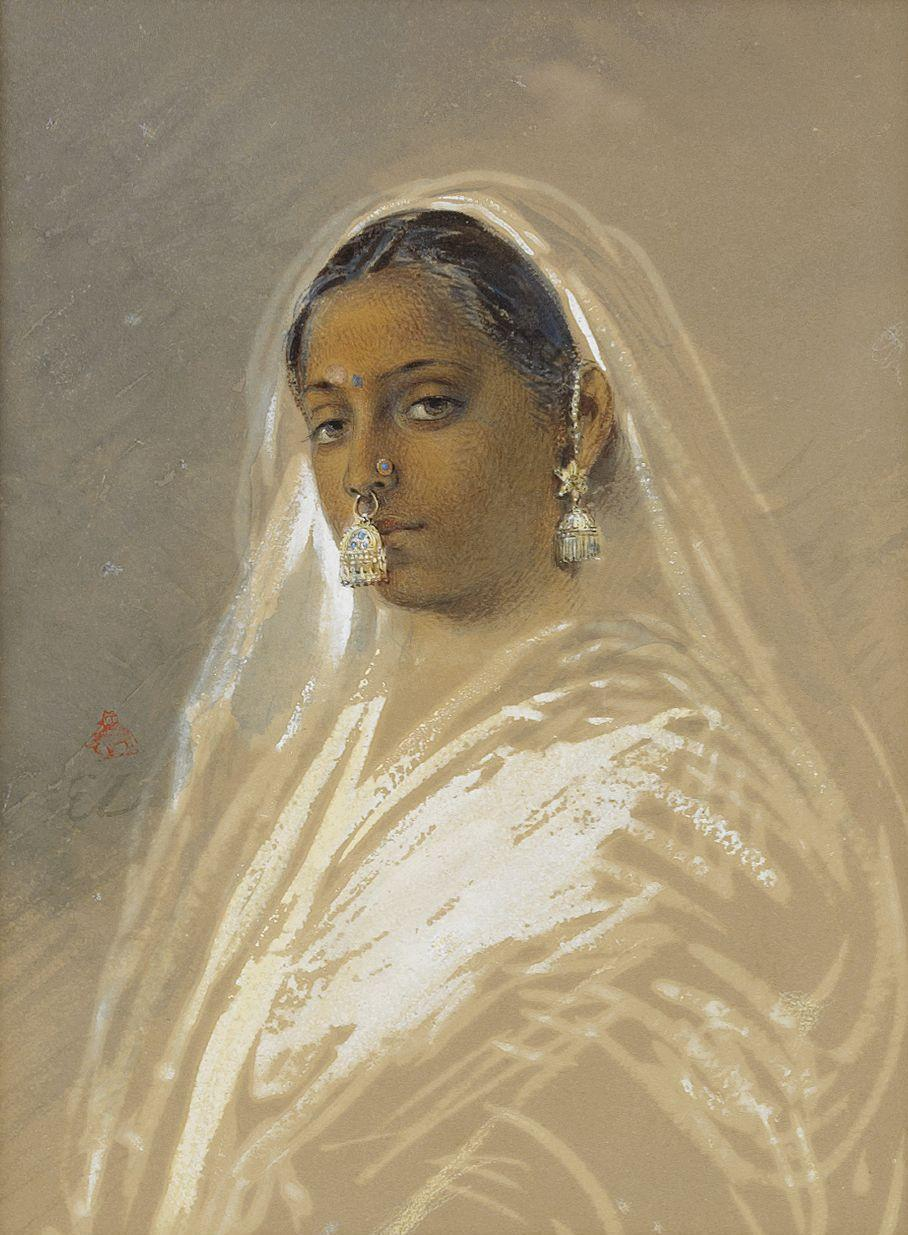
A Lady of Rank

In 1864, he was elected a member of the Royal Watercolour Society. He continued his travels throughout the 1860s, visiting Norway, Egypt, Spain and Italy and making his first trip back to Sweden. Although he returned there permanently in 1867, he generally spent the winters elsewhere. He made his last trip to Italy in 1873. His final years were all spent at home, in Stockholm, where he painted landscapes and published a collection of his letters and diaries called En målares anteckningar 1 - 2 (A Painter's Notes), compiled from earlier publications. In 1905, a comprehensive edition was issued by the National Library.

His works may be seen at the Nationalmuseum and the Göteborgs konstmuseum. "Egron Lundgrens väg", a street in Södra Ängby, is named after him.

== Writings by Lundgren online ==
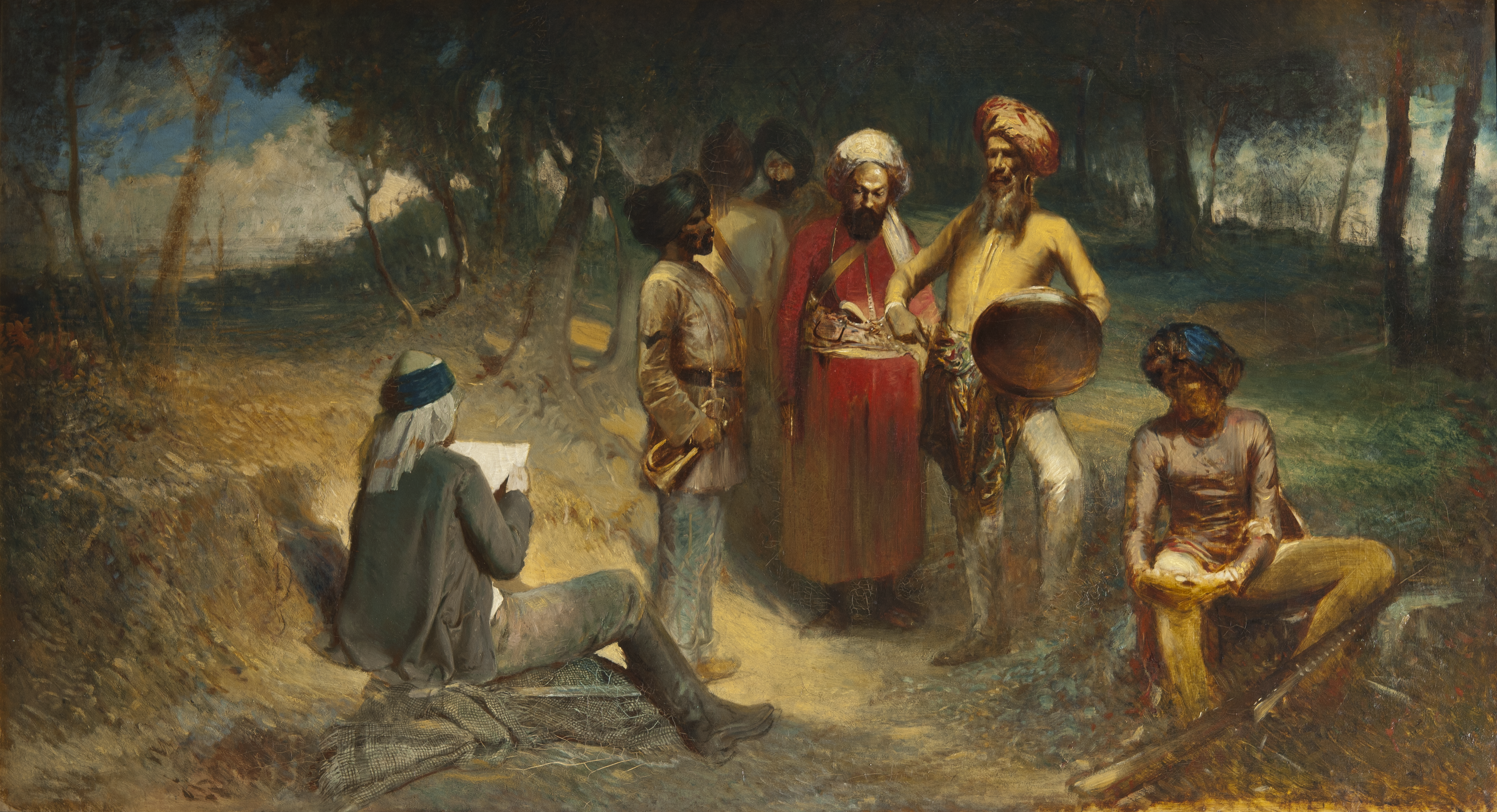
Examining the Spy

- "En målares anteckningar. Utdrag ur dagböcker och bref" @ Project Runeberg
- "Reseskildringar, anteckningar och bref" @ Project Runeberg
