= 1896 in Sweden =

- Decades: 1870s; 1880s; 1890s; 1900s; 1910s
- See also: Other events of 1896; Timeline of Swedish history

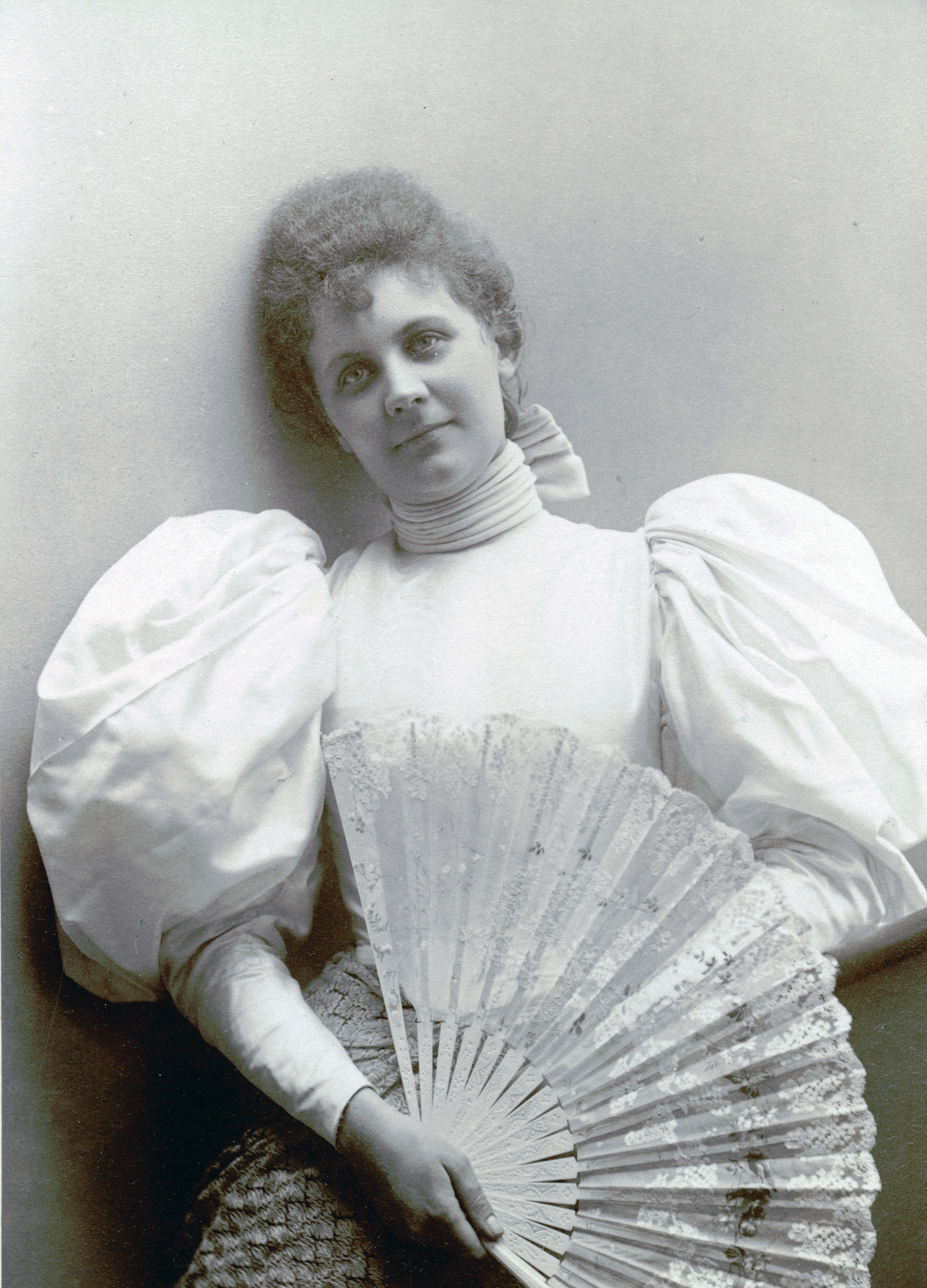
Eva Nyblom

Events from the year 1896 in Sweden

== Incumbents ==
- Monarch – Oscar II
- Prime Minister – Erik Gustaf Boström.

== Events ==
- AIK Fotboll is founded.
- Eskilstuna Guif is created.
- Lundsbergs boarding school is established.
- Svenska Mästerskapet
- Broxvik Drama, a cause célèbre, takes place.
- The Swedish National Council of Women is founded by Ellen Fries.
- Nya smedjegården is closed and demolished.

== Births ==
- 6 May – Rolf Maximilian Sievert, medical physicist (died 1966)
- 25 November – Tore Holm, sailor (died 1977).
- 20 December – Arvid Andersson-Holtman, gymnast (died 1992).

== Deaths ==
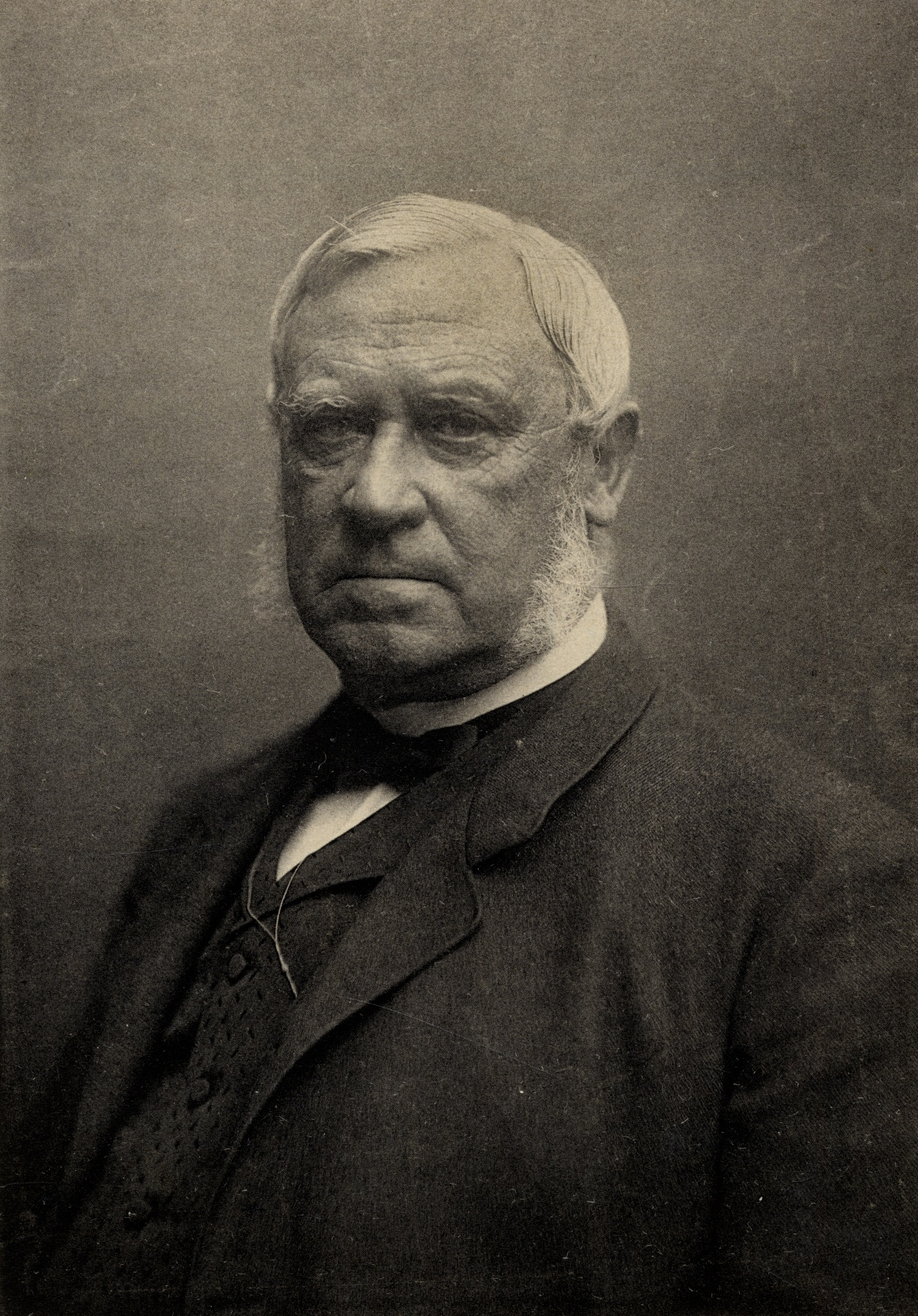
Louis Gerhard De Geer, 1st Prime Minister of Sweden.

- 19 October - Emmy Rappe, the first trained nurse in Sweden (born 1835)
- 24 September – Louis Gerhard De Geer, baron (born 1818)
- Kloka Anna i Vallåkra, divine visionary and natural healer (born 1820)
- 9 March - Hanna Winge, painter (born 1838)
- December 10 Alfred Nobel engineer (born 1833 in Sweden)
