= Vilhelm Pettersson =

Swedish ballet dancer (1814–1854)

Per Johan Vilhelm Pettersson (1814–1854), was a Swedish ballet dancer. He was an elite member of first the Royal Swedish Ballet during the mid-19th-century, and a deputy ballet master.

Vilhelm Pettersson was reportedly from a poor background as the son of laborers. During his childhood, he was once asked to perform a simple extra role in a ballet performance, and liked it so much that he wished to become a dancer.

He became a student of the Royal Swedish Ballet in 1826, a premier student in 1834, a second dancer in 1835, and a premier- and grotesque dancer in 1838–54. During the 1830s, he was referred to as one of the male stars of the ballet alongside Anders Selinder, Per Christian Johansson and Carl Wilhelm Silfverberg. He was deputy Ballet Master of the Royal Ballet from 1846 to 1851.

It was said of him:

"Pettersson had quite long legs, which he displayed around him in his Grotesque dance with careless extravagance, and when he toured the countryside during the summer vacation with Edvard Stjernström and mrs Friebel, the Kalmar Newspaper announced that a new theater building should be erected to make more room for the pas de chasse of mr Pettersson and a smoother floor for the pretty little feet of the Sylphic Mrs Friebel."

Aside from his dance career, he is described as a self-educated autodidact, and was offered an office as an assistant numismatic expert at the Royal Swedish Academy of Letters, History and Antiquities in 1854, shortly before he died of an illness.
