= Dalecarlian Rebellion of 1743 =

Peasant uprising in Sweden

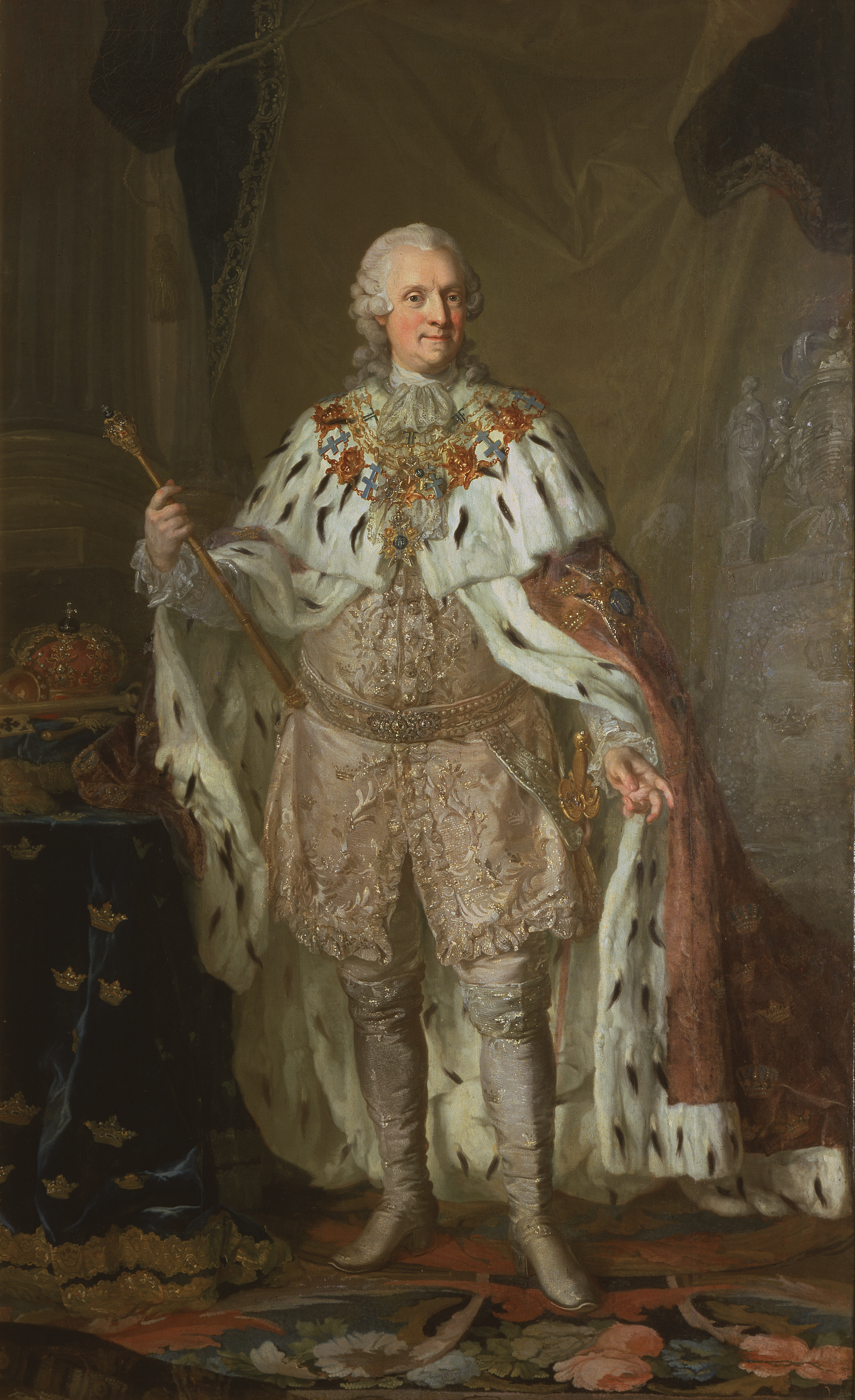
- Painting of Adolf Fredrik by Lorens Pasch the Younger.
Date	1743
Location	Sweden
Result	Uprising quelled

Belligerents
Sweden	Dalecarlian peasants Supported by Uppsala

Commanders and leaders
Adolf Frederick	Gustaf Schedin (executed); Skinnar Per Andersson (executed); Holbert Anders Ersson (executed); Smeds-Anders Mattson (executed); Erik Hansson (executed); Karl Olovsson Beronius (executed); Vilhelm Gustaf Wrangel (POW); Jöns Landberg (POW)

The Dalecarlian Rebellion of 1743 (Swedish: Stora daladansen; lit. 'Great Dalecarlian Dance'), also known as the Fourth Dalecarlian Rebellion, was a rebellion that broke out in the Swedish province of Dalecarlia in 1743. Its cause was the peasants' dissatisfaction with the "lords' government" of the Age of Liberty. This dissatisfaction was strongest in Dalecarlia, partly because the Hats had introduced restrictions in the Dalecarlians' free exchange of goods with neighboring Norway, but mainly because of the unlucky Russo-Swedish War (1741–43) to which the peasants had to provide soldiers. It was the last major uprising in Sweden to have started in rural areas.

== Background ==
At the time of the revolt, there was widespread discontent with the parliamentary system among the peasantry, who considered their representatives in the Riksdag of the Estates powerless to the three other estates, and that the monarchs of the absolute monarchy had listened better to their complaints. An epidemic and famine after the failed harvest of 1742, caused the ban from trade with the Norwegian border, increased the dissatisfaction, as did the Battle of Villmanstrand with its great losses for the Dalecarlia Regiment. The dissatisfaction was directed toward the crisis in the succession to the throne after the childless Frederick I of Sweden. The idea that an election of Peter of Holstein-Gottorp, grandson of Hedvig Sophia of Sweden and nephew of Empress Elizabeth of Russia, would result in an end of the hated war and a chance for a change in the constitution, spread in Dalecarlia, were the peasantry was ready to enforce it by a revolt. When Peter was elected heir to the Russian throne, crown prince Frederick of Denmark became the preferred candidate of the peasantry.

During the summer of 1742, riots and opposition toward the draft of soldiers occurred in several provinces in Sweden, as well as discontent among their soldiers in the regiment in the capital of Stockholm. This resulted in a stop of the drafts and the peasantry arming themselves toward the authorities instead. On 8 March 1743, the representatives of the peasantry stated their demands in the Riksdag and demanded a stop of the drafts, the punishment of the generals responsible for the Battle of Villmanstrand and the election of crown prince Frederick of Denmark as heir to the throne. Their demands were refused.

== Rebellion ==
The rebellion in Helsingia were subdued, but open rebellion broke out in Dalecarlia 30 May, and on 11 June, a rebel army marched from Dalecarlia toward the capital. They brought with them the county governor and a couple of officials as prisoners, but kept a good discipline on their march. They were supported by the peasantry on their way and joined by hundreds of supporters as well as supplies. Some of the cities, such as Uppsala, gave support, while others, such as Sala, did not and forced them to pay for their supply.

On 19 June, an agreement was made at the peace conference with the Russian empress that Adolf Frederick of Holstein-Gottorp were to be elected heir to the Swedish throne in exchange for the return of the Swedish province of Finland. On 20 June, the rebel army peacefully entered the capital of Stockholm, after the king had ordered that no shots be fired by the garrison. The government unsuccessfully attempted to persuade the rebels to accept the election of the new heir. On 22 June, the rebels were surrounded by several regiments at the Gustav Adolfs torg, Stockholm, and given the ultimatum to surrender before five o'clock or be regarded as traitors. The Västergötland Cavalry Regiment attacked the rebels, who answered by firing a canon. The one firing the canon was shot by an officer, after which the rebels attacked. The regiments of Uppland and Västmanland refused to attack, but the Älvsborg Regiment fired, killing 150 men and captured 3000.

== Aftermath ==
Six of the leaders of the rebellion were condemned to death and executed. Of the rest of the thousand rebels imprisoned in Stockholm, some were given fines and physical punishment, but the majority were pardoned after having sworn an oath of loyalty after their parishes had sent in an appeal for them: many, however, died of sickness in the prisons due to the poor hygienic conditions. Several other provinces had made preparations to march to the capital, but the plans were abandoned. Then news came of the Dalecarlians defeat in Stockholm. The government successfully asked for troops from the Russian empress to protect Sweden from an attack from Denmark due to the Danish dissatisfaction with the outcome in the election of an heir to the Swedish throne. The Russian protective troops consisted of 30 galleys, anchoring by the Swedish shores for a couple of months that year, before returning to Russia.

== See also ==
- Dalecarlian Rebellions
