= Catharina Charlotta Swedenmarck =

Swedish-Finnish writer and poet

- Born: 29 January 1744; Jakob and Johannes parish
- Died: 21 September 1813 (aged 69); Kirkkonummi
- Occupation: Poet, playwright

Catharina Charlotta Swedenmarck (29 January 1744, Stockholm - 1813 Sundsbergs gård, Kyrkslätt), was a Swedish-Finnish writer and poet. Her play Dianas fest (The Feast of Diana) from 1775 is referred to as the first original work of its kind produced by a female during the Gustavian age.

== Personal life ==
The parentage of Catharina Charlotta Swedenmarck is unknown but her father is believed to have been a clerk. She married first to lieutenant Carl Johan Hastfer (d. 1771). As a widow she met with economical difficulties but was given assistance by the patronage of the courtier Baron Axel Gabriel Leijonhufvud. In 1773, she married major Carl Fredrik Toll, who was the owner of three mansions in Nyland in Finland.

== Works ==
- Öfwer Högstsalige Hans Kongl. Maj:ts Konung Adolpf Friedrichs död. (1771)
- Poëme, öfver Hans Kongl. Maj:ts Konung Gustaf III:s högsthugneliga kröning, d. 29 Maji 1772. (1772);
- Skalde-Bref, I anledning af Hans Kongl. Maj:ts Kon. Gustaf III Höga Namns-Dag, d. 6 Jul. 1773. (1773);
- Skalde-Qwäde, Öfwer Hans Maj:ts, Konung Gustaf:s Resa til Norrske Gränsen, uti Novemb. 1772. (1774);
- Afsked af Sommaren. Qwäde. Samlaren 1775; Dianas fest. Herdaspel uti en Act. (1775)

== Sources ==
- SWEDENMARCK, Catharina Charlotta, Publicerad i Biografiskt lexikon för Finland 1. Svenska tiden (2008).
- Ann Öhrberg: Fasa för all flärd, konstlan och förställning” Den ideala retorn inom 1700-talets nya offentlighet. Samlaren. 2010
- "Litterär pionjär värd att uppmärksamma", Michel Ekman, 2004-07-19, Svenska Dagbladet
- Carina Burman, Den finländska Sapfo. Catharina Charlotta Swedenmarcks liv och verk (Lunne böcker, 2004)
