= 1747 in Sweden =

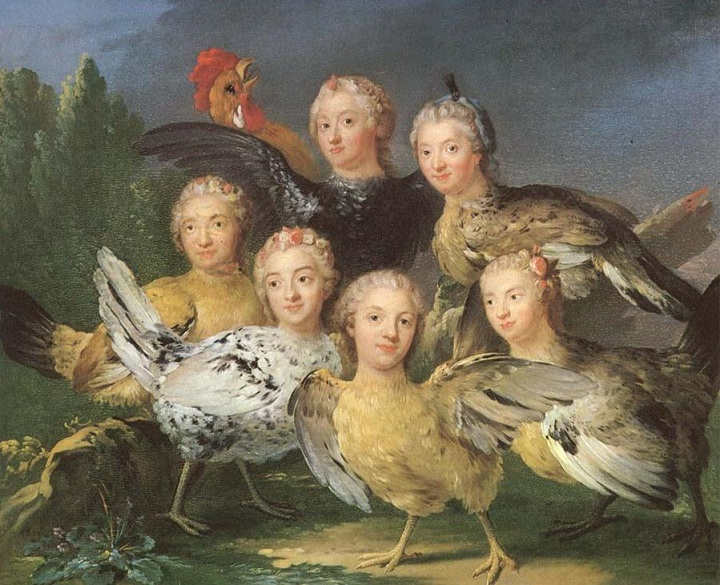
Johan Pasch 01

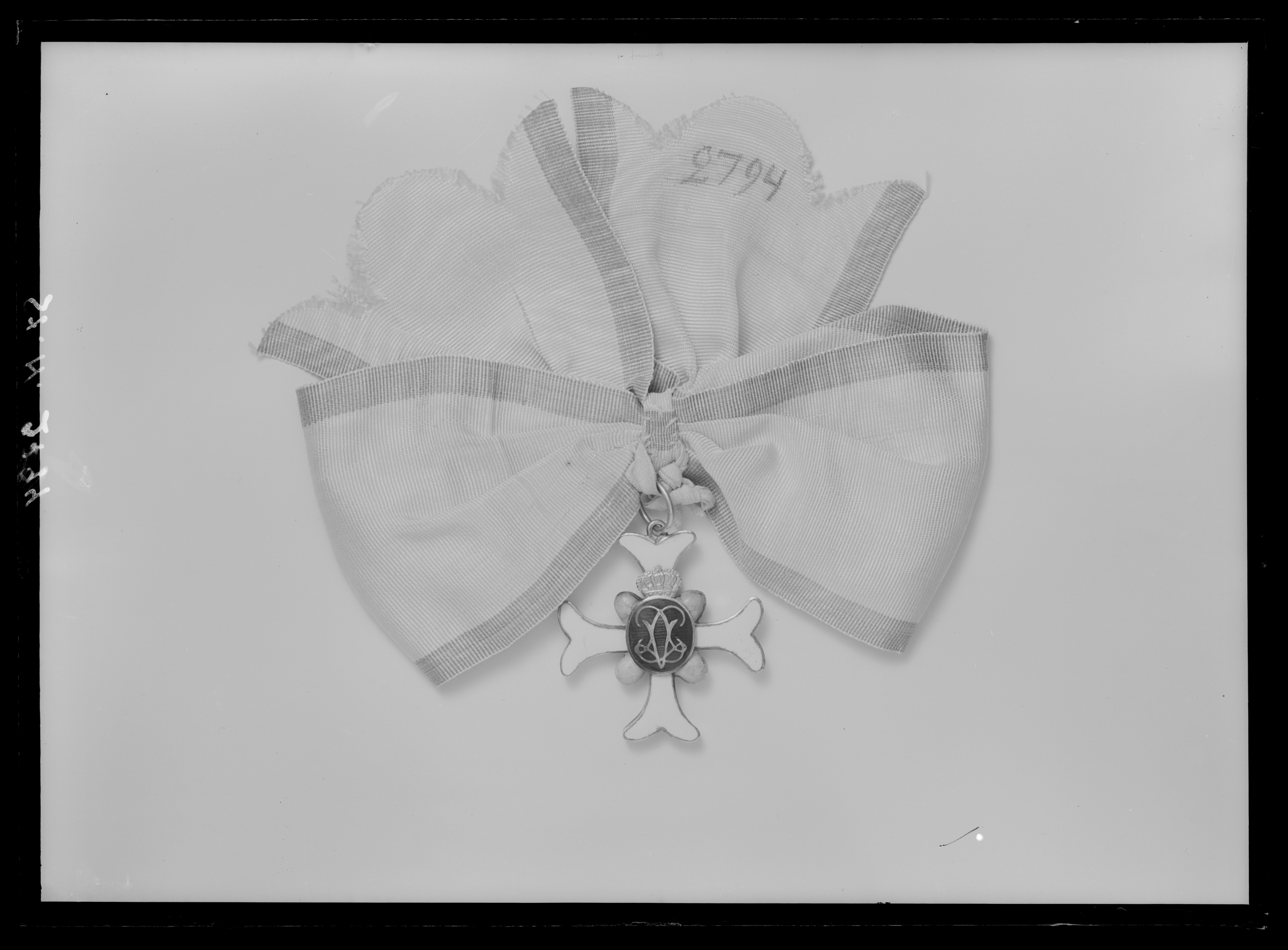

Events from the year 1747 in Sweden

== Incumbents ==
- Monarch – Frederick I

== Events ==
- May - Alliance between Sweden and France; Sweden is to receive subsidies.
- May - Defense alliance between Sweden and Prussia.
- 5 December – Carl Gustaf Tessin President of the Riksdag.
- - The government of the Hats (party) has the physician of the monarch, A. Blackwell, executed for treason.
- - Pehr Kalm travel to North America.
- The Vadstena adliga jungfrustift begin its activity.

== Births ==
- 26 March - Elis Schröderheim, politician (died 1795)
- - Adolf Ludvig Hamilton, politician, memoir writer (died 1802)
- 24 February - Ulla von Liewen, royal lover (died 1775)
- - Maria Aurora Uggla, royal favorite (died 1826)
- - Margareta Seuerling, actress (died 1820)
- 25 July - Johanna Lohm, educator (died 1834)
- Carl Johan Ingman, spy (died 1813)

== Deaths ==
- 19 June – Jakob Benzelius, archbishop (born 1683)
- 8 August - Mårten Triewald, engineer and physicist (born 1691)
