= Carl Johan Ingman =

Swedish diplomatic secretary and spy

Carl Johan Ingman (1747 - 1813) was a Swedish diplomatic secretary and spy.

Ingman was secretary in the Swedish embassy in Dresden 1775-76 and Russia 1776-77 and chargé d'affaires in Russia in 1777, but escaped from his debts to Norway, where he lived until 1788, after which he moved to Denmark. During the Theatre War of 1788–90, he acted as a Swedish spy in Copenhagen, Denmark.
