= Matilda Kristina von Schwerin =

Swedish countess and landowner

Matilda Kristina von Schwerin née Hagberg (1818 – 1892) was a Swedish countess and landowner. She was a central figure in two great scandals in 19th-century Sweden; when her future husband's brother sued him for his intending marriage to her on accusations of incest (1841–44) and when her late husband's brother refused to acknowledge her legal right to her inheritance and dower land after her late spouse (1849–56), known in history as the 'Schwerin Estate's Scandals'.

== Life ==
=== Early life ===
She was the daughter of an employee of the Royal Lottery, Lorentz August Hagberg, and Christina Carolina Schelin of Stockholm. Her mother was the mistress of the rich landowner count Curt Philip von Schwerin (1795-1849), and when Matilda Kristina's father died, she and her siblings moved from Stockholm to the estate of von Schwerin in Östergötland. Her mother was formally employed as the housekeeper of von Schwerin, but she was known to be his mistress and their relationship was a scandal: von Schwerin's brother and heir, the courtier Adolf Henning von Schwerin (1799-1878), was reportedly afraid that his unmarried, childless brother would marry his mistress.

Curt Philip von Schwerin was one of the richest landowners in Sweden, owner of a number of estates such as Husby, Fyllingarum, Sverkersholm, Borkhult, Gobo, Odensgöl, Ekhammar and Åketorp. However, von Schwerin, though owner and resident on his estate, did not have financial control over his properties, as his inability to handle the inherited debts of his late owner and predecessor had resulted in his estates coming under the legal administration of his brother, an official of the royal court, who was in fact his heir.

=== First scandal ===
In 1841, Curt Philip von Schwerin announced that he would marry, not his mistress, but her daughter, Matilda Kristina. He was sued by his heir and brother Adolf Henning von Schwerin, who accused his brother of intent to commit a crime, as a marriage to the daughter of his mistress would juridically be defined as incest by the laws of prohibited degree of kinship. This led to a three year long legal process, including testimonies regarding the sexual relationship between Curt Philip von Schwerin and Christina Carolina Hagberg, before the court declared Curt Philip von Schwerin free to marry Matilda Kristina Hagberg in 1844. The legal process was a three year long scandal in contemporary Sweden.

Count Curt Philip von Schwerin married Matilda Kristina Hagberg in 1844, and granted her three of his estates, Husby, Fyllingarum and Sverkersholm, as her dower lands. The marriage was described as happy but childless.

=== Second scandal ===
When her spouse died in 1849, Matilda Kristina von Schwerin inherited a fortune as well as the three estates granted her as dower lands, while the ownership of the von Schwerin family's estates was inherited by her late husband's brother Adolf Henning von Schwerin. She was immediately sued by von Schwerin, who refused to acknowledge her right to the dower estates. This second court case lasted for seven years, until the court, in 1856, acknowledged the legal right of Matilda Kristina von Schwerin to the three estate granted to her as dowers. The case was a scandal which attracted a lot of attention in contemporary Sweden, particularly within the upper classes, where the sympathies where on the side of the widow, and Adolf Henning von Schwerin made a donation of 100,000 riksdaler to Riddarhuset to soften the dislike his actions had caused his name in public opinion.

=== Later life ===
After the process had been completed in 1856, Matilda Kristina von Schwerin lived the rest of her life managing her dower estates and was one of the richest women in Sweden at the time, described as: "She was tender and charitable toward her subordinates, hosted a hospitable home and benefited the fortune of her siblings in the world. She left a memory of an in all aspects respectable and good person", and willed her fortune to siblings, nephews and nieces and to the foundation of an orphanage in Söderköping.
