= 1820 in Sweden =

- Years in Sweden: 1817 1818 1819 1820 1821 1822 1823
- Centuries: 18th century · 19th century · 20th century
- Decades: 1790s 1800s 1810s 1820s 1830s 1840s 1850s
- Years: 1817 1818 1819 1820 1821 1822 1823

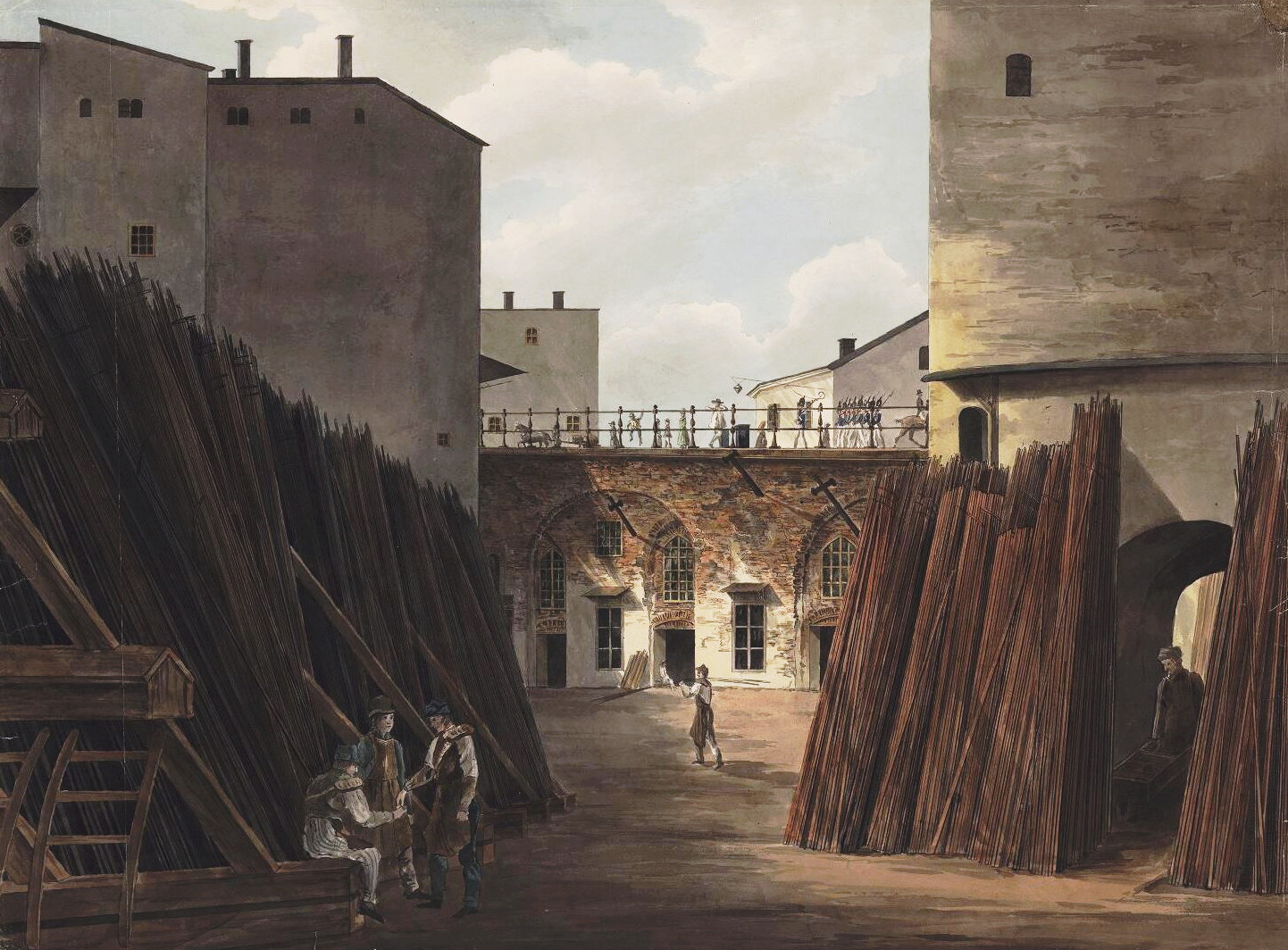

Events from the year 1820 in Sweden

== Incumbents ==
- Monarch – Charles XIV John

== Events ==
- - Foundation of the Swedbank
- - Nattvardsbarnen by Esaias Tegnér.
- - Markalls sömnlösa nätter (1820–21) by Per Adam Wallmark.
- - Runesvärdet av Karl August Nicander
- - Senare dikter af Vitalis by Erik Sjöberg
- - The Wolf of Gysinge killed its first victim

== Births ==
- 6 October – Jenny Lind, opera singer (died 1887).
- - Anna-Kajsa Norman, folk musician (died 1903)
- - Kloka Anna i Vallåkra, religious visionary and natural healer (died 1896)

== Deaths ==
- 16 February – Georg Carl von Döbeln, war hero (born 1758)
- 25 May – Eric Ruuth, governor general (born 1746)
- - Charlotte Du Rietz, love interest of Gustav III (born 1744)
