= 1746 in Sweden =

Events from the year 1746 in Sweden

== Incumbents ==
- Monarch – Frederick I

== Events ==
- - A new sumptuary law bans the use of hooped skirts wider than 4.5 ells.
- 9 December – Carl Gustaf Tessin succeed Carl Gyllenborg as Privy Council Chancellery.
- - Eva Ekeblad present the result of how to make flour and alcohol out of potatoes to the Royal Swedish Academy of Sciences.

== Births ==
- 24 January [O.S. 13 January] — Gustav III of Sweden, Monarch (d. 1792)
- 31 January [O.S. 20 January] — Pehr Hörberg, Artist, Painter and Musician (d. 1816)
- 24 February [O.S. 13 February] — Uno von Troil, Archbishop of Uppsala (d. 1803)
- 24 April [O.S.13 April] — Ulrika Fredrika Bremer, Ship owner, Merchant (d. 1798)
- 20 May [O.S. 9 May] — Andreas Berlin, Naturalist (d. 1773)
- 2 October [O.S. 21 September] — Peter Jacob Hjelm, Chemist, isolated the element Molybdenum (d. 1813)
- 24 October [O.S. 13 October] — Eric Ruuth, Nobleman, Governor-general of Swedish Pomerania (d. 1820)
- 14 December [O.S. 3 December] — Julie Alix de la Fay, Ballerina (d. 1826)
- 1746 — Lovisa Simson, Theatre director (d. 1808)
- 1746 — Hedda Piper, Courtier (d. 1812)
- 1746 — Lars Regnér, Astronomer (d. 1810)

== Deaths ==
- 9 December – Carl Gyllenborg, Politician, Statesman and Author (b. 1679)
- [O.S. 11 December] – Johan Casper Printz, Swedish Navy officer with the rank of schoutbynacht (b. 1671)
