= 1811 in Sweden =

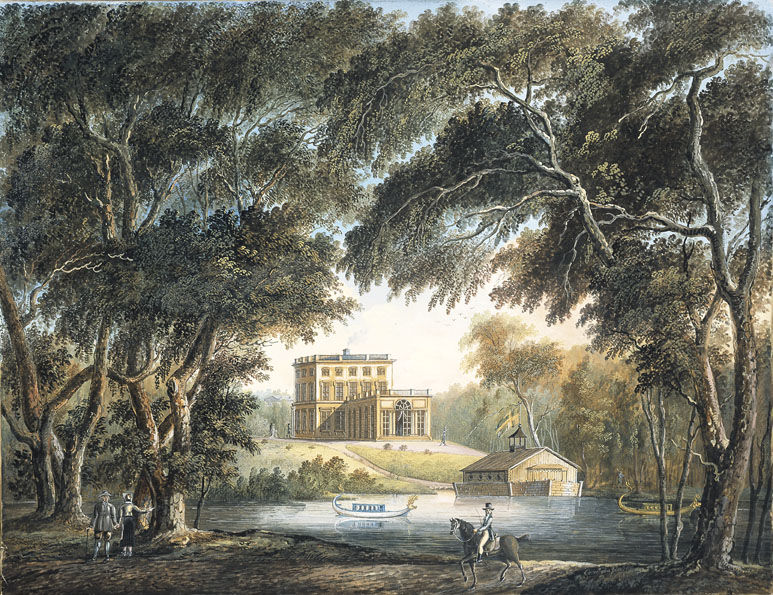
Hagaparken 1811

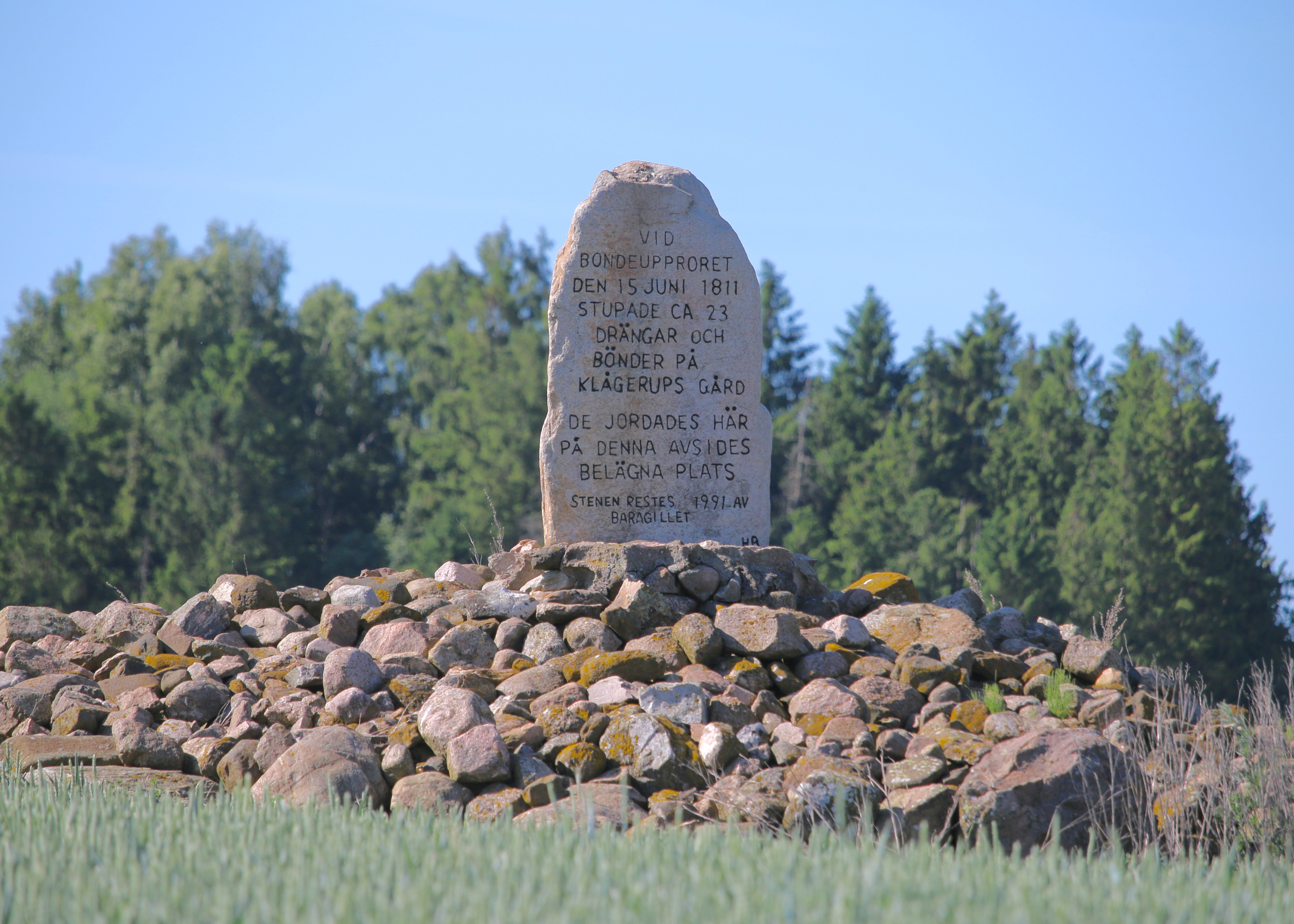
Memorial for those killed in the riots 1811

Events from the year 1811 in Sweden

== Incumbents ==
- Monarch – Charles XIII
- Crown Prince - Jean-Baptiste Bernadotte

== Events ==
- June - The peasant rebellion Klågerupskravallerna takes place in the province of Scania.
- - The Royal Swedish Academy of Agriculture and Forestry is founded.
- - The Crown Princess, Désirée Clary, leaves Sweden for France, where she lives estranged from her spouse until 1823.
- - The creation of the Order of Charles XIII.
- - Married businesswomen are granted the right to make decisions about their own businesses without their husband's consent.

== Births ==
- 31 August – Adolfina Fägerstedt, ballerina (died 1902)
- 1 September – Richard Dybeck, jurist, antiquarian, and lyricist (died 1877)
- 17 September – August Blanche, journalist, novelist, and a socialist politician (died 1868)
- Malla Höök, actress and courtesan (died 1882)

== Deaths ==
- 5 August – Adolf Ulrik Wertmüller, painter (born 1751)
- 14 September - Johanna Löfblad, Swedish actor and singer (born 1733)
