= 1750 in Sweden =

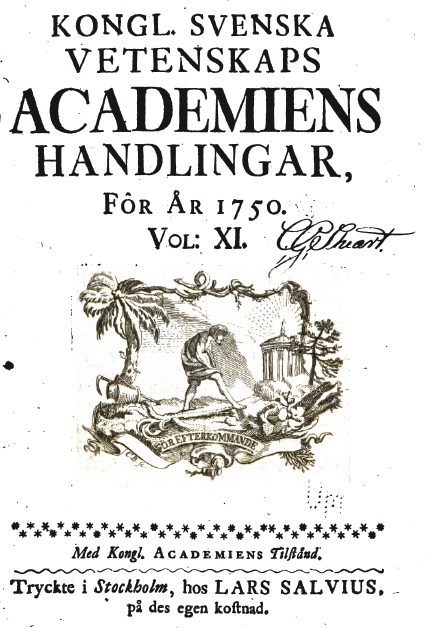

Events from the year 1750 in Sweden

== Incumbents ==
- Monarch – Frederick I

== Births ==
- 18 July - Prince Frederick Adolf of Sweden, prince (died 1803)
- 19 July - Johan Gabriel Oxenstierna, poet (died 1818)
- 8 October - Adam Afzelius, botanist and an apostle of Carl Linnaeus (died 1837)

== Deaths ==
- 29 January - Sophia Schröder, concert soprano (born 1712)
- 25 April - Olof Hiorter, astronomer (born 1696)
- 17 May - Georg Engelhard Schröder, painter (born 1684)
