= 1816 in Sweden =

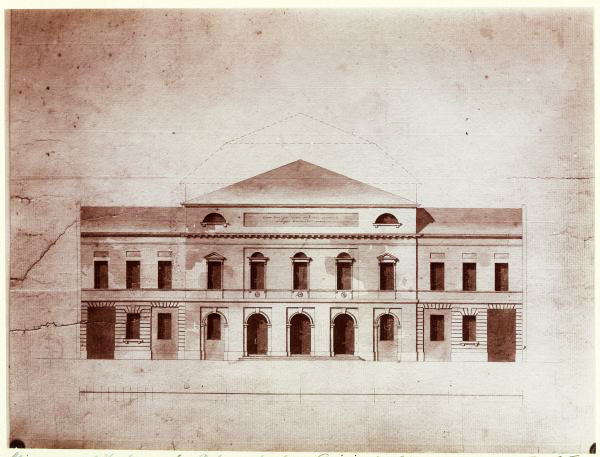
Segerlindska teatern

Events from the year 1816 in Sweden

== Incumbents ==
- Monarch – Charles XIII

== Events ==
- Sweden joins the Holy Alliance.
- Inauguration of the Segerlindska teatern in Gothenburg.

== Births ==
- 3 February – Carl Olof Rosenius, preacher, author and editor (died 1868)
- 18 March – Louise von Fersen, heiress (died 1879)
- 12 June – Nils Blommér, painter (died 1853)
- 23 June – Fredrik Wilhelm Scholander, architect, painter and composer (died 1881)
- 2 July – Wilhelmina Josephson, pianist (died 1906)
- 14 July – Fredrika Limnell, salonnière, women's right activist, philanthropist (died 1897)
- 21 August – Jeanette Berglind, sign language teacher and principal (died 1903)
- 12 September – Aurora von Qvanten, writer and artist (died 1907)
- 20 September – Fredrik August Dahlgren, writer (died 1895)
- 11 October – Edvard Stjernström, stage actor and theater director (died 1877)
- 26 December – Aurore Storckenfeldt, educator (died 1900)

== Deaths ==
- 14 January – Rutger Macklean, a driving figure in the reorganization of agricultural lands in Sweden that made possible large-scale farming with its economy of scale (born 1742)
- 24 January – Pehr Hörberg, artist (born 1746)
- 6 February – Henrik Gahn
- 11 February – Sophie Piper, courtier (born 1757)
- 27 July – Olof Tempelman, architect (born 1745)
