= 1812 in Sweden =

Events from the year 1812 in Sweden

== Incumbents ==
- Monarch – Charles XIII

== Events ==
- 23 February - Elise Frösslind, makes her breakthrough in the success of Cendrillon by Charles Etienne on the Royal Swedish Opera in Stockholm.
- 24 March - Treaty of Saint Petersburg (1812).
- 30 May - The Magic Flute by Wolfgang Amadeus Mozart on the Royal Swedish Opera in Stockholm.
- 8 July - Treaty of Örebro.
- - Inauguration of Askersunds flickskola in Askersund.
- - A new law permit forced examination of any one suspected of carrying sexual transmitted disease.
- - Sorgespelet Prins Gustaf, by Lorenzo Hammarsköld
- - Flyttfåglarna, by Esaias Tegnér

== Births ==
- 22 February - Emily Nonnen, writer (died 1905)
- 20 April - Maria Paulina Åhman, harpist, the first female instrumentalist in the royal chapel (died 1904)
- 29 April - Emilie Högqvist, actress (died 1846)
- 19 May - Herman Sätherberg, poet and physician (died 1892)
- 30 June - Josabeth Sjöberg, artist (died 1882)
- 29 October – Louise Granberg, playwright, translator and theatre director (died 1907)
- 4 November-Abraham Fornander, journalist, judge, and ethnologist (died 1887)
- Carolina Lindström, milliner (died 1892)
- 4 May - Amalia Redec, pianist and composer (died 1885)

== Deaths ==
- Hedda Piper, courtier (born 1746)
