= 1817 in Sweden =

Events from the year 1817 in Sweden

== Incumbents ==
- Monarch – Charles XIII

== Events ==
- 16 February – Förlofningen by Dorothea Dunckel has its premier at the Aurora ordens teater.
- - The first suggestion to abolish the legal minority of adult unmarried women is discussed in the Riksdag.
- - Samuel Owen constructs the first Paddle steamer in Sweden.
- - Gustaf Fredrik Wirsén inducted full member, and Justina Casagli, Elisabet Frösslind, Anna Sofia Sevelin and Jeanette Wässelius made associée of the Royal Swedish Academy of Music.
- - Filippo Taglioni appointed ballet master at the Royal Swedish Ballet.

== Births ==
- 21 February – Fanny Westerdahl, stage actress (died 1873)
- 24 March – Fritz von Dardel, artist (died 1901)
- 10 July – Wilhelmina Bonde, courtier (died 1899)
- 6 September - Helga de la Brache, impostor (died 1885)
- 2 October - Gunnar Wennerberg
- 6 October – Gustaf Lagerbjelke, poet composer and politician (died 1901)
- – Sophia Wilkens, reform educator of disabled people (died 1873)

== Deaths ==
- 8 March - Anna Maria Lenngren, poet (born 1754)
