= 1899 in Sweden =

- Decades: 1870s; 1880s; 1890s; 1900s; 1910s
- See also: Other events of 1899; Timeline of Swedish history

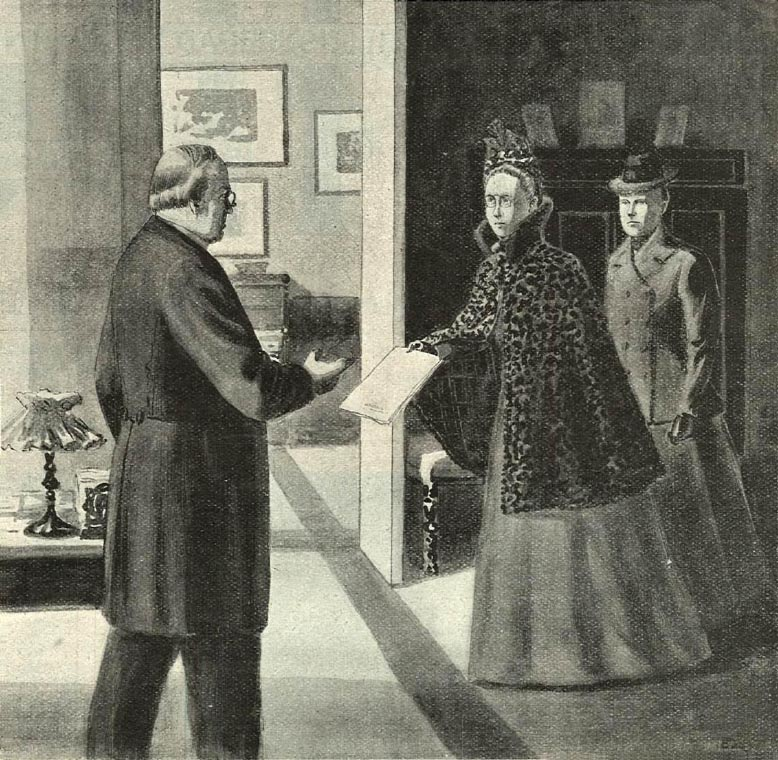
Agda Montelius and Gertrud Adelborg presents the petition of woman suffrage to Prime Minister Erik Gustaf Boström in 1899.

Events from the year 1899 in Sweden

== Incumbents ==
- Monarch – Oscar II
- Prime Minister – Erik Gustaf Boström

== Events ==
- 5 September - Kooperativa Förbundet is founded
- 22 September - In the 1899 Swedish general election, the Lantmanna Party retains majority control.
- The Bus is introduced in Stockholm
- Åhléns
- Aurora (newspaper)
- Christian Workers Union of Sweden (1899)
- Djurgårdens IF Fotboll
- IFK Strängnäs
- IFK Kristianstad
- IFK Malmö Bandy
- IFK Malmö Fotboll
- Nässjö IF
- Reymersholms IK
- SoIK Hellas
- Stockholm Music Museum
- Svenska Fotbollpokalen
- Svenska Järnvägsmannaförbundet
- Swedish Sailors and Coalers Union
- Swedish Workers Union
- A delegation from the Fredrika Bremer Association presented a suggestion of women's suffrage to prime minister Erik Gustaf Boström. The delegation was headed by Agda Montelius, accompanied by Gertrud Adelborg, who had written the demand. This was the first time the Swedish women's movement themselves had officially presented a demand for suffrage.

== Births ==
- 23 April – Bertil Ohlin, born in Klippan, economist and politician who was jointly awarded the Nobel Memorial Prize in Economic Sciences in 1977 for his pathbreaking contribution to the theory of international trade and international capital movements (died 1979).
- 25 June – Princess Margaretha of Sweden, member of the Swedish Royal Family, born at Villa Parkudden on Djurgården in Stockholm, daughter of Prince Carl and Ingeborg of Denmark (died 1977).
- 5 October – Marcus Wallenberg Jr., banker and industrialist, born in Stockholm, CEO of Stockholms Enskilda Bank 1946–1958 (died 1982).

== Deaths ==
- 12 January – Clara Bonde, courtier (born 1806)
- 30 March – Selma Jacobsson, photographer (born 1841)
- 27 August – Wendela Hebbe, reporter, often called the first female reporter of her country (born 1808)
- 30 December – Axel Danielsson, socialist agitator (born 1863)
- Fredrique Paijkull, pioneer for the women's folk school in Sweden (born 1836)
- Karin Åhlin, educator (born 1830)
- Wilhelmina Bonde, courtier (born 1817)
