= 1822 in Sweden =

- Years in Sweden: 1819 1820 1821 1822 1823 1824 1825
- Centuries: 18th century · 19th century · 20th century
- Decades: 1790s 1800s 1810s 1820s 1830s 1840s 1850s
- Years: 1819 1820 1821 1822 1823 1824 1825

Events from the year 1822 in Sweden

== Incumbents ==
- Monarch – Charles XIV John

== Events ==
- Motala Verkstad is founded by Baltzar von Platen.
- The piracy trial of Johanna Hård.
- Inauguration of the National Portrait Gallery (Sweden).
- Amorina by Carl Jonas Love Almqvist.

== Births ==
- 14 February 1822 – Betty Boije, concert contralto and composer (died 1854)
- 13 February – Betty Linderoth, watchmaker (died 1900)
- 3 April – Elma Ström, Swedish opera singer (died 1889)
- 22 April – Bengt Nordenberg, painter (died 1902)

== Deaths ==
- 13 March – Nils Lorens Sjöberg, poet (born 1754)
- 16 March – Gustav Badin
- Maria Nilsdotter i Ölmeskog, farmer and heroine (born 1756)
