= 1821 in Sweden =

- Years in Sweden: 1818 1819 1820 1821 1822 1823 1824
- Centuries: 18th century · 19th century · 20th century
- Decades: 1790s 1800s 1810s 1820s 1830s 1840s 1850s
- Years: 1818 1819 1820 1821 1822 1823 1824

Events from the year 1821 in Sweden.

== Incumbents ==
- Monarch – Charles XIV John

== Events ==
- – First issue of the newly merged Post- och Inrikes Tidningar.
- 27 March – The Wolf of Gysinge was killed after having attacked 31 people over a three-month period.

== Births ==
- 24 February - Sven Adolf Hedlund, newspaper publisher and politician (died 1900)
- 2 March – Axel Adlercreutz, politician, civil servant, President of the Göta Court of Appeal, Prime Minister for Justice (died 1880)
- 1 April – Geskel Saloman, portrait and genre painter (died 1902)
- 6 May - Emelie Holmberg, composer, singer, pianist, music teacher and organist (died 1854)
- 21 September – Aurora Ljungstedt, horror writer (died 1908)
- 13 October – Oscar Byström, composer (died 1909)
- - Fanny Stål, classical pianist (died 1889)

== Deaths ==
- 15 March - Abraham Niclas Edelcrantz, poet and inventor (born 1754)
- 6 October – Anders Jahan Retzius, chemist, botanist and entomologist (born 1742)
