= 1826 in Sweden =

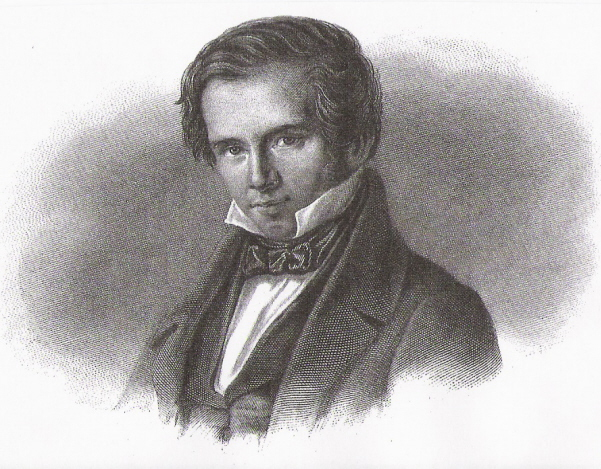
Karl August Nicander.

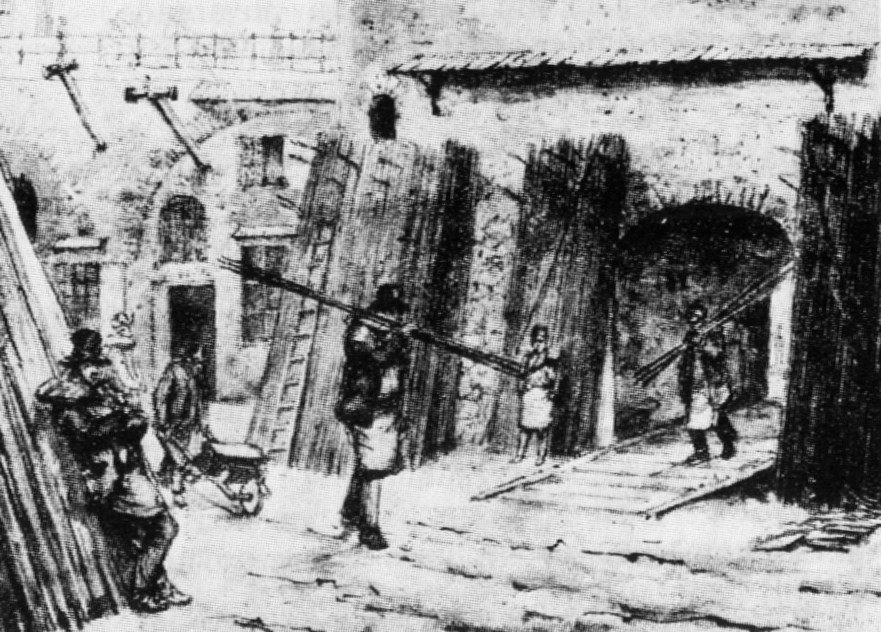
Järnbärare Wetterling 1826

Events from the year 1826 in Sweden

== Incumbents ==
- Monarch – Charles XIV John

== Events ==
- - Barnängens manufaktur is closed in Stockholm.

== Births ==
- 19 January - Rudolf Wall, publisher and journalist (died 1893)
- 15 February - Edvard Swartz, stage actor (died 1897)
- 18 February – Lea Ahlborn, metallist (died 1897)
- 3 May - Charles XV and IV, king of Sweden and Norway (died 18 September 1872)
- 5 June - Ivar Hallström, composer (died 1901)
- 19 July - Elsa Borg, educator and social worker (died 1909)
- 26 August – Johan Fredrik Höckert, artist (died 1866)
- 2 September – Augusta Dorothea Eklund, street peddler and eccentric (died 1895)
- 16 October - Mathilda Ebeling, soprano (died 1851)
- 11 November – Elise Arnberg, miniaturist and photographer (died 1891)
- Wilhelmina Lagerholm, photographer (died 1917)

== Deaths ==
- 14 March – Julie Alix de la Fay ballerina (born 1746)
- 6 May - Sophie Hagman, ballerina and royal mistress (born 1758)
- 19 June - Elsa Fougt, chief editor (born 1754)
- 17 November – Caroline Müller, opera singer (born 1755)
- - Caroline Lewenhaupt, courtier and writer (born 1754)
- - Maria Aurora Uggla, royal favorite (born 1747)
