= 1754 in Sweden =

- Years in Sweden: 1751 1752 1753 1754 1755 1756 1757
- Centuries: 17th century · 18th century · 19th century
- Decades: 1720s 1730s 1740s 1750s 1760s 1770s 1780s
- Years: 1751 1752 1753 1754 1755 1756 1757

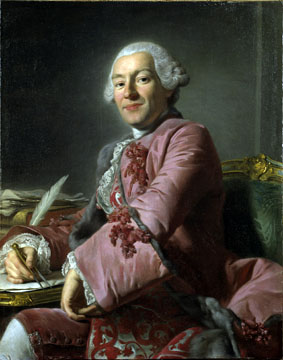
Alexander Roslin's portrait of Carl Fredrik Adelcrantz made during the latter's stay in Paris in 1754 (in the collection of the Royal Swedish Academy of Arts, Stockholm to which it was bequested by Adelcrantz)

Events from the year 1754 in Sweden

== Incumbents ==
- Monarch – Adolf Frederick

== Events ==
- - Foundation of the Stenborg Company, the first known Swedish language theater group to tour Sweden and Finland.
- - The cause célèbre of Risbadstugan.
- - New law on suicide: people who falsely admitted guilt or committed crimes with the intent of committing suicide through execution were to be punished by pillorying and imprisoned rather than executed.

== Births ==
- 29 June - Peter Gustaf Tengmalm, naturalist (died 1803)
- June 18 – Anna Maria Lenngren, writer, poet and social critic (died 1817)
- 28 July - Abraham Niclas Edelcrantz, poet and inventor (died 1821)
- 10 March - Augusta von Fersen courtier, royal mistress and profile of the Gustavian age (died 1846)
- 4 December - Nils Lorens Sjöberg, officer and poet (died 1822)
- - Caroline Lewenhaupt, courtier (died 1826)
- 24 September - Anna Charlotta Schröderheim, salonnière (died 1791)
- - Georg Johan De Besche, royal favorite (died 1814)

== Deaths ==
- Christina Beata Dagström, glassworks owner (born 1691)
