= 1824 in Sweden =

- Years in Sweden: 1821 1822 1823 1824 1825 1826 1827
- Centuries: 18th century · 19th century · 20th century
- Decades: 1790s 1800s 1810s 1820s 1830s 1840s 1850s
- Years: 1821 1822 1823 1824 1825 1826 1827

Events from the year 1824 in Sweden

== Incumbents ==
- Monarch – Charles XIV John

== Events ==
- 2 January - First issue of the conservative Stockholms Dagblad.
- - First issue of Linköpings ASS.
- - Jöns Jacob Berzelius identifies boron.

== Births ==
- 21 January - Bertha Valerius, photographer and painter (died 1895)
- 28 June - Adolf W. Edelsvärd, architect (died 1919)
- 25 November- Amalia Eriksson, inventor of the polkagris, (died 1923)
- 27 December – Charlotta Norberg, ballerina (died 1892)

== Deaths ==
- 28 June - Hans Henric von Essen, politician and courtier (born 1755)
- 20 November - Carl Axel Arrhenius, chemist (born 1757)
