= Christian Workers Union of Sweden =

Christian Workers Union of Sweden may refer to:

- Christian Workers Union of Sweden (1898)
- Christian Workers Union of Sweden (1899)
