= 1898 in Sweden =

- Decades: 1870s; 1880s; 1890s; 1900s; 1910s
- See also: Other events of 1898; Timeline of Swedish history

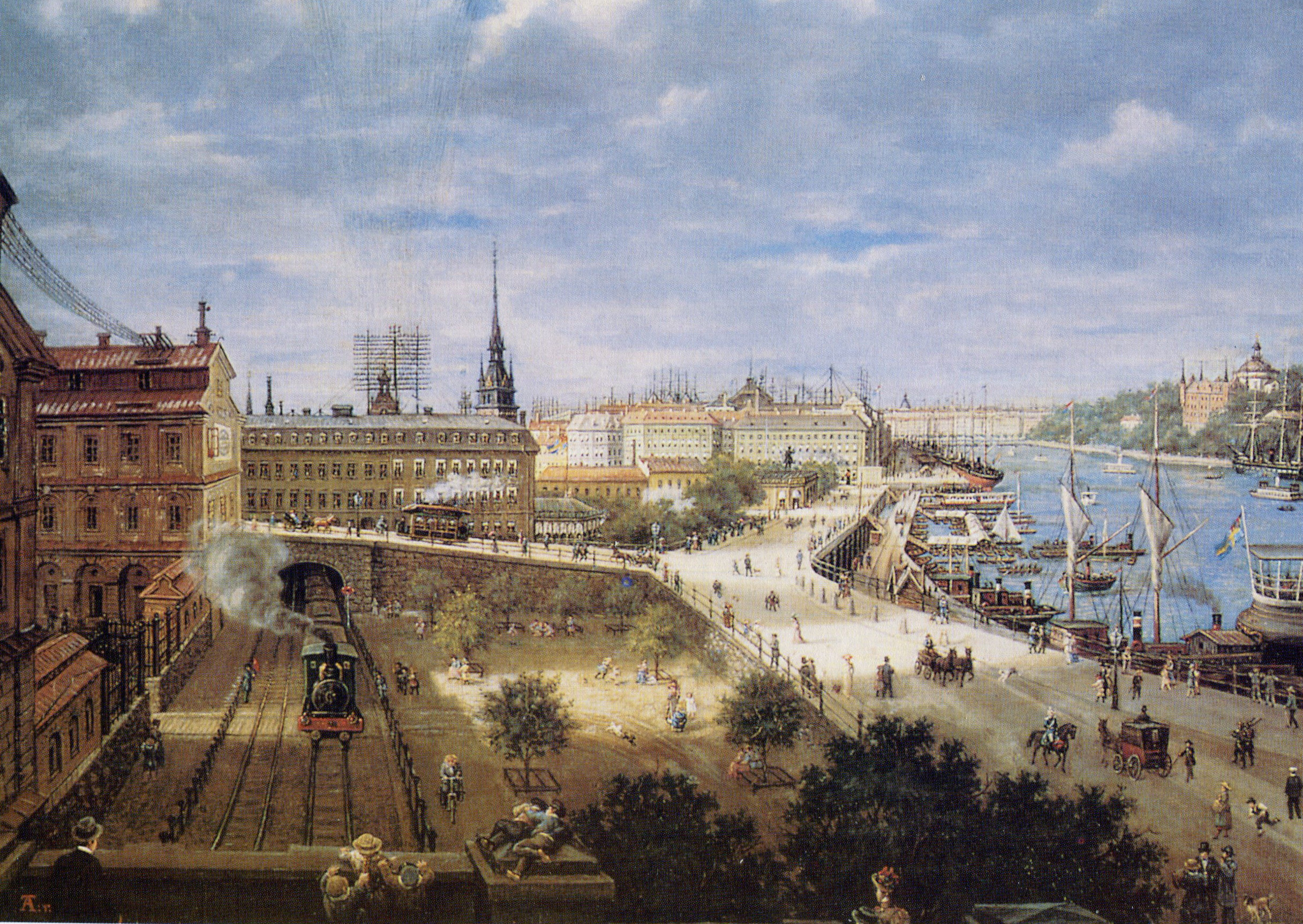
Utsikt över Slussen Tholander 1898

Events from the year 1898 in Sweden

== Incumbents ==
- Monarch – Oscar II
- Prime Minister – Erik Gustaf Boström

== Events ==
- 7 August - Swedish Trade Union Confederation (LO) is founded
  - Replaced the Social Democratic Labor Party (SAP) acting as the trade union movement's central organization
- Brand (magazine)
- Sollefteå GIF
- Team ThorenGruppen Fotboll
- IFK Västerås
- Christian Workers Union of Sweden (1898) founded
- internal combustion engine built for Vabis
- production of Swedish Mauser commenced
- 'third veto' marked a stage of Norway's withdrawal of use of union mark in its flags
- construction of Tjolöholm Castle commenced
- Princess Margaret of Connaught confirmed in Windsor Castle
- founding of Soltorgsgymnasiet gymnasium (school)
- Högby Lighthouse first constructed
- First Swedish military aircraft entered service
- Sollefteå GIF association football club founded
- Tegs SK (ice hockey) founded
- Orrefors glassworks founded

== Births ==
- 15 January - Erik Byléhn, athlete (died 1986)
- 22 January - Thor Modéen, actor (died 1950)
- 28 January - Erik Abrahamsson, athlete (died 1965)
- 24 February - Baltzar von Platen, inventor (died 1984)
- 19 April - Eric Persson, football manager (died 1984)
- 30 April - Johan Richthoff, wrestler (died 1983)
- 16 May - Nils Swedlund, soldier (died 1965)
- 29 June - Bertil Jansson, athlete (died 1981)
- 6 July - Richard Åkerman, soldier (died 1981)
- 10 July - Renée Björling, actor (died 1975)
- 23 July - Bengt Djurberg, actor (died 1941)
- 16 August - Gregor Adlercreutz, equestrian (died 1944)
- 20 August - Vilhelm Moberg, man of letters (died 1973)
- 4 November - Nils Engdahl, athlete (died 1983)
- 9 December - Astri Taube, artist (died 1980)
- 11 December - Nils Ferlin, poet (died 1961)
- 28 December - Carl-Gustaf Rossby, meteorologist (1957)

== Deaths ==
- 10 December - Emil Kléen, poet (born 1868)
- 8 December Ellen Anckarsvärd, women's right activist (born 1833)
- 4 July – Rosalie Roos, women's right activist and writer (born 1823)
