= 1757 in Sweden =

- Years in Sweden: 1754 1755 1756 1757 1758 1759 1760
- Centuries: 17th century · 18th century · 19th century
- Decades: 1720s 1730s 1740s 1750s 1760s 1770s 1780s
- Years: 1754 1755 1756 1757 1758 1759 1760

Events from the year 1757 in Sweden

== Incumbents ==
- Monarch – Adolf Frederick

== Events ==
- May - Sweden form an alliance with France and Austria against Prussia.
- 13 September - Sweden joins the Seven Years' War through the Pomeranian War.
- - A regulation is formed for the ongoing agricultural land reform Storskiftet.
- - People with epilepsy are banned from marrying.
- - Blockade of Stralsund
- - Gustav Badin is presented as a gift to the Queen.

== Births ==
- 16 March - Bengt Lidner, poet (died 1793)
- 29 March - Carl Axel Arrhenius, chemist (died 1824)
- 30 March - Sophie Piper, courtier (died 1816)
- 31 March - Gustaf Mauritz Armfelt, royal favorite (died 1814)
- 14 July - Anders Fredrik Skjöldebrand, minister and general (died 1834)
- 27 September – Henric Schartau, pietist (died 1825)
- 10 October - Erik Acharius, botanist (died 1819)
- Christina Fris, industrialist (died 1835)

== Deaths ==
- Erland Broman, royal favorite (born 1704)
- Rika Maja, Sami shaman (born 1661)
