= 1807 in Sweden =

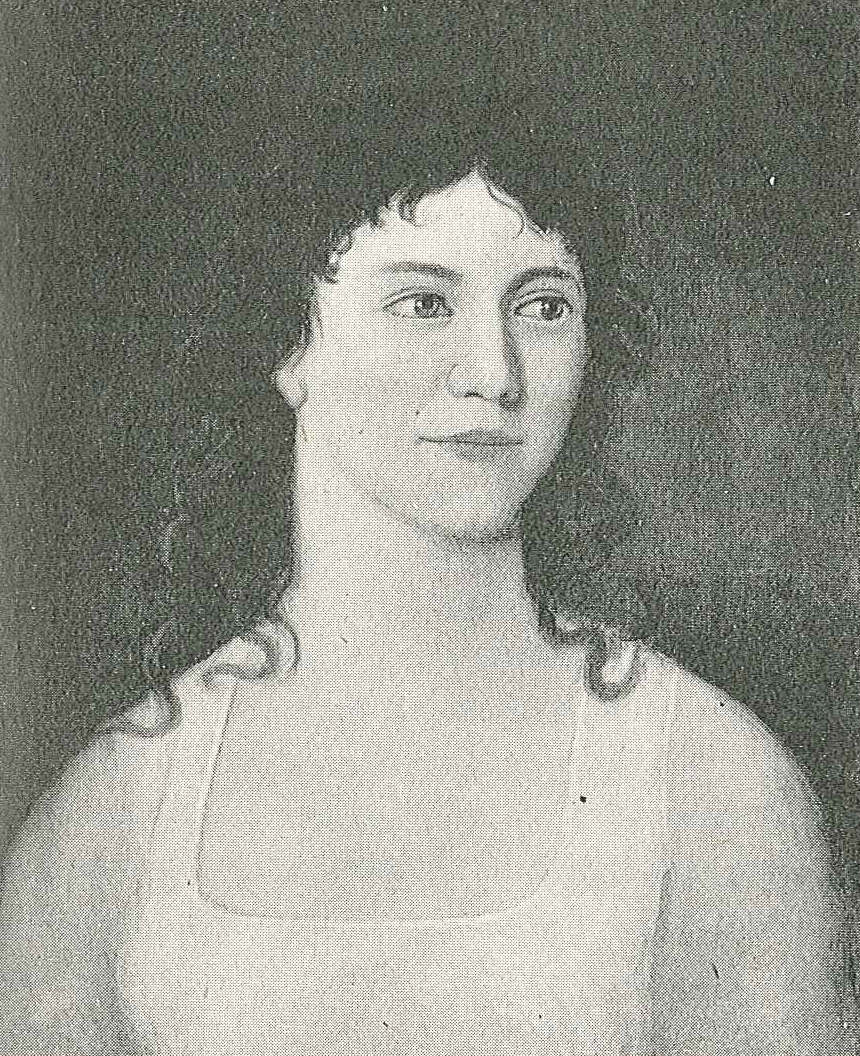
Myhrman, Anna

Events from the year 1807 in Sweden

== Incumbents ==
- Monarch – Gustav IV Adolf

== Events ==
- January - French occupation of Swedish Pomerania.
- - The first Steam engine in Sweden is constructed by Samuel Owen.
- - The land reform Enskiftet is enforced in all Sweden (with Finland), which signified the end of traditional village life.
- - A reform allows anyone to establish themselves as bakers without a membership in the bakery guild with a permit form the authorities.

== Births ==
- 7 February – Charlotta Deland, stage actress (died 1864)
- 14 May – Charlotta Djurström, actress and theater manager (died 1877)
- 22 June - Princess Cecilia of Sweden (1807–1844), princess (died 1844)
- 8 August – Emilie Flygare-Carlén, writer (died 1892)
- Sophie Bolander, writer (died 1869)
- Anna Christina Cronquist, entrepreneur and weaver (died 1893)

== Deaths ==
- - Anna Sophia Holmstedt, ballerina (born 1759)
