= 1897 in Sweden =

- Decades: 1870s; 1880s; 1890s; 1900s; 1910s
- See also: Other events of 1897; Timeline of Swedish history

Events from the year 1897 in Sweden

== Incumbents ==
- Monarch – Oscar II
- Prime Minister – Erik Gustaf Boström.

== Events ==
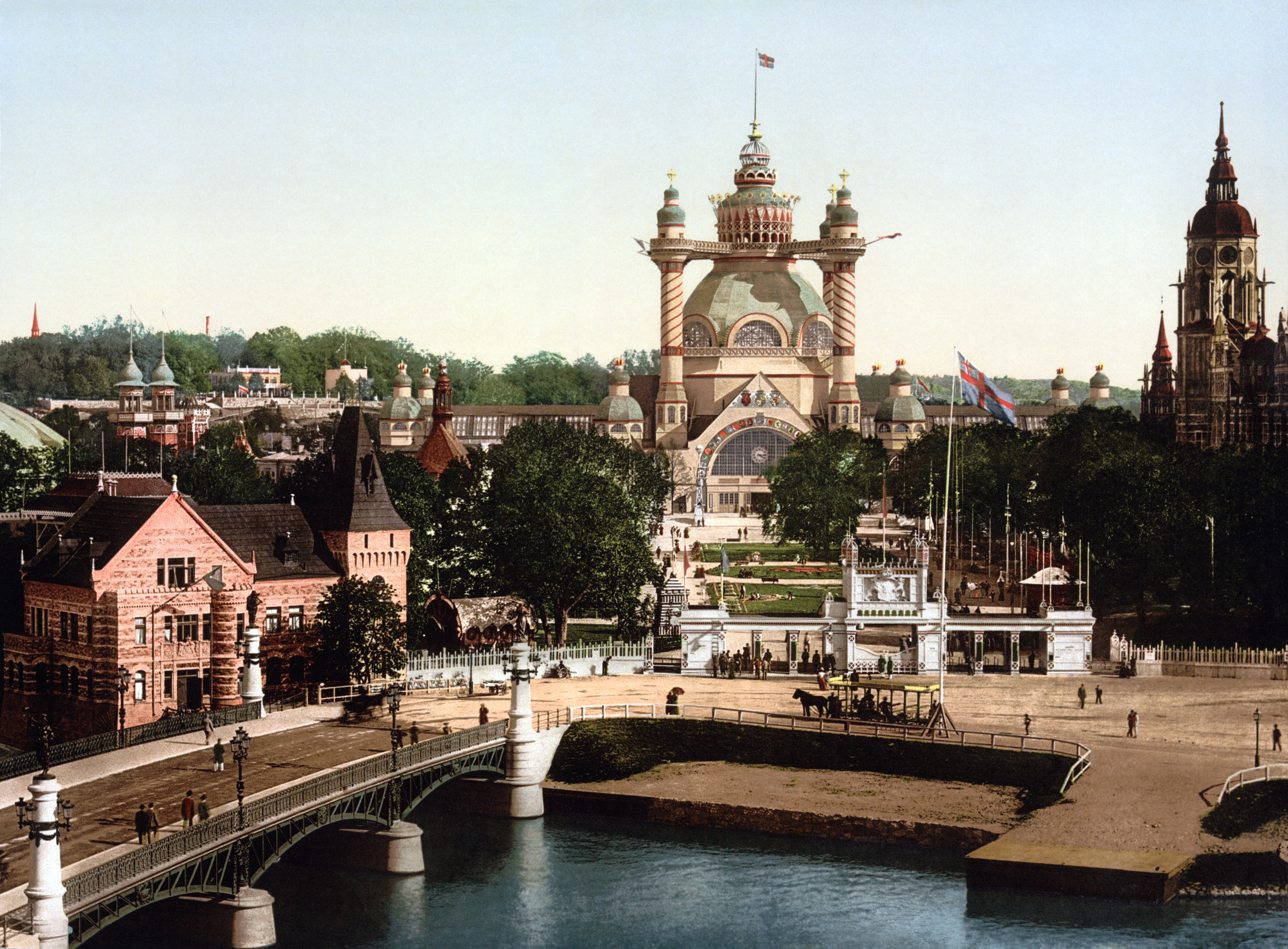
From the 1897 exhibition in Stockholm.

- The General Art and Industrial Exposition of Stockholm
- The Swedish Transport Workers' Union was founded.
- Sturehof is opened.
- Elsa Eschelsson become the first female with a Doctor of Laws in Sweden.
- Märtha Leth becomes the first formally educated and licensed female pharmacist in Sweden.

== Sport ==
- IFK Eskilstuna founded
- Göteborgs FF founded
- Hammarby IF Bandy founded
- IFK Norrköping founded

== Births ==
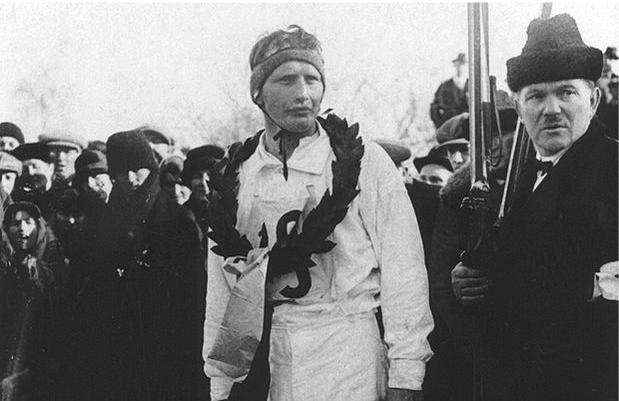
Per-Erik Hedlund, Olympic champion in 50 km in 1928.

- 22 March – Carl Munters, inventor (died 1989)
- 30 March – Martin Hindorff, sailor (died 1969).
- 18 April – Per-Erik Hedlund, cross country skier (died 1975).
- 5 July – Åke Häger, gymnast (died 1968).
- 17 August – Erik Charpentier, gymnast (died 1978).

== Deaths ==
- 30 January – Robert Themptander, prime minister (born 1844)
- 12 September - Fredrika Limnell, salonnière, philanthropist, women's rights activist (born 1816)
- 14 December - Edvard Swartz, stage actor (born 1826)
