= 1891 in Sweden =

- Decades: 1870s; 1880s; 1890s; 1900s; 1910s
- See also: Other events of 1891; Timeline of Swedish history

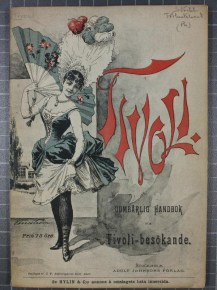
Handbok Stockholms Tivoli 1891

Events from 1891 in Sweden

== Incumbents ==
- Monarch – Oscar II
- Prime Minister – Gustaf Åkerhielm, Erik Gustaf Boström.

== Events ==
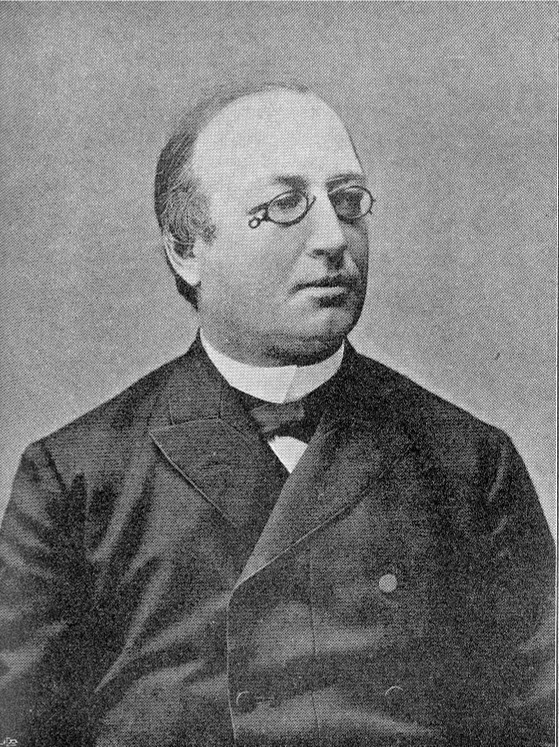
Erik Gustaf Boström assumed the position of Prime Minister.

- 15 February – Allmänna Idrottsklubben (AIK) (Swedish Sports Club) is founded.
- 12 March – Djurgårdens IF (DIF) (Swedish Sports Club) is founded.
- 10 July – Erik Gustaf Boström becomes Prime Minister
- Göteborgs högskola established
- AIK Bandy
- Djurgårdens IF Bandy
- Johan Petter Johansson patents the ‘Swedish key’ (adjustable spanner)
- Skansen
- Swedish Saw Mill Industry Workers Union
- Under röd flagg
- Ursholmen

== Births ==
- 25 April – John Gustaf Axel Berg, designer (died 1971)
- 23 May – Pär Lagerkvist, writer, Nobel Prize laureate (died 1974)
- 1 July – Sten Selander, botanist and fiction writer (died 1957).
- 2 July – Karin Kock-Lindberg, politician (died 1976)
- 3 September – Curt Hartzell, gymnast (died 1975).
- 13 October – Helge Bäckander, gymnast (died 1958).
- 28 November – Gustaf Dyrssen, military officer (died 1981).

== Deaths ==
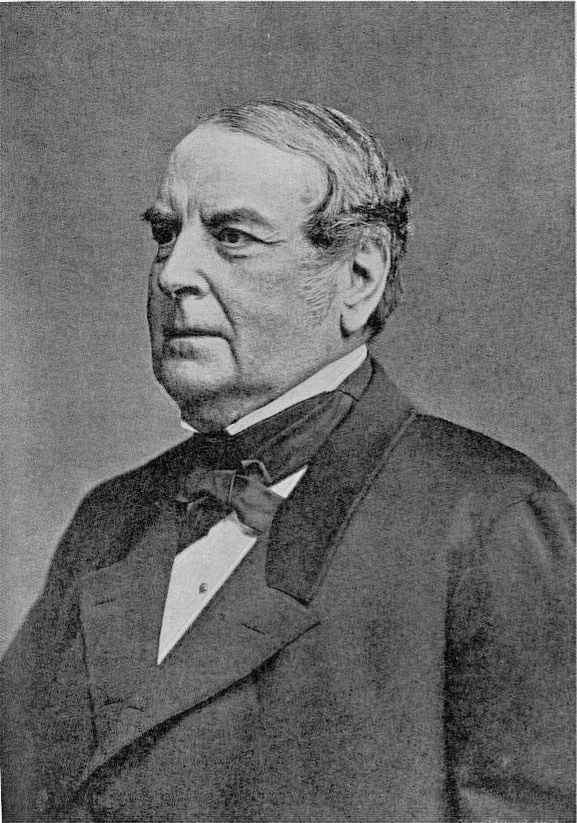
Carl Johan Thyselius, Prime Minister 1883–84.

- 11 January Carl Johan Thyselius politician (born 1811)
- 6 September – Elise Arnberg, miniaturist and photographer (born 1826)
