= 1893 in Sweden =

- Decades: 1870s; 1880s; 1890s; 1900s; 1910s
- See also: Other events of 1893; Timeline of Swedish history

Events from the year 1893 in Sweden

== Incumbents ==
- Monarch – Oscar II
- Prime Minister – Erik Gustaf Boström.

== Events ==
- Inauguration of the Grand Hotel Saltsjöbaden.
- 19 April - Sundbybergs IK is formed.
- 3 December: The Church of Sweden Oscar Fredrik Church is inaugurated on First Advent Sunday.

== Births ==
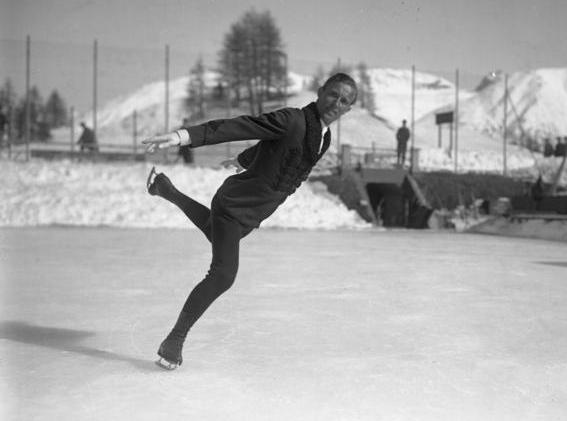
Gillis Grafström Olympic champion in figure skating in 1920, 1924 and 1928, and world champion in 1922, 1924 and 1929.

- 23 January – Sven-Olof Jonsson, gymnast (died 1945).
- 24 January – Erik Friborg, cyclist (died 1968).
- 7 June – Gillis Grafström, figure skater (died 1938).
- 23 July – Gerda Höjer, nurse and politician (died 1974)
- 21 October – Fabian Biörck, gymnast (died 1977).

== Deaths ==
- 4 December - Maria Westberg, ballerina (born 1853)
- Anna Christina Cronquist, entrepreneur and weaver (born 1807)
