= 1833 in Sweden =

- Years in Sweden: 1830 1831 1832 1833 1834 1835 1836
- Centuries: 18th century · 19th century · 20th century
- Decades: 1800s 1810s 1820s 1830s 1840s 1850s 1860s
- Years: 1830 1831 1832 1833 1834 1835 1836

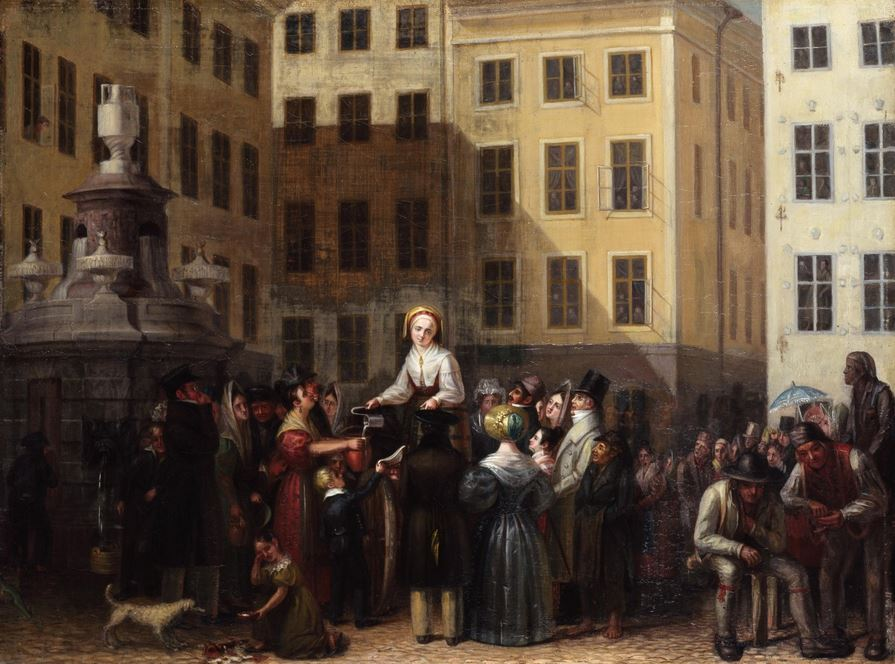
Pilt Carin Ersdotter.

Events from the year 1833 in Sweden

== Incumbents ==
- Monarch – Charles XIV John

== Events ==
- Pilt Carin Ersdotter arrives to Stockholm where she attracts great attention as The beautiful Dalarna girl.
- Törnrosens bok by Carl Jonas Love Almqvist

== Births ==
- 21 March - Carl Stål, entomologist specialising in Hemiptera (died 1878)
- 11 April - Fredrik von Otter, Prime Minister (died 1910)
- 24 July - Gustaf Åkerhielm, Prime Minister (died 1900)
- 21 October - Alfred Nobel, chemist, engineer, innovator, and armaments manufacturer (died 1896)
- 10 December - Ellen Anckarsvärd, women's rights activist (died 1898)
- Rosalie Sjöman, photographer (died 1919)

== Deaths ==
- 28 May - Johann Christian Friedrich Hæffner, composer (born 1759)
- 1 June - Rudolf Cederström, naval commander (born 1764)
- 24 July - Hedda Wrangel, composer (born 1792)
- Johan Anton Lindqvist, theatre director (born 1759)
