= Nils Sjöberg =

Nils Sjöberg may refer to:

- Nils Lorens Sjöberg (1754–1822), Swedish officer and poet
- Nils Sjöberg, a pseudonym used by American singer-songwriter Taylor Swift.
