= Vattenfall i Småland =

1856 painting by Marcus Larson

- Waterfall in Småland (English)
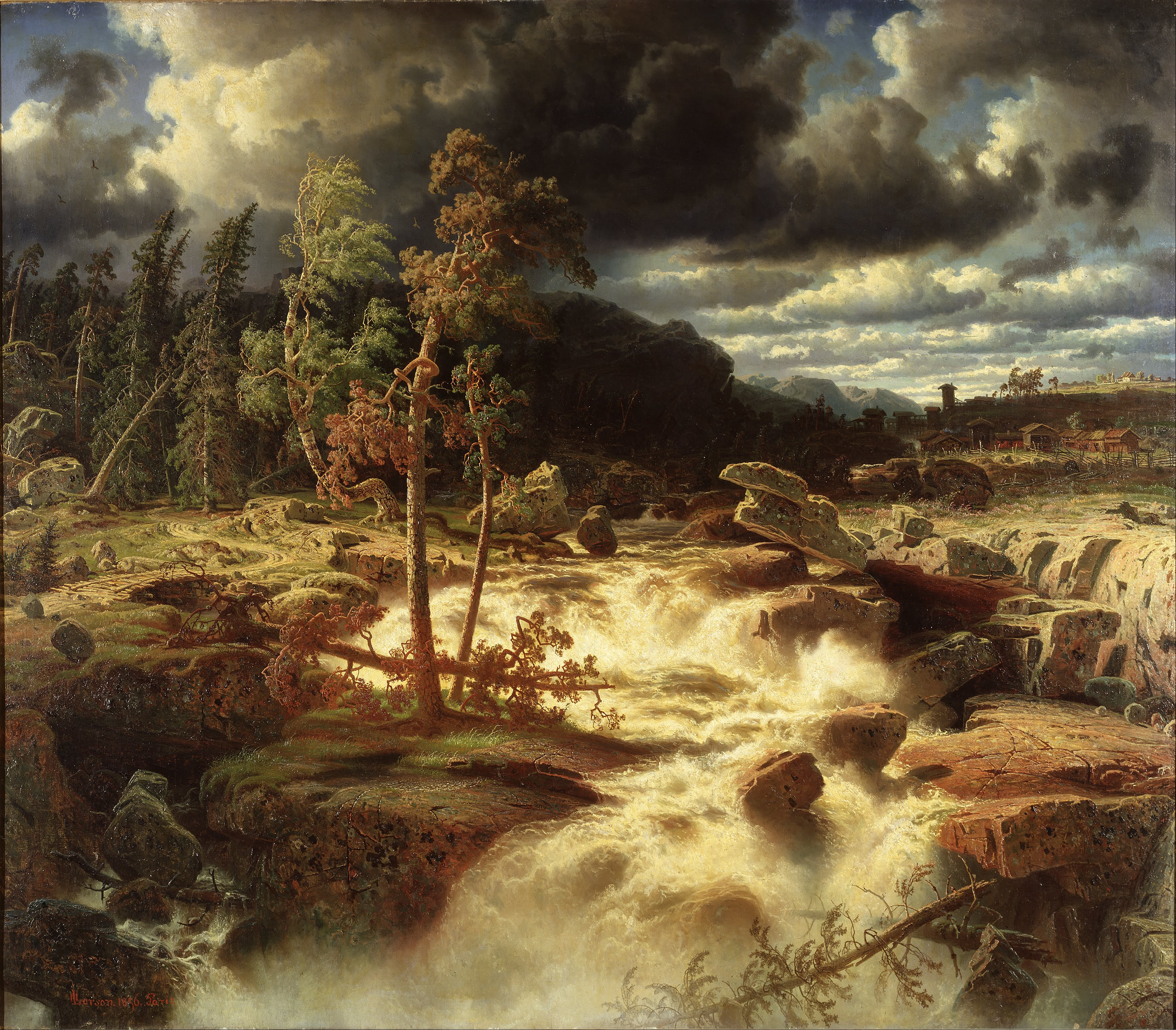
- Artist: Marcus Larson
- Year: 1856
- Medium: Oil on canvas
- Location: Nationalmuseum, Stockholm

Vattenfall i Småland (English:Waterfall in Småland) is a 19th-century oil painting by Swedish painter Marcus Larson. Painted in 1856, it has been characterized as a typical example of the Düsseldorf school of painting.
