= 1901 in Sweden =

- Decades: 1880s; 1890s; 1900s; 1910s; 1920s
- See also: Other events of 1901; Timeline of Swedish history

Events from the year 1901 in Sweden

== Incumbents ==
- Monarch – Oscar II
- Prime Minister – Fredrik von Otter

== Events ==
- 9–17 February – The first Nordic Games take place in Stockholm.
- A military reform abolish the Allotment system with conscription.
- Women are given four weeks maternity leave.
- Foundation of the Swedish Union of Journalists.
- A name ordinance is put in legal effect, regulating the uses of first names, surnames and family names.

== Popular culture ==
=== Theatre ===
- Easter (Swedish: Påsk), play by August Strindberg.
- A Dream Play by August Strindberg.

== Births ==
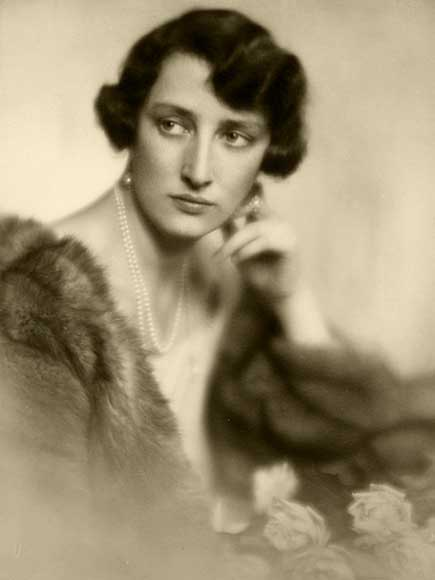
Princess Märtha.

- February 23 – Ivar Lo-Johansson, writer (died 1990)
- 28 March – Princess Märtha of Sweden (died 1954)
- 13 June – Tage Erlander, politician (died 1985)
- 18 August – Arne Borg, swimmer (died 1979)
- 13 October – Irja Agnes Browallius, writer (died 1968)
- 20 October – Gustav Åkerman, army officer (died 1988)

== Deaths ==
- 11 April – Ivar Hallström, composer (born 1826)
- 24 April – Arvid Posse, prime minister (born 1828)
- 5 May – Axel Wilhelm Eriksson, Swedish settler and trader in South-West Africa (born 1846)
- 12 August – Adolf Erik Nordenskiöld, baron, botanist, geologist, mineralogist and arctic explorer (born 1832)
- 24 August – Gunnar Wennerberg, composer (born 1817)
- 10 September - Emanuella Carlbeck, social reformer (born 1829)
- - Hilda Caselli, educational reformer (born 1836)
- - Axel Elmlund, ballet dancer and stage actor (born 1838)
