= 1759 in Sweden =

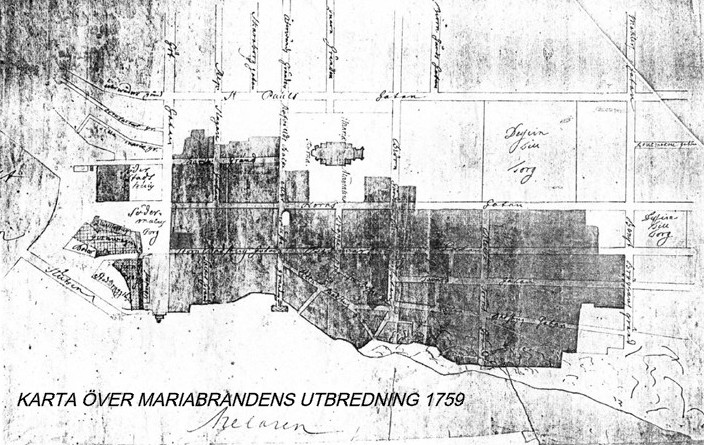
A map of the Great Stockholm Fire 1759. (North is downwards. The fire started near the sea Mälaren at the bottom of the map.)

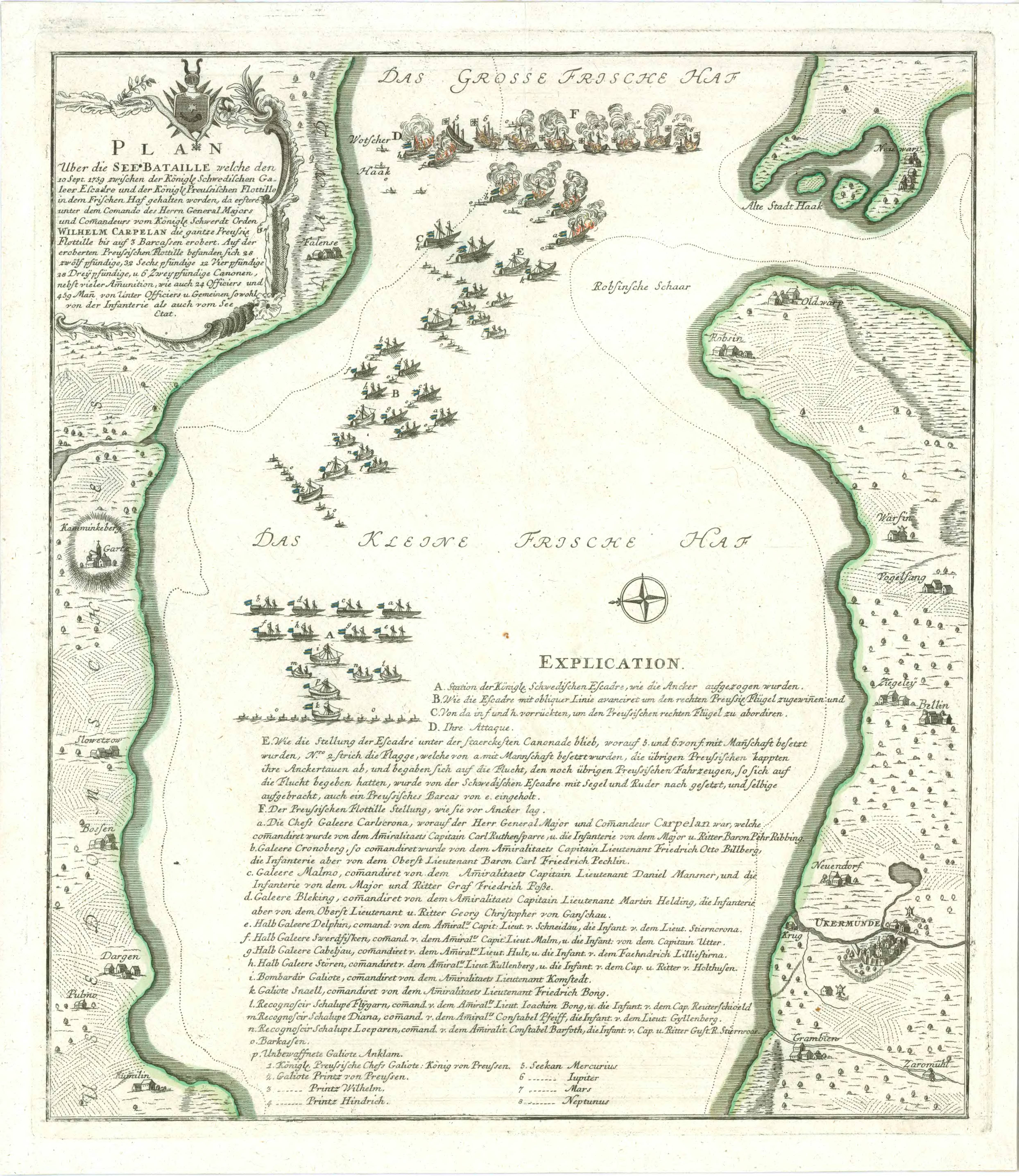
Stettiner Haff - Battle of 1759

Events from the year 1759 in Sweden

== Incumbents ==
- Monarch – Adolf Frederick

== Events ==
- 10 September - Battle of Frisches Haff
- 19 July - The Great Stockholm Fire 1759 reduced about 20 blocks with about 300 houses to ash, and rendered about 2000 persons homeless.
- - The Royal Swedish Society of Sciences and Letters is founded.
- - Vinterkväde by Gustaf Fredrik Gyllenborg

== Births ==
- 1 March - Carl Pontus Gahn, Swedish military officer (died 1825)
- 2 March - Johann Christian Friedrich Haeffner, composer (died 1833)
- 23 March - Anders Ljungstedt, historian (died 1835)
- 18 April – Thomas Thorild, poet, critic and philosopher (died 1808)
- 16 August – Carl Fredric von Breda, painter (died 1818)
- – Anna Sophia Holmstedt, ballerina (died 1807)
- - Charlotte Eckerman, opera singer and courtesan (died 1790)
- Johan Anton Lindqvist, theatre director (died 1833)

== Deaths ==
- 20 June – Margareta Capsia, painter (born 1682)
