= 1900 in Sweden =

- Decades: 1880s; 1890s; 1900s; 1910s; 1920s
- See also: Other events of 1900; Timeline of Swedish history

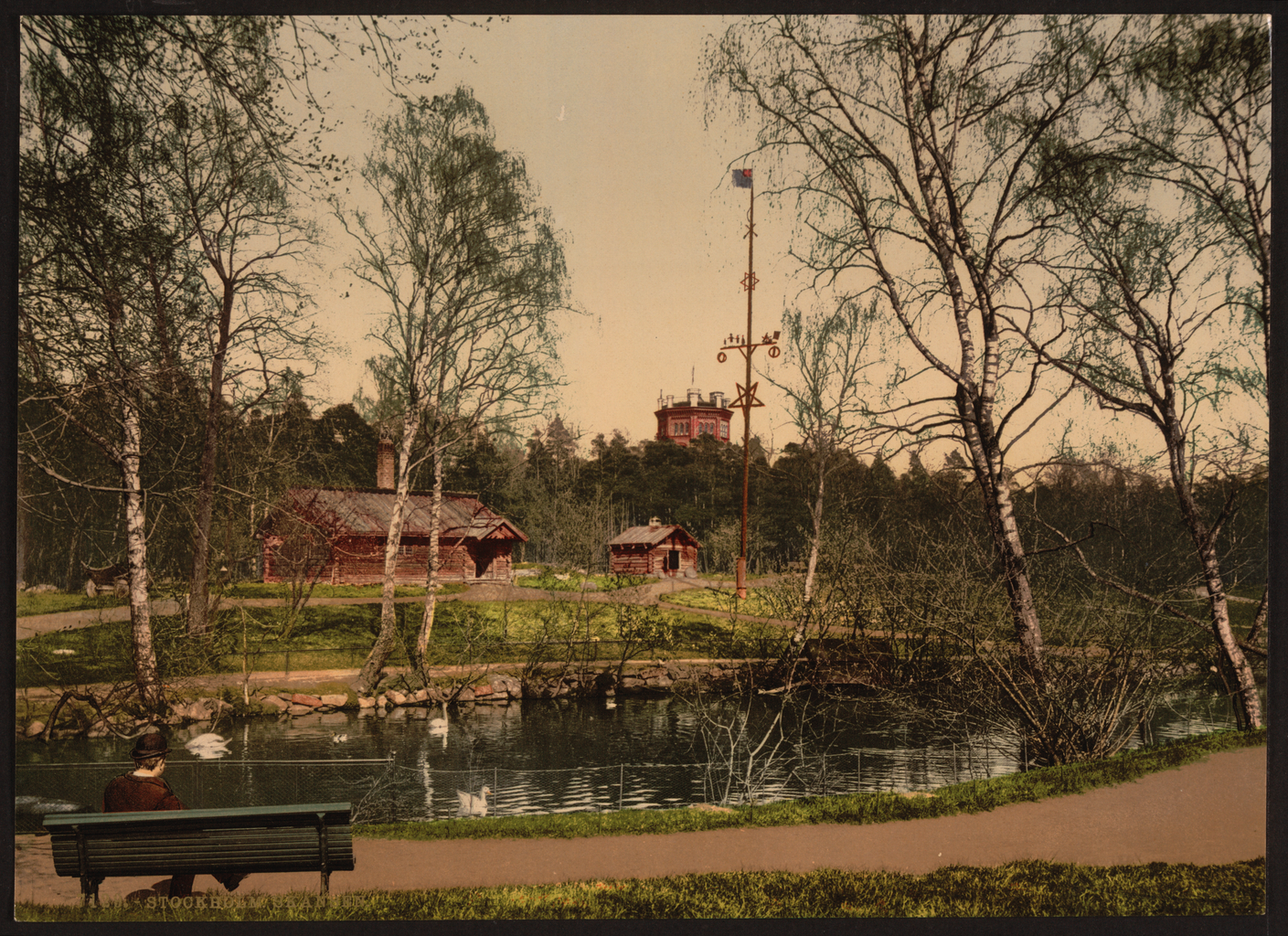
Skansen, Stockholm, Sweden

Events from the year 1900 in Sweden

== Incumbents ==
- Monarch – Oscar II
- Prime Minister – Erik Gustaf Boström, Fredrik von Otter

== Events ==
- 27 April – The city plan for Kiruna, Sweden is adopted.
- Date unknown – The newspaper Västerbottens-Kuriren is established.
- Date unknown – Maternity leave for female industrial workers.
- Date unknown – The Swedish branch of the Woman's Christian Temperance Union is organized by Emilie Rathou.
- Date unknown – The Malmö Women's Discussion Club, is founded by Elma Danielsson in Malmö.

== Births ==
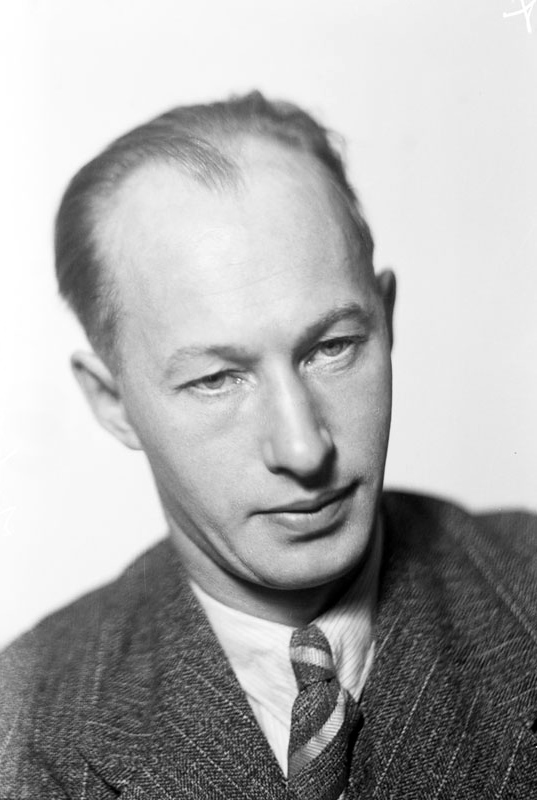
Eyvind Johnson, Nobel laureate 1974.

- 16 January – Helge Gustafsson, gymnast (died 1981).
- 26 May – Karin Juel, singer, actor and writer (died 1976)
- 29 July – Eyvind Johnson, writer (died 1976)
- 29 August – Åke Bergqvist, sailor (died 1975).
- 26 October – Karin Boye, poet and novelist (died 1941)
- 30 October – Ragnar Granit, physiologist (died 1991)
- 29 November - Håkan Malmrot, swimmer (died 1987)

== Deaths ==
- 2 April – Gustaf Åkerhielm, prime minister (born 1833)
- 21 July - Aurore Storckenfeldt, reform pedagogue (born 1816)
- 10 December – Betty Linderoth, watchmaker (born 1822)
- 31 December – Oscar Alin, historian and politician (born 1846)
