= Maria Westberg =

Swedish ballerina

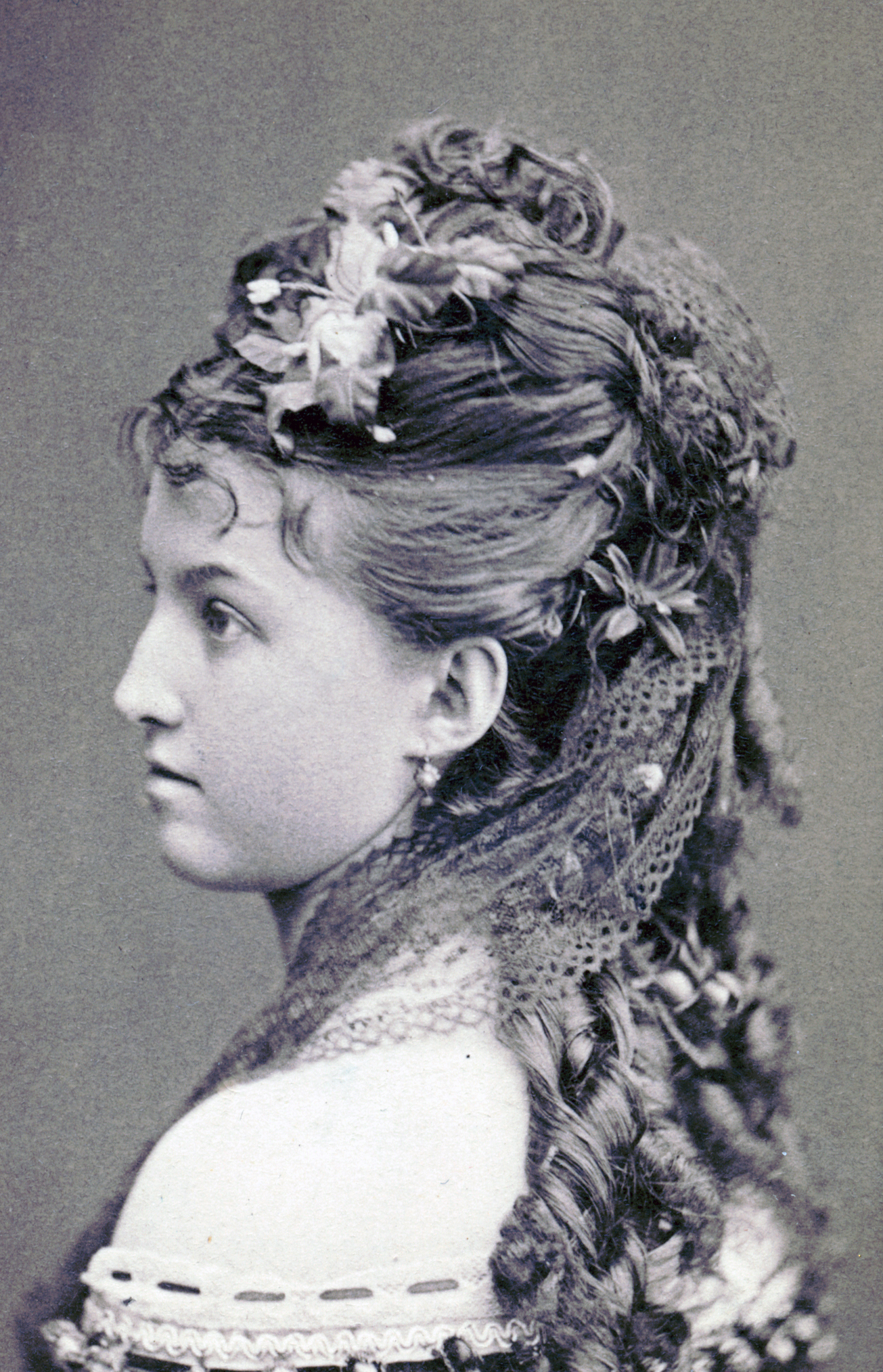
Maria Westberg

Maria Charlotta Westberg (3 February 1853 – 4 December 1893), was a Swedish ballerina.

Westberg was born in Stockholm to the lithographer Peter Magnus Westberg and Hedvig Maria Lönnqvist.

She was a student dancer of the Royal Swedish Ballet in 1860, a premier student dancer in 1867, and a second dancer in 1870-1872. She was engaged at the Royal Danish Ballet in 1872-1890, where she enjoyed a successful career as a Premier solo dancer in 1875-1890.

Westberg was engaged at the Royal Danish Ballet on request of August Bournonville. Bournonville was searching for someone who could be able to replace his retiring primadonna Betty Schnell, and noticed Westberg during his guest performance at Royal Swedish Ballet in Sweden in 1871.

Maria Westberg was a star of the Royal Danish Ballet during the 1870s and 1880s, when she performed the female main part of a number of ballet performances. She made a successful debut as a guest dancer in Copenhagen in the title role of «Sylfiden» 6 September 1871. On 1 July 1875, she was made solo dancer and from this point on performed almost all female main parts in the ballet performances of the Royal Danish Ballet and had "in practice a position as a primadonna". Among her parts were Astrid in «Valdemar», Svava in «Valkyrjen», Hilda in «Et Folkesagn», Kirsti in «Brudefærden i Hardanger», Nathalie in «Fra Sibirien til Moskov», Teresina in «Napoli», Rosita in «Fjærnt fra Danmark», Celeste in «Toreadoren» and the title role of «Aditi».

She was described:

"In lack of mimic talent, Miss W. made herself noted on stage by her slender figure, her pure look and her blonde beauty; she had her own rare femininity, which displayed more of the correctness of a Lady than the passion of the Nordic Maiden, and too cold to suit the roles of Southern heroines or courtesans."

She suffered from a weak health, which became worse due to her physical work as a dancer. She retired from her career after performing the part of Svava in Richard Wagner's Valkyrie and as Nathalie in August Bournonville's Fra Sibirien til Moskov.

After her retirement she settled in her native city of Stockholm, where she died.
