= Pilt Carin Ersdotter =

Swedish milk maid

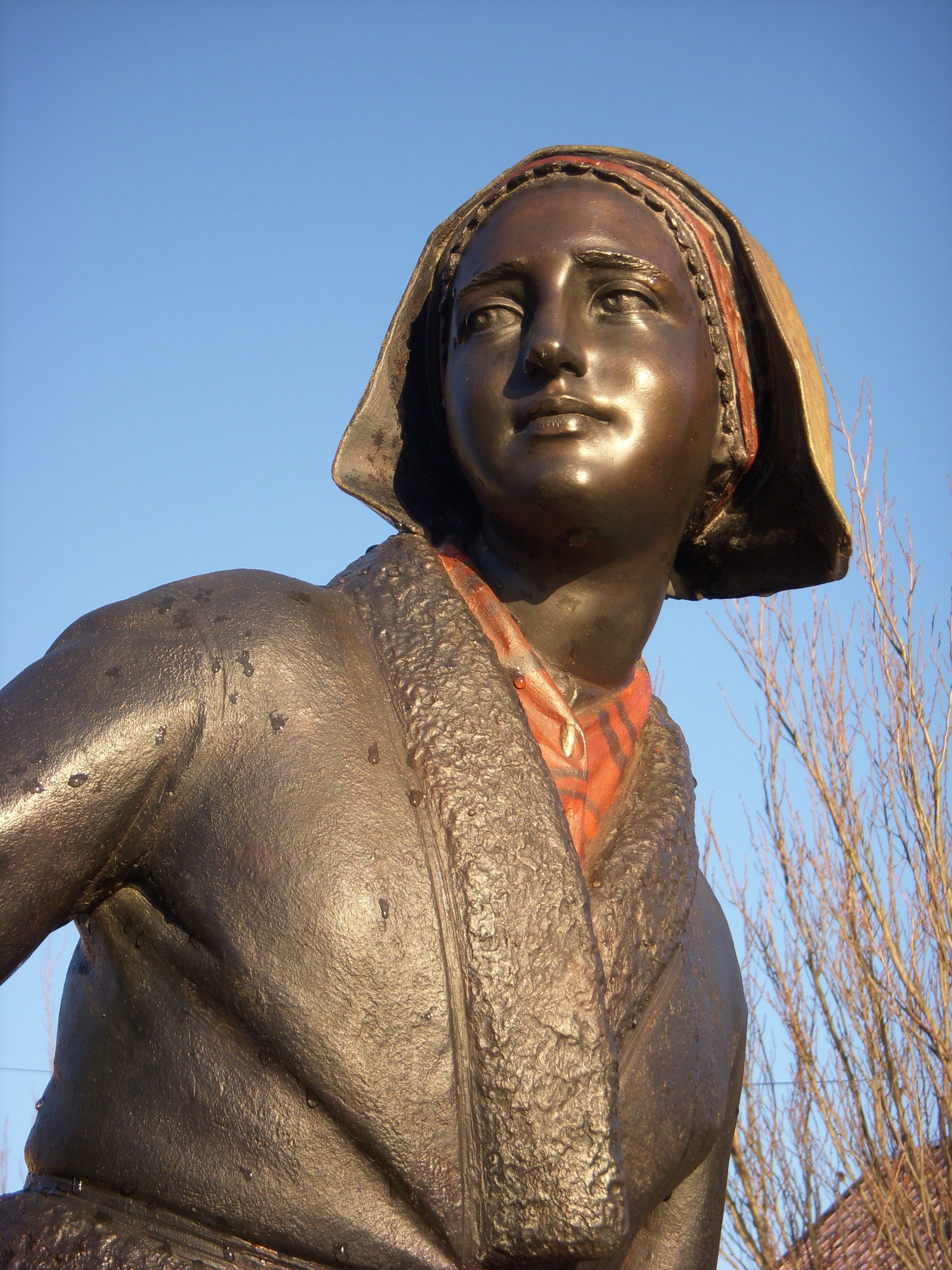
Pilt Carin Ersdotter as a statue: "Pilt-Carin" by Peter Linde at Järla Sjö, Nacka

Pilt Carin Ersdotter (1814–1885), was a Swedish milkmaid from Djura in Dalarna who became famous for her beauty. She sold milk on the street of Stockholm in 1833-1834, and attracted so much attention that she became a mascot to be displayed in the salons of the aristocracy for money. Being a girl from Dalarna, she was called "dalkulla" (girl from Dalarna) and known as "Vackra dalkullan" (The beautiful Dalarna girl).

== Life ==
Pilt Carin Ersdotter is described as small and with a fragile build, but there are many different images of her. She is described as extraordinarily beautiful. During the mid 19th century, it was customary for girls from Dalarna to work as season workers in the capital Stockholm, and Carin was one of these girls when she arrived to the capital in 1833. Normally, these girls worked by managing the traffic in the Stockholm archipelago by rowing boats, thereby acting as paid competitors to the independent rower women. Carin, however, was judged to be too weak for this task, and she was instead hired to deliver milk from Järla gård in Nacka and sell it on the square of Stortorget. She attracted more and more attention on the square, and people are said to have gathered merely to look at her. Once, the Crown Prince came to see her incognito and finally told her: "Well, I suppose I should buy some milk from you", upon which she answered: "Well, where would he like the milk..? In his hat?" When later asked about this meeting, she only replied: "Well I didn't know he was the prince".

At one point, when an unusually large crowd had gathered, she escaped attention by fleeing to one of the houses facing the square, and was thereafter arrested for traffic violation by having created obstacles for the town's traffic and "blocked the street with her beauty". She was, however, released, according to the paper Aftonbladet: "Carin was found innocent and allowed to return to her milk bottles - be it said to reassure the beautiful - as although there is said that some should be fined for being ugly, no one should be denied the right to be as beautiful as possible" (22 November 1833).

After this incident, it became fashionable in aristocratic circles to put Pilt Carin Ersdotter on display: "everyone who made the smallest presumption to be counted among the fashionable circles must, at least one evening, invite people to see the beautiful dalkulla." She was displayed for money in homes belonging to the merchant aristocracy as well as the circles of the royal court and members of the royal family, accompanied by another dalkulla. Carin was also mentioned in foreign media and compared to other internationally known beauties, such as the sailor daughter of Liverpool and the beautiful Mariana of Hamburg.

Pilt Carin Ersdotter made a small fortune by this display tour, and after the season was over, she returned to her home in Djura. Before she left, she was called to the King, and escorted to her boat by the parliamentarian representing Dalarna. In her village, however, she was met with contempt, both for displaying herself for the high society, and because most people in her home village thought it more likely that she had made her fortune by prostitution. The fact that Carin brought with her a certificate assuring her good virtue signed by four baronesses, nine countesses, a count, and a governor did not help the matter, and Carin was forced to appeal to her former employer, the owner of Järla gård, Karl von Moliére, a lawyer and official at Svea Hovrätt, for a new certificate. This certificate was accepted by her village, and she was able to marry her fiancé, "Margites Daniel Andersson".

== Sources ==
- Lisbet Scheutz (2001 (2003) nuytgåva). Berömda och glömda stockholmskvinnor: sju stadsvandringar: 155 kvinnoporträtt. Stockholm: MBM. ISBN 91-973725-3-6 Libris 8392583
