= 1825 in Sweden =

Events from the year 1825 in Sweden

== Incumbents ==
- Monarch – Charles XIV John

== Events ==
- 3 February - Swedish Prison and Probation Service is founded.
- 24 November - The Makalös fire.
- - A motion in parliament suggest the abolition of the legal minority of adult unmarried women, but the reform is not given sufficient support. The reform is raised again in 1844, 1850 and 1853, before being finally passed in 1858.
- - The Gustavsberg porcelain is founded.
- - Långholmens spinnhus is closed

== Births ==
- 3 June - Sophie Sager, feminist (died 1902)
- 5 January - Marcus Larson, painter (died 1864)
- 5 January - Jeanette Möller, painter (died 1872)
- 5 February – Ferdinand Fagerlin, painter (died 1907)
- 1 September - Sigrid Sparre, courtier (died 1910)
- 11 September - Peggy Hård, first female office clerk (died 1894)
- 21 September – Mårten Eskil Winge, painter (died 1896)
- 19 October - Jeanette Granberg, playwright, a feminist and a translator (died 1857)

== Deaths ==
- 3 February - Henric Schartau, pietist (born 1757)
- 19 March - Brita Hagberg, soldier (born 1756)
- 9 May - Carl Pontus Gahn, Swedish military officer (born 1759)
- Charlotte Stierneld, courtier (born 1766)
- Adolf Fredrick Påhlman, Colonel (born 1743)
