= Swedish Sailors and Coalers Union =

Trade union in Sweden

Swedish Sailors' and Coalers' Union
- Svenska sjömans- och eldareförbundet
- Split into: Swedish Seamen's Union, Coalers' Union.
- Founded: 1899
- Dissolved: 1914
- Location: Sweden
- Key people: Charles Lindley

The Swedish Sailors and Coalers Union (Swedish: Svenska sjömans- och eldareförbundet) was a trade union in Sweden. It was the first viable maritime union in the country (following a short-lived Seamen and Coalers Trade Union founded in Gothenburg in 1884). Charles Lindley was the main organizer of the union. Its Göteborg branch was founded in 1899.

The union published the monthly magazine Sjöfolkets tidning.

The union was dissolved in 1914 as it was bifurcated into two separate unions, the Sailors Union and the Coalers Union.
