= Marcus Larson =

Swedish painter (1825–1864)

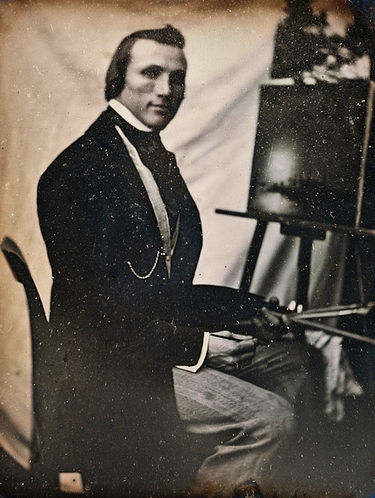
- Daguerreotype photograph of Larson
- Born: Simeon Marcus Larson; 5 January 1825; Åtvidaberg, Sweden
- Died: 25 January 1864 (aged 39); London
- Known for: Landscape painting

Simeon Marcus Larson (5 January 1825 – 25 January 1864) was a Swedish landscape painter from Åtvidaberg, Östergötland. He has been recognized as "one of Sweden's foremost 19th-century painters" and labeled as "the most outstanding of the Swedish Düsseldorf painters." His paintings were known for being dramatic and primarily depicted rivers under violent skies as well as shipwrecks in storms.

== Early career ==
Larson's father was a farm owner but Larson did not inherit any possessions from him when he died and therefore moved to Stockholm to get a job. There he was hired by a saddle maker. This saddle maker saw Larson's talent for drawing and thought it might be of use for carriage sketches and such. Larson was therefore given permission to attend courses at the Royal Swedish Academy of Arts during the evenings.

While at the Academy, Larson discovered his calling for painting and made the decision to start a career dedicated to art. He completed his studies at the school between 1846 and 1848 and then moved to Helsingborg to teach painting. While living there, his painting was largely impacted by the surrounding ocean. During a visit to Copenhagen, Larson got to see the work of Danish marine artist Vilhelm Melbye, who gave lessons to Larson in marine painting. He received further education in the marine genre during the summer of 1850, when he traveled with the corvette Lagerbjelke on an expedition to the North Sea. Afterwards Larson journeyed through Norway to study fells and waterfalls.

== Later career and death ==
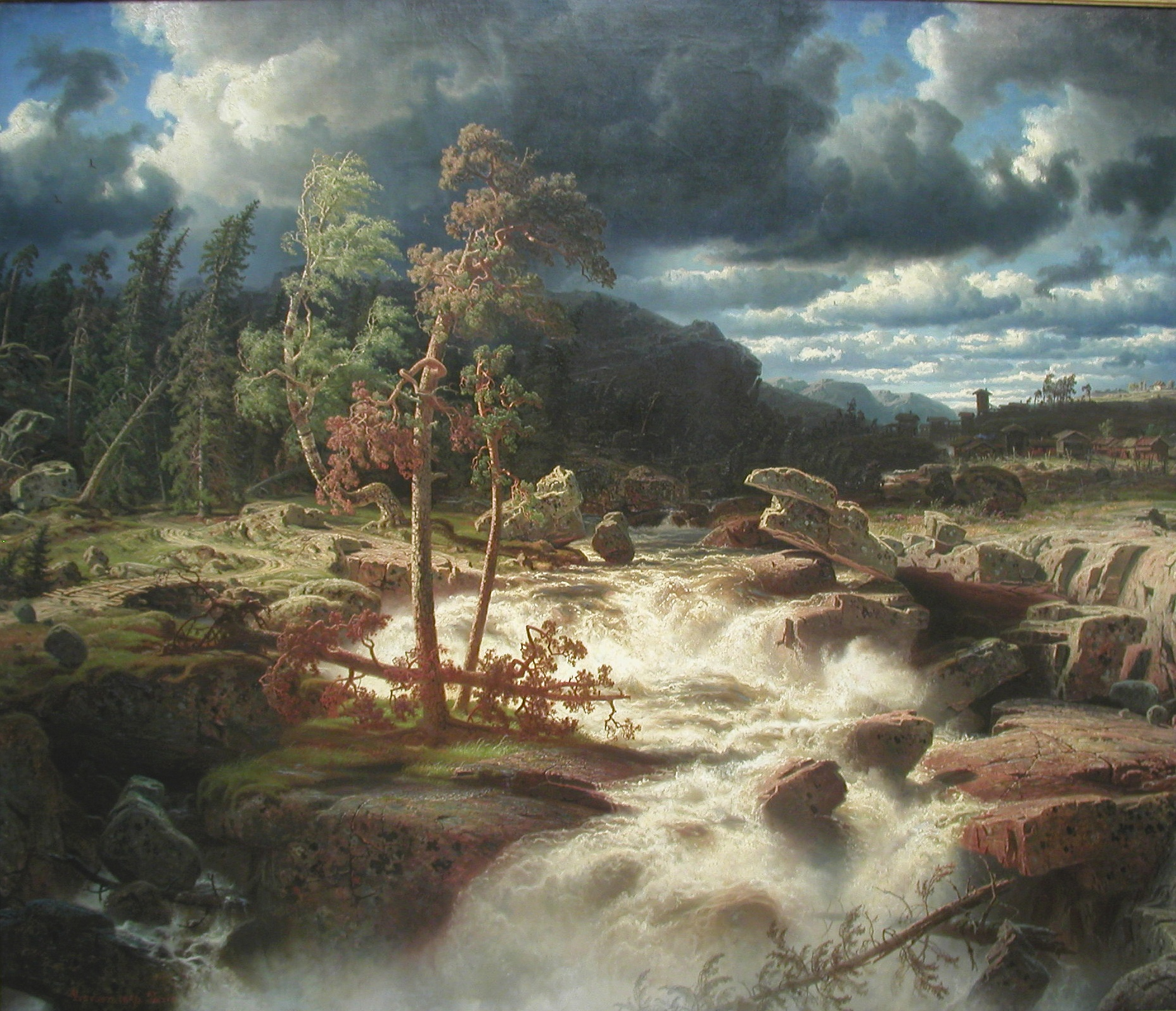
Vattenfall i Småland (1856; English: Waterfall in Småland) is Larson's most famous painting and is located at the National Museum of Fine Arts.

In 1852, Larson traveled to Düsseldorf for further education. There he received training in landscape painting from the German artist Andreas Achenbach. Larson's reputation quickly spread and he frequently received orders from art dealers in the larger German cities. In 1855 he moved to Paris, where he lived for three years and painted a number of notable paintings. One of these paintings was Landskap med vattenfall (English: Landscape with waterfall), which was awarded with "honorable mention" at the 1857 World's Fair in Manchester, England.

Larson returned to Sweden in 1858 with a small fortune and decided to settle down in the province of Småland. He built a large villa outside of Vimmerby, with the intention of starting an art school there for young landscape painters. Before starting the school, however, Larson went to Copenhagen to exhibit his paintings. He spent the autumn of 1858 and the spring of 1859 traveling between Copenhagen and the nearby Swedish province of Scania. When Larson finally returned to his villa, it was burnt down in a fire. In 1860, the indigent artist left Sweden, never to return.

After staying some time in Helsinki and Saint Petersburg, Larson traveled to London in 1862 for the World's Fair. At this time, however, his talent and reputation were decreasing. With almost no assets and suffering from tuberculosis, Larson died in London on 25 January 1864.

== Selected paintings ==
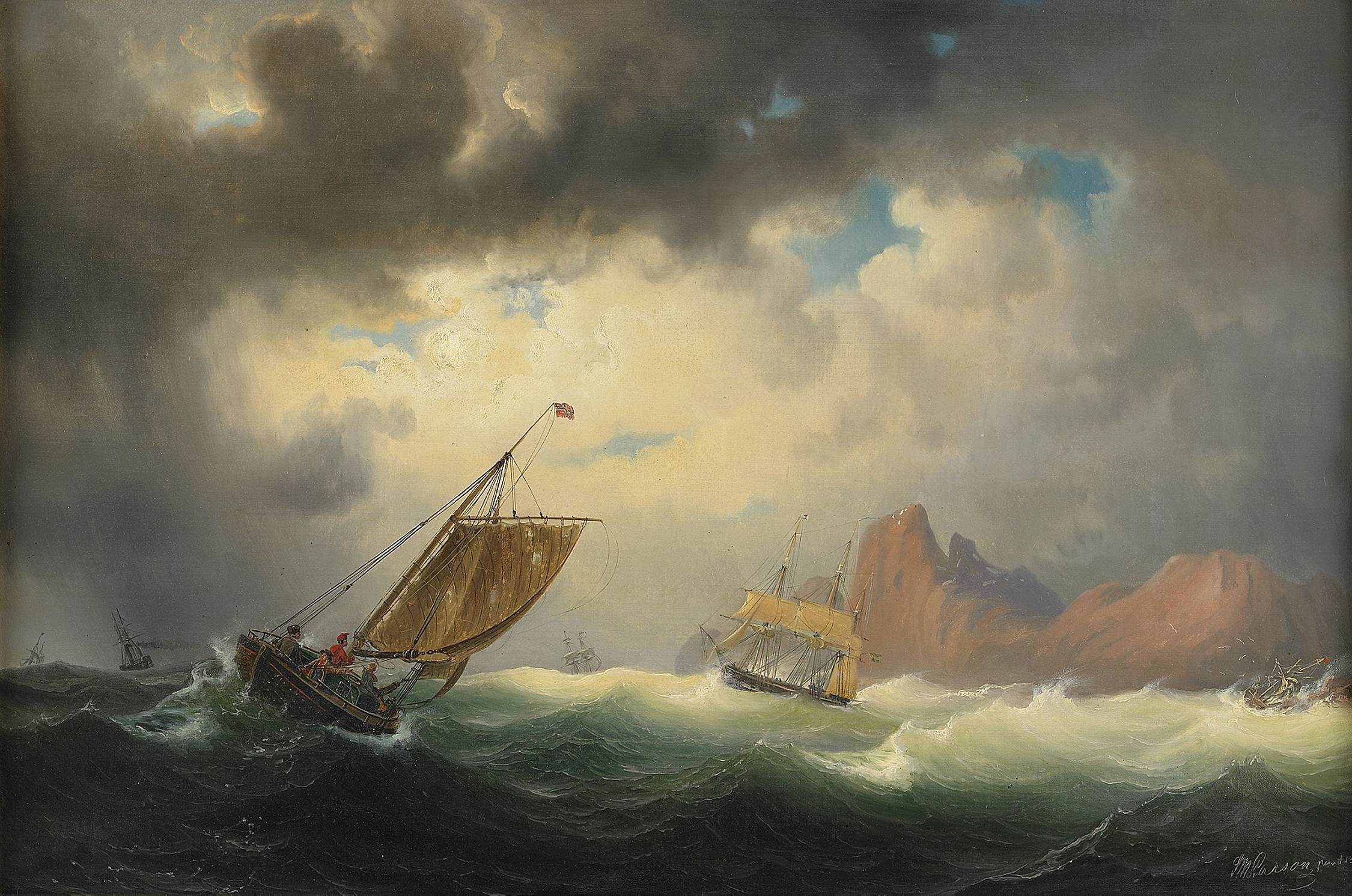
Ship on a Stormy Ocean

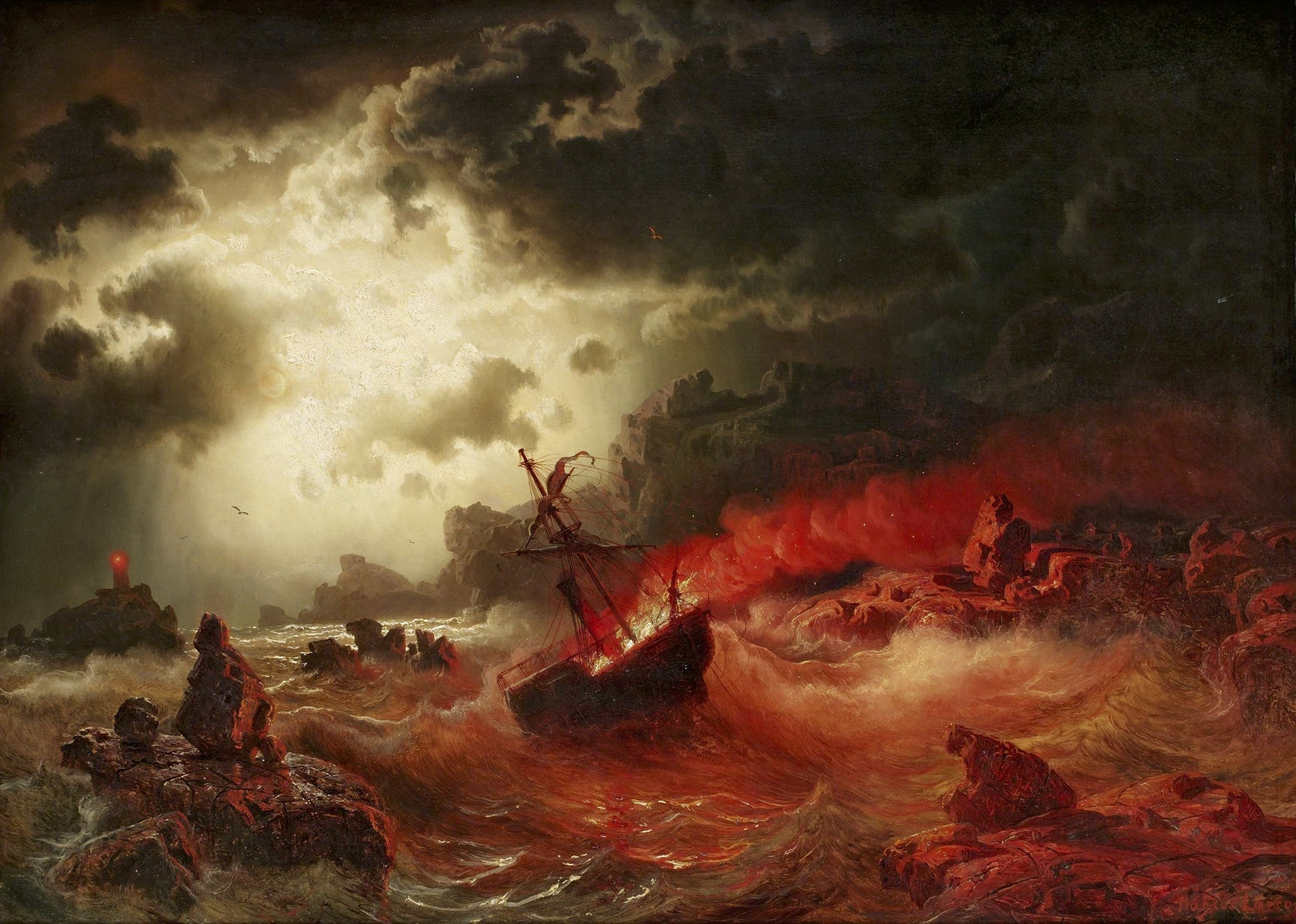
Ocean at Night with Burning Ship

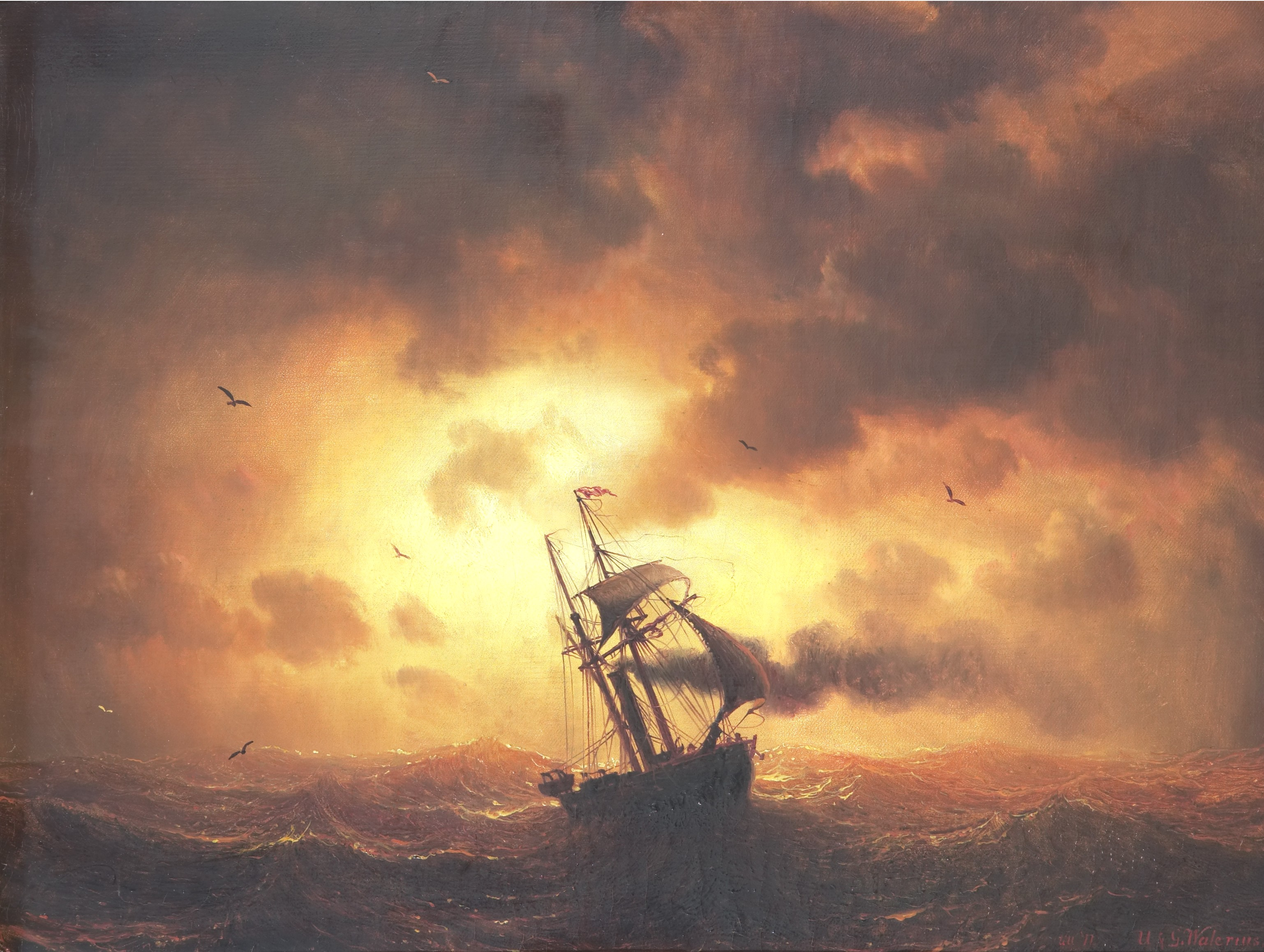
Steamship in the Sunset

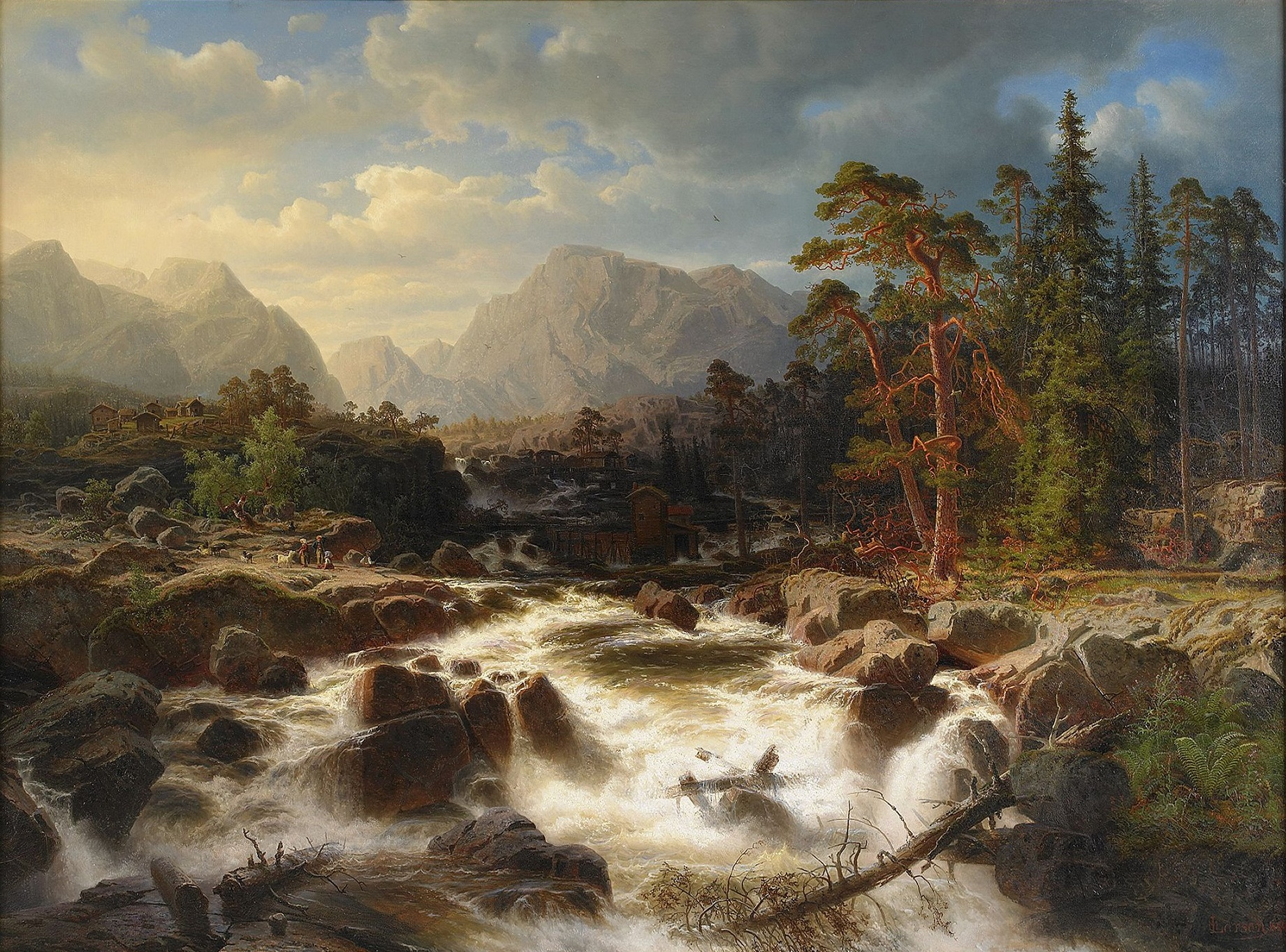
Dramatic River Landscape with Figures and Mills
