= Under röd flagg =

Weekly magazine in Sweden

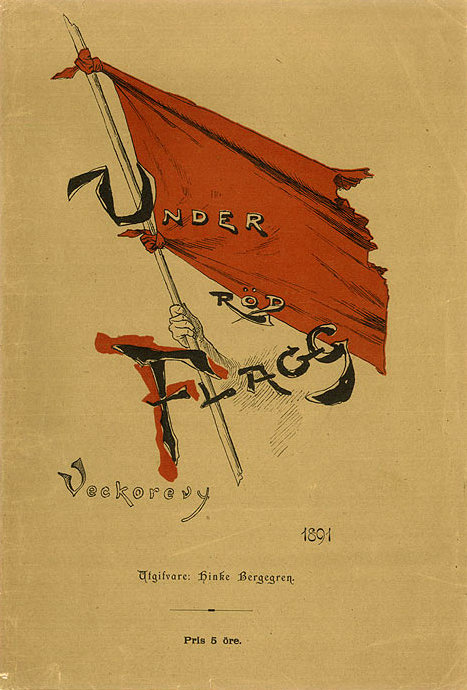
- Under röd flagg cover
- Type: Weekly
- Publisher: Hinke Bergegren
- Editor: Hinke Bergegren
- Founded: March 1891
- Ceased publication: June 1891
- Political alignment: Marxist, Anarchist, Anarchist Communist
- Language: Swedish

Under röd flagg (Swedish for 'Under red flag') was a weekly magazine published in Sweden in 1891 by Hinke Bergegren. Bergegren acted as the editor and publisher of the magazine. Nine issues were published from March to June 1891. Under röd flagg sought to bring together writers from the political peripheries of the Social-Democratic Party. Articles in the publication contained Marxist, anarchist and anarchist communist ideas. Under röd flagg was the first periodical to introduce a detailed account of anarchist thought in Sweden, for example through texts of Peter Kropotkin, Leo Tolstoy, Élisée Reclus and Swedish anarchists.

The majority of articles in Under röd flagg were signed by pseudonyms, a fact that was sharply criticized at the time.

Under röd flagg appeared in a period when the issue of tactics was a major theme of discussion within the Social-Democratic Party. The publication was characterized by frequent and radical criticisms against parliamentarism, criticisms directed towards the party leadership. The idea of a general strike as a revolutionary weapon was a concurring theme in the articles of the publication.

The first issue of Under röd flagg was published on March 15, 1891. It contained a largely programmatic article, titled Förbannelsens treenighet, privat äganderätt, religionen, äktenskapet ('The cursed trinity; private ownership, religion, marriage'). The 'cursed trinity' was said to represent the foundations of capitalism. On March 17, 1891 Social-Democratic stalwart Hjalmar Branting wrote a sarcastic rebuttal to the article in Social-Demokraten. Branting stated that Bergegren had positioned himself beyond the limits of the Social-Democratic Party. Axel Danielsson also denounced the new publication.

Under röd flagg was closed down as Bergegren moved on to become the editor of Proletären ('The Proletarian').

== See also ==
- List of anarchist periodicals
