= Risbadstugan =

1754 Swedish abuse case

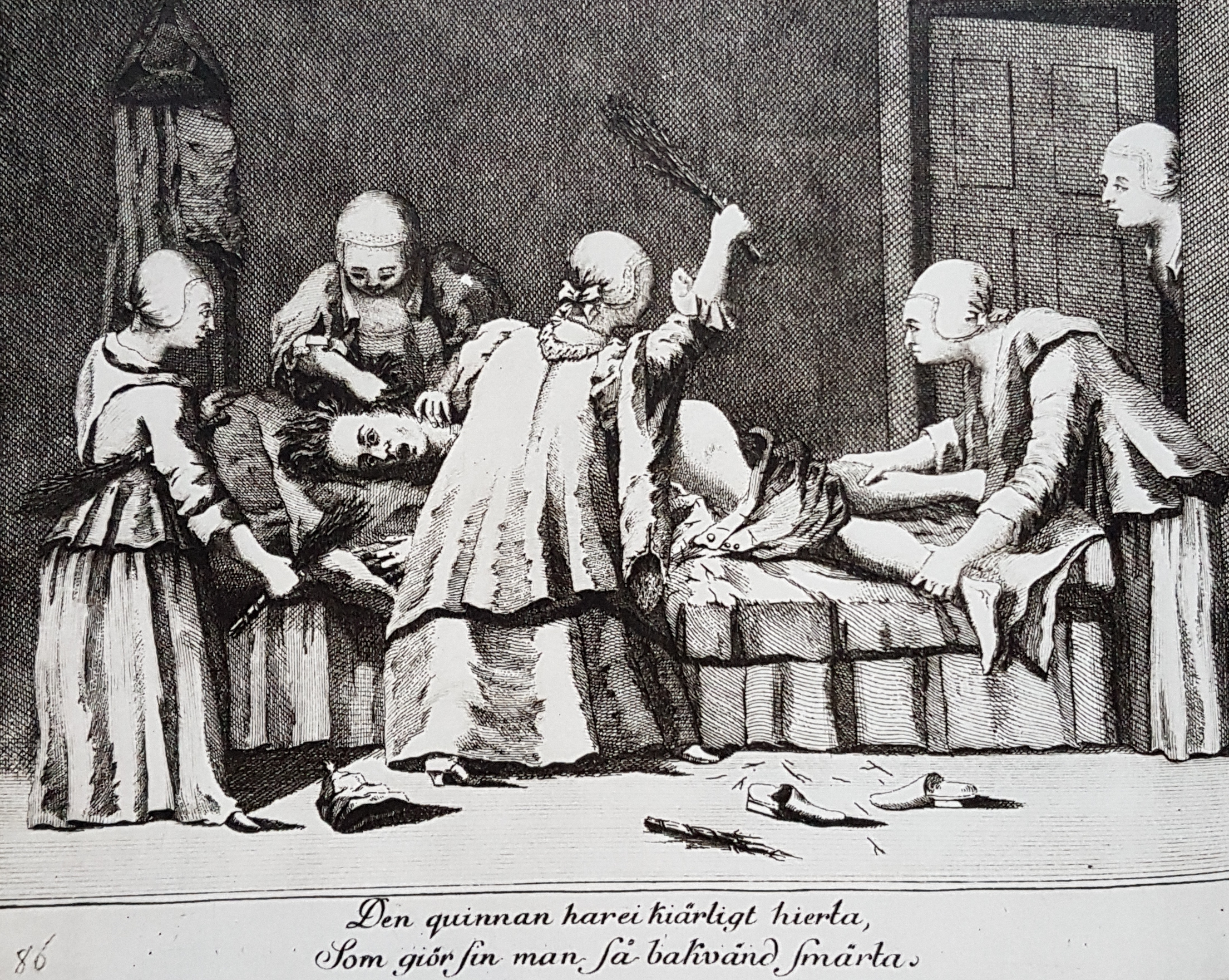
Risbadstugan. Engraving by Gillberg, 1755.

Risbadstugan (English: The name means a sauna or bathhouse where ris, or twig bundles, were used) was a Swedish case of abuse from 1754 which became famous in its time. It was later made the subject of a theatre play.

At Christmas 1754, a man in Stockholm abused his wife. She complained to a group of female friends, and they agreed to avenge the abuse. One night after the man retired to bed, he was attacked by his wife and four other women. The women beat him so hard he could not get out of bed for several days. He sued the women, who were sentenced to 70 daler in fines for trespassing.

The case became one of the most talked about crime cases in Sweden during the Age of Liberty. The press reported widely about the event, illustrations were made – among them an engraving by J Gillberg – and in 1755, a play, a comedy entitled Risbadstugan was published by the poet and author Johan Stagnell.
