= Aurora Ljungstedt =

Swedish writer

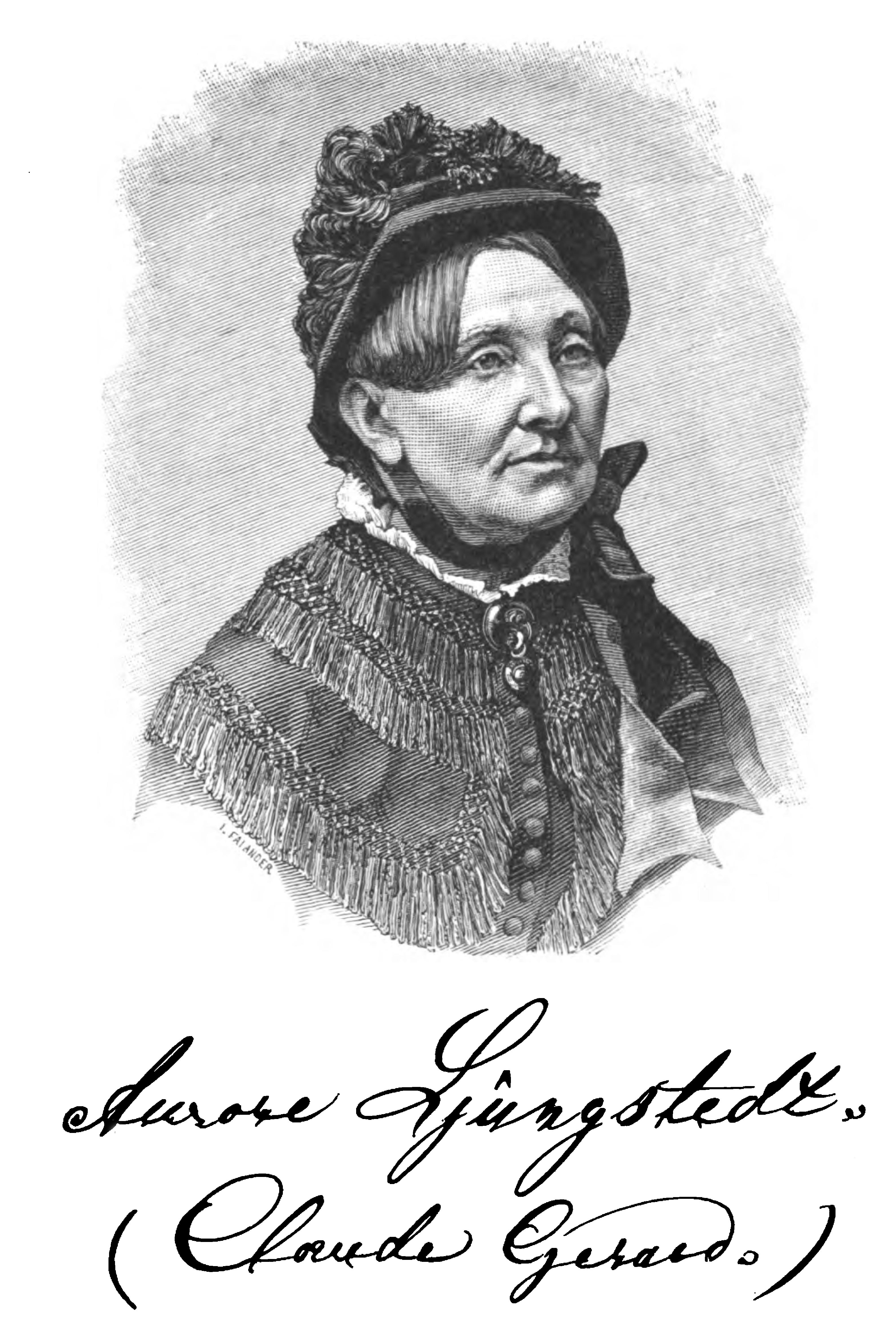
Aurora Ljungstedt

Aurora Lovisa Ljungstedt (née Hjort; 2 September 1821 – 21 February 1908), was a Swedish writer writing under the pseudonym Claude Gérard. She is regarded to be the first crime novel author of her country and has been referred to as Sweden's Edgar Allan Poe.

== Life ==
Aurora Lovisa Hjort was born 2 September 1821 in Karlskrona. She was the eldest of four children of major Georg Leonard Hjort (1788–1872) and Fredrika Elisabeth Alf (1792–1877). In 1846, she married Samuel Viktor Ljungstedt (1820–1904), an official in the prison care bureau, and settled in Stockholm. She had three children.

Ljungstedt displayed talent early on but her mother disapproved of a literary career as unsuitable as this would make her a public person. After having married, she was free to write with the support of her spouse. She debuted in the 1840s, and wrote anonymously until her pseudonym was unintentionally exposed in the 1870s.

Her crime novels were very successful in Sweden and were also translated to French and Danish. She was inspired by Eugéne Sue and Edward Bulwer and wrote crime novels in the then fashionable sensationalist horror style, often with supernatural phenomena.

Ljungstedt died on 21 February 1908 in Stockholm.

== Bibliography ==
=== Serials ===
- Dagdrifverier och drömmerier 1857 in Aftonbladet
- En jägares historier 1860–1861 in Nya Dagligt Allehanda
- Skymningsprat 1864 in Nya Dagligt Allehanda
- Psykologiska gåtor 1868 in Nya Dagligt Allehanda
- Onkel Benjamins album 1870 in Nya Dagligt Allehanda
- Jernringen 1871 in Nya Dagligt Allehanda
- Moderna typer 1872 in Nya Dagligt Allehanda
- Den svarta kappan 1872 in Svenska Familj-Journalen
- Inom natt och år 1875 in Aftonbladet
- Hvardagsliv 1877 in Aftonbladet
- Gröna Blad 1877 in Aftonbladet
- Den tomma rymden 1878 in Aftonbladet

=== Books ===
- Hin ondes hus 1853 (pseud Richard)
- Psykologiska gåtor 1868
- Samlade berättelser:
1. Dagdrifverier och drömmerier och En jägares historier 1872
2. Skymningsprat 1872
3. Onkel Benjamins album 1873
4. Jernringen 1873
5. Psykologiska gåtor 1873
6. Moderna typer 1874
7. Inom natt och år 1876
8. Hvardagslif och Gröna blad 1878
9. Diverse berättelser 1882: "Den tomma rymden", "Svarta kappan", "Gnistor i mörkret", "Tönne Rolf", "Små salongsstycken"
- Mr. Webb: reseskizz 1873
- Linné i Uppsala och Amsterdam 1878
- Soldaten Blå: historisk skizz från Gustaf IV Adolfs tid 1879
- Onkel Benjamins album (ny upplaga) 1903
- Två sällsamma berättelser (delvis omarbetad upplaga av "En gubbes minnen" och "Harolds skugga" från En jägares historier) 2002
- Hastfordska vapnet (fristående långnovell eller kortroman från Onkel Benjamins album) 2006
