= Aurora (newspaper) =

Aurora, until December 1927 known as Ystads-Bladet Aurora, was a daily Social Democratic newspaper published from Ystad in southern Sweden. As of 1957, the newspaper had a daily circulation of around 4,730.

Editors of the newspaper included J. Pihlman, Elias Nilsson, Ludvig Törnqvist and Henry Hallgren.

The first issue of Aurora was published on August 5, 1899. Then it was a weekly paper, published on Saturdays. It labelled itself as a 'left-leaning' newspaper. 1900-1902 it was published twice a week, 1902-1907 thrice a week. From October 1907 onwards it was published six times per week.

In 1910 the newspaper was titled as 'radical' and in 1933 as 'Social Democratic, pro-Temperance and religious'. Other the political label was simply 'Social Democratic'.

The last issue of the paper was published on December 31, 1957. In 1984, the Ystad arbetarkommun ('Labour Commune', i.e. Social Democratic municipal unit) began publishing a quarterly newsletter with the same name.
