= Swedish Workers Union =

Trade union in Sweden

- Svenska arbetareförbundet
- Founded: April 22, 1899
- Dissolved: 1919
- Headquarters: Stockholm
- Location: Sweden
- Members: ~10,000 (1909)
- Key people: Josef P. Nilsson, Fredrik Dahlborg

The Swedish Workers Union (Swedish: Svenska arbetareförbundet, abbreviated SvA) was a labour organization in Sweden active between 1899 and 1919. Josef P. Nilsson was one of the key leaders of the organization. SvA sought to compete with the Swedish Trade Union Confederation (LO) for dominance of the Swedish labour movement, but remained a largely marginal feature. Being sponsored by corporate interests, SvA was commonly denounced as a yellow union. Following the 1909 general strike SvA faded away.

== Founding ==
SvA was founded in Stockholm on April 22, 1899. A formal founding conference was held in the same city on November 3–4, 1899. It sought to build a non-socialist labour movement. The initiative to launch SvA came from liberal workers from a handful of factories in Stockholm, including AB Separator and L. M. Ericsson. SvA had the support of a few prominent liberals; Adolf Hedin, David Bergström and Ernst Beckman. The launching of SvA was also supported by evangelical free churches.

The foundation of SvA was provoked by the decision of the founding congress of the 1898 Swedish Trade Union Confederation (LO) to collectively affiliate all of its members to the Social Democratic Labour Party.

== Göteborg conference ==
SvA local organizations participated at a conference of Christian labour associations in Gothenburg in July 1899. The conference debated on whether to join SvA or launch a separate, nationwide Christian labour organization. In the end the Göteborg conference opted for the latter, and founded the Christian Workers Union of Sweden. However, the Christian Workers Union became short-lived as local branches defected to SvA. It was dissolved by 1900. The nine remaining local organizations of the Christian Workers Union, with a total of 243 members, joined SvA.

== Profile ==
SvA was declared as a politically and religiously neutral organization. It was modelled after the German Hirsch-Duncker trade unions. SvA was the first yellow union organizing project that gained some degree of success in Sweden. According to the organization itself, it sought to improve the living conditions of working men and women by peacefully preventing and resolving disputes between labourers and employers. The organization argued that its foremost responsibility was to provide coverage for unemployment, caused by strikes or lock-outs.

The members of SvA were predominantly religious workers.

== Organizational set-up ==
The organization was divided into seven geographical districts. These districts includes various local branches. The headquarters of the organizations was based in Stockholm. The organization was involved in negotiating collective bargaining agreements for a variety of professions.

Josef P. Nilsson, a worker at AB Separator, served as the secretary of SvA 1903–1908. Under his leadership SvA was vitalized, an agitation fund was set up and two travelling agitators were employed. All in all 193 local SvA branches were set up, but many of them became short-lived.

By 1907 SvA had 160 local branches. At its peak SvA was estimated to have had some 10,000–12,000 members.

== Arbetare-Tidningen ==
Arbetare-Tidningen ('Workers Newspaper') was the press organ of SvA. The first issue was published on April 14, 1900. Fredrik Dahlborg was the editor of the newspaper, at least until 1903.

It was initially published on monthly basis, but on July 1, 1902 it was converted into a twice-monthly publication. It became a weekly newspaper (published on Thursdays) on May 1, 1911. On December 21, 1912 it became a twice-monthly, and on October 15, 1914 a monthly. Between 1906 and 1912 the circulation of Arbetare-Tidningen vacillated between 3,500 and 4,500 per issue.

== Relations with LO ==
SvA was denounced as a scab movement by the mainstream LO, as SvA members continued to work during strikes called by other unions. Moreover, SvA had recruited well-known scabs and former union members. For example, SvA member broke the picket lines during the industrial conflict of 1905. Moreover, the fact that SvA was economically sponsored by corporate interests made it a pariah amongst the labour movement. LO characterized SvA as "an auxiliary force of corporate capitalism, which in critical situation is ready to stab the striking or lock-outed groups in the back".

There was even a satirical song in the popular movements, dedicated to ridiculing SvA;

Skynda till Josef, gulingars
kung,
Om för dig skammen kännes
tung.
Han skall Dig hjälpa med goda
råd
Till dina fula dåd.
Härligt, härligt blir det förvisst,
när på arbetsplatsen det blir
trist.

Hurry to Josef, the yellow
king,
If for you the shame feels
heavy.
He'll help you with good
advice
for your ugly deed.
However, delightful, delightful it will be
when at the workplace things turn
sour.

== Relations with employers ==
SvA obtained economic support from the employers' side. In particular John Bernström, the boss at AB Separator, acted as a patron for SvA. Bernström was also the chairman of the Swedish Works Association. AB Separator donated funds for the purchase of an office for SvA and paid massive subscriptions to Arbetare-Tidningen. The Swedish Works Association and SvA organized a joint May Day celebration at Skansen in 1905, for which AB Separator bought tickets to their employees. Bernström also gave private donations to SvA. Other companies also issued subscriptions of Arbetar-Tidningen in the names of their employees.

Moreover, the press organs of the employers defended SvA when the organization was attacked in the Social Democratic press.

== 1902 general strike ==
SvA members participated in the 1902 general strike. However, this strike was relatively short and had a largely political character (to promote suffrage rights).

A SvA representative, Axel Ceder, was included in the Labour Agreement Committee of 1907.

== 1909 general strike ==
The organization allowed its members to participate in the general strike of 1909. The general strike marked the peak of influence of SvA. As SvA had participated in the strike movement, employers began to cancel their economic support for the organization. Soon SvA went into a period of decline, with members deserting it at a rapid pace. Nilsson himself was employed by the General Electoral Union in 1910.

== Later period ==
SvA was defunct by 1915. The last issue of Arbetare-Tidningen was published on December 15, 1916. It remained a paper organization until it was formally disbanded in 1919. The last chairman of the organization burned all central archives of SvA, making it difficult for later researchers to acquire primary sources on the movement.

== Bibliography ==
- Dahlborg, Fredrik Zakarias. Hvad vill Svenska arbetareförbundet? 1904.
- Dahlborg, Fredrik. Storstrejken år 1909 och Svenska arbetareförbundets ställning till densamma: Redogörelse. Stockholm: Fören:s, 1909.
