= Betty Linderoth =

Swedish watchmaker

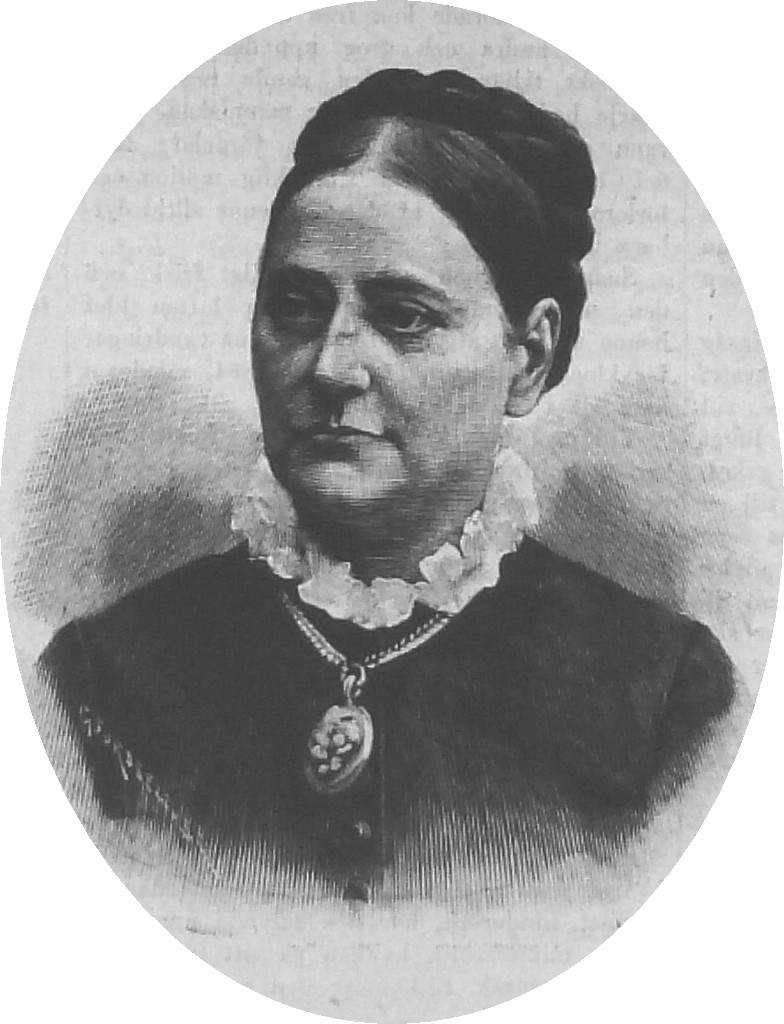

Betty Linderoth, née Cedergren (Stockholm, 13 February 1822 – Stockholm, 10 December 1900), was a Swedish watchmaker.

== Life and career ==
Linderoth was the daughter of a watchmaker, and was educated as her father's apprentice and journeyman. When she was mocked by her fellow students as a "watchmaker in skirts", she dressed in trousers and cut her hair.

In 1844, she married the watchmaker Gustaf Vilhelm Linderoth (d. 1871) and became the master of his business in Stockholm. She studied in Paris and Switzerland and was later given the task to regularly perform the maintenance of the clocks of the customers. Among her customers were the queen, Josephine of Leuchtenberg, and Princess Eugenie of Sweden. The Linderoth company had the task to construct the clocks of the nations railway stations, which were in fact made by her.

Linderoth was appointed watchmaker to the court of King Oscar II. She was an honorary member of the Stockholm Watchmaker Society (1889) and the Watchmaker Society of Sweden (1892). She as well as her spouse were awarded at the 1862 International Exhibition, making her the first Swedish female watchmaker to receive such an award.
