= Anna Christina Cronquist =

Swedish artist (1807–1893)

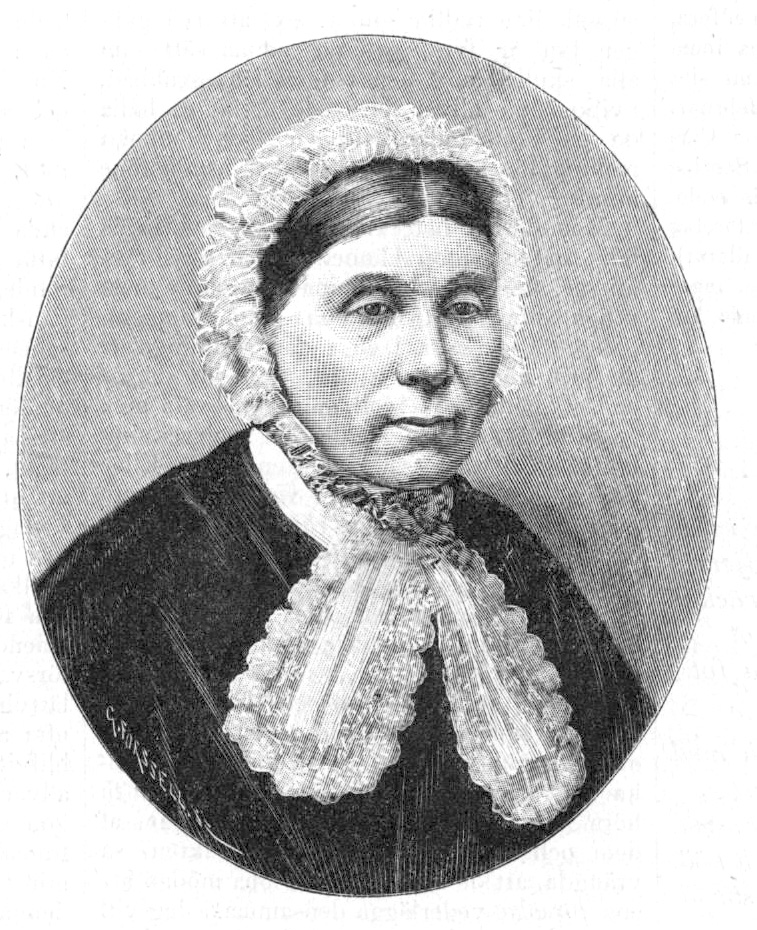
Anna Christina Cronquist, in Idun 1893, nr 12.

Anna Christina Cronquist, née Lundgren (1807–1893), was a Swedish entrepreneur. She was the founder of the firm A.C. Cronquist & Son, which was the start of the Cronquist Era within manufacture and Major appliance business in Malmö.

== Life ==
Anna Christina Cronquist married in 1830 to Johan Cronquist (d. 1852), editor and publisher of the newspaper Malmö Nya Allehanda in Malmö. As the income from the paper was not sufficient to support a family, she gave lessons in weaving: skilled in the art, she published the possibly first instruction book in weaving in Swedish in 1845.

Between 1849 and 1865, Cronquist managed a very successful textile shop, which became the biggest in Malmö and reputed in all Scania. She was likely the first married woman in Sweden to have started her own firm rather than to have inherited it, and she was also the first married woman to have started a firm in her own name: A.C. Cronquist & Son, referred to herself and her son. In an age when a married woman was legally a minor under the guardianship of her spouse, this was not an uncomplicated issue; another difficulty was that shops were formally the privilege of the guilds, despite the law of Handelsordningen, which normally only allowed women members if they were widows. Because of these issues, Cronquist were often forced to use a male Strawperson in order to handle her business until she became a widow (and thereby no longer a minor) in 1852.

Anna Christina Cronquist made her son Georg Cronquist her business partner in 1862 and retired in 1865, leaving part of the firm to her daughter-in-law and former employee Aqvilina Cronquist. The A.C. Cronquist & Son eventually developed into a major appliance firm.
