= Christian Workers Union of Sweden (1898) =

Trade union in Sweden

The Christian Workers Union of Sweden (Swedish: Sveriges kristna arbetareförbund) was a short-lived Christian anti-socialist labour organization in Sweden, founded in 1898. The organization sought to build a non-socialist alternative to the mainstream trade union movement. In 1899, the Malmö and Limhamn local branches joined a new Christian Workers Union of Sweden.
