= Elise Arnberg =

Swedish artist (1826–1891)

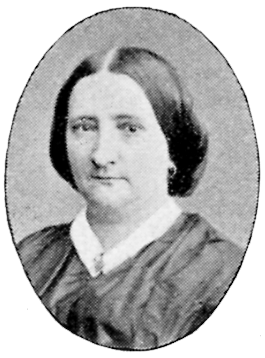
Elise Arnberg

Elisabeth (Elise) Zénaide Arnberg (11 November 1826 – 6 September 1891), was a Swedish miniaturist and photographer. She is foremost known for her portrait miniatures on ivory, but was also active as a photographer. She worked in water colors, gouache and Crayon. She frequently exhibited in Stockholm and her work is represented at the Nationalmuseum.

She was the daughter of the metalartist Eric Talén and Henrietta Engelbrecht and married the photographer Thure Arnberg (d. 1866) in 1859. She was a student of August Malmström and Anders Lundquist. Elise Arnberg lived in Falun during her marriage, but otherwise spent her life in Stockholm.
