= Anna Sophia Holmstedt =

Swedish ballet dancer and translator (1759–1807)

Anna Sophia Holmstedt (1759–1807) was a Swedish ballet dancer and translator. She belonged to the pioneers of Swedish ballet at the Royal Swedish Ballet upon its foundation in Bollhuset in 1773.

In 1774, at the age of fifteen, she debuted as a translator by a translation of the French comedy play Slafhandlaren i Smirna (Le Marchand de Smyrne) by Nicolas Chamfort in collaboration with Olof Kexel. It was recommended for "an unusually beautiful and easy Swedish". The play was performed on the Stenborg theatre in Stockholm on 24 October 1774 in dedication to king Gustav III of Sweden.

Holmstedt was admired by her contemporaries and given the recognition of a "Literary woman". When Olof Kexel founded the order of Par Bricole in 1779, the Sophia-day was chosen as its day in dedication to Sophia Holmstedt. She married sommelier Johan Gustaf Bleaumortier.

== Sources ==
- Leif Jonsson: Silhuetter ur det gustavianska musiklivet [Silhouettes from the Gustavian Music life] (in Swedish)
- Johan Flodmark: Stenborgska skådebanorna [The Stenborg Stages] (in Swedish)
- Wilhelmina Stålberg:Anteqningar om svenska kvinnor [Notes on Swedish women] (in Swedish)
