= 1755 in Sweden =

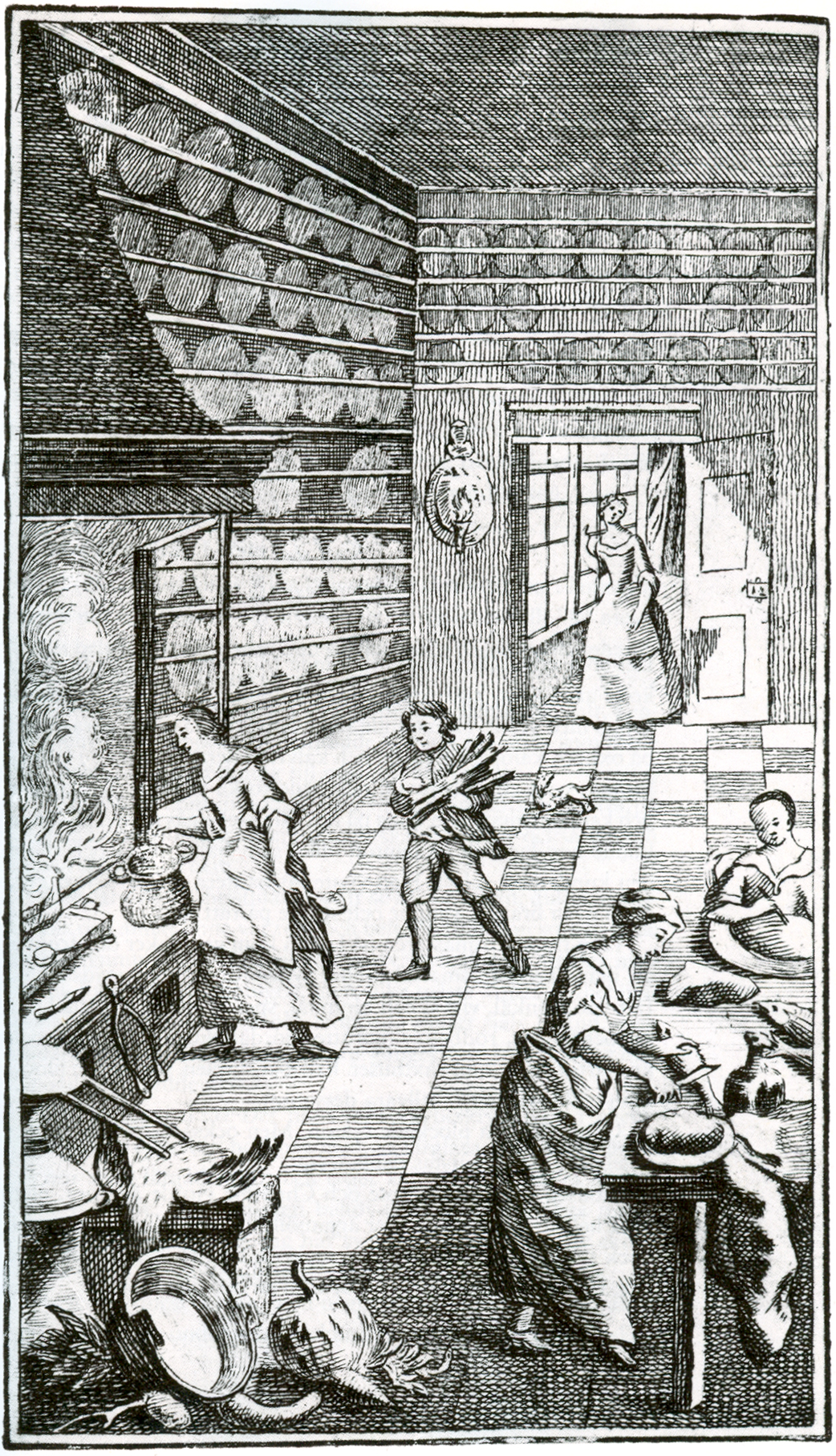
An illustration from the famous cookbook of Cajsa Warg, Hjelpreda I hushållningen för unga Fruentimber. By Pehr Geringius, 1755.

Events from the year 1755 in Sweden

== Incumbents ==
- Monarch – Adolf Frederick

== Events ==
- - Birgitta Holm is exiled for having converted to Catholicism.
- - Careening is banned.
- - First issue of the first politician paper in Sweden, En Ärlig Svensk.
- - Publication of Hjelpreda i hushållningen för unga fruentimber by Cajsa Warg.

== Births ==
- 4 September - Axel von Fersen the Younger, diplomat and alleged lover of Marie Antoinette (died 1810)
- 4 September - Adolf Ludvig Stierneld, politician (died 1835)
- 26 September - Hans Henric von Essen, politician (died 1824)
- 19 August- Helena Quiding, culture personality and builder (died 1819)
