= Edvard Swartz =

Swedish actor (1826–1897)

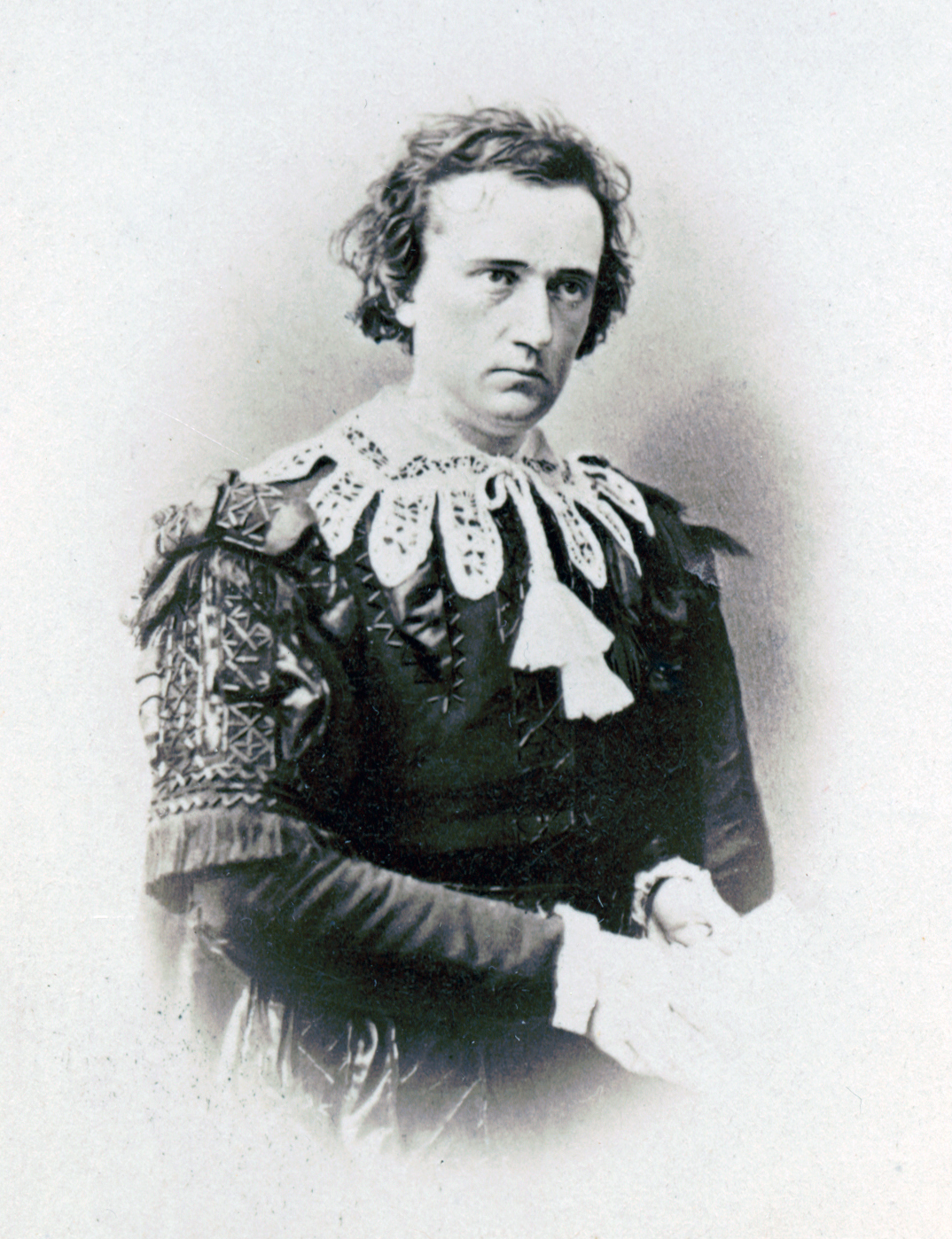
- Occupation: Actor

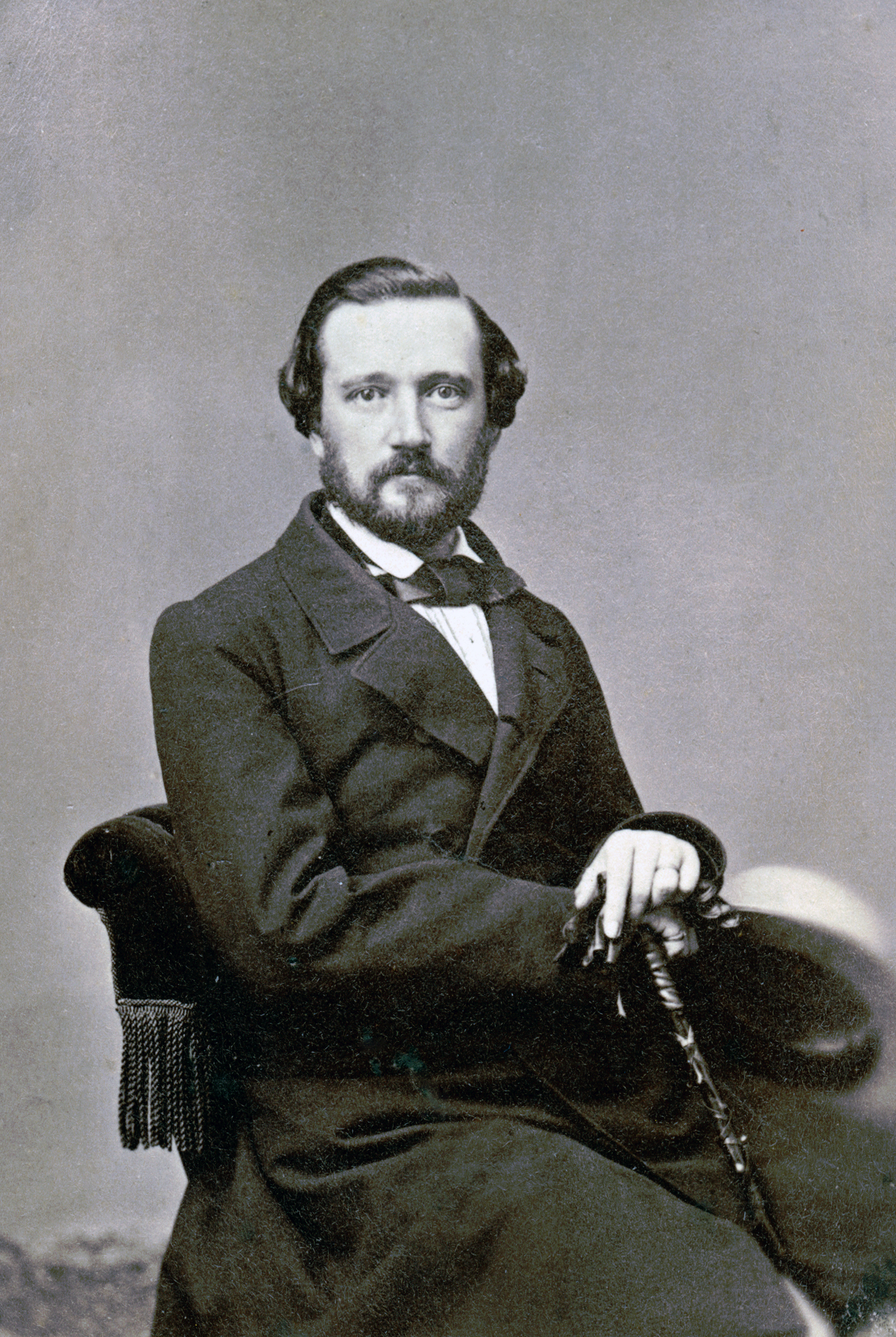
Edvard Swartz in 1870

Edvard Maurits Swartz (15 February 1826, Stockholm – 14 December 1897, Stockholm), was a Swedish stage actor. He was one of the star actors of the Royal Dramatic Theatre in the mid 19th century.

== Life ==
Edvard Swartz became a student of the Royal Dramatic Theatre in 1839, and was employed at the Mindre teatern in 1845–53 before being given a contract at the Royal Dramatic Theatre in 1853, where he made a success.

He was seen as a great talent in tragedy and hero parts, and for his "deep sense of feeling". He was considered very attractive during his first years at the royal stage: when he did the role of Rochester in Jane Eyre, the papers spoke of the "Swartzsjuka" (the "Swartz Illness", referring to attraction) which had erupted in the audience.

Among his parts were Richard II, Othello, Timon af Aten, Leontes in En vintersaga (A Winter's Tale) by Shakespeare, Sardanapalus by Byron, Fiesko, Egmont and Tartuffe, Caligula in Fäktaren från Ravenna (The fencer from Ravenna), Rochester in Jane Eyre, Louis XII in the play by Delavigne and in Gringoire, Maxime Odiot in En fattig ung mans äfventyr (The adventures of a poor Youth), Daniel Hjort, Valdemar in Ung-Hanses dotter (Young Hans's daughter), Gustaf Vasa in Dagen gryr (Day dawn), Gustaf III in En konung (A King) and Örnulf in Kämparne på Helgeland (The fighters of Helgeland).

His health was delicate and he retired in 1881.

In 1854, he married his colleague, the successful actress Clementine Fehrnström, who was also employed at the Royal Dramatic Theatre in 1853–88.
