= Christian Workers Union of Sweden (1899) =

Trade union in Sweden

The Christian Workers Union of Sweden (Swedish: Sveriges kristliga arbetareförbund) was a short-lived Christian anti-socialist labour organization in Sweden. The organization was founded in July 1899, but was dissolved the following year.

== Founding conference ==
The Christian Workers Union was promoted by sectors of the free churches. It was founded at a conference in Gothenburg, July 1899. The call for the founding conference had been done by the Christian Workers Union of Göteborg (Göteborgs kristliga arbetareförbund). Attendees included the Malmö and Limhamn branches of an older Christian Workers Union (Kristna arbetareförbundet), branches of the Swedish Workers Union and other Christian labour associations. At the Göteborg conference, there was a debate on whether to join the Swedish Workers Union or form a separate national organization. The conference opted for the latter.

According to the protocols of the organization, the delegates at the founding conference represented over 1,000 workers. However, only delegates representing 600 workers had mandates from their respective associations to affiliate themselves to the new organization. According to a statement by a delegate of the Swedish Workers Union, the new Christian Workers Union had some 500 members in total at the time of its foundation (half of them from Göteborg). Many of the persons joining the Christian Workers Union did so in response to the sharp increases in the membership fees of the Swedish Trade Union Confederation.

== Programme ==
The organization sought to counter the Social Democratic dominance in the Swedish labour movement, and it aspired to become a nationwide movement. The programme of the Christian Workers Union denounced the concept of class struggle, and advocated good relations between employers and workers. Members of Social Democratic organizations were barred from becoming affiliates to the Christian Workers Union. Nor were people having 'revolutionary convictions' welcome as members. It was not mandatory to be religious to become a member of the organization, but only believing Christians were eligible to get elected to leadership positions.

== Demise ==
The Christian Workers Union was dissolved in 1900. By this point the organization had nine affiliated associations, with a total membership of 243. These associations joined the Swedish Workers Union instead.
