= Nils Lorens Sjöberg =

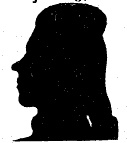
Nils Lorens Sjöberg

Nils Lorens Sjöberg (4 December 1754 in Jönköping – 13 March 1822 in Stockholm) was a Swedish officer and poet. He was the first holder of seat 18 at the Swedish Academy, from 1787 to 1822.

Sjöberg was born in Jönköping to a working-class family. At fourteen years of age, he began his studies in Jönköping School. He continued his studies at the University of Lund. Sjöberg was set on becoming a priest, but later reconsidered. Instead, he entered the Foreign Expedition in 1782. While in Stockholm, he garnered attention as a poet and won the Society Utile Dulci, Vitterhetsakademien and Gothenburg Vitterhets awards.

His poetical works include Skaldekonsten, Atheisten, Jordbrukaren, and Odödligheten.

In 1787, he became the first seat holder of seat 18 at the Swedish Academy. He held the position until his death. In 1812, at the age of 58, he became the academy's permanent secretary. Sjöberg died in Stockholm 13 March 1822. He died childless and unmarried.

Cultural offices
Preceded by First holder	Swedish Academy, Seat No 18; 1787-1822	Succeeded by Anders Fredrik; Skjöldebrand
