= 1823 in Sweden =

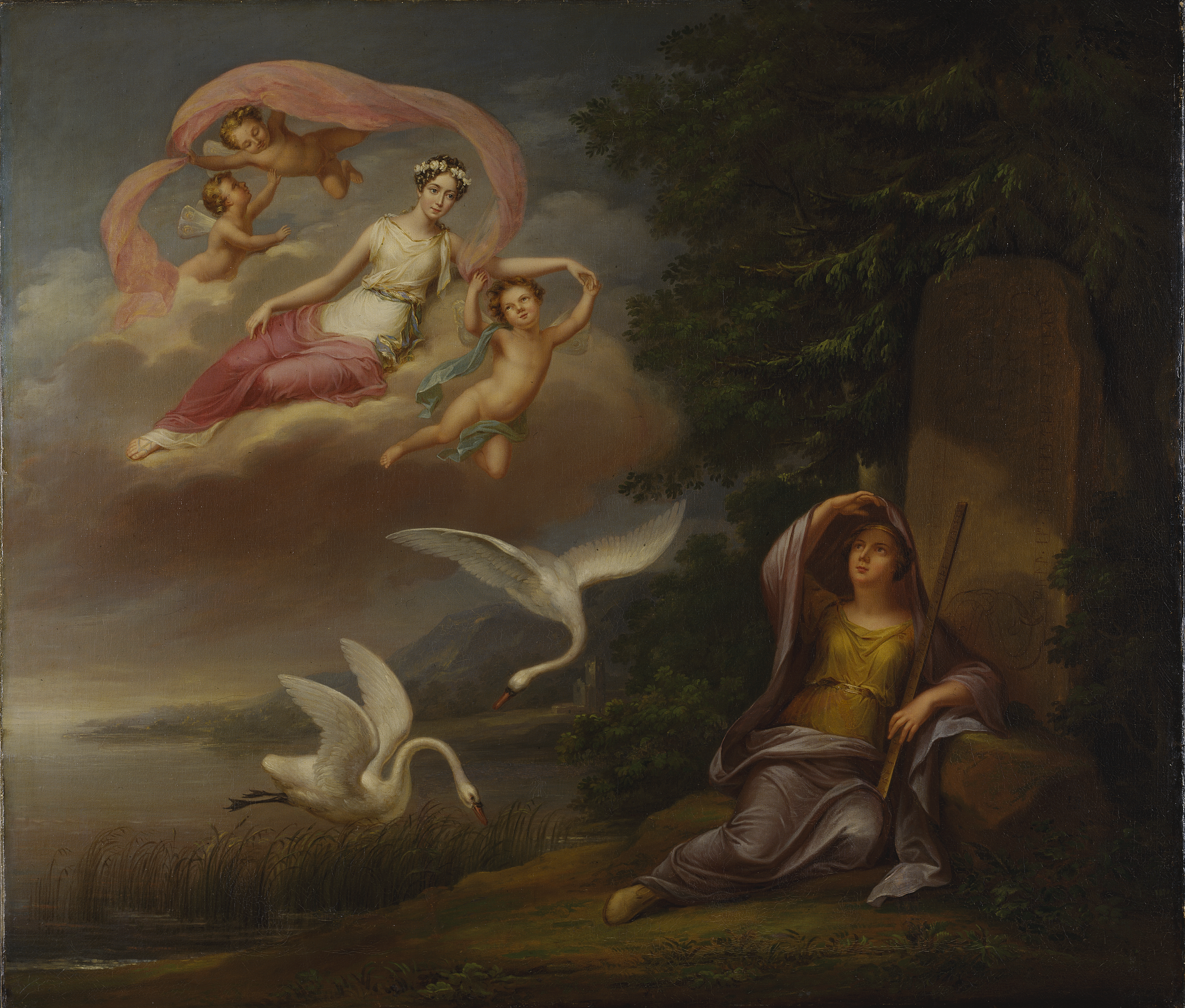
Fredric Westin, Allegori över kronprinsessan Josefinas ankomst till Sverige, 1823. This painting depicts the arrival of Princess Josephine to Sweden.

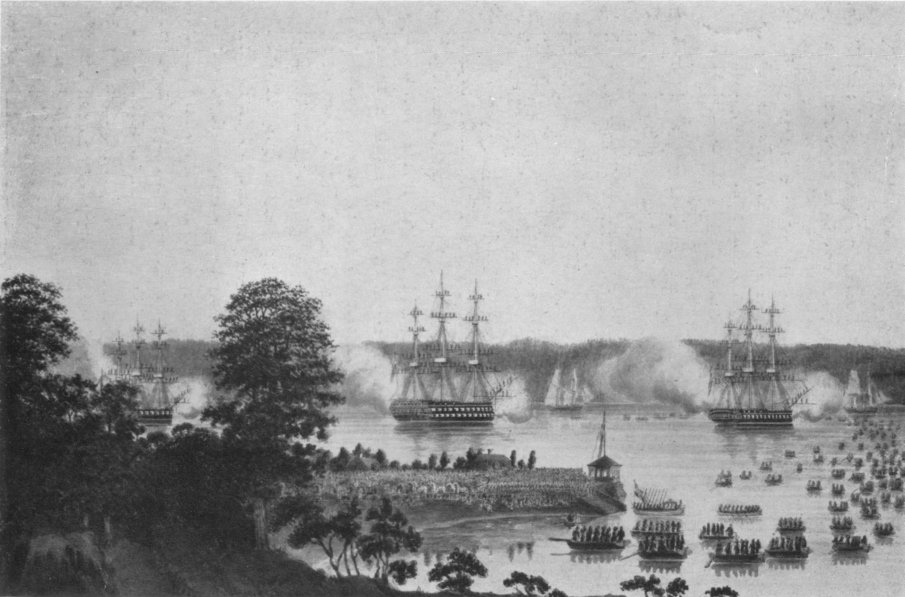
Embarkation off Manilla, 1823. Josephine arrived in Manilla outside of Stockholm.

Events from the year 1823 in Sweden

== Incumbents ==
- Monarch – Charles XIV John

== Events ==
- 13 June - Queen Désirée Clary return to Sweden after twelve years of exile in the company of her son's bride, Josephine of Leuchtenberg.
- 19 June - The wedding between Crown Prince Oscar and Josephine of Leuchtenberg in Stockholm.
- Magasin för konst, nyheter och moder, the first Swedish fashion magazine, is published.

== Births ==
- 6 July – Sophie Adlersparre
- 25 July – Albert Lindhagen
- – Rosalie Roos
- – Thérèse Elfforss, actress and theater manager (died 1905)
- 2 December – Oscar Dickson (d. 1897) – magnate, industrialist, and philanthropist

== Deaths ==
- 3 April – Erik Johan Stagnelius
- 15 April – Louis Deland
- – Magdalena Rudenschöld
