= 1853 in Sweden =

- Decades: 1830s; 1840s; 1850s; 1860s; 1870s
- See also: Other events of 1853; Timeline of Swedish history

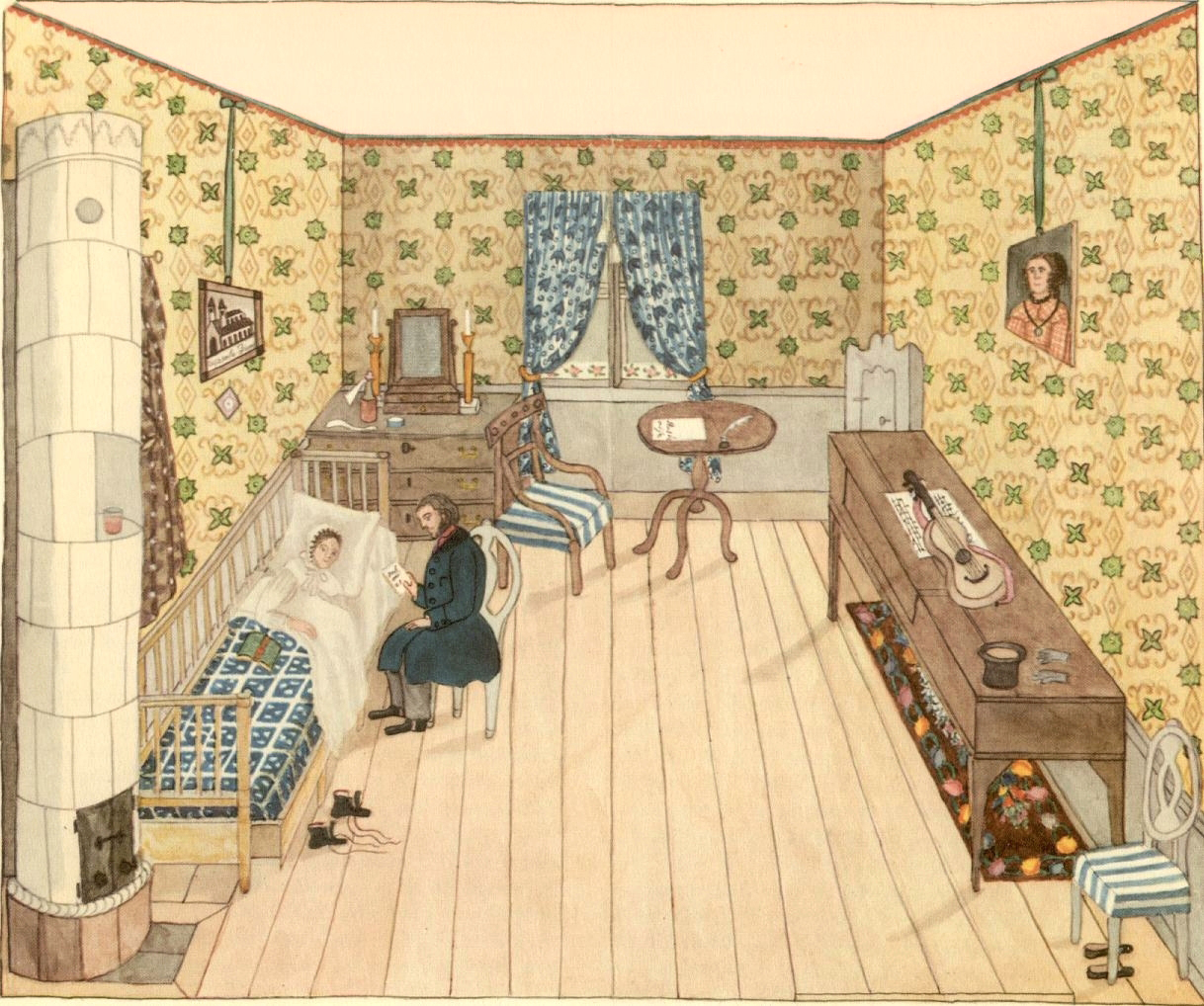

Events from the year 1853 in Sweden

== Incumbents ==
- Monarch – Oscar I

== Events ==
- The first telegraphy net was being constructed.
- The first gasworks in Sweden were implemented.
- Street lights by gas lighting were introduced in the capital.
- Coffee brand Gevalia was launched.
- The choir Orphei Drängar was founded.
- The profession of teacher at public primary and elementary schools were opened to both sexes.
- 1853 Stockholm cholera outbreak.

== Births ==
- 3 January – Sophie Elkan, writer (died 1921)
- 3 February – Maria Westberg, ballerina (died 1893)
- 15 February – Edvard Swartz, stage actor (died 1897)
- 20 February – Amanda Röntgen-Maier, violinist and composer (died 1894)
- 17 May – Carolina Östberg, opera singer (died 1924)
- 28 May – Carl Larsson, painter (died 1919)
- 11 June – Alma Åkermark, feminist and editor (died 1933)
- 10 September – Gertrud Adelborg, leading member of the women's rights movement (died 1942)

== Deaths ==
- 15 February – Frans Preumayr, musician and conductor (born 1782)
- 'The Artist's Study Portfolio' by Niklas Robert Leffler
  7 March – Mauritz Frumerie, medal engraver and lithographer (born 1775)
- 9 April – Pehr Axel Fröst, priest, theologian, and singer (born 1802)
- 15 April – Alexis Lindblom, philosopher and botanist (born 1807)
- 19 April – Sven Erlandsson, tapestry maker (born 1768)
- 30 April – Nils Petter Ehrnberg, industrialist (born 1804)
- 4 May – Thure Gabriel Adlerbrant, jurist and councillor (born 1780)
- 15 May – Johan Abraham Aleander, cartoonist (born 1766)
- 17 May – Claes Himberg, artist (born 1787)
- 5 June – Maria Johanna Görtz, painter (born 1783)
- 8 June – Gustaf Keyser, merchant and missionary (born 1785)
- 12 June – Bengt Andersson, merchant and politician (born 1795)
- 16 August – Johannes Swartz, manufacturer (born 1790)
- 18 August – Anna Myhrman, artist (born 1785)
- 25 August – Johan Leonard Belfrage, printmaker (born 1800)
- 29 August – Magnus Fürst, physician (born 1823)
- 2 September – Johan Peter Ericsson, organist and composer (born 1806)
- 15 September – Ludvig Persson Lundgren, medal engraver (born 1789)
- 17 September – Maria Christina Strömberg, ballet dancer and actress (born 1777)
- 23 September – Gustaf Fredrik Åkerhielm, colonel and theatre director (born 1776)
- 25 September – Fredrik Blom, military officer and architect (born 1781)
- 27 September – Gudmund Leonard Silverstolpe, poet (born 1815)
- 18 October – Lars Augustin Bång, shipbuilder (born 1806)
- 22 October – Anders Lundquist, artist (born 1803)
- 29 October – Carl Erengisle Hyltén-Cavallius, pharmacist and chemist (born 1817)
- 1 November – Nils Andersson, murderer and arsonist
- 1 November – Jöns Göransson Ramberg, murderer and arsonist
- 2 November – Georg Günther, organist and composer (born 1786)
- 9 November – Märta Christina Sällström, actress and opera singer (born 1808)
- 6 November – Samuel Grubbe, philosopher and politician (born 1786)
- 5 December – Jeanette Wässelius, opera singer and actress (born 1784)
- 28 December – Peter Blom, artist (born 1791)

=== Undated ===
- Niklas Robert Leffler, artist (born 1811)

== Publications ==
- Fredrika Bremer's travelogue Hemmen i den nya världen ('Homes in the New World').
- Wilhelm Lilljeborg's book De crustaceis ex ordinibus tribus: Cladocera, Ostracoda et Copepoda, in Scania occurrentibus.
- Elias Sehlstedt's poetry collection Fiskmåsen: Poetisk Vår-Kalender för 1853 ('The Seagull: Poetic Spring Calendar for 1853').
- Johan Haqvin Wallman's book Försök till en systematisk uppställning af växtfamiljen Characeae, including the first published reference to the species Chara hornemannii.

== See also ==
- 1853 paintings from Sweden
- Built in Sweden in 1853
