= 1851 in Sweden =

- Decades: 1830s; 1840s; 1850s; 1860s; 1870s
- See also: Other events of 1851; Timeline of Swedish history

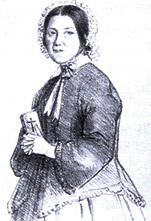
Maria Cederschiöld.

Events from the year 1851 in Sweden

== Incumbents ==
- Monarch – Oscar I

== Events ==
- 11 June – The radical author Carl Jonas Love Almqvist flees to the USA.
- 30 September – HSwMS Eugenie leaves from Karlskrona, Sweden to begin its voyage as the first Swedish Royal Navy vessel to circumnavigate the world.
- The hospital Ersta diakoni is built in Stockholm by Maria Cederschiöld (deaconess) as the leader of the first deaconesses in Sweden. There Cederschiöld establishes the first formal nursing programme in Sweden.
- Inauguration of the Södra Teatern in Stockholm.
- The Stockholm Exhibition takes place at Arvfurstens palats.
- The last major outbreak of dysentery begins, going on to kill 26,000 people.
- Aron Samson and Erik W. Wallin found the bookshop Nordiska Bokhandeln as Samson & Wallins bokhandel. It goes on to be the largest in Stockholm.

== Births ==
- 16 April – Ernst Josephson, painter (died 1906)
- 28 May – Anna Wåhlin, artist (died 1924)
- 10 August – Frigga Carlberg, suffragette (died 1925)
- 13 October – Knut Beckeman, architect (died 1943)
- 31 October – Louise of Sweden, Crown Princess and Queen of Denmark (died 1926)
- 4 November – Märta Eketrä, courtier and royal favorite (died 1894)

== Deaths ==
- 7 January – Adolf Gustaf Tamm, metallurgist (born 1805)
- 15 January – Jöns Svanberg, clergyman and natural scientist (born 1771)
- 4 February – Jacob Borelius, dean, academic, and father of Johan Jakob (born 1772)
- 9 February – William Thorburn, tea trader (born 1780)
- 12 March – Johanna Hård, pirate (born 1789)
- 12 March – Johan Fredrik Sacklén, physician and author (born 1763)
- 22 March – Göran Wahlenberg, naturalist (born 1780)
- 24 March – Nils Jacob Anjou, priest and academic (born 1781)
- 5 April – Anders Carlsson of Kullberg, Church of Sweden bishop and member of the Swedish Academy (born 1771)
- 6 April – Carl Edvard Bladh, travel writer (born 1790)
- 13 April – Gustaf Möllenborg, silversmith (born 1796)
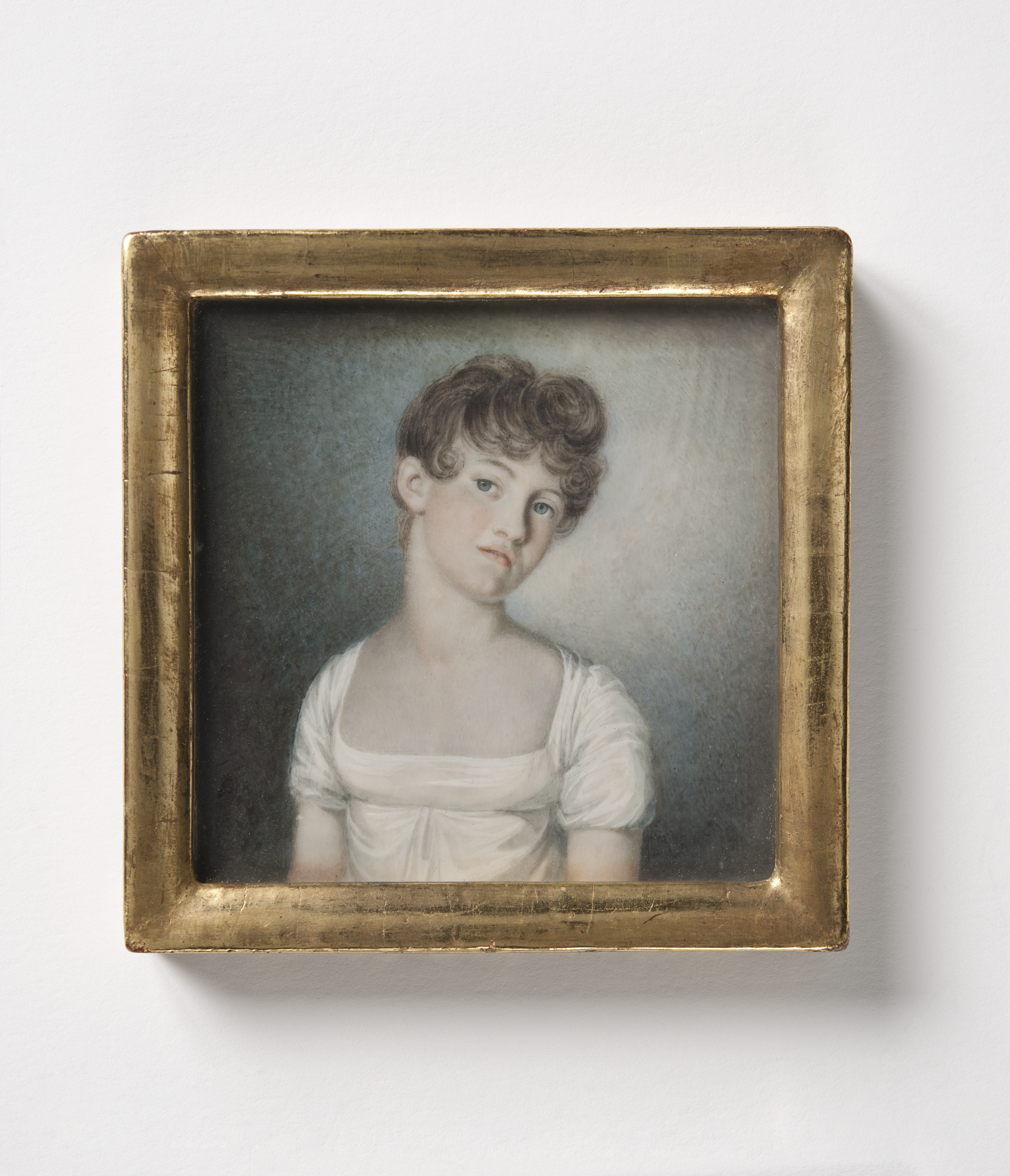
  Elisabeth Louise Schneijtz, ballerina (1767-1851)
- 21 May – Lazarus Elias Magnus, industrialist and founder of the first factory to produce Swedish-made cigars (born 1770)
- 23 May – Eric Jacob Arrhén von Kapfelmann, composer (born 1790)
- 23 June – Johan Gabriel Pettersson, watchmaker and artist (born 1788)
- 26 August – Per Erik Sevelin, actor and ballet dancer (born 1791)
- 19 September – Carl Fredrik of Wingård, Archbishop of the Church of Sweden (born 1781)
- 21 September – Johannes Hallberg, consul and merchant (born 1799)
- 22 September – Anders Julius Appeltofft, founder of Krönleins Brewery (born 1800)
- 6 October – Carl Fredrik Lorichs, military man (born 1780)
- 8 November – Johan Samuel Billing, physician and veterinarian (born 1795)
- 2 December – Fredrik Samuel Silverstolpe, composer (born 1769)

=== Undated ===
- Gustafva Björklund, cookery book-author and restaurant owner (born 1794)
- Gustafva Lindskog, athlete (born 1794)
- Elisabeth Louise Schneijtz, ballerina (born 1767)
- Anna Maria Thalén, milliner (born 1781)

== Publications ==
- Hans Christian Andersen's volume of travel sketches I Sverige ('In Sweden')
- Emilie Flygare-Carlén's novel Förmyndaren ('The Guardian')
- Marie Sophie Schwartz's novella Förtalet ('The Slander')
