= 1720 in Sweden =

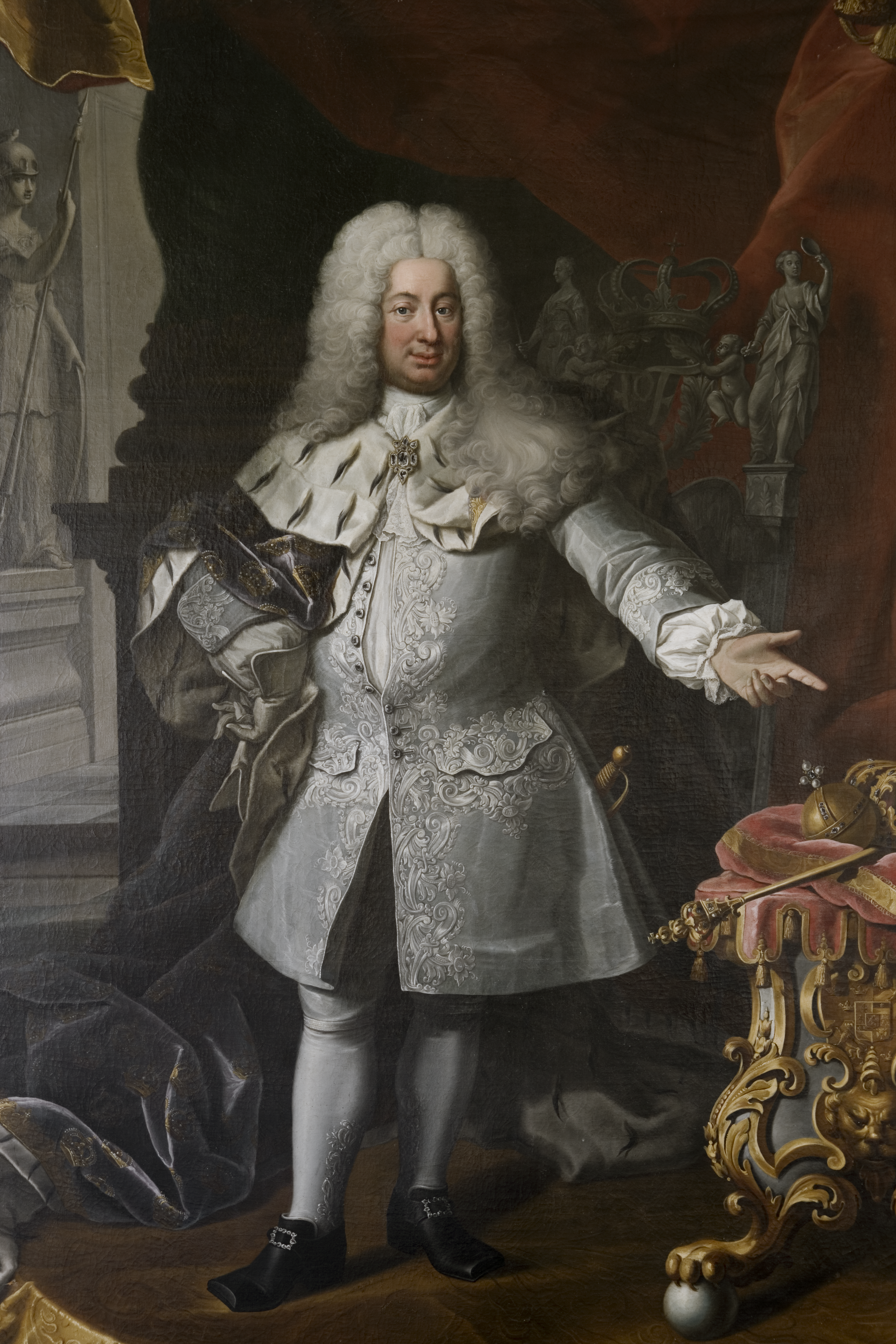
Frederick I

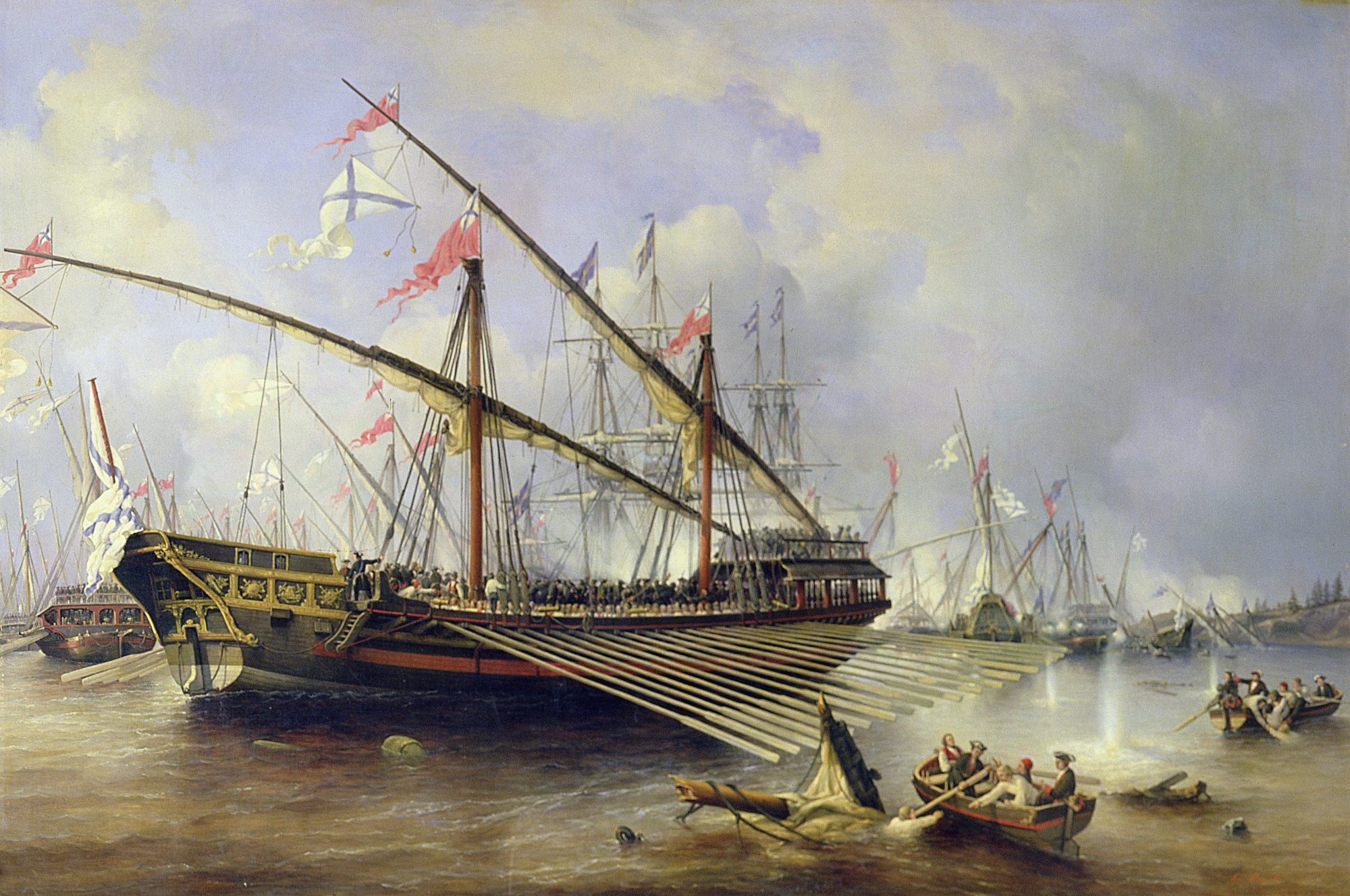
The Battle of Grengam, 1720 by Ferdinand Victor Perrot.

Events from the year 1720 in Sweden

== Incumbents ==
- Monarch – Ulrika Eleonora then Frederick I

== Events ==
- February 29 – Queen Ulrika Eleonora of Sweden resigns to let her husband Frederick I take over as king of Sweden. She had desired a joint rule, in a similar manner to William III and Mary II in Britain, but as the Swedish Riksdag of the Estates refuses this, she abdicates in her husband's favour instead.
- March 24 – The Riksdag of the Estates elects Frederick I new King of Sweden.
- 22 April – Arvid Horn elected president of the Privy Council Chancellery.
- 2 May - A new constitution is passed were the government power passes from the monarch to the council.
- 3 May - Coronation of Frederick I.
- 3 July - Peace between Sweden and Denmark in the Treaty of Frederiksborg.
- 27 July - Battle of Grengam
- 27 July - 1720 års skråordning, the first national guild regulation is introduced, which replaces all the local guild regulations and is in place until the abolition of the guild system by the Fabriks och Handtwerksordning and Handelsordningen of 1846.
- Kurbits
- A new sumptuary law bans the use of silk clothing for servants (the law is reversed in 1739).

== Births ==
- January - Charlotta Löfgren, poet (died 1784)
- 30 January - Charles De Geer, etymologist (died 1778)
- 27 May - Catharina Ebba Horn, royal mistress (died 1781)
- 12 June - Sven Rinman, chemist (died 1792)
- 8 August - Carl Fredrik Pechlin, politician (died 1796)
- 18 November - Per Abraham Örnsköld, governor (died 1791)
- - Margareta Stafhell, chalcography artist (died 1762)
- - Karin Olofsdotter, religious leader (died 1790)

== Deaths ==
- 26 January - Adam Veyde, general (born 1667)
- 24 March - Johan Peringskiöld, antiquarian (born 1654)
- 27 May - Catherine of Pfalz-Zweibrücken (1661–1720), princess (born 1661)
- - Yakov Fyodorovich Dolgorukov, politician (born 1639)
- - Henrik König, merchant (born 1642)
- - Erik Eriksson Grijs, artist (born c. 1650)
- - Mikael Riddelius, musician (born c. 1695)
