= 1834 in Sweden =

- Years in Sweden: 1831 1832 1833 1834 1835 1836 1837
- Centuries: 18th century · 19th century · 20th century
- Decades: 1800s 1810s 1820s 1830s 1840s 1850s 1860s
- Years: 1831 1832 1833 1834 1835 1836 1837

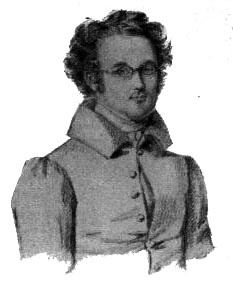
Isak Albert Berg by Maria Röhl.

Events from the year 1834 in Sweden

== Incumbents ==
- Monarch – Charles XIV John

== Events ==
- The famous coffee house Tysta Mari is opened in Stockholm.
- The newspaper Västerviks-Tidningen is founded.
- Drottningens juvelsmycke by Carl Jonas Love Almquist.
- Presidentens döttrar by Fredrika Bremer.

== Births ==
- 13 February - Alfred Wahlberg, painter (died 1906)
- 23 April - Adolf Hedin, publisher, and politician (died 1905)
- 1 March - Hildegard Werner, musical conductor and a journalist (died 1911)
- Ottilia Littmarck, actress (died 1929)

== Deaths ==
- 16 June - Giovanna Bassi, ballerina (born 1762)
- - Johanna Lohm, educator (born 1747)
- - Charlotta Aurora De Geer, courtier (born 1779)
- - Ulrika Melin, artist (born 1767)
- - Margaretha Heijkenskjöld, traveler and dress reformer (born 1781)
