= 1794 in Sweden =

- Years in Sweden: 1791 1792 1793 1794 1795 1796 1797
- Centuries: 17th century · 18th century · 19th century
- Decades: 1760s 1770s 1780s 1790s 1800s 1810s 1820s
- Years: 1791 1792 1793 1794 1795 1796 1797

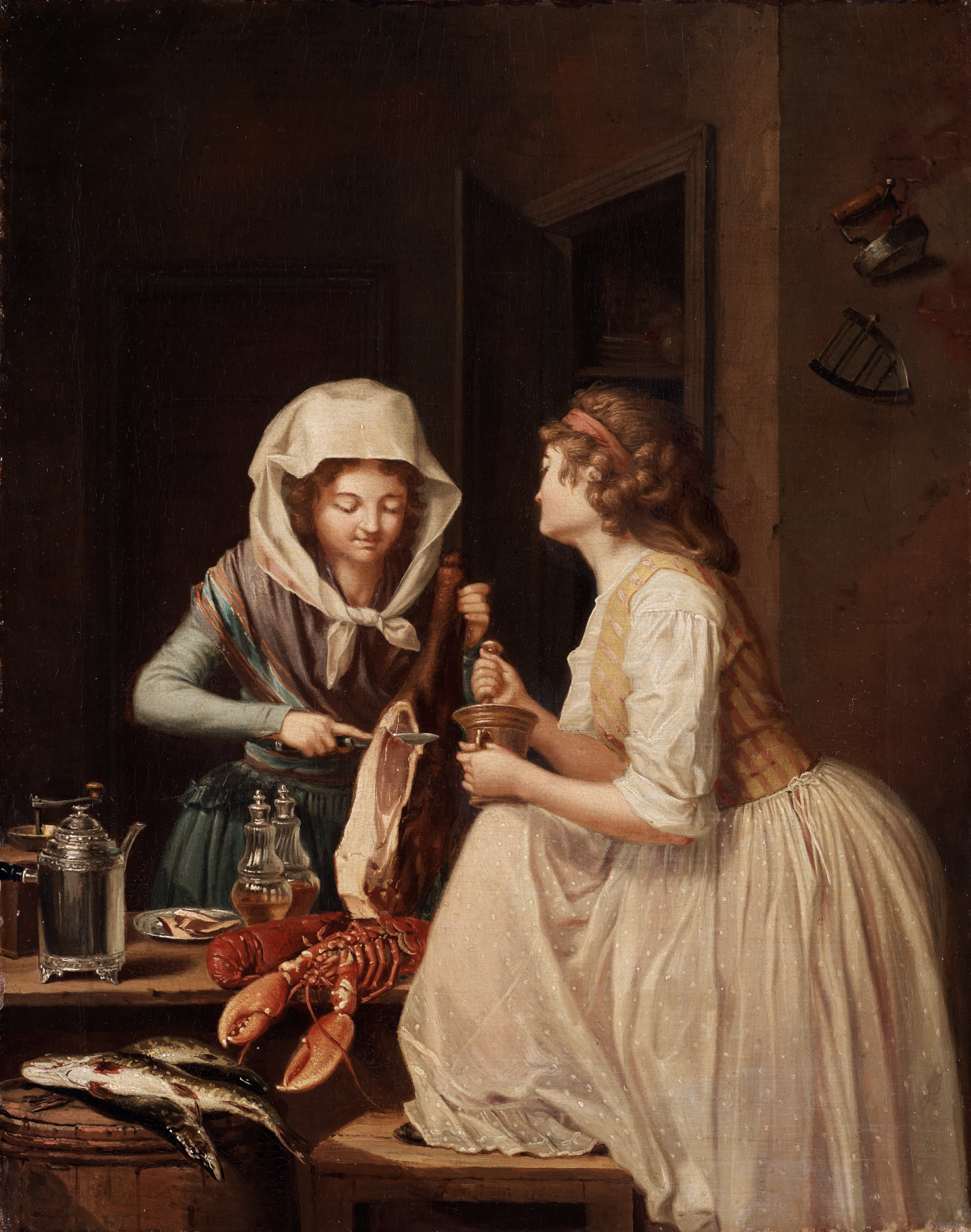

Events from the year 1794 in Sweden

== Incumbents ==
- Monarch – Gustav IV Adolf

== Events ==
- 27 March - Neutrality treaty between Sweden and Denmark to protect trade.
- 15 May - The free port status of Marstrand, the only one in Sweden, is removed.
- 1 November - The first semaphore line in Sweden.
- 23 September - Magdalena Rudenschöld is pilloried in Stockholm for her part in the Armfelt Conspiracy.
- - Anna Leonore König inducted to the Royal Swedish Academy of Music.
- - Rätt eller alla samhällens eviga lag by Thomas Thorild
- - Några ord till min kära dotter, ifall jag hade någon by Anna Maria Lenngren
- 1 August - A new sumptuary law (the last sumptuary law in Sweden) introduced a number of restrictions, among them notably the ban of the use of coffee, an extremely unpopular law, as coffee had by then been an everyday habit for all classes for decades, official farewell parties are held for coffee the days before the law is enforced (the law was abolished in 1796).
- - Creation of the Göta Artillery Regiment.
- - Creation of the Svea Artillery Regiment.
- - Creation of the Wendes Artillery Regiment.

== Births ==
- 4 October – Justina Casagli, opera singer (died 1841)
- - Gustafva Björklund, cookery book-author and restaurant owner (died 1862)
- - Gustafva Lindskog, athlete (died 1851)
- 16 March - Fredrica Ehrenborg, writer (died 1873)
- 15 August - Elias Fries, mycologist (died 1878)
- - Charlotta Eriksson, actress (died 1862)

== Deaths ==
- - Clas Alströmer, naturalist (born 1736)
