= 1779 in Sweden =

- Years in Sweden: 1776 1777 1778 1779 1780 1781 1782
- Centuries: 17th century · 18th century · 19th century
- Decades: 1740s 1750s 1760s 1770s 1780s 1790s 1800s
- Years: 1776 1777 1778 1779 1780 1781 1782

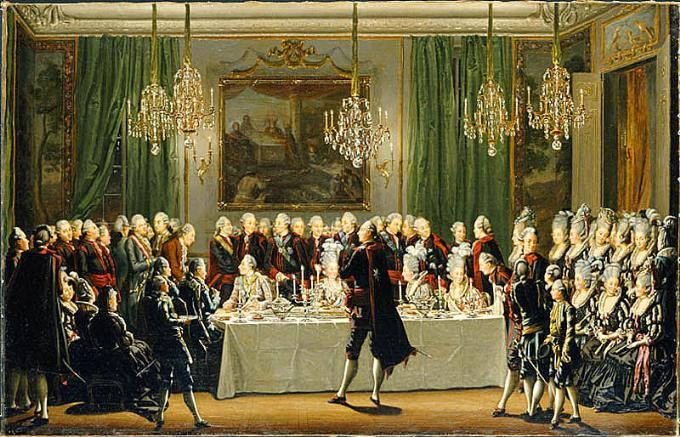
Hilleström slottsinteriör

Events from the year 1779 in Sweden

== Incumbents ==
- Monarch – Gustav III

== Events ==
- Carl Wilhelm Scheele creates Glycerol.
- The first theater in Gothenburg, Comediehuset, is inaugurated.

== Births ==
- 26 July - Erik Gustaf Göthe, sculptor (died 1838)
- 20 August - Jöns Jacob Berzelius, chemist (died 1848)
- 15 October - Johan Olof Wallin, orator, poet and archbishop (died 1839)
- Charlotta Aurora De Geer, salonist (died 1834)
- 16 December – Vilhelmina Gyldenstolpe, court official (died 1858)
- Peter Westerstrøm, mass murderer (died 1809)

== Deaths ==
- 16 November - Pehr Kalm, explorer (born 1716)
- Henrika Juliana von Liewen, salonist (born 1709)
- Jean François Beylon, courtier (born 1717)
