= 1736 in Sweden =

- Years in Sweden: 1733 1734 1735 1736 1737 1738 1739
- Centuries: 17th century · 18th century · 19th century
- Decades: 1700s 1710s 1720s 1730s 1740s 1750s 1760s
- Years: 1733 1734 1735 1736 1737 1738 1739

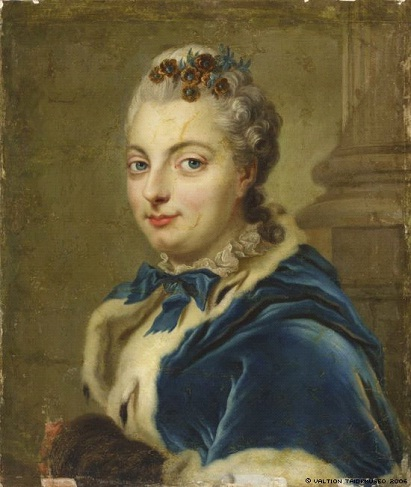
Maria Charlotta Wrangel

Events from the year 1736 in Sweden

== Incumbents ==
- Monarch – Frederick I

== Events ==
- January 23 – The Civil Code of 1734 is passed, thereby replacing the Kristofers landslag and the Stadslagen, giving the country and the cities the same law and Sweden its first national civil code.
- 2 May - A scientific expedition consisting of Pierre Louis Moreau de Maupertuis, Alexis Claude Clairault, Pierre Charles Lemonnier, Charles Étienne Louis Camus and Anders Celsius, departs from Dunkerque and travels to Tornedalen: they arrive in Stockholm on 21 May and depart for Lappland on 6 June.

== Births ==
- 9 August - Clas Alströmer, naturalist (died 1794)
- 20 December - Charlotta Cedercreutz, painter (died 1815)
- 21 July - Ulla Adlerfelt, painter (died 1765)
- 19 August - Erland Samuel Bring, mathematician (died 1798)
- - Hedvig Löfwenskiöld, poet (died 1789)

== Deaths ==
- 2 April - Brigitta Scherzenfeldt, memoirist and weaving teacher (born 1684)
