= 1789 in Sweden =

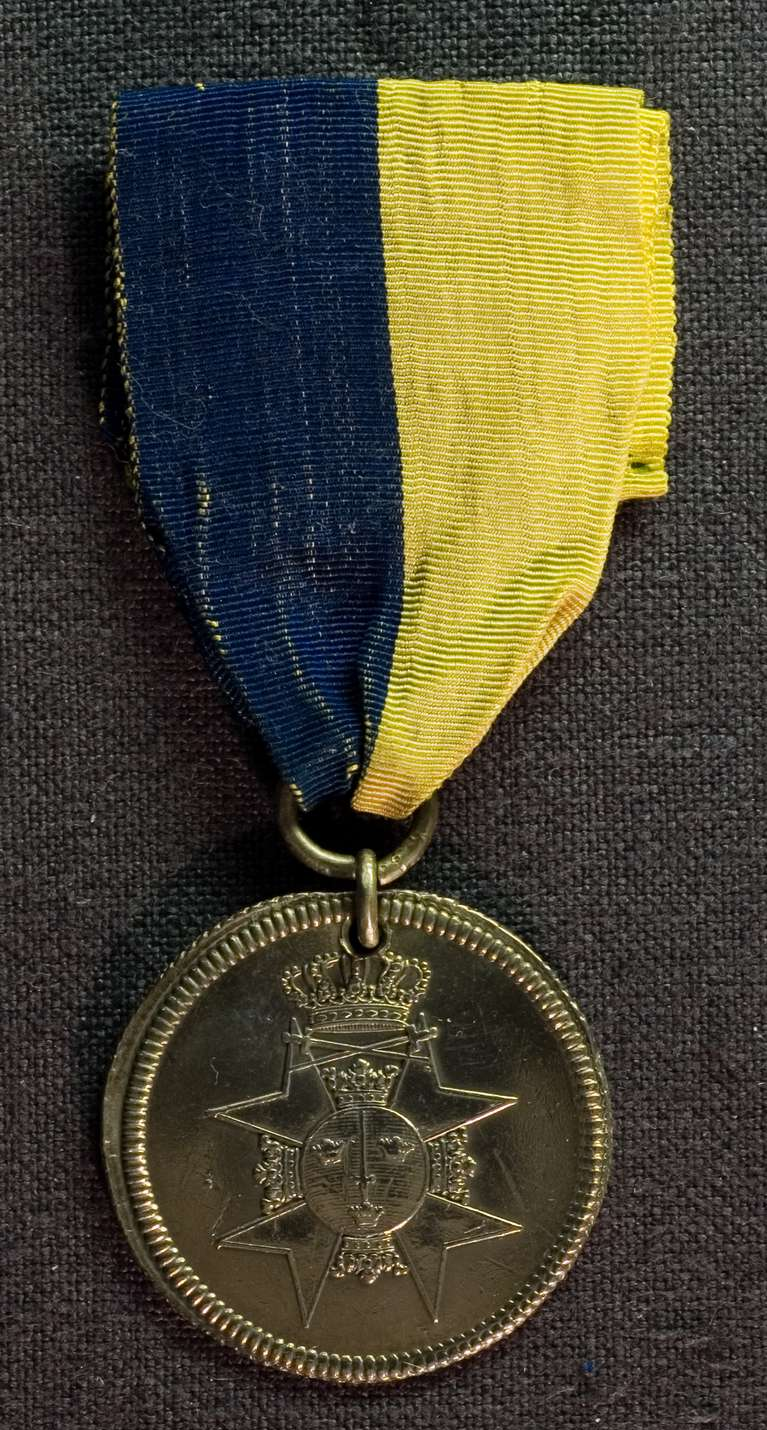

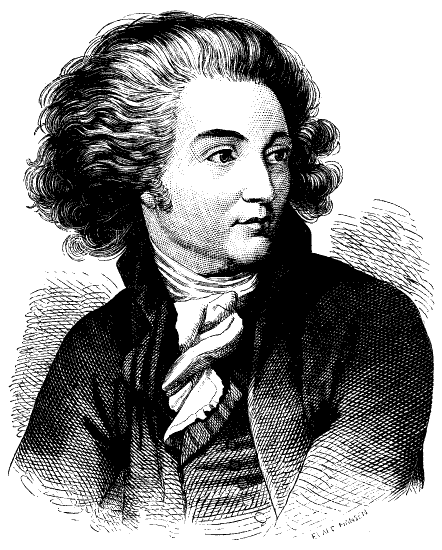
Bengt Lidner

Events from the year 1789 in Sweden

== Incumbents ==
- Monarch – Gustav III

== Events ==
- 7 January – Johan Henrik Hästesko is arrested for involvement in the Anjala conspiracy.
- January – King Gustav III summon the Riksdag of the Estates to Stockholm.
- 21 February – King Gustav III has three of four estates pass to the Union and Security Act against the will of the nobility.
- April - The Riksdag of the Estates is dissolved.
- A group supported by Princess Charlotte, Princess Sophia Albertina, Prince Frederick Adolf of Sweden and Gustaf Adolf Reuterholm attempts to use the discontent among to nobility toward the war and the Union and Security Act to depose the King in favor of his brother Duke Charles, but fail.
- May - The Supreme Court of Sweden is founded.
- 12 May - Stjärnorp Castle burns down.
- 13 June - Battle of Porrassalmi
- 28 June - Battle of Uttismalm
- 21 July - Battle of Parkumäki
- 26 July - Battle of Öland (1789)
- 24 August - First Battle of Svensksund
- A large group of female members of the court and aristocracy, led by the examples of Princess Charlotte, Princess Sophia Albertina and Jeanna von Lantingshausen, unleash a social boycott of the monarch in protest of the Union and Security Act.
- The Swedish National Debt Office is founded.
- The privileges of the nobility from 1723 is abolished.
- The peasantry of the state are allowed to hunt freely.
- The award För tapperhet i fält is introduced.
- Summer - The Hedvig Elisabeth Charlotte Conspiracy to depose the king is instigated, but discontinued, at court.

== Births ==
- 3 January - Martina von Schwerin, Lady of letters, salonist and culture personality (died 1875)
- Johan Emanuel Wikström, botanist (died 1856)
- - Elisabeth Charlotta Karsten, painter (died 1856)
- 13 November - Jean martin de ron, buisnessman and composer (died 20 February 1817)
- 3 December - Johanna Hård, pirate (died 1851)

== Deaths ==
- 9 May – Anders Johan von Höpken, politician (born 1712)
- 25 May – Anders Dahl, botanist (born 1751)
- - Françoise Marguerite Janiçon, writer (born 1711)
- - Hedvig Löfwenskiöld, poet (born 1736)
