= 1782 in Sweden =

- Years in Sweden: 1779 1780 1781 1782 1783 1784 1785
- Centuries: 17th century · 18th century · 19th century
- Decades: 1750s 1760s 1770s 1780s 1790s 1800s 1810s
- Years: 1779 1780 1781 1782 1783 1784 1785

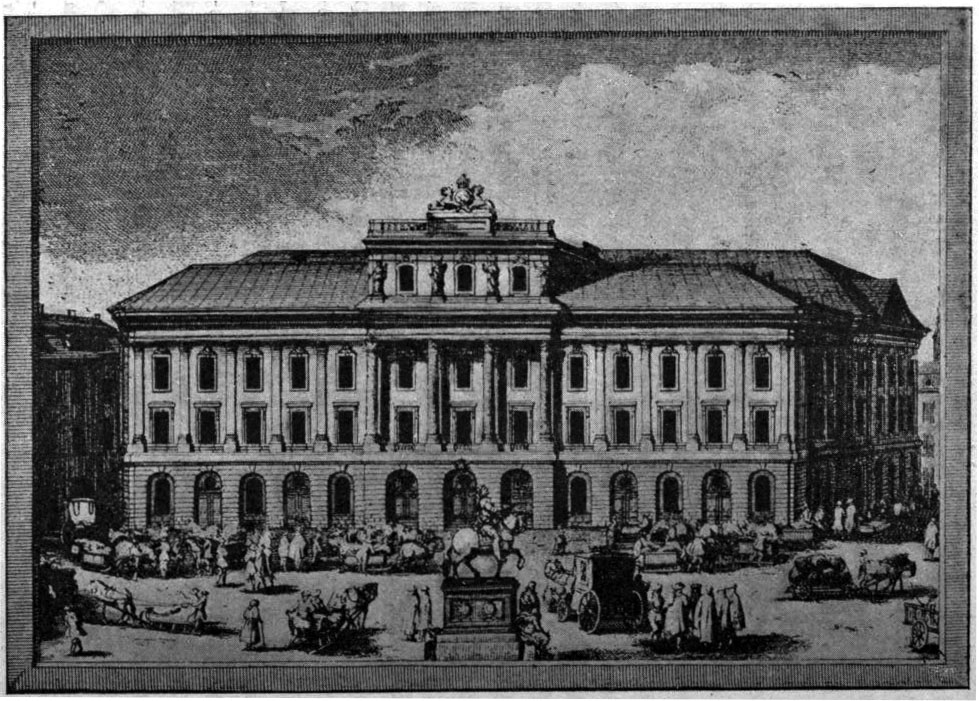

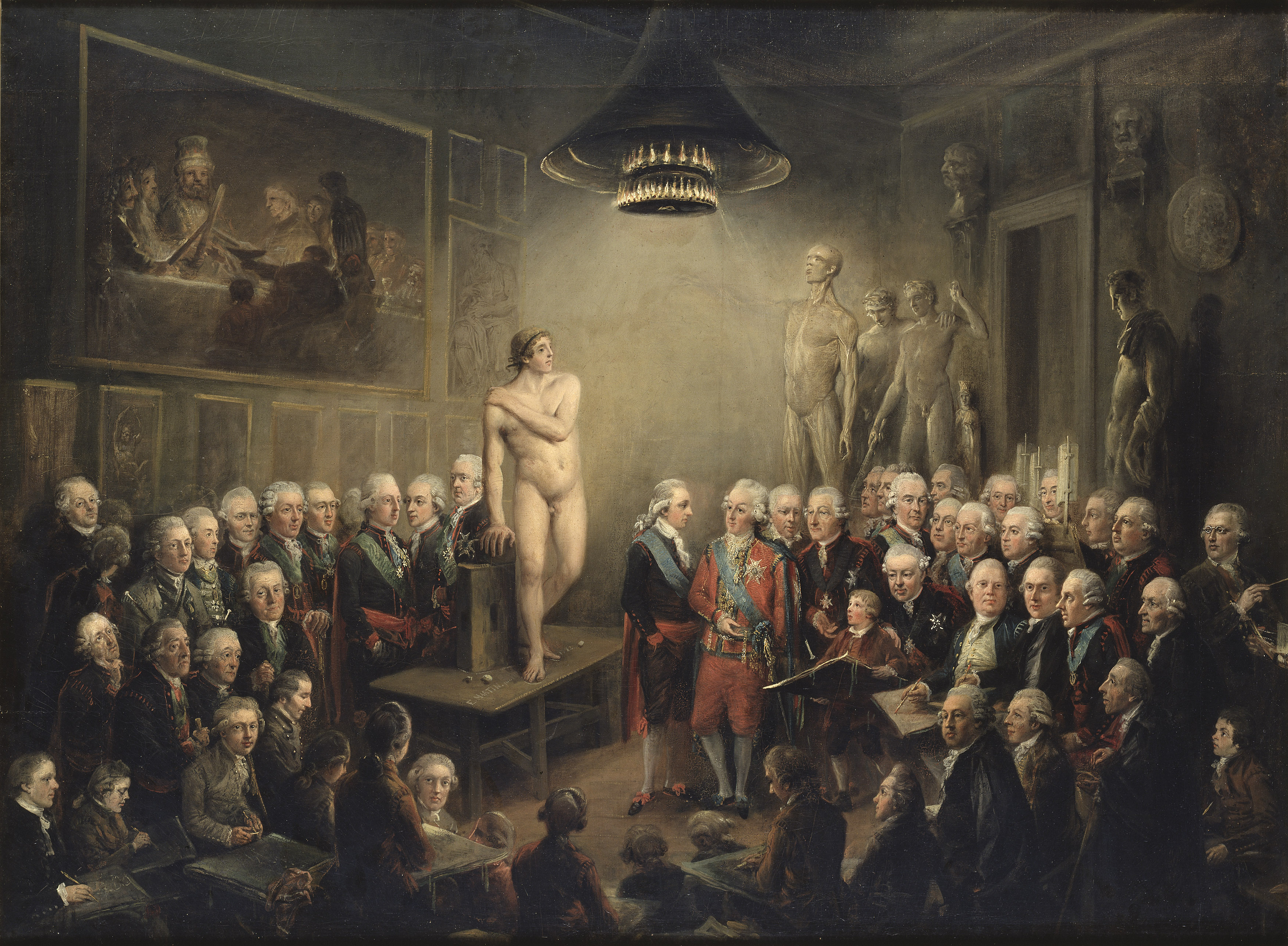
Gustav IIIs visit to the Royal Academy of Arts

Events from the year 1782 in Sweden

== Incumbents ==
- Monarch – Gustav III

== Events ==
- 27 May - Jewish immigration to Sweden is legalized.
- 19 September - Inauguration of the new building of the Stenborg Theatre in Stockholm.
- 30 September - The Royal Swedish Opera relocates from Bollhuset to a new modern opera house, which is inaugurated with Cora och Alonzo by Johann Gottlieb Naumann.
- - A Catholic church is opened in Stockholm.
- - Hydrogen cyanide discovered by Carl Wilhelm Scheele.
- - Elisabeth Olin inducted to the Royal Swedish Academy of Music.
- - Elsa Fougt becomes the manager of the Royal printing press.

== Births ==
- 6 February - Gertrud Ahlgren, cunning woman and natural healer (died 1874)
- 8 February - Malla Silfverstolpe, salonnière (died 1861)
- 13 May – Johan Gustaf Sandberg, painter (died 1854)
- 13 November - Esaias Tegnér, poet (died 1846)

== Deaths ==
- 13 May – Daniel Solander, naturalist and an apostle of Carl Linnaeus, (born 1733)
- 16 July - Queen Dowager Louisa Ulrika, queen dowager (born 1720)
- - Elisabeth Christina von Linné, scientist (born 1743)
