= 1765 in Sweden =

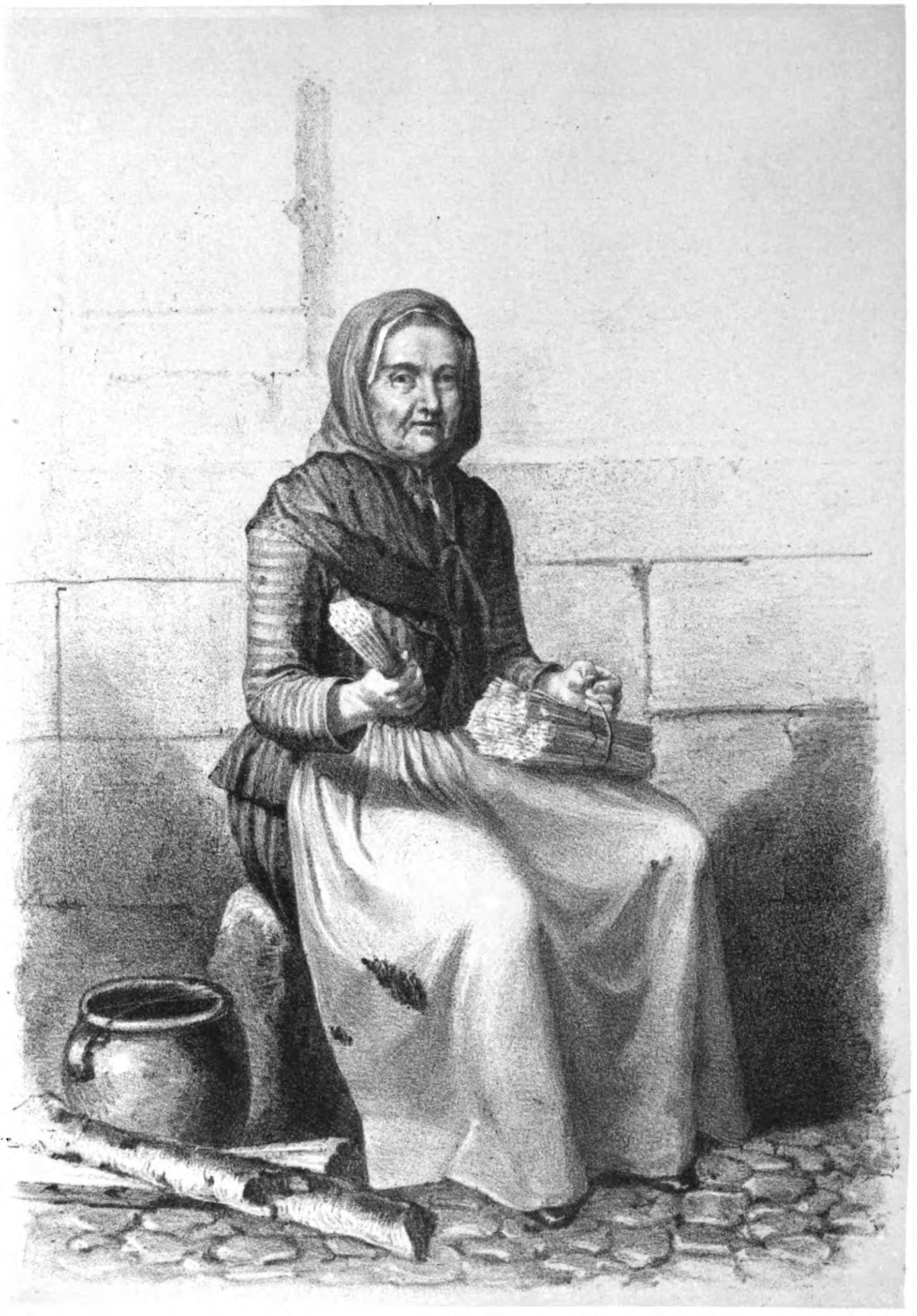

Events from the year 1765 in Sweden

== Incumbents ==
- Monarch – Adolf Frederick

== Events ==
- - Sweden forms an alliance with Russia and Denmark-Norway.
- October - A new government is formed by the Caps (party) with support from bribes from the Russian Empire and England, with the French spending more than two and a half million Swedish crowns to uphold the status quo held by the Hats. It was the first Caps government since 1738.
- - The Anna Ekelöf case.

== Births ==
- - Julie Eckerman, courtesan and spy (died 1800)
- - Sofia Liljegren, opera singer (died 1795)
- 10 January - Adolph Ribbing, count and politician. He participated in the regicide of Gustav III of Sweden in 1792 (died 1843)
- 10 June - Metta Fock, convicted murderer (died 1810)

== Deaths ==
- 1 August - Ulla Adlerfelt, painter (born 1736)
- - Samuel Klingenstierna, mathematician and scientist (born 1698)
