= 1780 in Sweden =

- Decades: 1760s; 1770s; 1780s; 1790s; 1800s
- See also: Other events of 1780; Timeline of Swedish history

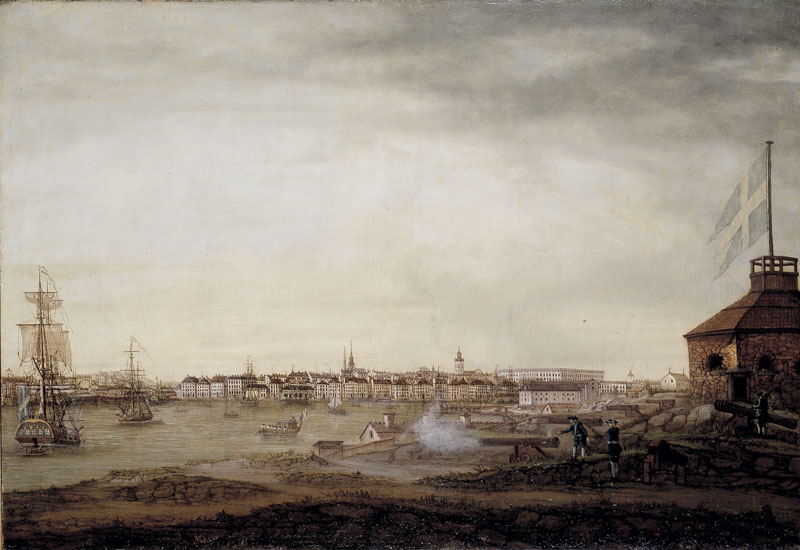
Sevenbom, Kastellholmen

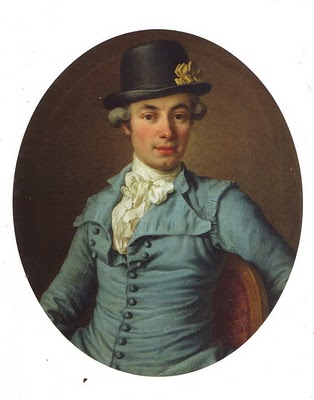
Adolf Ludvig Stierneld by Ulrika Pasch

Events from the year 1780 in Sweden

== Incumbents ==
- Monarch – Gustav III

== Events ==
- 8 June – Henrik af Trolle is appointed general admiral and chief of the Swedish naval fleet.
- August – Sweden, Denmark-Norway and Russia conduct an alliance of neutrality against Great Britain's privateers.

== Births ==
- 3 April – Abraham Rydberg, shipowner and philanthropist (d. 1845)
- 4 July – Sofia Hjärne, baroness (d. 1860)
- 15 July – Emilie Petersen, philanthropist (d. 1859)
- Bror Cederström, minister of war (d. 1877)
- Anna Carlström, licensed brothel owner (d. 1850)

== Deaths ==
- April 5 – Ulrika Strömfelt, Swedish courtier (b. 1724)
- Martin Nürenbach, stage artist and theater director (year of birth unknown)
- December - Johan Ihre, philologist and historical linguist.
