= 1785 in Sweden =

- Years in Sweden: 1782 1783 1784 1785 1786 1787 1788
- Centuries: 17th century · 18th century · 19th century
- Decades: 1750s 1760s 1770s 1780s 1790s 1800s 1810s
- Years: 1782 1783 1784 1785 1786 1787 1788

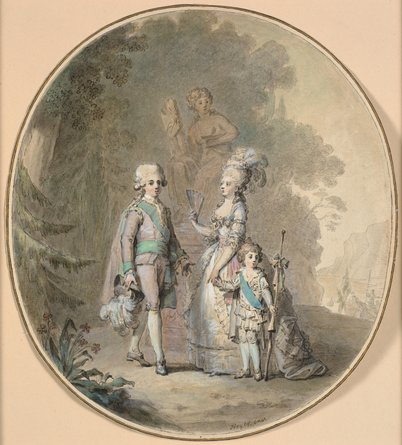
Gustav III and his family

Events from the year 1785 in Sweden

== Incumbents ==
- Monarch – Gustav III

== Events ==
- - Enskiftet begins in Scania.
- - The Barber of Seville is played for the first time in Sweden at the Stenborg Theatre in Stockholm, with Christina Rahm and Kjell Waltman.
- - Beskrivning om upstaden Örebro by Johan Fredric Bagge
- - Passionerna by Thomas Thorild

== Births ==
- 23 January – Carl Adolph Agardh, botanist (died 1859)
- February - Anna Sundström, chemist (died 1871)
- 6 May – Arvid August Afzelius, historian and mythologist (died 1871)
- 5 October – Lasse-Maja, notorious criminal (died 1845)
- – Mariana Koskull, royal mistress (died 1841)

== Deaths ==
- 30 October – Gustaf Filip Creutz, diplomat and poet (born 1731)
- 16 November – Johan Gottschalk Wallerius, chemist and mineralogist (born 1709)
- - Lovisa von Plat, brothel madam (unknown birthyear)
