= 1850 in Sweden =

- Decades: 1830s; 1840s; 1850s; 1860s; 1870s
- See also: Other events of 1850; Timeline of Swedish history

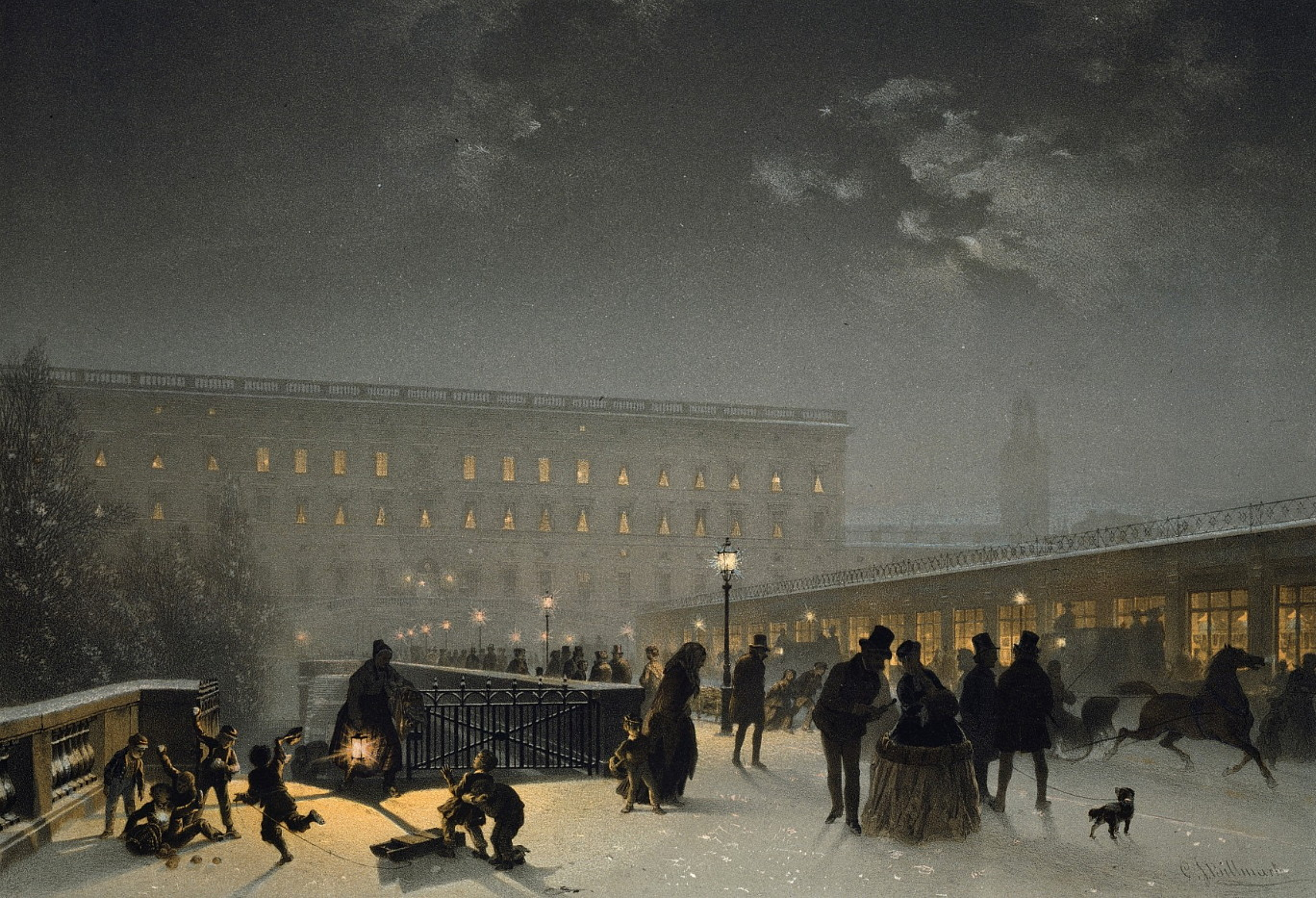
Norrbrobasaren (1850)

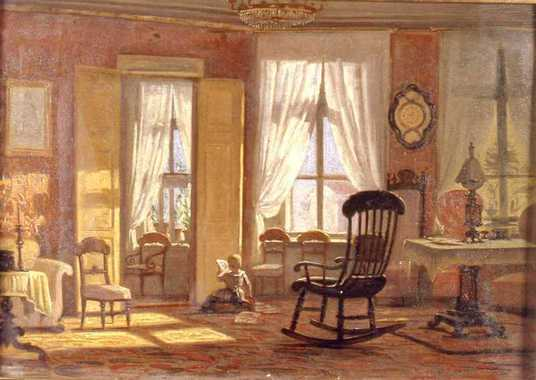
Drawing room scene painted by Johan Zacharias Blackstadius (1850)

Events from the year 1850 in Sweden

== Incumbents ==
- Monarch – Oscar I

== Events ==
- 29 January – 'The Blizzard Tuesday', or 'Stormy Tuesday,' strikes large parts of central and southern Sweden, killing roughly 100 people.
- 19 June – The wedding between Crown Prince Charles and Louise of the Netherlands.
- 30 July – First issue of Hallandsposten.
- September – Outside the village of Särna, the toddler Jon Ersson encounters a female brown bear and her cubs. Believing them to be dogs, Ersson feeds and lies with them. In 1895 Alice Tegnér chronicles the event in her children's song "Mother's little Olle."
- Eriksbergs Mekaniska Verkstad is founded.
- The Church of Jesus Christ of Latter-day Saints in Sweden is established in Sweden.
- The harpist Pauline Åhman becomes the first female instrumentalist employed at the Royal Swedish Chapel orchestra Kungliga Hovkapellet.

== Births ==
- 17 February – Ann-Margret Holmgren, author, feminist and pacifist (died 1940)
- 6 March – Victoria Benedictsson, writer (died 1888)
- 23 April – Agda Montelius, philanthropist and women's rights activist (died 1920)
- 12 November – Calla Curman, host of a literary salon (died 1935)

== Deaths ==
- 15 February – Elisabeth Forsselius, actress (born 1771)
- 13 May – Erik Jansson, leader of a Swedish pietist sect that emigrated to the United States in 1846 (born 1808)

=== Undated ===
- Anna Carlström, innkeeper and brothel madam (born 1780)
