= Jean François Beylon =

Jean François Beylon (1724 in Lausanne - 1779 in Stockholm), was a Swedish courtier of French-Swiss origin. The Villa Beylon is named after him.

Beylon came to Sweden in 1760 and was employed as a reader to the queen, Louisa Ulrika of Prussia. As it was the common everyday pastime of the queen to listen to reading and comment its content during the day, Beylon was in service almost constantly, accompanying the royal family in everyday life as well as acting as travelling companion, which made him a trusted family confidant and royal favorite. He was acted as a courier between the royal family and the Hats (party) as well as the envoys of Spain and France, and during the Revolution of 1772, he was entrusted with finances and important documents.

In the 1770s he was replaced as reader to Louisa Ulrika by Taphinon Desroches and came to be in service to Gustav III of Sweden, who viewed him as a family mentor. He attempted to mediate in the conflict between the king and his mother, but retired from court life to Villa Beylon.

== Sources ==
- Nordisk familjebok, Jean François Beylon, 1904–1926.
