= Hildegard Werner =

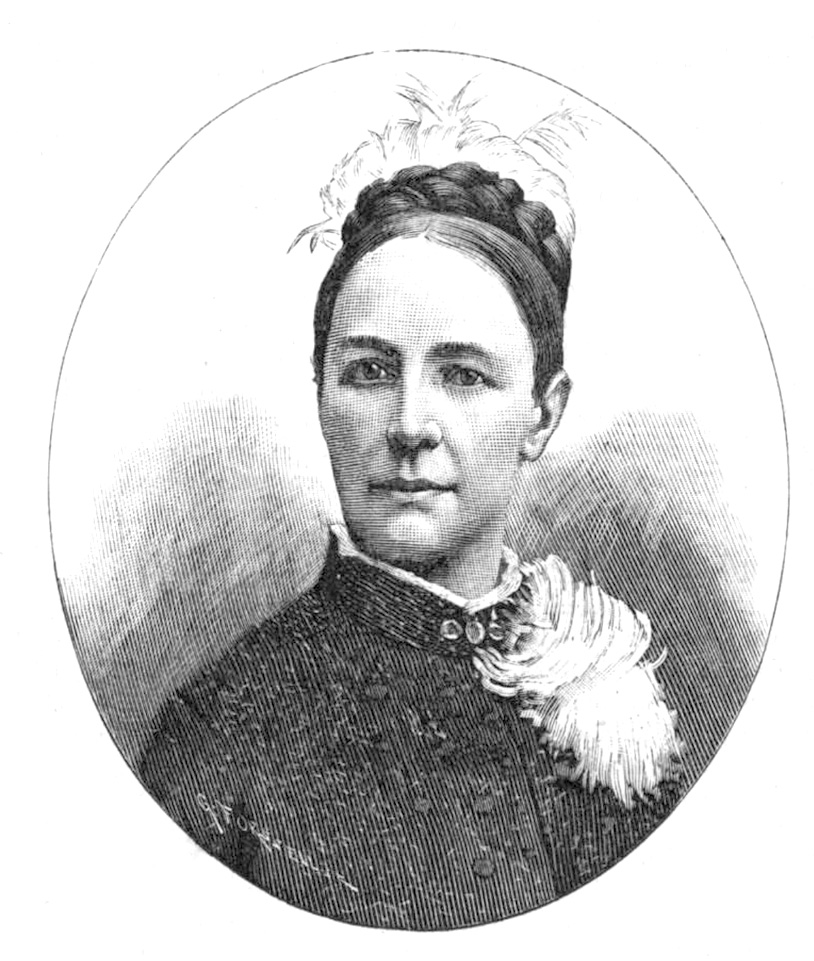
Hildegard Werner. Xylography 1893.

Hildegard Charlotta Aurora Werner (1 March 1834 – 29 August 1911) was a Swedish musician, musical conductor and a journalist active in Great Britain.

Werner was born in Stockholm and was a student at Royal College of Music, Stockholm in 1856. In 1871 she became the principal of a music school and a conductor in music in Newcastle-upon-Tyne. She was a journalist for several British papers from 1880, and also a correspondent for some Swedish papers.

She was an associée of the Royal Swedish Academy of Music in 1895. She died in Newcastle upon Tyne, England.
