= 1853 Stockholm cholera outbreak =

19th-century disease outbreak in Sweden

The 1853 Stockholm cholera outbreak was a severe outbreak of cholera which occurred in Stockholm, Sweden in 1853 as part of the third cholera pandemic. It killed about 3,000 people.

It was the second cholera epidemic in Stockholm, and the first one since the 1834 Stockholm cholera outbreak, which had been the first in the city. The epidemics of 1834 and 1853 were also the biggest cholera outbreaks in Stockholm, as both of them resulted in about 3.000 deaths.

The outbreak has been blamed on the privatization of the city's latrine and waste disposal systems, with private entrepreneurs doing a poor job at maintaining sanitation. In 1859, the city inaugurated its own central system for tending to the latrine and waste. Another cited cause of the outbreak was the use of unfiltered water as drinking water. In 1861, Stockholm inaugurated its first water works for the filtering and cleansing of the city's drinking water, a reform which resulted in a decline in the number of cholera deaths within the city's limits.

== History ==
At the time, it was not known what caused cholera. However, there were theories that the epidemics were affected by poor hygiene. It was also said that it spread quickly due to the lack of fresh water and cleanness. In this period, the latrine and waste systems in Stockholm were handled by private entrepreneurs and were in very bad condition, and the drinking water was not filtered. In 1859, Stockholm inaugurated its own central system for tending to the latrine and waste of the city, which radically improved the hygiene in Stockholm, a reform which was reportedly influenced by the 1853 outbreak. In 1861, Stockholm proceeded by also inaugurating its first water works for the filtering and cleansing of the city's drink water, a reform which resulted in fewer deaths by cholera in the city.

The 1853 Stockholm cholera outbreak was not the last cholera outbreak in Stockholm. On the contrary: from 1853 onward, it returned almost every year until it finally disappeared in 1894. However, it was never again as bad as it had been in the first two outbreaks of 1834 and 1853, and the deaths and the number of infected became smaller each time until the last time in 1894. The reason why the outbreak was not as bad as it was before, is because of public health measures that were set in place so there would be more clean waters in the area which means fewer people would get sick and die.

=== The 1853 Cholera Outbreak in Stockholm: A Turning Point for Public Health ===
The 1853 cholera outbreak in Stockholm was a major health crisis during the third cholera pandemic, and it had a profound impact on the city and its future. Cholera spread rapidly due to contaminated water and poor sanitation, leading to many deaths. While the outbreak itself was devastating, it also became a turning point that led to crucial public health reforms in Stockholm and across Sweden.

==== Cholera's Spread and Stockholm's Conditions ====
Cholera is caused by the Vibrio cholerae bacterium, which spreads through contaminated food and water. In the 19th century, cholera was a recurring threat in Europe. Stockholm experienced several major outbreaks, with the one in 1853 being particularly devastating. At the time, the city was overcrowded, and sanitation was poor. The water was unsafe, and the sewage system was non-existent in many areas, making it easy for cholera to spread.

The outbreak began in the summer of 1853 and spread quickly throughout the city. With limited medical knowledge and inadequate healthcare facilities, the death toll climbed rapidly. Hospitals were overwhelmed, and many people were treated at home, worsening the situation.

==== Medical relations and the rise of germ theory ====
One of the most significant outcomes of the 1853 cholera outbreak was the shift in medical understanding. Before this outbreak, many people believed in the "miasma" theory of disease—essentially, the idea that diseases like cholera were caused by "bad air" or decaying matter. However, the outbreak led to increased attention to the role of contaminated water and the spread of disease through pathogens.

While the concept of germs was not fully developed at the time, the outbreak accelerated the acceptance of germ theory, which would later be formalized by scientists like Louis Pasteur and Robert Koch. This new understanding shifted focus toward improving sanitation, hygiene, and water safety as the primary methods of disease prevention. Medical advancements during and after the outbreak eventually paved the way for the development of modern microbiology and public health practices.

==== Environmental factors and the role of sanitation ====
The environmental conditions in Stockholm played a significant role in the spread of cholera. Overcrowding, poor waste disposal, and untreated water were the primary factors that allowed the disease to thrive. At the time, Stockholm had an inadequate sewage system, and waste was often dumped into the water supply. This contamination made the city's residents highly vulnerable to waterborne diseases like cholera.

The lack of urban planning and basic sanitation infrastructure meant that many areas of the city lacked access to clean water or proper waste disposal. The environmental neglect was a major contributor to the cholera outbreak, and it highlighted the urgent need for urban reform. The epidemic became a wake-up call for the city and led to widespread efforts to improve public sanitation.

==== Results of the cholera outbreak ====
Pros:

- Public Health Reforms: The cholera outbreak led to significant improvements in Stockholm's sanitation system. The city eventually developed a modern sewage system, clean water supply, and better waste management. These changes were crucial in reducing the risk of future outbreaks and improving overall public health.
- Advancements in Medical Knowledge: The outbreak spurred scientific investigation into the causes of diseases, contributing to the shift from miasma theory to germ theory. This led to breakthroughs in understanding how diseases spread and how they could be controlled.
- Urban Planning and Sanitation: The need for better sanitation led to reforms in urban planning. Cleaner water, better waste management, and the development of new infrastructure were key outcomes of the crisis.

Cons:

- High Death Toll: The most obvious downside was the devastating loss of life. The 1853 outbreak claimed the lives of thousands of Stockholm residents, many of whom died due to the lack of effective medical treatment at the time.
- Overwhelmed Healthcare System: The healthcare system was not prepared to handle the scale of the outbreak. Hospitals were overwhelmed, and many people had to be treated at home, often without proper medical care. This lack of resources exacerbated the crisis.
- Delayed Action: In the early stages of the outbreak, efforts to contain the disease were insufficient. The city's inability to quickly address the poor sanitation and contaminated water led to the rapid spread of the disease, costing more lives than necessary.

==== Lasting reforms and improvements ====
In the aftermath of the outbreak, the city began to make essential changes. Stockholm overhauled its water and sewage systems, which not only helped prevent future cholera outbreaks but also laid the foundation for modern public health infrastructure. The event was a key turning point that pushed Sweden to adopt better health laws, focusing on sanitation and disease prevention.

The improvements were not just about stopping cholera but about improving overall living conditions for the population. The construction of new sewage systems, cleaner water supplies, and better waste management helped reduce the risk of many other diseases, transforming Stockholm into a healthier city in the long run.

=== References ===
1.) Gustavsson, Anders. 2020. “Nineteenth-Century Cholera Epidemics in Sweden from a Popular Perspective.” Arv. Nordic Yearbook of folklore 76:7-28.

https://www.duo.uio.no/bitstream/handle/10852/82908/1/Nineteenth-Century%2BCholera%2BEpidemics%2Bin%2BSweden%2Bfrom%2Ba%2BPopular%2BPerspective_Gustavsson_ARV2020.pdf

2.) Rosenberg, Charles E. 1962. The Cholera Years: The United States in 1832,1849, and 1866. Chicago: University of Chicago Press.

https://press.uchicago.edu/ucp/books/book/chicago/C/bo3619098.html

3.) Baldwin, Peter. 1999. Contagion and the state in Europe, 1830-1930. Cambridge: Cambridge University Press.

https://www.journals.uchicago.edu/doi/abs/10.1086/427576?journalCode=jmh

4.) Snow, John. 1855. On the Mode of Communication of Cholera. London: John Churchill.

https://academic.oup.com/ije/article-abstract/42/6/1543/740472?redirectedFrom=fulltext
