= Martina von Schwerin =

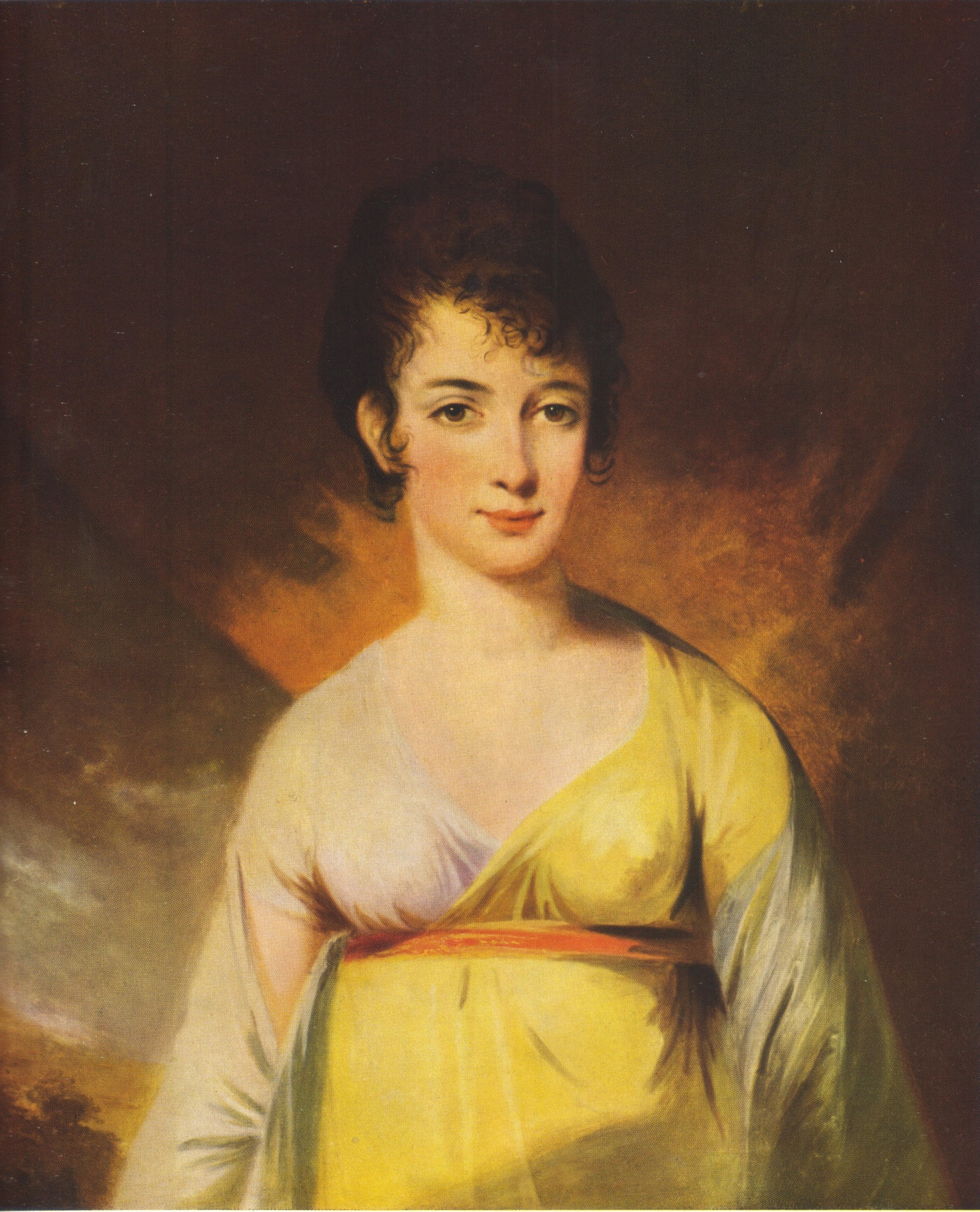
Martina von Schwerin by Carl Fredric von Breda.

Martina von Schwerin, née Martina Törngren (3 January 1789 in Gothenburg – 18 November 1875 in Gothenburg), was a Swedish Lady of letters, salonist and culture personality. She is known for her correspondence with A. S. de Cabre, Carl Gustaf von Brinkman and Esaias Tegnér, and has been called "Tegnérs biktmoder" (The Confessor of Tegnér). Martina von Schwerin was renowned in contemporary Sweden for her intellectual gifts and was referred to as "The Swedish Madame de Stael".

== Life ==
Martina von Schwerin was the daughter of the director of the Swedish East India Company, Martin Törngren and Eva Lovisa Svartlock, and married in 1805 to the courtier Baron Verner Gottlob von Schwerin. She had a daughter by the same name, Martina von Schwerin (1809–1839), who became a writer. Her marriage was arranged and unhappy, and she is described as patiently suffering.

Martina von Schwerin preferred the philosophy of Jean-Jacques Rousseau, although she was influenced by the enlightenment ideas of Nils von Rosenstein. She supported the romanticism, but one a bit more affected by the enlightenment era, a view supported by Goethe and Tegnér. Until the death of her spouse in 1840, she hosted a literary salon. She socialized in intellectual circles and met Germaine de Stael in 1813. She met Eaias Tegnér in 1816, with whom she developed a deep friendship, which from his side at least at one point developed into love. After the death of her spouse in 1840, she withdrew from social life and settled outside of Gothenburg - she also made several travels.

Her letters to Tegnér was published in "Ur Esaias Tegnérs papper" (From the papers of Esaias Tegnér) (1882), and "Martina von Schwerin, snillenas förtrogna" (Martina von Schwerin, the Confidante of Genius ones) (1912).

== Sources ==
- Nordisk familjebok / Uggleupplagan. 24. Ryssläder - Sekretär
- Theorell, Anita: Resa i tysta rum: okända svenska slottsbibliotek
