= Alfred Wahlberg =

Swedish landscape painter

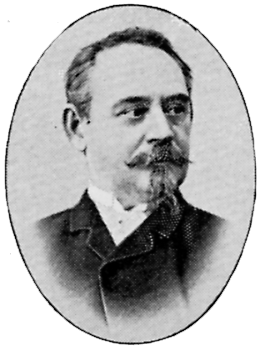
Alfred Wahlberg, from the Svenskt Porträttgalleri XX

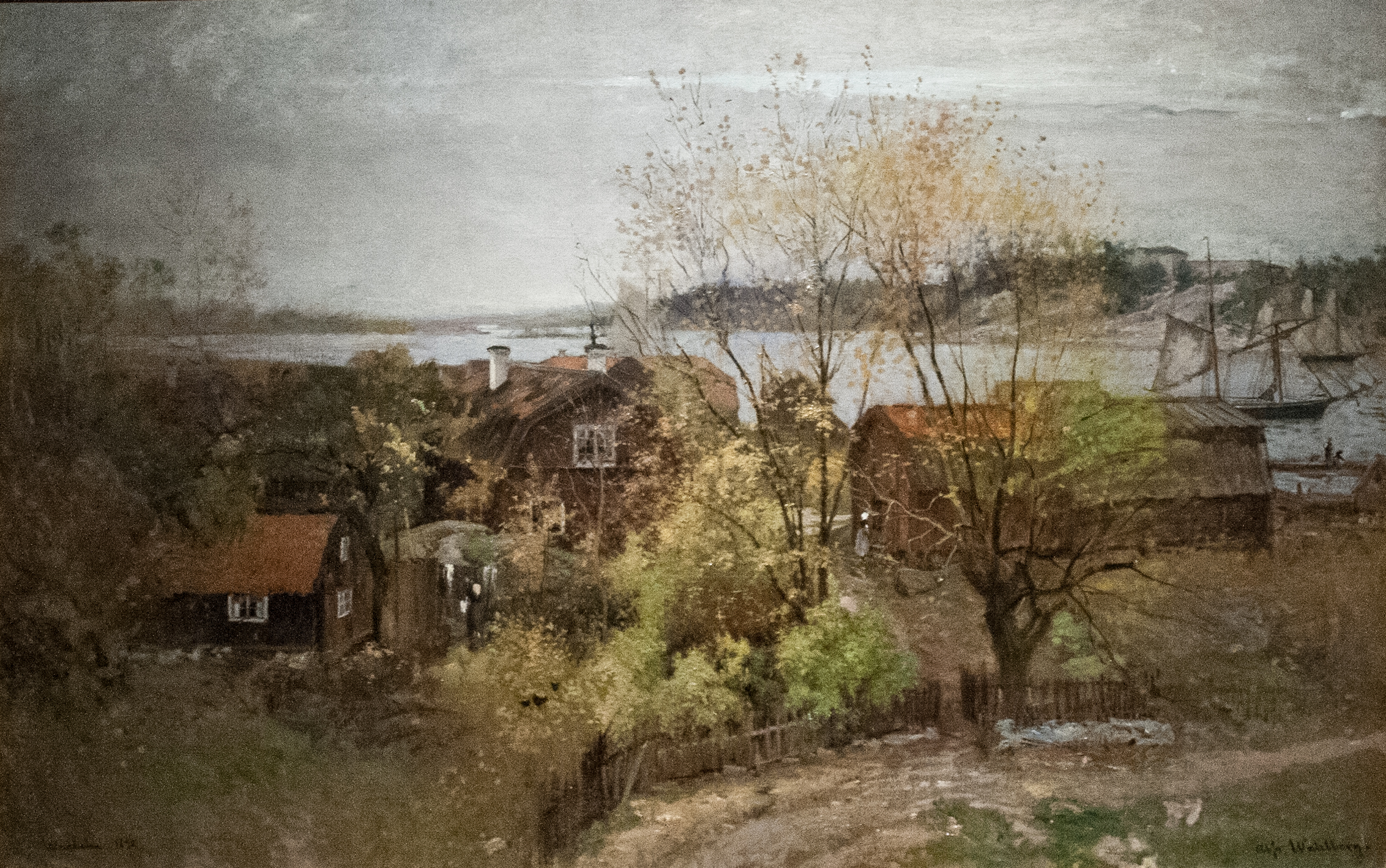
View Near Vaxholm (1872)

Herman Alfred Leonard Wahlberg (13 February 1834 – 4 October 1906) was a Swedish landscape painter.

== Early life ==
Alfred Wahlberg was born in Stockholm, Sweden. His father was a painter and his mother worked with carving. Wahlberg learned his father's profession as a child, but became a student at Royal Swedish Academy of Music after showing precocious musical talent. He studied piano and clarinet at the academy. After finishing his studies, Wahlberg joined the orchestra Göta gardes musikkår, and earned money (25–50 öre per hour) by giving piano lessons. He received preparatory education at the Royal Swedish Academy of Arts at the same time, although he never became a real student there.

== Career ==
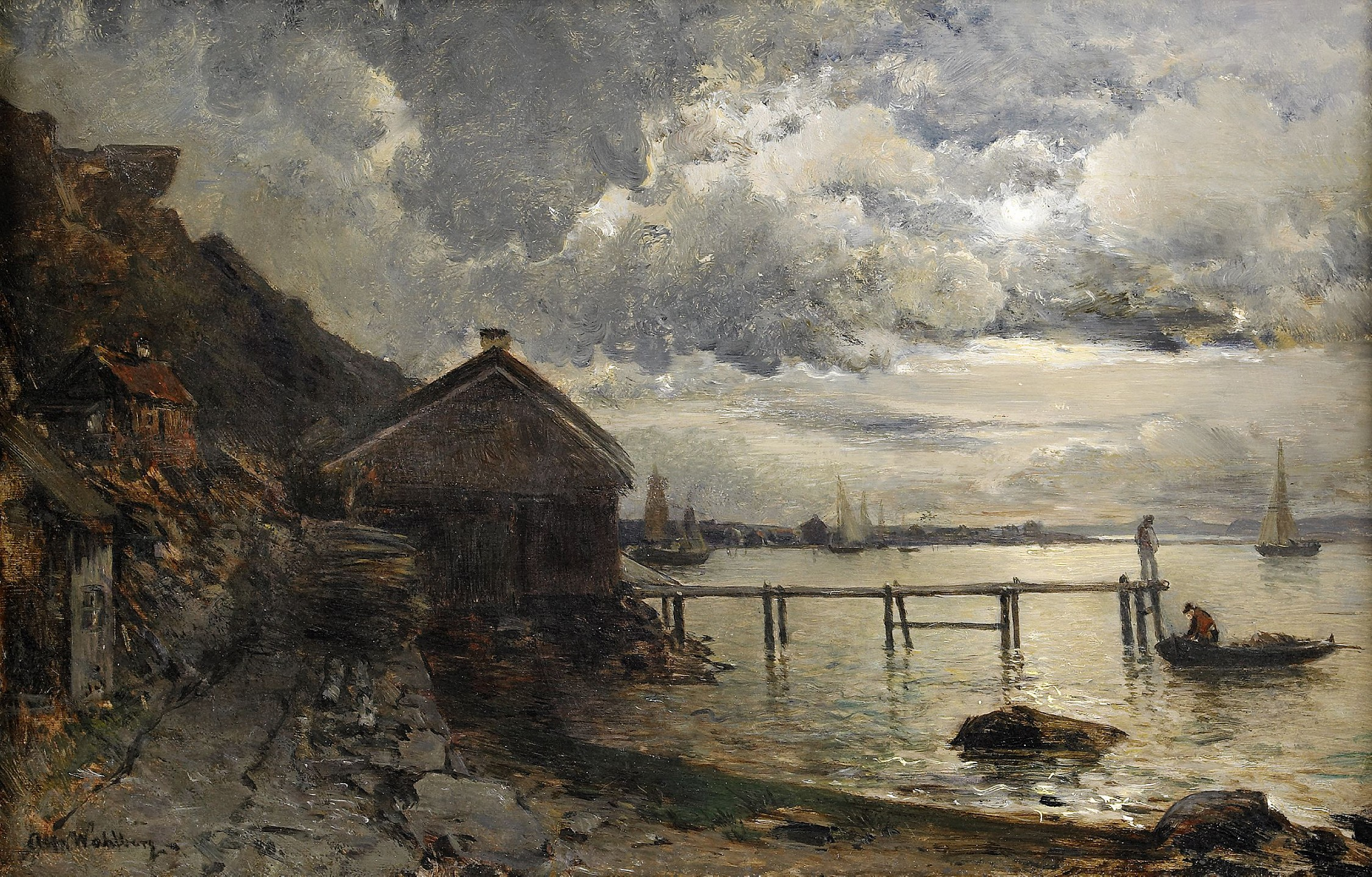
Moonlight, Fjällbacka (1880)

=== Early career ===
Wahlberg enjoyed painting and decided to pursue his father's profession. He started by drawing landscapes, and sold a painting for the first time in 1856 to the Swedish Association of Art (Sveriges Allmänna Konstförening).

In 1857, Wahlberg moved to the Kunstakademie Düsseldorf in Düsseldorf to train. He was a student of Hans Fredrik Gude for a short time, but made most of his paintings on his own. Wahlberg's paintings were sold either in Germany or to Konstföreningen in Sweden. Before returning to Stockholm in 1862, he made a trip to the Netherlands and Belgium to further his art studies. The most well-known paintings Wahlberg made while living in Düsseldorf are Solnedgång i Bohuslän and Vinterlandskap med björnjakt, both of which depict Swedish forest landscapes.

He returned to Stockholm in 1862 and painted Svenskt insjölandskap från Kolmården (1866), which became very famous and was displayed at the National Museum of Arts. After his return to Stockholm in 1862, Wahlberg painted Storm på holländska kusten (1863), Fors i svensk obygd (largely influenced by Andreas Achenbach), Borgruinen Niedeck vid Rhen (1863), Skogsparti från Särö (1865), Hörningsholm i månsken (1866), and Svenskt insjölandskap från Kolmården (1866). The latter is a carefully composed view of an infinite forest (Kolmården), a lake, and a summersky. The evening sky and the moonlight is depicted in mild, melting colors. The painting became very famous and was displayed at the National Museum of Arts. Although Wahlberg was still restricted by the limits of his technique, the painting was a large progress in his development as a painter.

=== Later career ===
Wahlberg moved to Paris in 1866 and displayed two paintings at the 1868 Paris Salon— both depicting a fishing place in Bohuslän; one of them takes place during the night and one during a sunset. These two paintings mark Wahlberg's transition from a Düsseldorf technique to a then modern French technique. He learned by ease the French school's technique and approach to studies, without imitating the well-known French painters.

Wahlberg earned success and was awarded with medals at the Paris Salon in 1870 and 1872; these included the Order of Vasa.

At the 1878 World's Fair in Paris, Wahlberg was recognized with a first class medal. Wahlberg was credited for bringing the then modern techniques of landscape art to Sweden. Almost every summer he made a short return to Sweden to study the nature in places such as Stockholm archipelago, Skåne, Halland, and Värmland. He died on 4 October 1906 in Tranås.

== Artistic Style ==
Wahlberg's fondness of romantic, dreaming, lyrical, and musical atmospheres is reflected in his paintings depicting the evening and the moonlight's play with tones and light. Among his most famous paintings from this period are Fiskläge vid bohuslänska kusten (1869, bought by Charles XV of Sweden), Utsikt i Södermanland (view of a meadow and a lake in Södermanland, 1870), Landskap i månsken (landscape in moonlight, 1870), Månsken från södra Frankrike (moonlight in southern France, 1870), Nääs (a summer evening, 1871), I Vaxholm (an autumn day in Vaxholm, 1872), I Fontainebleauskogen (Fontainebleau forest, 1874), Maj i Nizza (May in Nice, 1878), Afton på Hallands Väderö (evening at an island, 1880), Fjällbacka (moonlight, 1881), and Svensk björkhage (1882).

Wahlberg's work from the late 1880s and forward includes Stockholms ström (1888), Månsken på Hallands Väderö (1889), Oktobernatt (1893), Popplar (1893), Sol på snö i Marstrand (1901), and Svensk sommarnatt (1901).

== Gallery ==
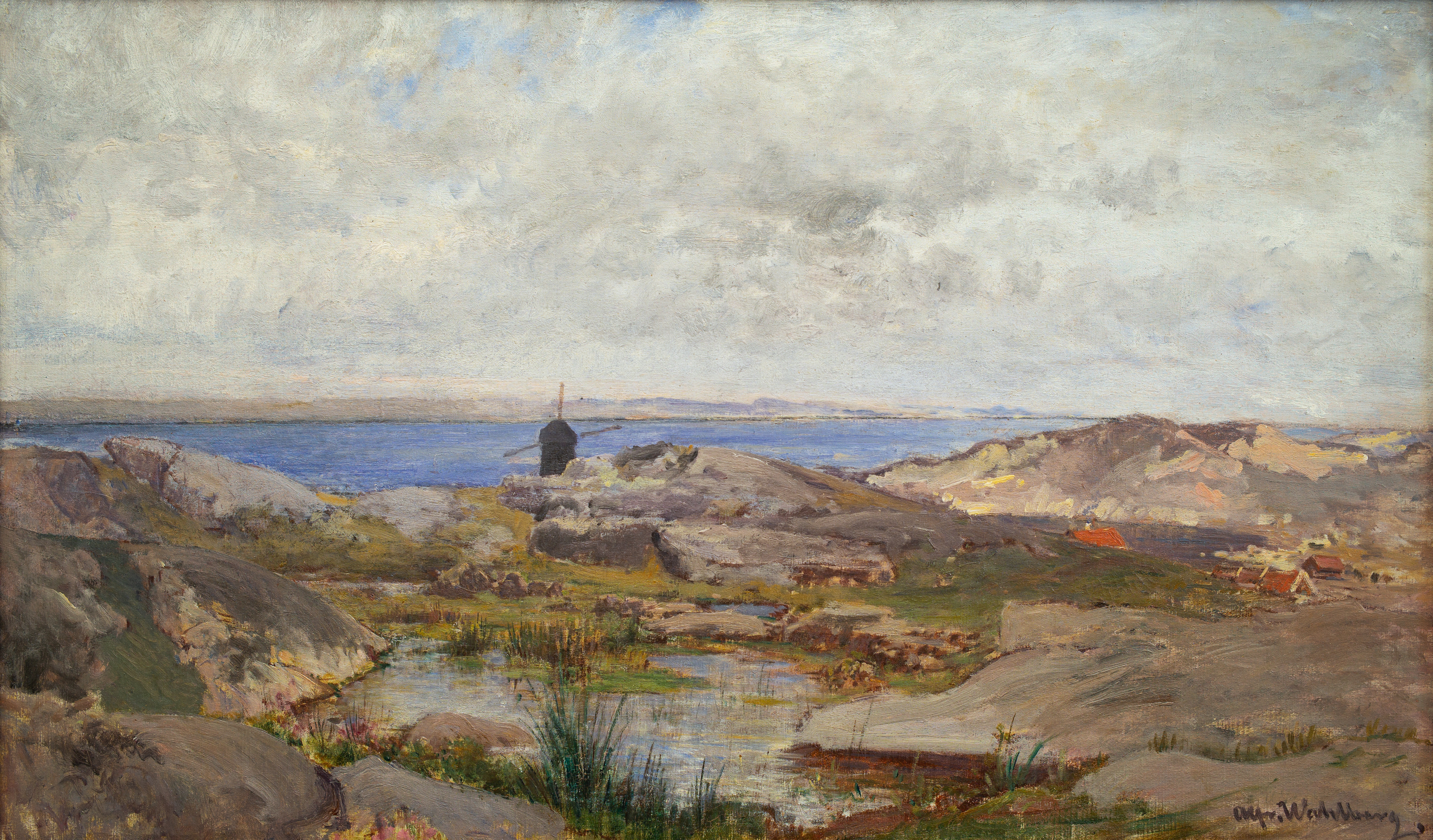
Summer Day at the West Coast of Sweden

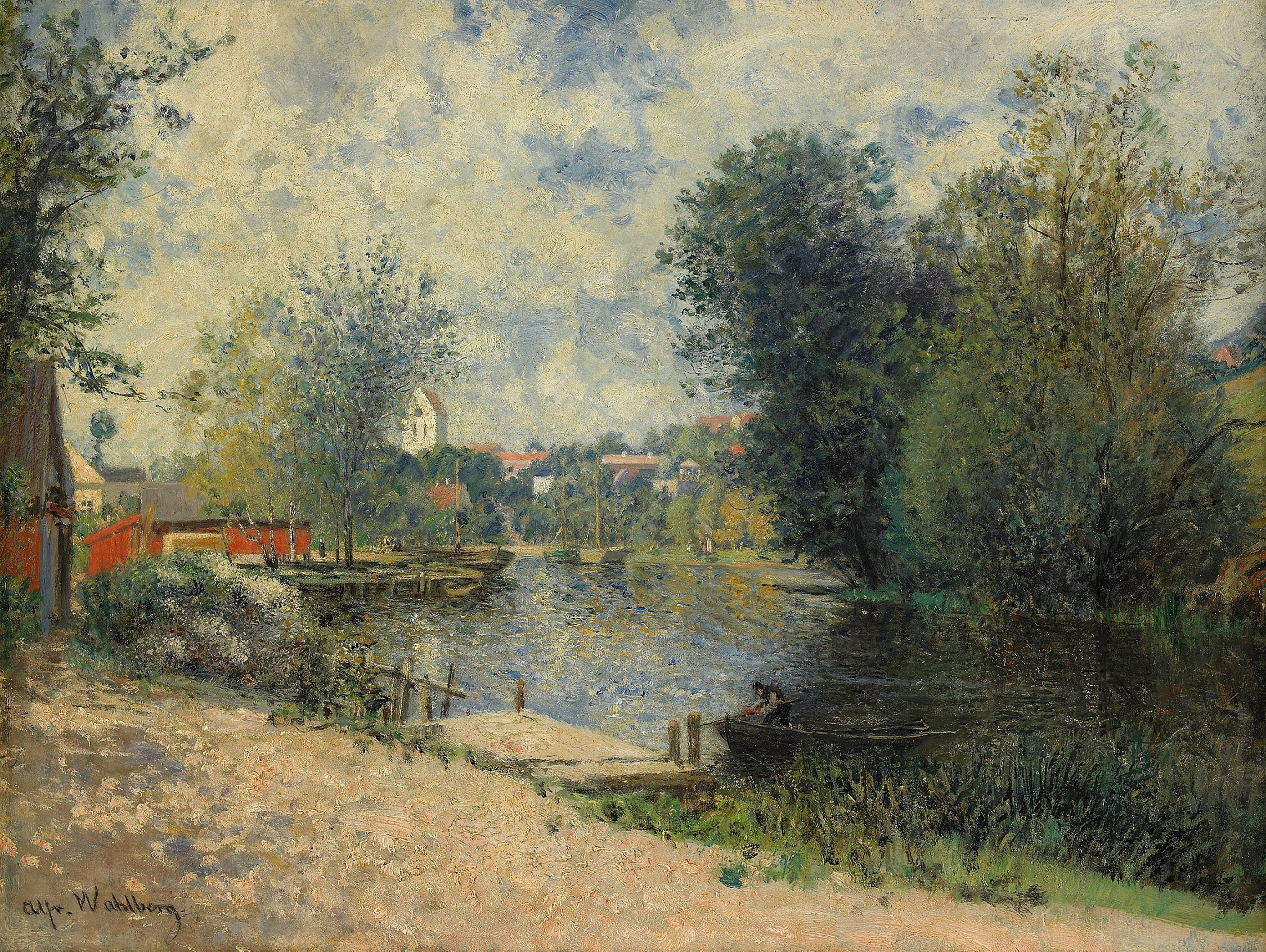
Summer landscape - motif from Ronneby

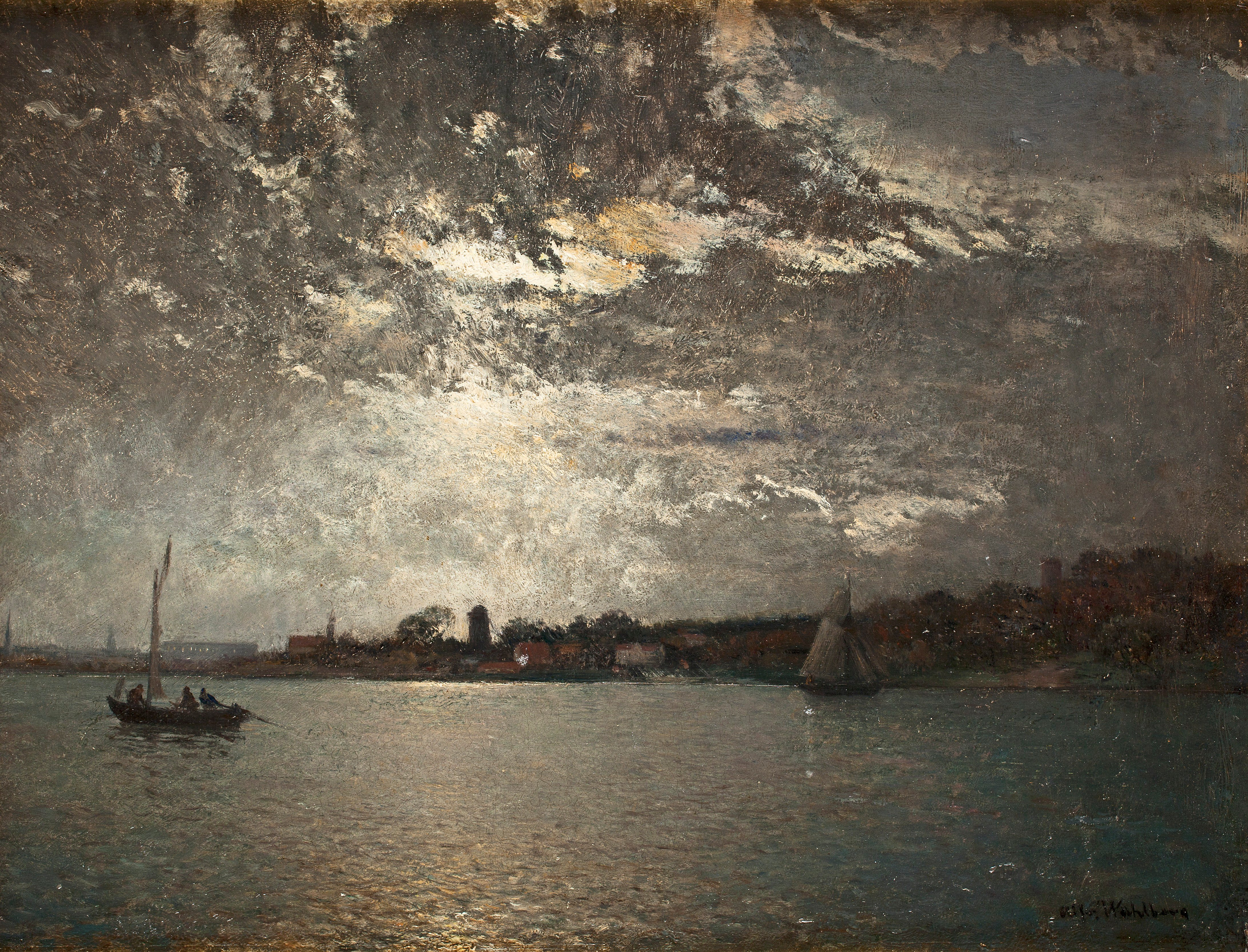
Moonlight mood, Stockholm's inlet

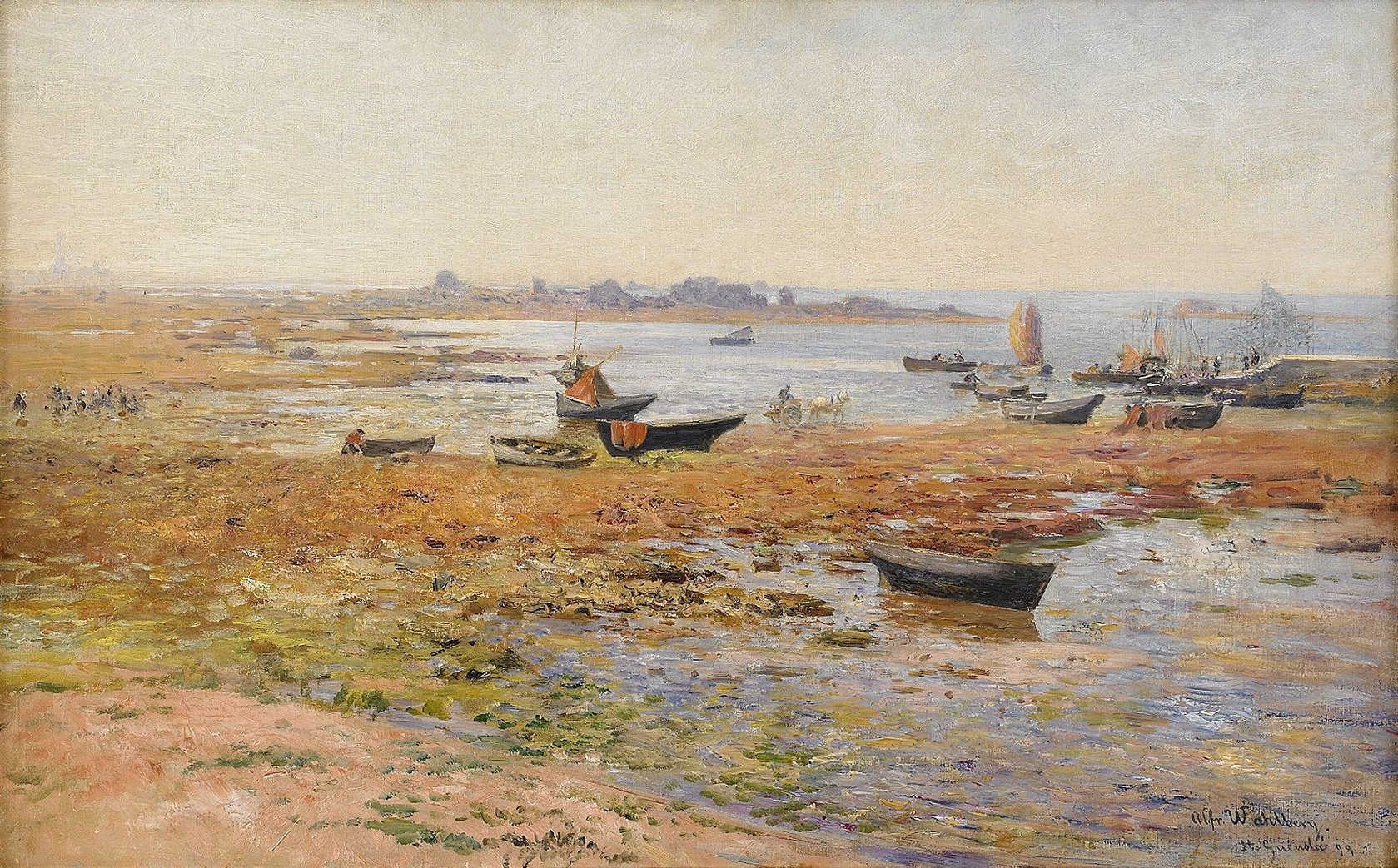
Fishing Boats at Saint Guénolé
