= Charlotta Cedercreutz =

Swedish artist (1736–1815)

Maria Charlotta Wrangel
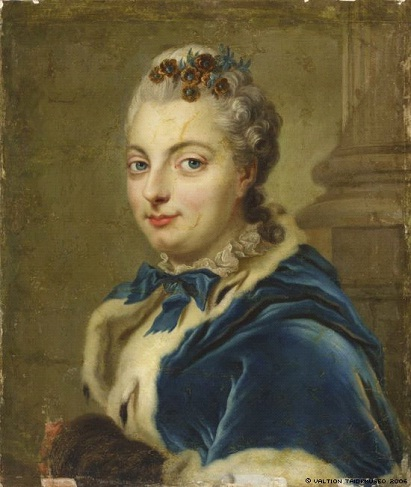
- Portrait of Maria Charlotta Wrangel (1736-1815), Swedish painter by Johan Joachim Streng
- Born: Maria Charlotta Cedercreutz; 1736
- Died: 1815 (aged 78–79); Stockholm, Sweden
- Spouse: Georg Gustaf Wrangel (m. 1770)

Maria Charlotta Cedercreutz, married surname Wrangel (1736–1815), was a Swedish artist, lady-in-waiting and baroness. She was a member of the Royal Swedish Academy of Arts.

Her parents were the courtier Baron Lars Cedercreutz and Catharina Siljeström. Despite the fact that her beauty and fortune made her an attractive match, she is said to have dislike the thought of marriage and refused to marry for many years. She was married in 1770 to General Major Baron Georg Gustaf Wrangel af Adinal. From 1774, she was one of the six head ladies in waiting of the court of the Queen, Sophia Magdalena of Denmark. A talented Dilettante artist, she was inducted into the Royal Academy of Arts.

At court, she was described as intelligent and cultivated but also very coquettish and particular about rank and attention, and it was said that she participated with eager in the pleasures and intrigues of the court. At least for a period, she played an important part in the royal court: she is frequently mentioned in the memoirs of the time and was the target of two caricatures by Johan Frederik von Nolcke: »La mère comme il y en a point Lionnopolis 1789» and »Meren désenchantée ou la naissance de Lion. Stockholm 1790». She lost her position at court in 1795 and was at that time described as destitute: Princess Hedwig Elizabeth Charlotte therefore asked permission for her to be given an appartement at the Royal Palace.

Charlotta died in Stockholm.
