= Timrå Church =

Coordinates: 62.4763°N 17.3154°E

- Timrå kyrka
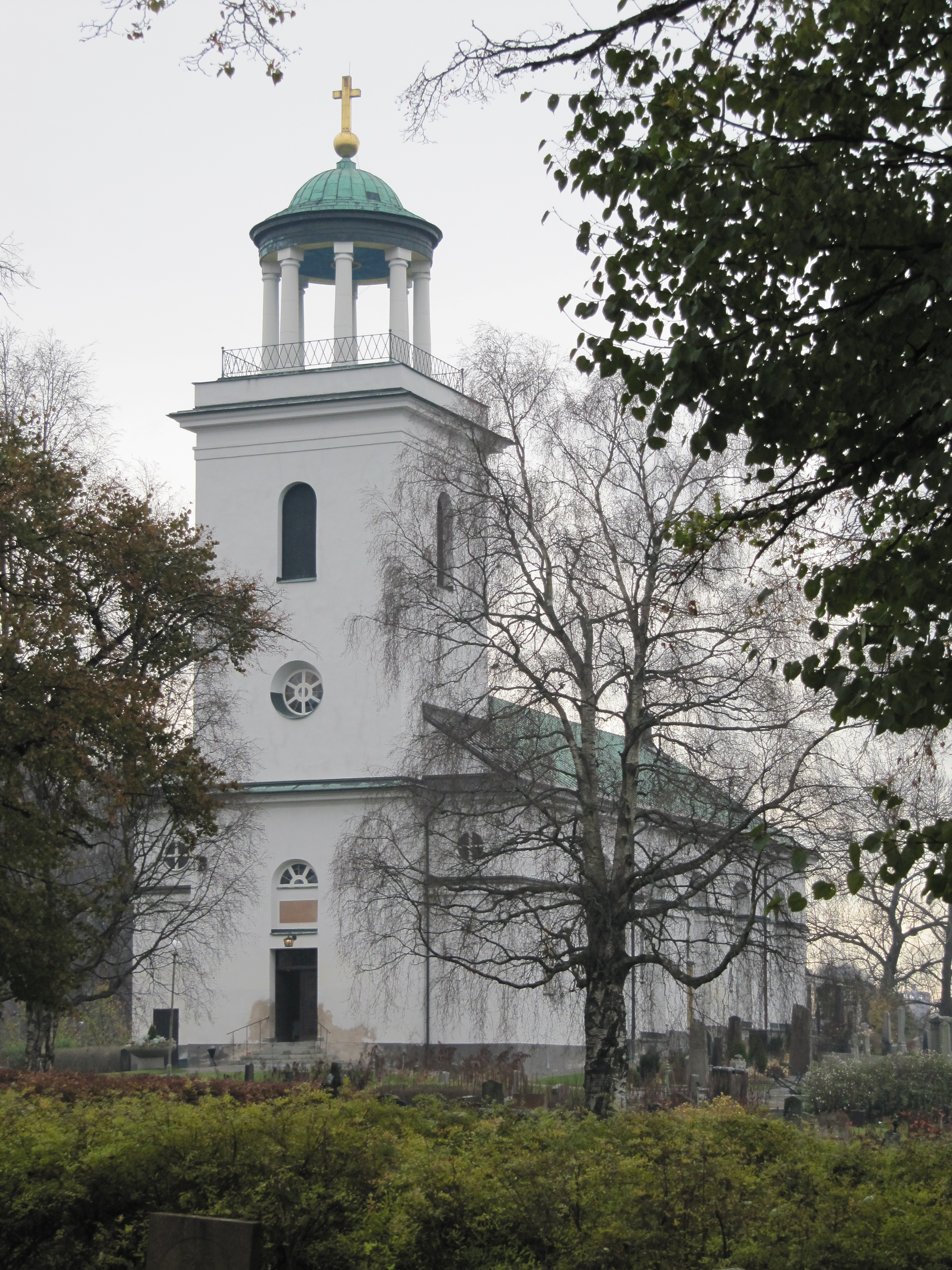
- Timrå Church in October 2011
- Timrå Church
- Location: Timrå
- Country: Sweden
- Denomination: Church of Sweden

History
- Consecrated: 16 October 1796

Administration
- Diocese: Härnösand
- Parish: Timrå

The Timrå Church (Swedish: Timrå kyrka) is a church building in Östrand in Timrå, Sweden. Belonging to the Timrå Parish of the Church of Sweden, it was inaugurated on 16 October 1796.
