= Adolf Hedin =

Swedish newspaper publisher, writer and politician

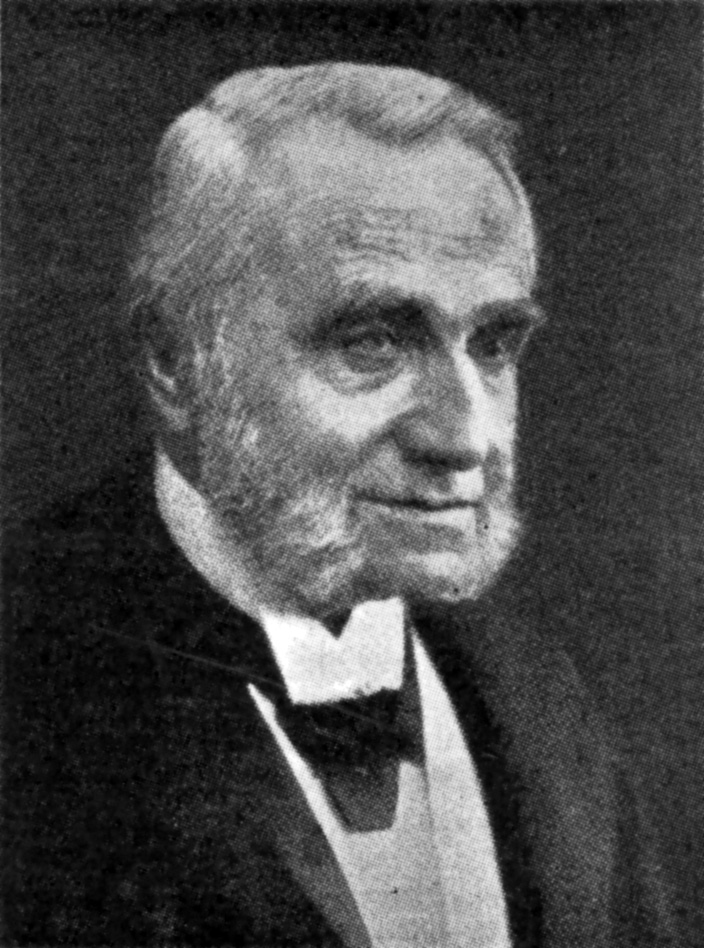
Adolf Hedin

Sven Adolf Hedin (23 April 1834 – 20 September 1905) was a Swedish newspaper publisher, writer and politician. He was known for his advocacy for democratic and social reforms.

== Biography ==
Hedin was born in Bo Parish (now part of Hallsberg Municipality) in Örebro County, Sweden. He was the son of vicar Johan Gustaf Hedin and Beata Elisabeth Vesterberg. He earned a B.A. from Uppsala University in 1861 and worked thereafter as a critic for Upsala-Posten. In 1864 he moved to Stockholm to work as a publisher for several newspapers. He worked for some time at Dagens Nyheter and was the executive editor of Aftonbladet from 1874 to 1876.

In 1870 Hedin was elected a member of the lower house of the Swedish parliament. He continued as a Member of Parliament until his death, with the exception for the years 1874 to 1876 (when he was editor of Aftonbladet) and 1888. During the 1870s, Hedin argued for universal suffrage and military conscription.

In foreign policy, Hedin was known for his support for Scandinavism. He initially supported the Swedish-Norwegian union. However, at the union crisis in 1905 he supported the Norwegian demands for independence and in his last public statement he urged for a peaceful resolution to the conflict.

== Other sources ==
- Kihlberg, Leif (1972) Folktribunen Adolf Hedin: för frihet och rättvisa åt menige man (Stockholm: Bonnier) ISBN 91-0-020015-8
