= Kjell Waltman =

Swedish actor

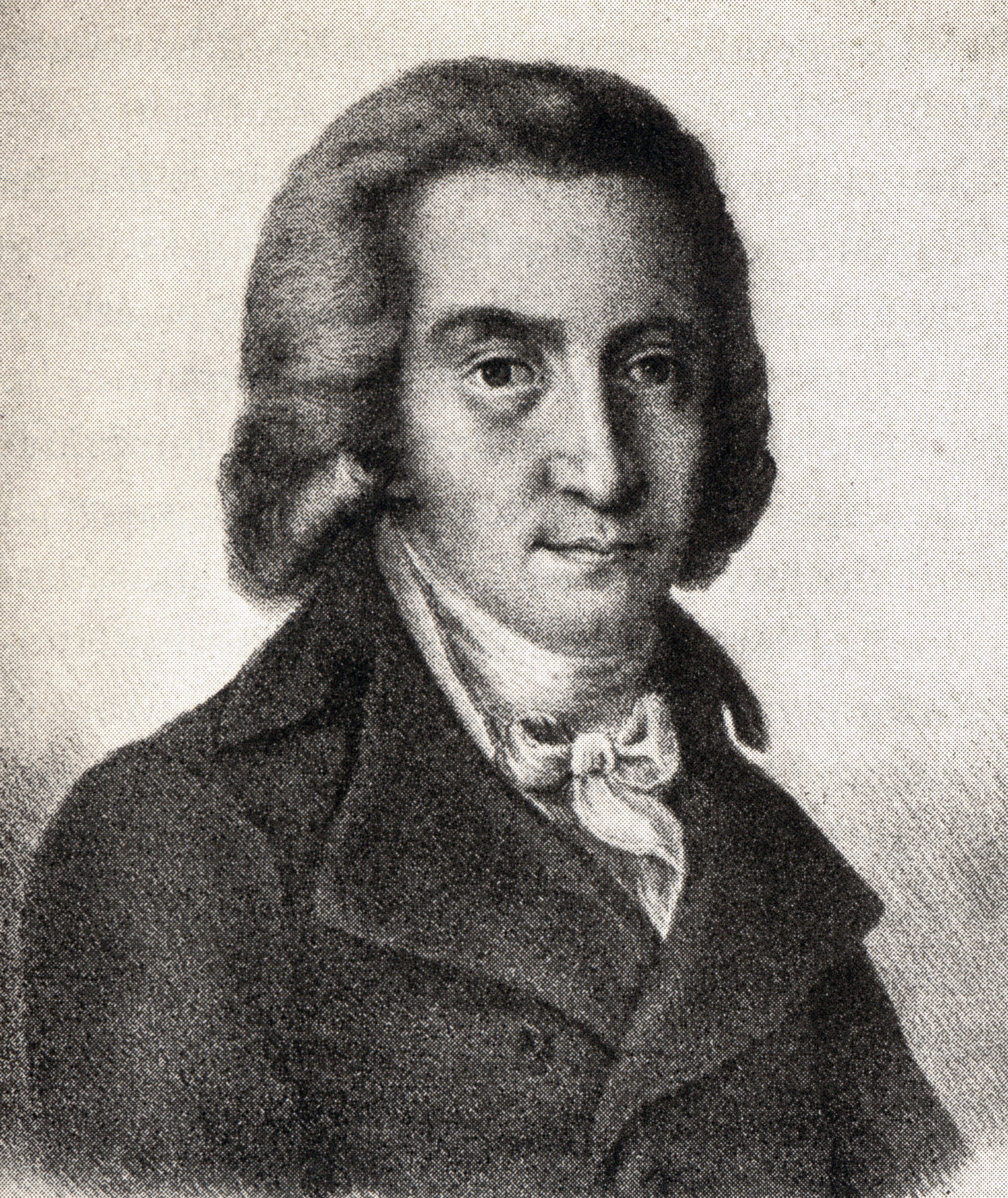
Kjell Waltman.

Kjell Waltman (April 28, 1758 - May 07, 1799) was a Swedish stage actor.

== Biography ==
Kjell Christian Adolf Waltman belonged to the elite of the pioneer generation actors of the Royal Dramatic Theatre, where he was engaged in 1788-99. He was employed at the Comediehuset in Gothenborg in 1780-85 before making his Stockholm debut at the Stenborg Theatre in 1785. He was employed at the Royal Dramatic Theatre after having been noted by King Gustav III of Sweden. Waltman was described as a versatile actor able to play most roles convincingly (not a given thing for an actor in an epoch when most actors specialized in playing a certain type of role) and praised for his expressive mimic, though he was most noted for his comical parts.

He was married to Maria Elisabeth Uppman (1768-1852).

== Other sources ==
- Nordensvan, Georg, Svensk teater och svenska skådespelare från Gustav III till våra dagar. Förra delen, 1772-1842, Bonnier, Stockholm, 1917
