= Charlotta Löfgren =

Swedish lady of letters and poet

Charlotta Catharina Löfgren (January 1720 – 14 February 1784) was a Swedish lady of letters and poet.

== Biography ==
Löfgren was born in Linköping, the daughter of the local official Anders Löfgréen (d. 1728) and Anna Schreibe. She was the sister of the poet Henrik Anders Löfgren. She married in 1738 to the vicar Petrus Lagerman (1706–1790), who occasionally wrote poems as well. She lived in Norrköping from 1746, where she was a local literary celebrity and wrote poems for festive public occasions.

Löfgren was published both in name and anonymously, which means that a significant amount of her poems are unidentified. She is believed to be the author "C.C.L", who published numerous poems in the period of 1742–1764. Most of her poems describe individual women, and in one poem from 1748, she makes herself the spokesperson of women and salutes Pagan Roman gods. Her correspondence, partially written in verse, with Hedvig Charlotta Nordenflycht, Hedvig Löfwenskiöld, Hedwig Walldorff finns and her brother Henrik Anders Löfgren, has been preserved.

Löfgren has been identified with the pseudonym Climene, to whom Hedvig Charlotta Nordenflycht addresses a poem in the form of a letter from 1759, which is counted as a sketch to the latter famous feminist poem Fruentimrets försvar (The Defense of Women), where Nordenflycht defense the intellectual capability of females and states that intellectual inferiority is caused by the lack of education and knowledge rather than the natural effect of gender. Nordenflycht was enthusiastic in her ambition to encourage literary talent in other females, and was reportedly happy about the female collective of writers in Norrköping, which consisted of Löfgren, Hedvig Löfwenskiöld, Hedwig Walldorff and Margareta Gryzell.
