= Knut Beckeman =

Swedish architect

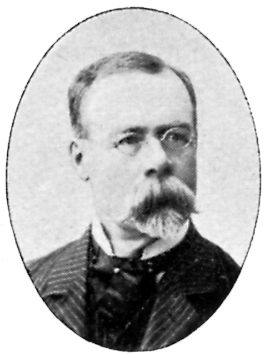
Knut Beckeman

Knut Wilhelm Malcolm Beckeman (13 October 1851 – 1943) was a Swedish architect.

Beckeman was born in Halmstad, Sweden. He was a student at Chalmers University of Technology in Gothenburg between 1868 and 1972. He then studied architecture at Royal Danish Academy of Fine Arts in Copenhagen between 1978 and 1881. He started working for several architect firms in Stockholm, Uppsala and Gothenburg. He became city architect in Uppsala between 1884 and 1890.

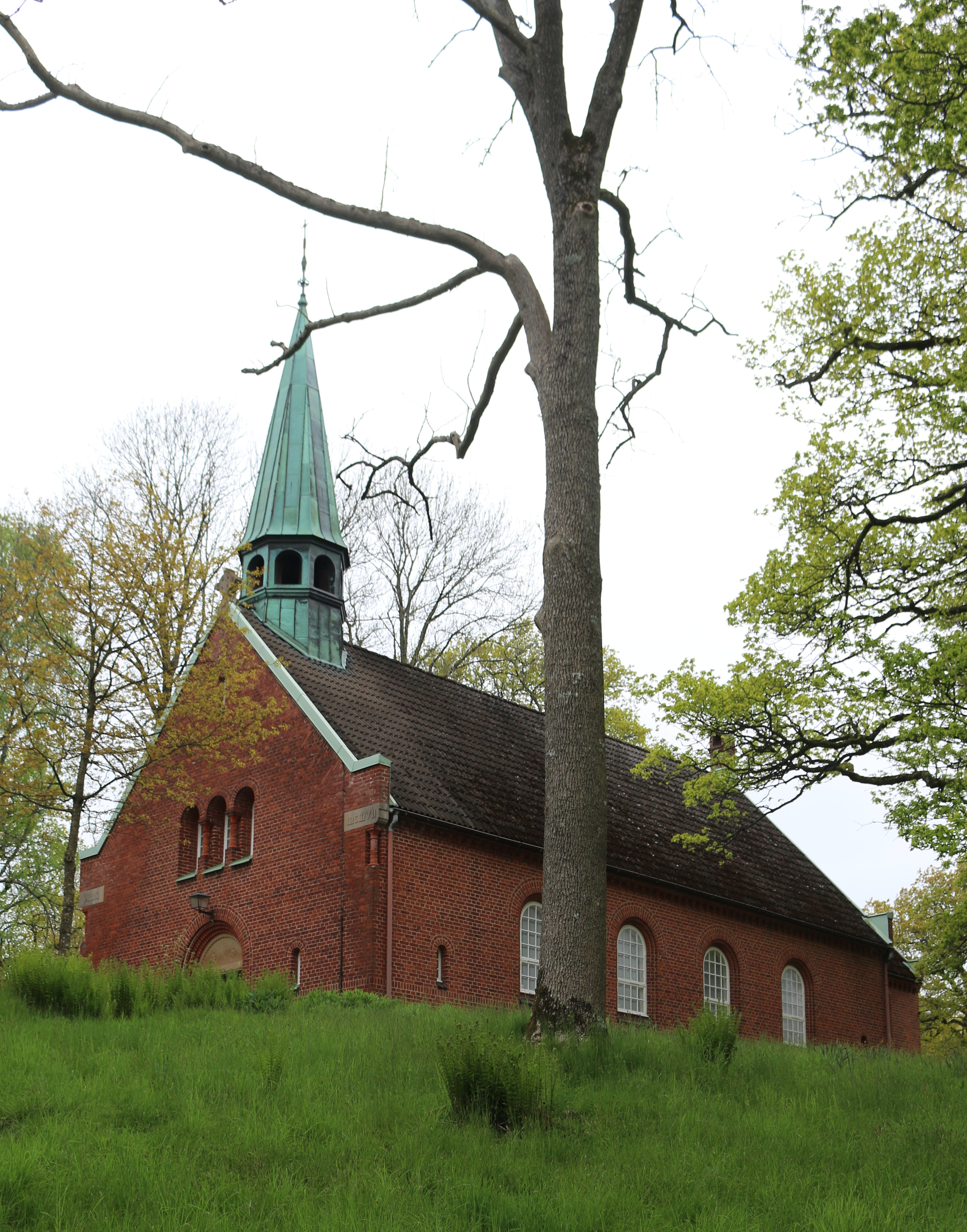
Sperlingsholm church
