= Gustafva Lindskog =

Swedish athlete

Gustafva "Stafva" Carolina Lindskog (1794–1851), was a Swedish athlete. She was a pioneer in the field of physical education of women in Sweden, and likely the first female teacher in physical education in the country.

== Biography ==
Lindskog was the great granddaughter of merchant Gustaf Lindskog from Stockholm. In 1818, she was appointed instructor in the first class of physical education for women, as the head of the gymnastic for women at the Royal Central Gymnastics Institute. Formally, she was not referred to as an instructor and teacher but merely as replacement for the male teacher P H Ling and called "Movement Giver". It was not until 1849 that she was formally given the title of ordinary teacher at the institute. This was one year after the first woman, Greta Stina Bohm, had become a master of swimming, followed by the pioneer Nancy Edberg. Lindskog was the first woman to be employed by the state as a teacher and instructor in Physical therapy. She was succeeded in her position by her pupil Hildur Ling in 1851.
