= Hedvig Löfwenskiöld =

Hedvig Apollonia Löfwenskiöld (later Lillienanckar; 1736–1789) was a Swedish writer and poet.

== Life ==
She was the daughter of the official and poet Henrik Anders Löfvenskiöld and the niece of the poet Charlotta Löfgren. The correspondence between her and her colleagues Charlotta Löfgren, Samuel Älf and Hedwig Walldorff is preserved. She was a member of the literary society Apollini Sacra, a daughter academy of the Utile Dulci.

In one poem, she states that the intellectual inferiority of females was the consequence of the lack of education and knowledge and that given the same schooling, the intellect of the genders would be equal.
