= 1796 in Sweden =

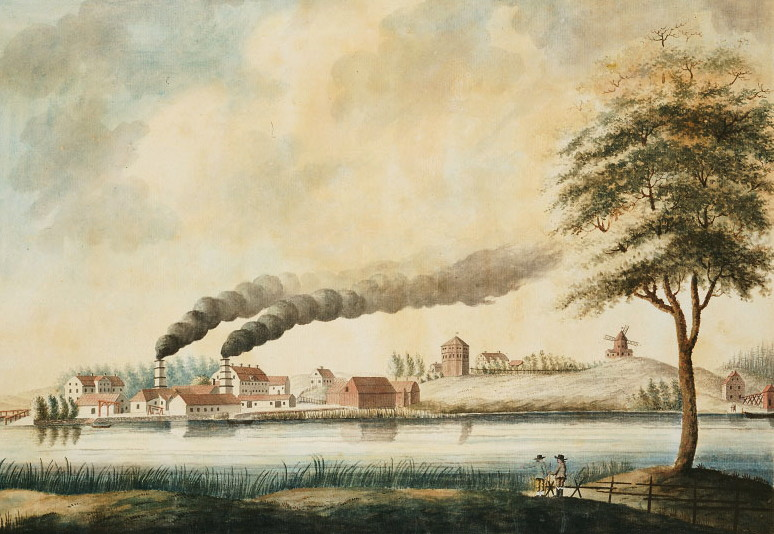
J.G. Meijer Bergsund 1796

Events from the year 1796 in Sweden

== Incumbents ==
- Monarch – Gustav IV Adolf

== Events ==
- September - The King visits the Imperial court of Catherine the Great in Saint Petersburg in Russia to be engaged to Grand Duchess Alexandra Pavlovna of Russia. He discontinues the plans when told that she will not be required to convert to Lutheranism.
- 16 October: The Church of Sweden Timrå Church is inaugurated.
- 1 November - King Gustav IV Adolf is declared of age and the guardian government of Duke Charles is dissolved.
- - Norrköping jungfrustift is dissolved.
- 12 November - Royal Swedish Academy of War Sciences is founded by Gustaf Wilhelm af Tibell, originally named the "Swedish Warman Society".

== Births ==
- 23 July – Franz Berwald, composer (died 1868)
- 3 September – Henriette Widerberg, opera primadonna (died 1872)
- - Anna Elisabeth Hartwick, lace industrialist (died 1882)

== Deaths ==
- 17 March – Carl Fredrik Adelcrantz, architect and civil servant (born 1716)
- 12 November – Margareta Christina Giers, painter (born 1731)
