= Margaretha Heijkenskjöld =

Margaretha Charlotta Heijkensköld (19 August 1781 – 29 July 1834, Remla, Syria), was a Swedish traveler and a dress reformer. She attracted a lot of attention from her contemporaries by her journeys.

Margaretha Heijkensköld was the daughter of the noble Councillor Detlof Heijkensköld the Younger (1751–1824) and Lovisa Ulrica Victorin (1756-1825). Late in life, she inherited a fortune, which she used to finance her interest in foreign travel and the study of foreign culture. She was described as an independent person with a great ability to adapt. She never married, and the fact that she traveled, and traveled alone, in a period when women seldom did the first and never the second, drew a lot of attention. She visited Paris, Vienna and Italy before she traveled in the Middle East. She died in Romla in Syria after a visit in Jerusalem. Notes and drawings from her travels are preserved.

In 1816 Margaretha Heijkenskjöld introduced a new Folk costume, the so-called Hälleforsdräkten on her father's initiative, to "curb the luxury and benefit social equality".
