= 1762 in Sweden =

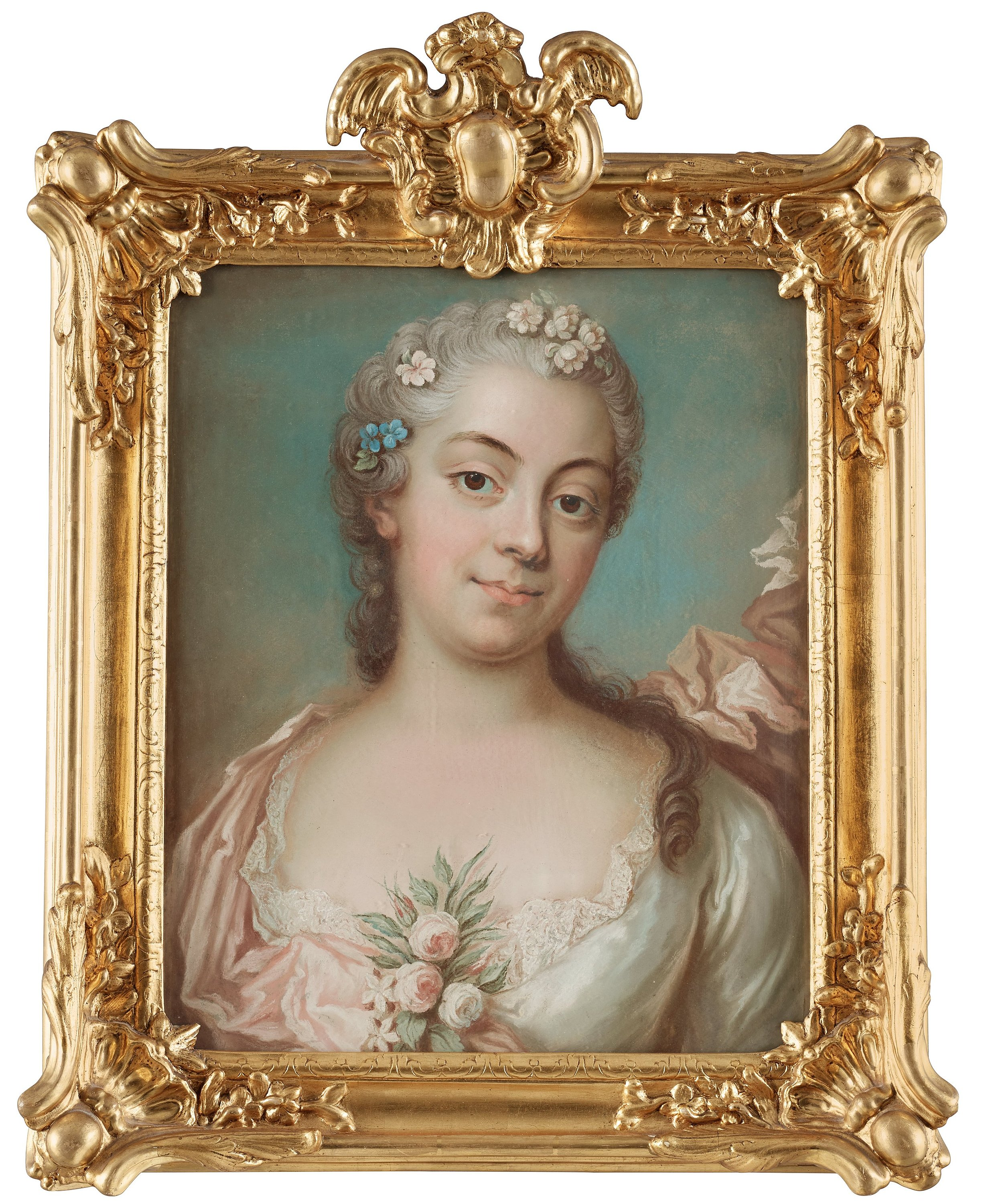
Christina von Heidenstam

Events from the year 1762 in Sweden

== Incumbents ==
- Monarch – Adolf Frederick

== Events ==
- 22 May - Treaty of Hamburg (1762). Peace between Sweden and Prussia with the mediation of the Queen of Sweden, Louisa Ulrika of Prussia. This was the end of the Seven Years War.
- 25 August – The first Drottningholm Palace Theatre burns down.
- The Hats lose political power in Sweden due to admitting defeat in the Seven Years War
- Elisabeth Christina von Linné publishes her discovery of the Tropaeolum majus.
- Menniskans elände, by Gustaf Fredrik Gyllenborg

== Births ==
- 7 October - Fabian von Fersen (1762–1818), official and courtier (died 1818)
- - Christina Fredenheim, vocalist (died 1841)

== Deaths ==
- - Charles Langlois, actor and theater director (died 1692)
