= Gustafva Björklund =

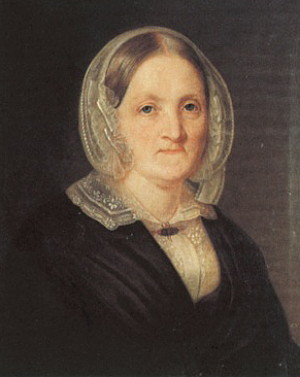
Gustafva Björklund

Gustafva Björklund (1794–1862) was a Swedish cookery book-author and restaurant owner.

== Biography ==
Björklund was originally from Finland, but moved to Sweden as a child, and worked as a domestic and waitress on several locations. In 1833, she was employed as a waitress at the gentlemen's club Lilla Sällskapet in Stockholm, and when it was dissolved in 1840, she took it over and managed it herself until 1851, during which time it was one of the most popular restaurants for the capital's upper classes. After 1851, she managed more humble establishments, and supported herself by renting out rooms.

In 1847, she published her cookery book Kokbok, which became a success and was reprinted in several editions and was followed by additional works in cookery, such as the Kok-bok för tjenare och tarfliga hushåll (1851). She was referred to as an authority by others in the same field of knowledge in Sweden in the same century.

Björklund was described as a beauty. She never married, but had a son, Gustav Reinhold (1817–?) with her employer Otto Reinhold Hammerfeldt, as well as two daughters by unknown fathers: Lovisa Elisabeth (1824–?) and Henrietta Gustava (1825–1886), with the patronymic Karlsson (Issue of Charles). There are indications, such as funds given to her from the royal court, that her daughters' biological father was Charles XIV John of Sweden.

== Bibliography ==
- Per Erik Wahlund: Demoiselle – Kokboksutgiverskan och restauratrisen Gustava Björklunds liv och verksamhet, Växjö (?), 1991.
