= 1778 in Sweden =

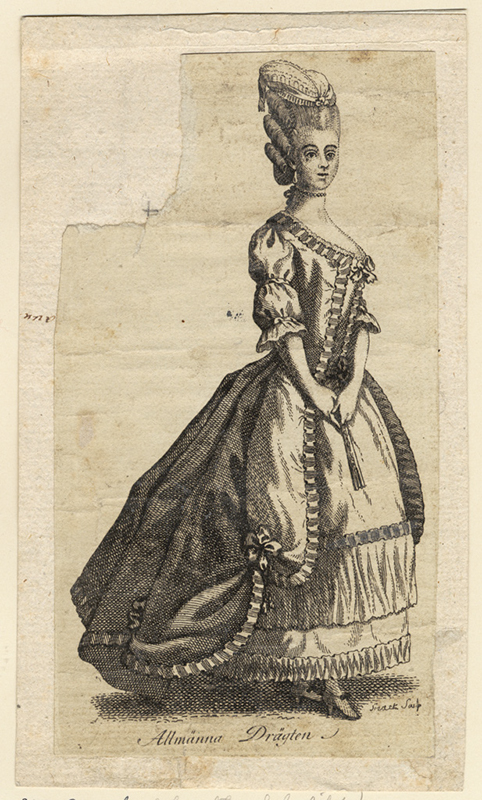
The original feminine version of the Nationella dräkten, from 1780. Engraving by Johan Snack

Events from the year 1778 in Sweden

== Incumbents ==
- Monarch – Gustav III
- King's Consort - Sofia Magdalena

== Events ==
- April - The king introduces the costume reform Nationella dräkten to give the population a standard costume to wear and thereby avoid the great waste of clothing. In reality, however, the costume comes to be worn only as a court costume.
- 20 October - First issue of Stockholms-Posten
- Capital punishment in Sweden is abolished for infanticide, rape, adultery, bigamy, witchcraft and repeated theft.
- Infanticide Act (Barnamordsplakatet) secures the right to anonymity for, and bans persecution of, unwed mothers to protect them from the social stigma which could cause infanticide.
- The pregnancy of Queen Sophia Magdalena is announced after twelve years of childless marriage for the royal couple. The Queen Dowager is involved in supporting rumors that Adolf Fredrik Munck is the real father, resulting in a court scandal. The Munck affair ends with the Queen Dowager forced to officially retract her support for such rumors.

== Births ==
- 30 April - Arvid David Hummel, entomologist (died 1836)
- 1 November - King Gustav IV Adolf
- Wilhelmina Krafft, painter (died 1828)
- Carolina Kuhlman, actress (died 1866)
- Aurora Wilhelmina Koskull, salonist (died 1852)

== Deaths ==
- 10 January – Carl Linnaeus, botanist, zoologist and physician (born 1707)
