= 1781 in Sweden =

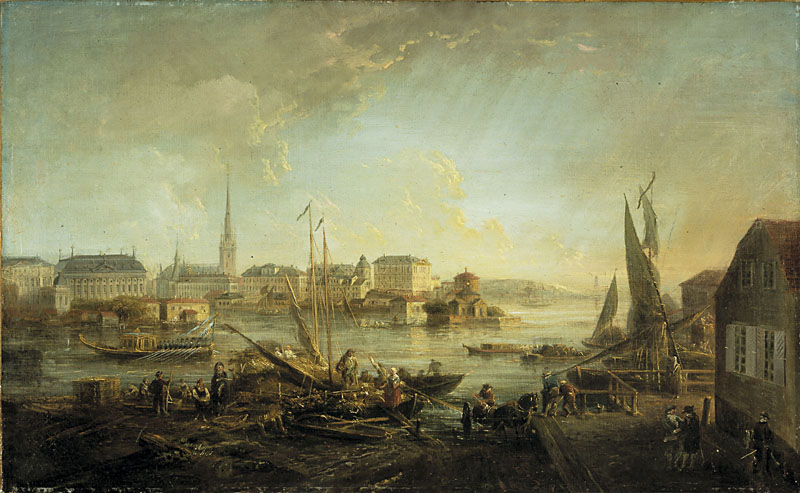
Rödbotorget 1780

Events from the year 1781 in Sweden

== Incumbents ==
- Monarch – Gustav III

== Events ==
- 24 January - Tolerance Act (Sweden)
- - The French Theater of Gustav III is composed and inaugurated.
- - Min son på galejan by Jacob Wallenberg.
- - Passionerna by Thomas Thorild.

== Births ==
- February 19 - Adolf Zethelius, silversmith, industrialist (died 1864)
- 19 August - Margaretha Heijkenskjöld, traveler and dress reformer (died 1834)
- 26 September – Carl Fredrik af Wingård, politician and Lutheran clergyman (died 1851)
- - Anna Maria Thalén, Swedish fashion trader (died 1851)

== Deaths ==
- 21 December - Johan Henrik Scheffel, artist (born 1690)
- 12 September - Catharina Ebba Horn, royal mistress (born 1720)
