= 1791 in Sweden =

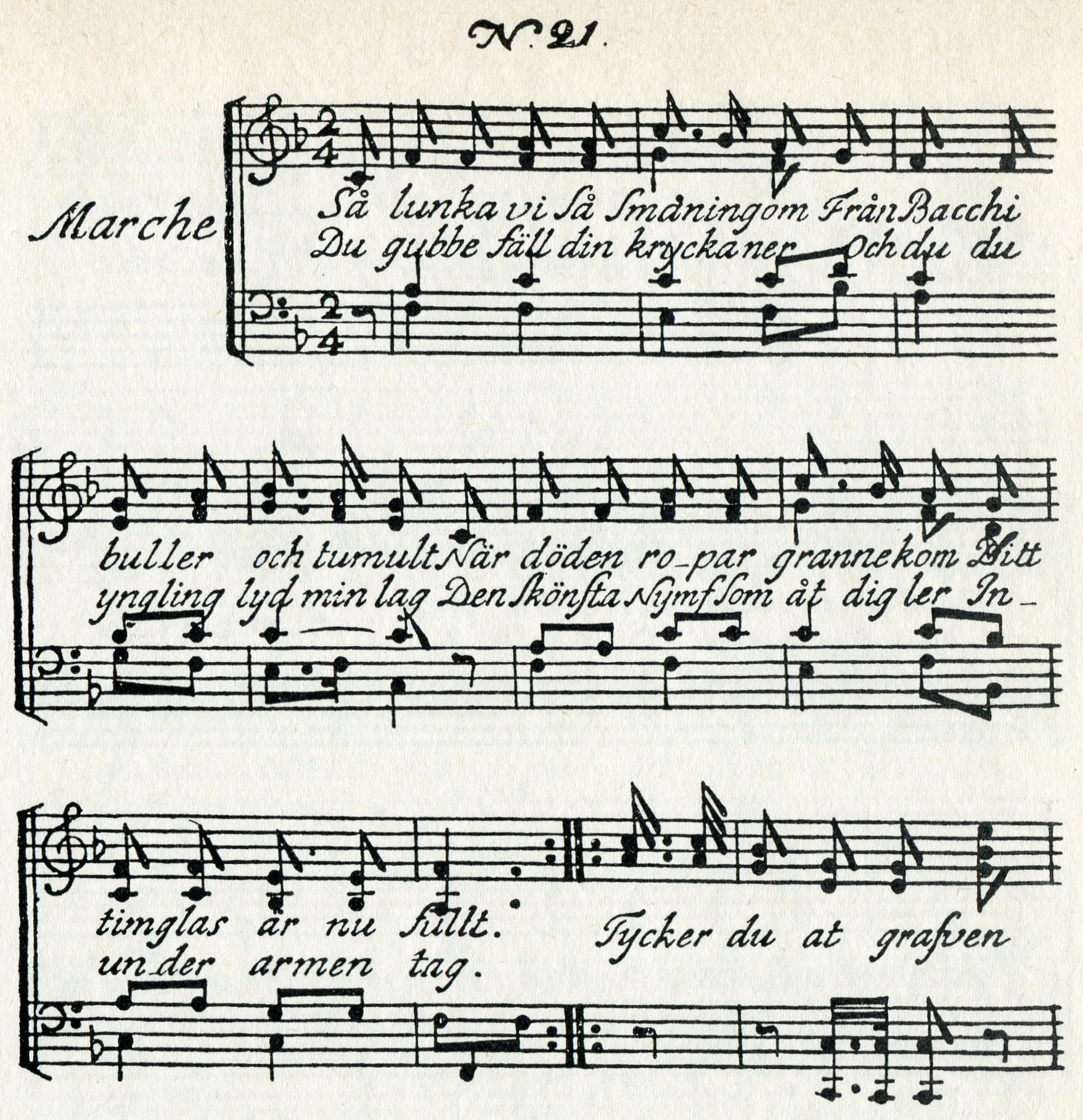

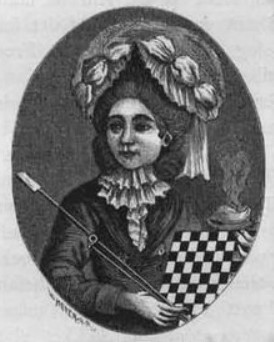
Maja-Lisa Borgman

Events from the year 1791 in Sweden

== Incumbents ==
- Monarch – Gustav III

== Events ==
- Inauguration of the Bergianska trädgården
- Creation of the Ministry for Foreign Affairs (Sweden)
- En critik öfver critiker by Thomas Thorild.
- Fredmans sånger by Carl Michael Bellman.
- Dumboms lefverne by Johan Henric Kellgren.
- Creation of the court-martial of appeal in Stockholm.
- Treaty of Drottningholm was signed between Sweden and Russia.

== Births ==
- 29 June – Charlotta Skjöldebrand, court official (died 1866)
- 20 June – Carl Fredric Dahlgren, poet (died 1844)
- Ulrika Möllersvärd, courtier (died 1878)
- Wendla Åberg, dancer and actress (died 1864)

== Deaths ==
- 1 January - Anna Charlotta Schröderheim, salonnière (born 1754)
- 4 April – Elisabeth Lillström, opera singer and actress (born 1717)
- 14 May - Maja-Lisa Borgman, coffee house owner (born 1750s)
- Brita Horn, courtier (born 1745)
