= 1734 in Sweden =

- Years in Sweden: 1731 1732 1733 1734 1735 1736 1737
- Centuries: 17th century · 18th century · 19th century
- Decades: 1700s 1710s 1720s 1730s 1740s 1750s 1760s
- Years: 1731 1732 1733 1734 1735 1736 1737

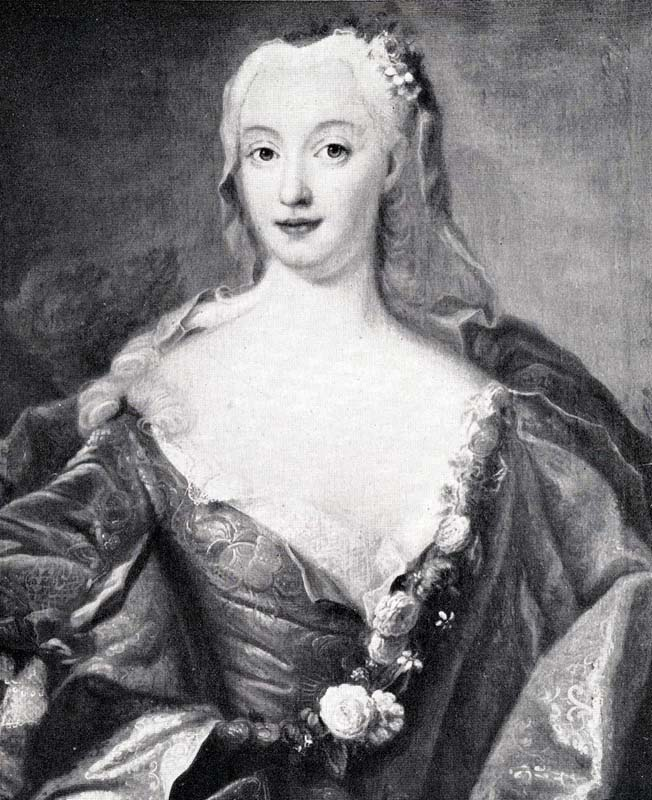
Hedvig Taube by Lorens Pasch.

Events from the year 1734 in Sweden

== Incumbents ==
- Monarch – Frederick I

== Events ==
- The Civil Code of 1734 is passed. This regulates all society, introducing numerous new laws. Among them the ban of torture (though the interpretation of this law allows for the practice to continue), restrictions of a man's right to abuse his wife, bans any other form of marriage except that conducted by the church, and bans illegitimate children from inheritance.
- Defense treaty between Sweden and Denmark.
- Carl Linnaeus conduct his trip to Dalarna.
- Brigitta Scherzenfeldt return to Sweden from her enslavement in Central Asia.
- The amateur theatrical society "Greve De la Gardies comedianter" performs in Stockholm, starring Brita Sophia De la Gardie, which cause an interest for the establishment of a professional Swedish language theater, which is realized in 1737.
- The King's mistress, Hedvig Taube, is officially acknowledged as his lover after she is granted a title and her own residence after the birth of their child, which attracts a national scandal.

== Births ==
- 19 February - Nils Philip Gyldenstolpe, Marshal (died 1810)
- 18 April - Elsa Beata Bunge, botanist (died 1819)
- 20 March - Torbern Bergman, chemist (died 1774)
- unknown date - Ulrica Arfvidsson, fortune teller (died 1801)
- unknown date - Catharina Ahlgren, writer (died 1800)
- Hedvig Sirenia, poet (died 1795)
- Maria Elisabet Öberg, weaver (died 1808)
- Hedvig Sofia von Rosen, royal governess (died 1809)
