= 1735 in Sweden =

- Years in Sweden: 1732 1733 1734 1735 1736 1737 1738
- Centuries: 17th century · 18th century · 19th century
- Decades: 1700s 1710s 1720s 1730s 1740s 1750s 1760s
- Years: 1732 1733 1734 1735 1736 1737 1738

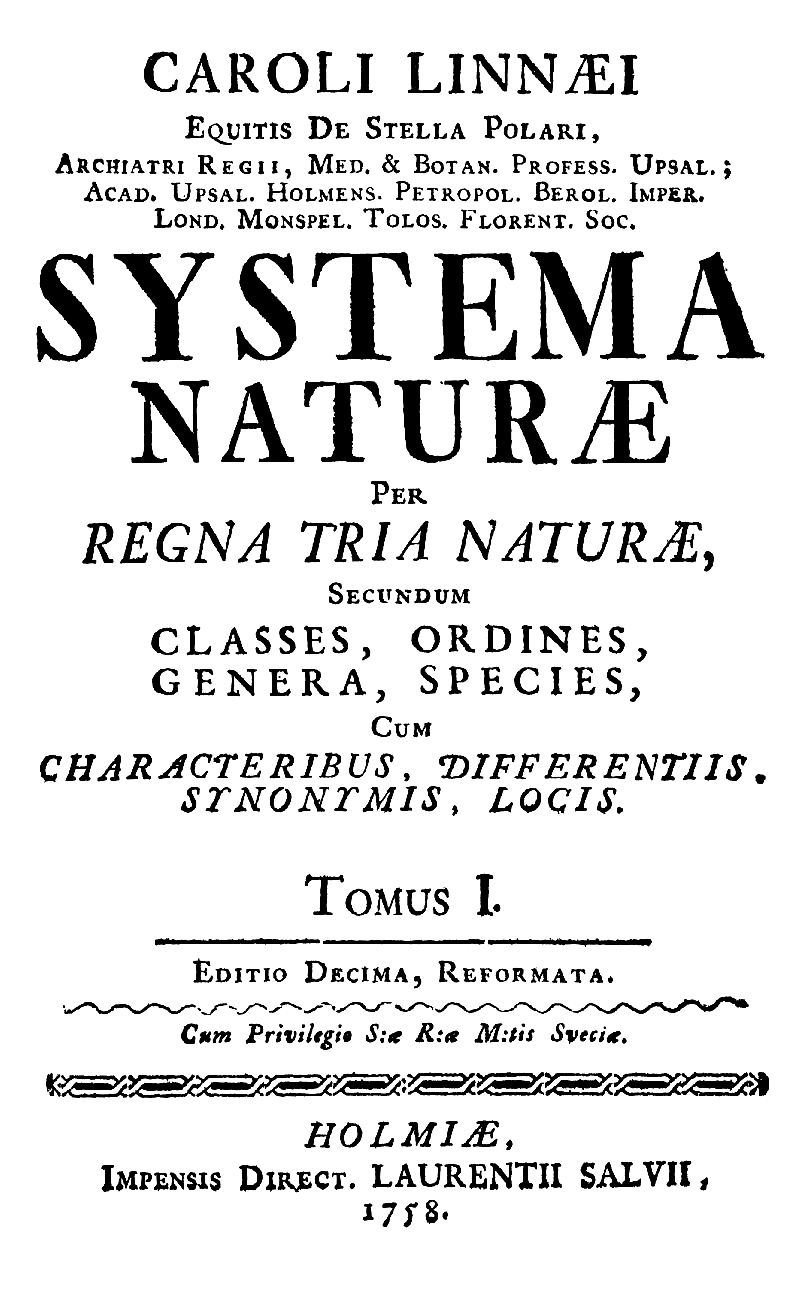
Linnaeus1758-title-page

Events from the year 1735 in Sweden

== Incumbents ==
- Monarch – Frederick I

== Events ==
- 17 March - The Freemasonry is introduced to Sweden by Axel Wrede Sparre.
- 10 May - Kongliga Ritarakademien is created: it is re-founded as the Royal Swedish Academy of Arts in 1773.
- August - Arvid Horn renews the treaty between Sweden and Russia.
- - The Riksdag introduce and amendment to the sumptuary law of clothing from 1731, when all manner of artificial and superfluous decorations within clothing are to be banned: the law results in a fiasco when the members of parliament are themselves attacked by spies wishing to report law breakers, and in practice, the law is ignored until fallen out of use in 1738.
- - Systema naturae by Carl Linnaeus.
- - Sweden establish a permanent embassy at Constantinople in the Ottoman Empire.
- The Speigelberg Company tour Sweden and is confirmed to have performed in Norrköping this year.

== Births ==
- 2 April - Ulrika Pasch, painter (died 1796)
- 23 September - Clas Bjerkander, meteorologist, botanist, and entomologist (died 1795)
- - Anna Hammar-Rosén, publisher (died 1805)

== Deaths ==
- 27 September - Peter Artedi, naturalist (born 1705)
- - Charlotta von Liewen, politically active countess (born 1683)
- - Catharina Bröms, ironmaster (born 1665)
