= 1808 in Sweden =

- Years in Sweden: 1805 1806 1807 1808 1809 1810 1811
- Centuries: 18th century · 19th century · 20th century
- Decades: 1770s 1780s 1790s 1800s 1810s 1820s 1830s
- Years: 1805 1806 1807 1808 1809 1810 1811

Events from the year 1808 in Sweden

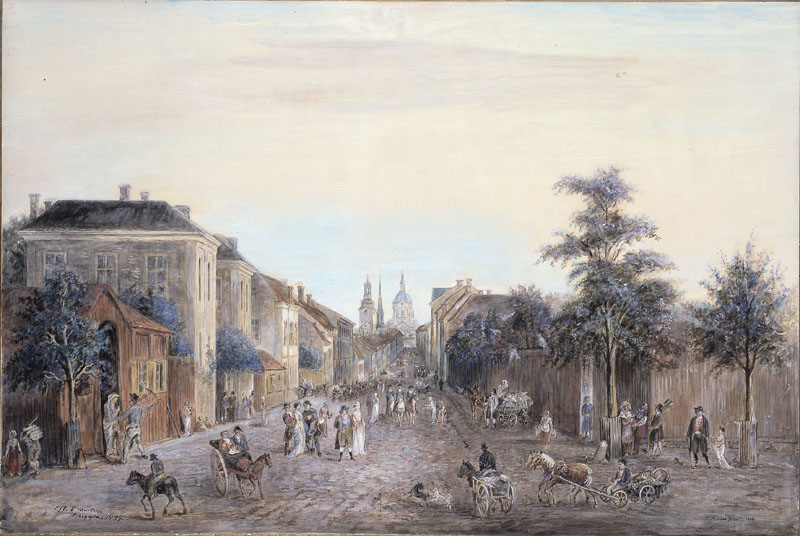
Drottninggatan 1808

== Incumbents ==
- Monarch – Gustav IV Adolf

== Events ==
- 21 February - Finnish War
- 2 May - Battle of Pulkkila
- 2 March - Siege of Sveaborg
- 14 March - Dano-Swedish War of 1808–09 starts.
- 16 April - Battle of Pyhäjoki
- 18 April - Battle of Siikajoki
- 27 April - Battle of Revolax
- 28 April - Battle of Furuholm
- 19–20 June - Battle of Lemo
- August - Jämtland Campaign of 1808
- 27 October - Battle of Koljonvirta
- 18 September - Battle of Palva Sund
- 26–28 September - Helsinki village landing
- - Jöns Jacob Berzelius publishes the second part of his Föreläsningar i Djurkemien.
- - Elisa Servenius enlists in the Swedish army dressed as a man because "She had decided to live and to die with her husband", the soldier Bernhard Servenus; she participates in the war between Sweden and Russia about Finland, and during one battle, she collected the ammunition of the Russians and gave them to her comrades. She is later discovered, fired but decorated with a medal for bravery in battle.
- - The first school for the deaf and mute in Sweden is founded by Pär Aron Borg.

== Births ==
- 6 March - Sofia Adlersparre, painter (died 1862)
- 8 September – Wendela Hebbe, reporter, often called the first female reporter of her country (died 1899)
- - Emanuel Björling, mathematician (died 1872)
- 21 October - Maria Christina Bruhn, inventor (born 1732)
- 28 December - Andreas Bruce, transsexual memoir writer (died 1885)

== Deaths ==
- 3 January – Fredrika Eleonora von Düben, artist (born 1738)
- 26 February - Lovisa Simson, theater director (born 1746)
- 19 August - Fredrik Henrik af Chapman, shipbuilder (born 1721)
- 30 March – Gustaf Fredrik Gyllenborg, writer (born 1731)
- 1 October – Thomas Thorild, poet (born 1759)
- undated - Maria Elisabet Öberg, weaver (born 1734)
