= 1731 in Sweden =

- Years in Sweden: 1728 1729 1730 1731 1732 1733 1734
- Centuries: 17th century · 18th century · 19th century
- Decades: 1700s 1710s 1720s 1730s 1740s 1750s 1760s
- Years: 1728 1729 1730 1731 1732 1733 1734

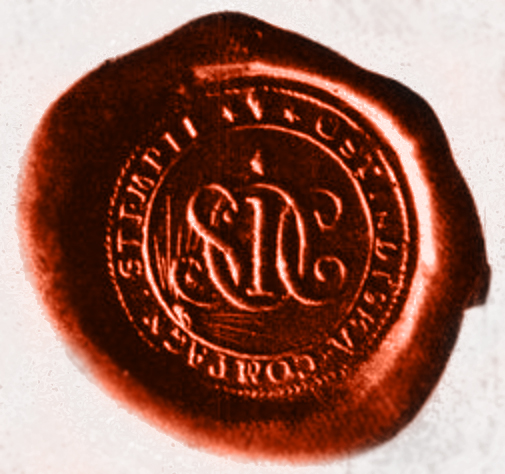

Events from the year 1731 in Sweden

== Incumbents ==
- Monarch – Frederick I

== Events ==
- - The Swedish East India Company is founded.
- - The process against the sect Gråkoltarna in Stockholm.
- - The Riksdag issues a strict sumptuary law: in an effort to benefit the economy and the production within the country, import of luxury goods is restricted by a number of reforms were rules are set up to dictate what amount of dishes are to be served at dinner or what sort of clothing are allowed according to class. The law becomes unpopular, results in an active spy activity among the public, and falls out of use after the change of government in 1738.
- - The King enters into his notorious love affair with Hedvig Taube.
- - The famous inn Clas på Hörnet is opened in Stockholm and becomes the perhaps most famed inn in Stockholm for the rest of the century.

== Births ==
- 1 May - Gustaf Philip Creutz, diplomat and poet (died 1785)
- 25 November - Gustaf Fredrik Gyllenborg, writer (died 1808)
- date unknown – Margareta Christina Giers, painter (died 1765)

== Deaths ==
- 23 January - Anna Lohe, banker (born 1654)
- - Magnus Bromelius, physician and paleontologist (born 1679)
