= 1760 in Sweden =

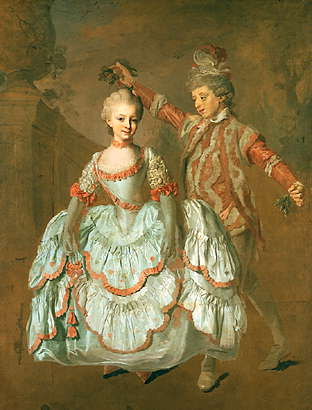

Events from the year 1760 in Sweden

== Incumbents ==
- Monarch – Adolf Frederick

== Events ==
- The assembly of the Riksdag of the Estates.

== Births ==
- 5 June – Johan Gadolin, chemist, physicist and mineralogist (died 1852)
- 19 May – Antoine Bournonville, ballet dancer (died 1843)
- 29 May – Charlotte Slottsberg, ballerina (died 1800)
- 2 March - Christina Charlotta Cederström, artist (died 1832)
- September - Olof Swartz, botanist and taxonomist (died 1818)
- October - Fredrica Löf, actress and courtesan (died 1813)
- 2 March - Helena Maria Ehrenstråhle, poet (died 1800)
- date unknown - Christina Rahm, opera singer and actress (died 1837)

== Deaths ==
- 12 August – Maria Amalia of Saxony, Queen consort of Naples and Sicily and former Princess of Sweden (b. 1724)
