= 1767 in Sweden =

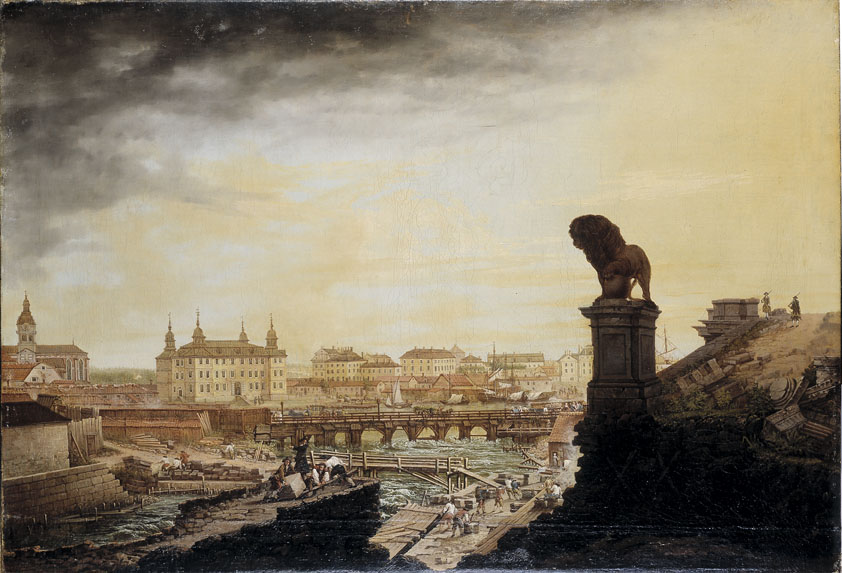
Sevenbom, Mynttorget

Events from the year 1767 in Sweden

== Incumbents ==
- Monarch – Adolf Frederick

== Events ==
- The Riksdag of the Estates, which had convened since 1765 and was dominated by the ruling "Caps" (Mössorna) party, was finally dissolved in 1767 after failing to resolve the country's severe economic crisis and political deadlock. This created a governing vacuum and heightened the sense of national instability.
- The country continued to suffer from a severe financial crisis and high debt stemming from the previous government's (Hats) aggressive, mercantilist policies and expensive wars. The economic situation, coupled with poor harvests, contributed to widespread discontent among the populace.
- All spinning for both household needs as well as for selling is freely permitted in all Sweden.
- Tankar i anledning af Sista Öfwerflöds-Förordningen Och Dess wärkställighet; Fattade i pennan, och Dedicerade til MALCONTENTERNE, Af En Fri Svensk, by Françoise Marguerite Janiçon

== Births ==
- January - Catharina Ulrika Hjort af Ornäs, murder victim (died 1837)
- 16 January - Anders Gustaf Ekeberg, chemist who discovered tantalum in 1802 (died 1813)
- 1 February – Ulrika Melin, textile artist (died 1834)
- 10 December - Conrad Quensel, naturalist (died 1806)
- 10 December - Fredrik Gyllenborg, Prime Minister of Sweden (died 1829)

== Deaths ==
- 9 May - Jean Fredman, role model of the Songs of Fredman (born 1712)
- Lisbetta Isacsdotter, religious leader (born 1733)
