= 1665 in Sweden =

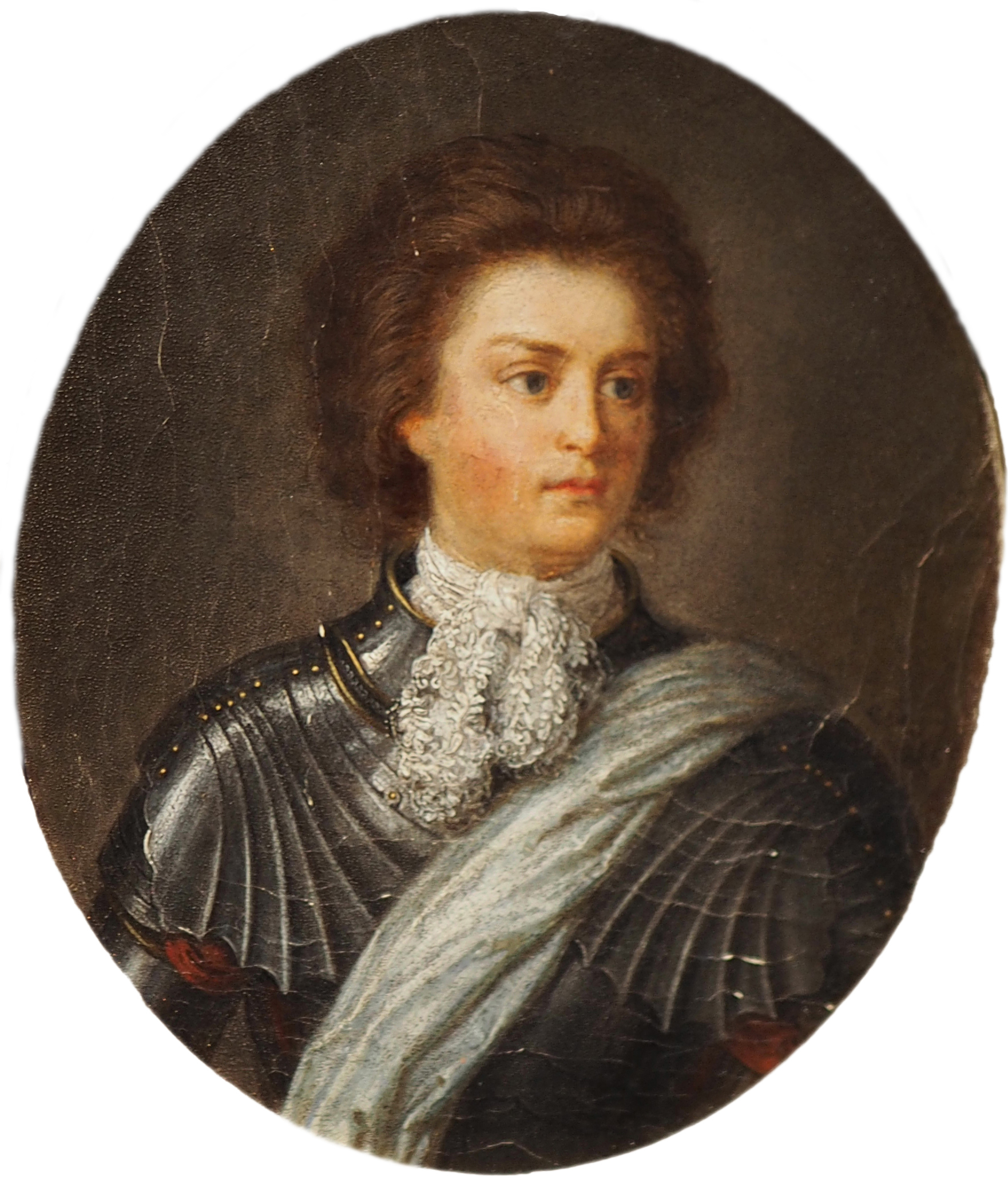
Philip Christoph von Königsmarck

Events from the year 1665 in Sweden

== Incumbents ==
- Monarch – Charles XI

== Births ==
- 4 March - Philip Christoph von Königsmarck, soldier (died 1694)
- Ingeborg i Mjärhult, natural healer, medicine woman, herbalist, natural philosopher, soothsayer and spiritual visionary (d. 1749)
- Magnus Stenbock, officer (d. 1717)
- Catharina Bröms, ironmaster (d. 1735)
- Jonas Lambert-Wenman, pirate (d. 1732)
