= Christina Rahm =

Swedish opera singer

Christina Rahm (1763–1837) was a Swedish opera singer and stage actress. She was active in the Stenborg Company at the Eriksberg Theatre in Stockholm in 1780-84 and at the Stenborg Theatre in 1784-99, and thereafter in travelling theatres. In 1785, she became the first Swedish artist to play Rosina in The Barber of Seville.

== Life ==
Christina Rahm arrived in Stockholm in 1782 as the spouse of the wigmaker of the Royal Swedish Opera, Jacob Rahm. She was engaged by Carl Stenborg of the Stenborg Company the same year, which was housed in the Eriksberg Theatre until 1784 and then at the Stenborg Theatre.

The Stenborg theater was a very popular theater normally frequented by the public in Stockholm rather than the upper classes, and where Rahm was to become a celebrated prima donna. As she was both an opera singer and a dramatic actress, she could act in both opera performances and theater plays, and was described as "one of the theatre's most useful actresses." She was described as a good singer and was often given main parts when the theater offered opera and other lyrical performances. Several benefit performances were given to Christina Rahm, illustrating her status as one of the theater's most valuable members.

She was often used in the role of soubrette. On 11 December 1785, she was the first Swedish artist to play Rosina in The Barber of Seville. She is noted to have played the role pregnant with her daughter: she had five children.

After the 1798-99 season, the Stenborg theater was closed after the introduction of the Stockholm monopoly of the royal theaters. Rahm toured with the travelling theatre of Johan Anton Lindqvist, where she performed in Gothenburg. In 1800, her husband died in poverty. In 1804–09, she was active as a member in the travelling theatre of Carl Stenborg, and as such performed in Linköping, Karlskrona Kalmar and Gothenburg.

== Roles ==
Among her parts were Jenny in Kungen och skogvaktaren (The king and the gamekeeper), Lisbet in Njugg spar, Orphale in Alexander den Store (Alexander the Great) (1784), Catau in Julie (1786), Rosalie in Den bedragne bedragaren (The deceived deceiver) (1788), baron Birkwitz in Greven av Oldsbach (The Count of Oldsbach) (1790), the abbess in The Magic Flute (1794), and Genevieve in Richard Coeur-de-lion by Michel-Jean Sedaine (1795).

When the playwright Didrik Gabriel Björn launched his play Det besynnerliga spektaklet (The odd spectacle) (1790), as an after-play to Greven av Oldsbach (The Count of Oldsbach) by Brandes translated by Björn, the artists of the theatre were to thank the audience for their support in the guise of their most popular role characters. Björn performed as himself: Magnus Bonn as Mäster Sock in Skomakaren (The Shoemaker), Anders Lundberg as Hyrkusken (The Coachman) in Engelsmannen i Paris (An Englishman in Paris) by Auguste-Louis Bertin d'Antilly, Johan Petter Lindskog as Bartholo and Bazile in The Barber of Seville, Jonas Sundman as Jonas in Mäklaren (The Broker), Carl Schylander as Mor Bobi and dansmästare Rigadoun, Johanna Löfblad as Gertrud in Njugg spar (The stingy saver), Brita Maria Modéer as the maid in Den obetänksamma (The Thoughtless one), Christina Rahm as Anna Stina in Mascarade by Holberg, Lisette Stenberg as Lady Alton in Skottländskan (The Scottish Woman) by Voltaire, Margareta Sofia Lagerqvist as Anette in Anette and Lubin by Charles Dibdin, and Eva Säfström as Trädgårdsflickan (The gardener girl) in Sophie.
