= 1742 in Sweden =

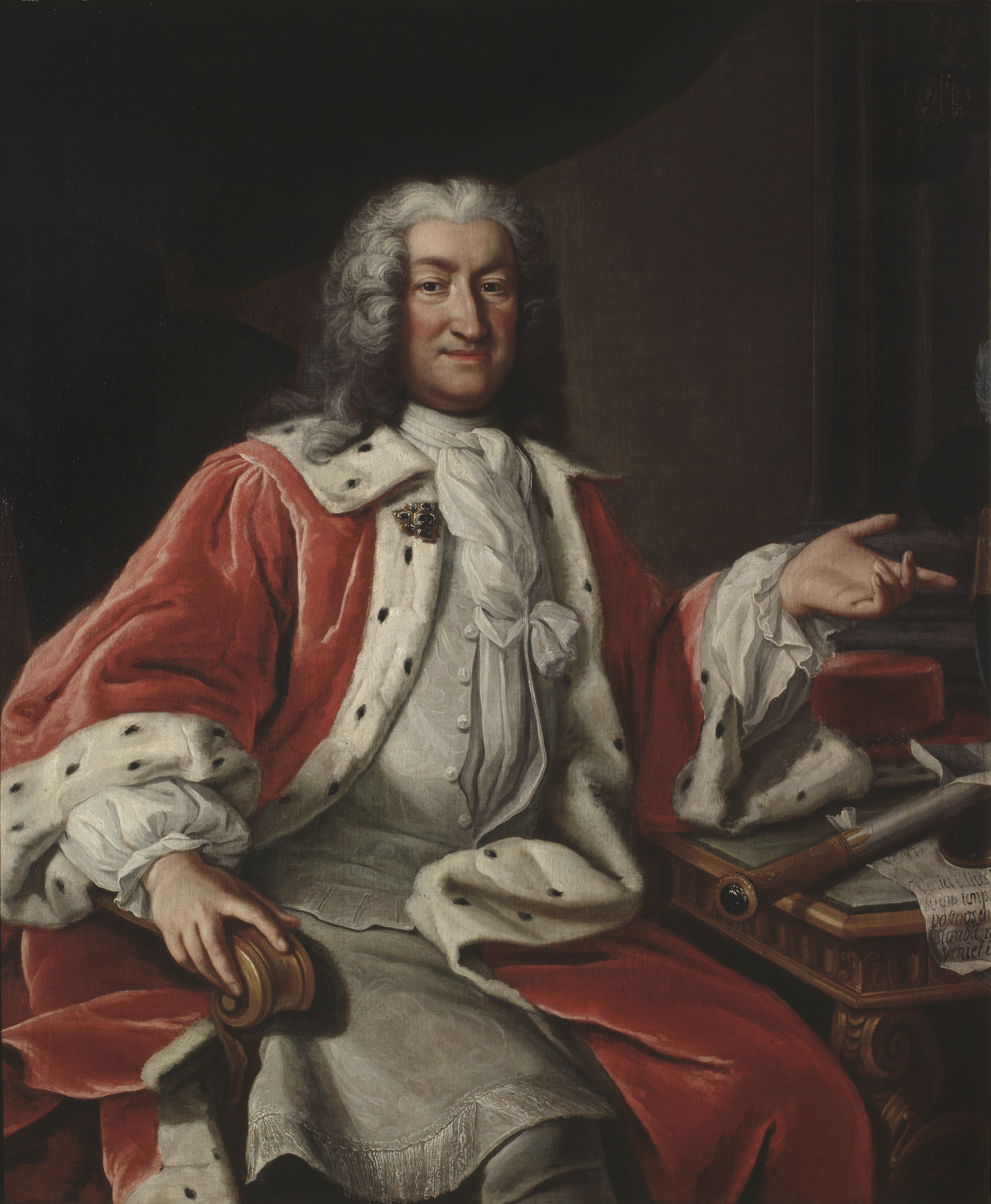
Arvid Horn

Events from the year 1742 in Sweden

== Incumbents ==
- Monarch – Frederick I

== Events ==
- Glass company Kosta Glasbruk (now known as Kosta Boda) is founded.
- 18 March - Empress Elizabeth I of Russia issued a manifesto to the people of Finland, suggesting a possibility of an autonomous Finnish state.
- June - Finland is occupied by Russia during the War of the Hats.
- 9 August - The Swedish forces in Finland surrender to the Russian army in Helsingfors (Helsinki).
- Empress Elizabeth I of Russia states that Sweden may have Finland back if her candidate in the election for an heir to the Swedish throne, Adolf Frederik of Holstein-Gottorp, is accepted.
- The Hats lose government power and are replaced by a government supported by the Caps.
- Anders Celsius construct the Celsius thermometer.
- Adelriks och Giöthildas äfwentyr by Jacob Henrik Mörk.

== Births ==
- 28 July - Rutger Macklean, driving figure in the reorganization of agricultural lands (died 1816)
- 3 October - Anders Jahan Retzius, scientist (died 1821)
- Christina Krook, educator (died 1806)
- 9 December – Carl Wilhelm Scheele, chemist (died 1786)

== Deaths ==
- 17 April – Arvid Horn, politician (born 1664)
- Lars Roberg, physician (born 1664)
- June 21 - Johannes Steuchius, arch bishop (born 1676)
