= 1800 in Sweden =

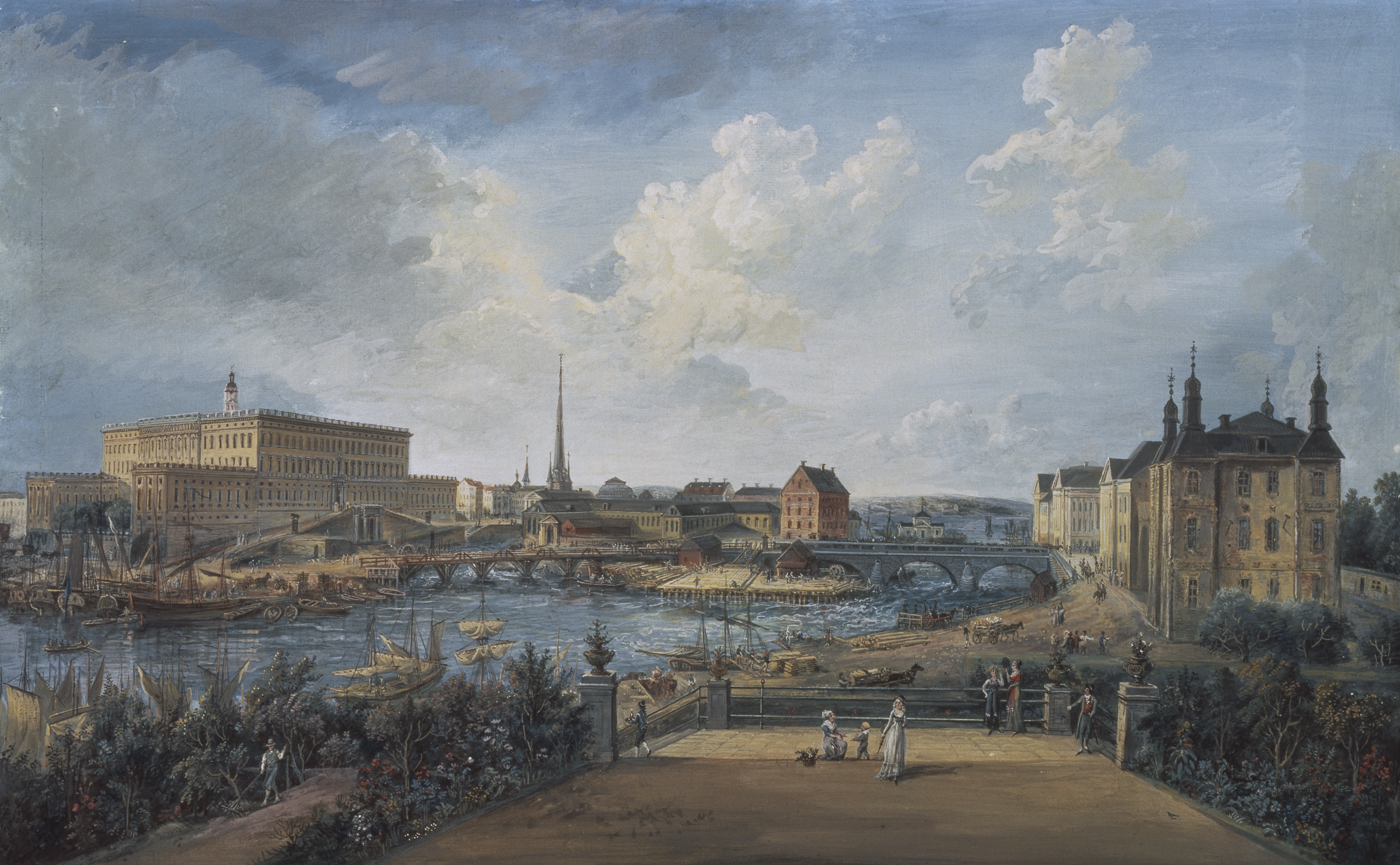
Elias Martin

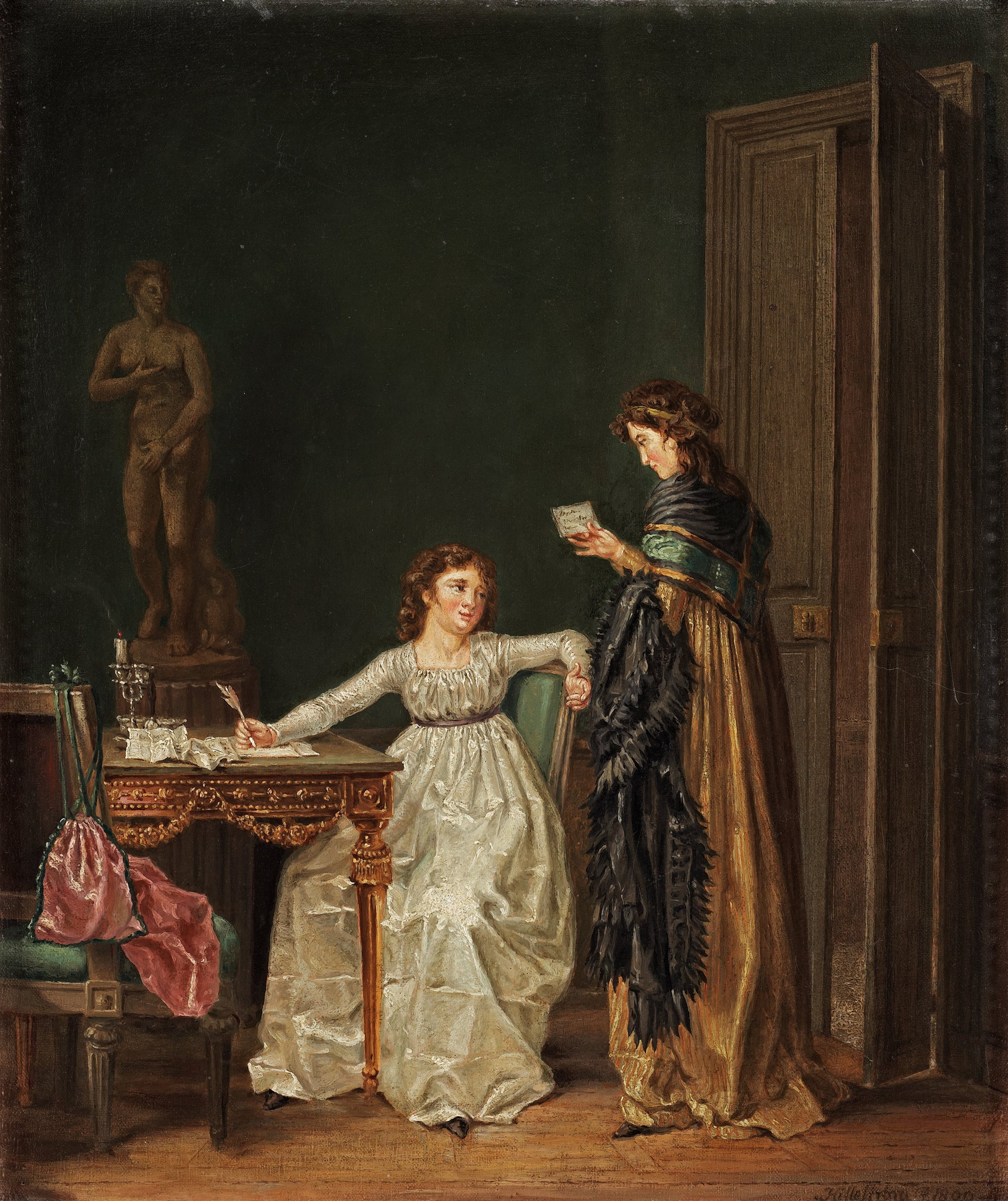
Kärleksbrevet 1800

Events from the year 1800 in Sweden

== Incumbents ==
- Monarch – Gustav IV Adolf

== Events ==
- 14 August - Trollhätte Canal, later a part of the Göta Canal, is inaugurated.
- Linnéska institutet is inaugurated.

== Births ==
- 10 January – Lars Levi Læstadius, religious reformer (died 1861)
- 1 October – Peter Wieselgren, founder of the Swedish temperance movement (died 1877)
- Helena Eldrup, educator (died 1872)

== Deaths ==
- 21 May - Carl August Ehrensvärd, artist and architect (born 1745)
- 29 May - Charlotte Slottsberg, ballerina (born 1760)
- Julie Eckerman, courtesan and spy (born 1765)
- Hedvig Catharina De la Gardie, courtier (born 1732)
- Helena Maria Ehrenstråhle, poet (born 1760)
- Margareta Sofia Lagerqvist, actress and singer (born 1771)
- Eva Fundin, actress and dancer (born 1777)
