= 1673 in Sweden =

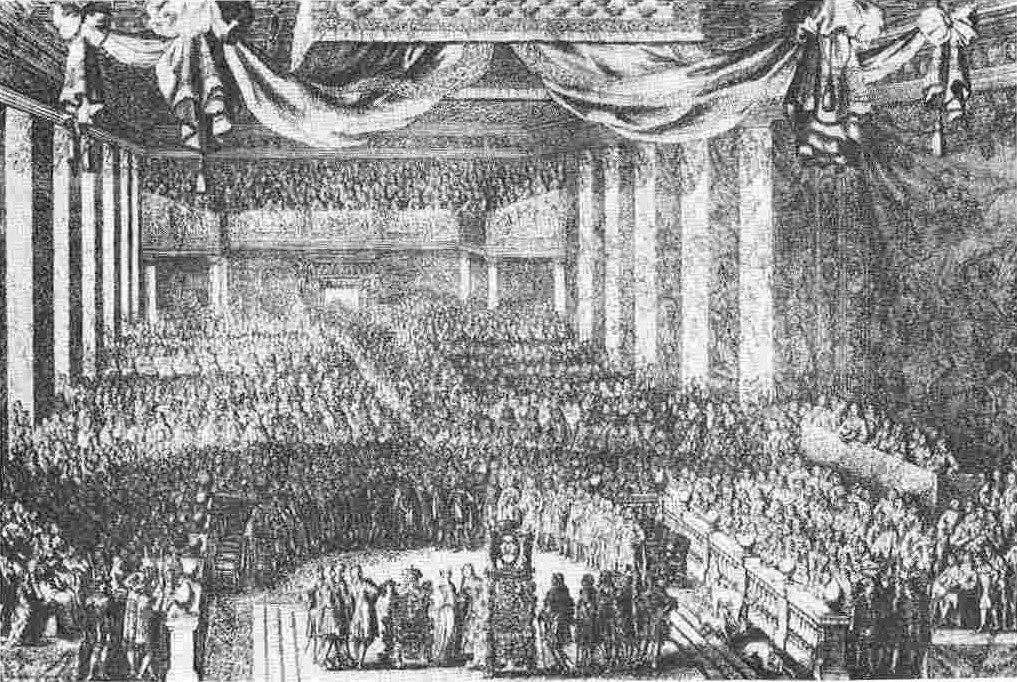

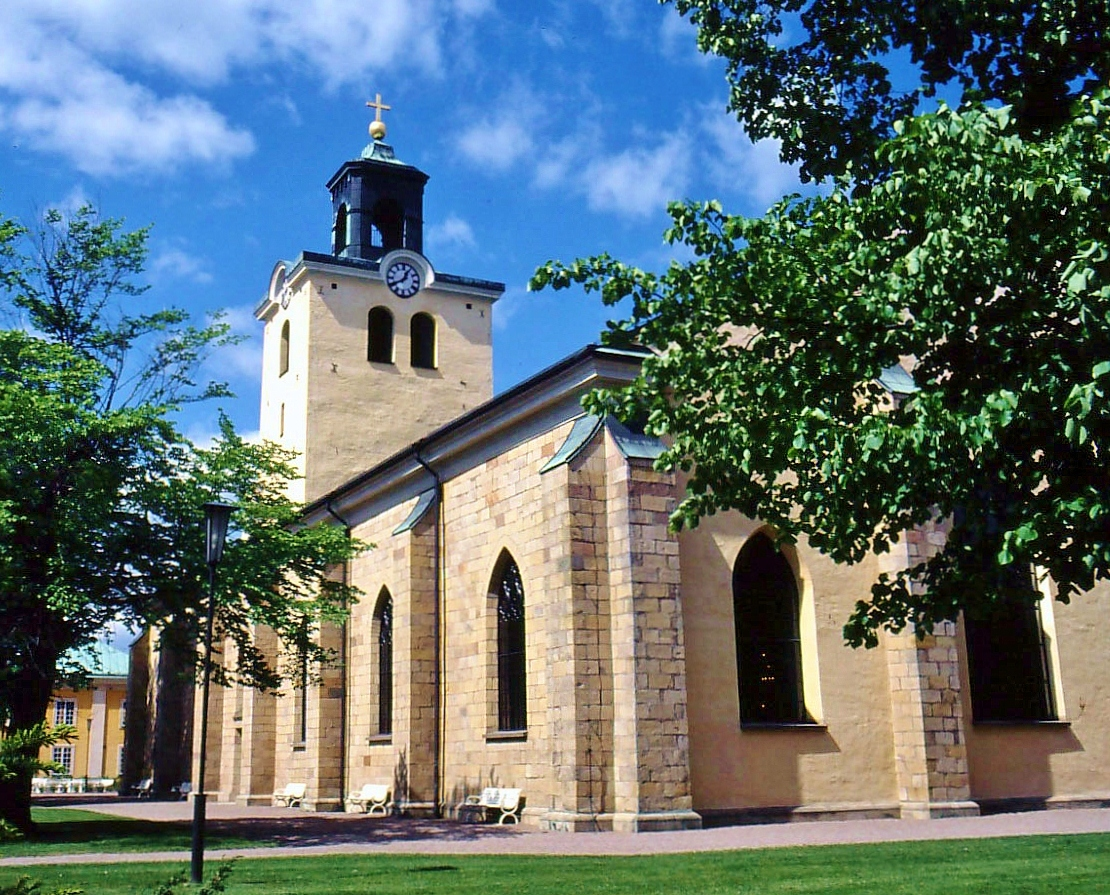
Christina Church

Events from the year 1673 in Sweden

== Incumbents ==
- Monarch – Charles XI

== Events ==
- Inauguration of the Christina Church
- The monarch makes his Eriksgata.
- The start of a five year long period of bad harvests.

== Births ==
- Anna Catharina von Bärfelt, royal favorite (died 1738)
- Christina Piper, politically influential countess and landowner (died 1752)

== Deaths ==
- Anna Margareta von Haugwitz, countess (born 1622)
