= Schylander =

Schylander is a surname. Notable people with the surname include:

- Caleb Schylander (1895–1977), Swedish footballer
- Carl Schylander (1748–1811), Swedish stage actor
- Maria Schylander (born 1973), Swedish biathlete
