= Fundin =

Fundin may refer to:

== People ==
- Eva Fundin (1777-1800), Swedish actress and dancer
- Ove Fundin (born 1933), a Swedish speedway rider
- Wilhelmina Fundin (1819-1911), a Swedish operatic soprano

== Places ==
- Fundin (lake), a lake in Trøndelag and Innlandet counties in Norway
