= Säfström =

Säfström is a Swedish surname. Notable people with the surname include:

- Eleonora Säfström (1770–1857), Swedish actress
- Erik Säfström (born 1988), Swedish bandy player
- Orvar Säfström (born 1974), Swedish film critic and video game journalist
