= 1664 in Sweden =

Events from the year 1664 in Sweden

== Incumbents ==
- Monarch – Charles XI

== Events ==
- Carl Gustaf Wrangel appointed Lord High Constable of Sweden.
- Publication of Gautreks saga.
- A new sumptuary law, replaced and amended the previous one of 1644, restrict the guests at engagement dinners to family and bans the custom of conducting them in bath houses; weddings are no longer to be celebrated for more than one day; the guests at weddings are restricted; dress fashion are regulated according to class and only the nobility, the clergy and the highest circles of the burgher class are allowed valuable textiles (in the latter cases in more discreet colors), and then only within the restrictions of customary dress, as the habit of adjusting to fashion had become more and more common, which worried the authorities who wished to have a permanent dress fashion for each class: this law is however not respected.
- The English conquest of New Netherland, which led to the end of New Sweden's governance

== Births ==
- 4 January - Lars Roberg, physician (d. 1742)
- 6 April - Arvid Horn, politician (d. 1742)
- Gustaf Cronhielm, politician (d. 1737)
- Johan August Meijerfeldt, general (d. 1749)
