= 1721 in Sweden =

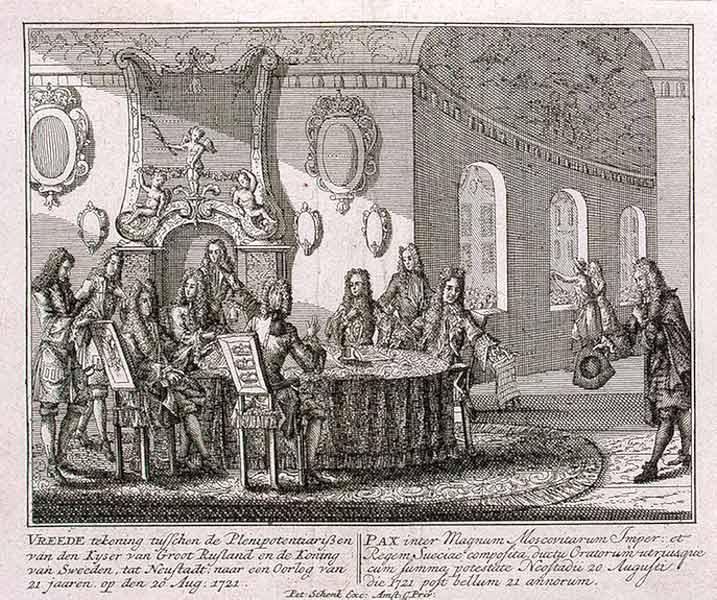
Signing of the Treaty of Nystad

Events from the year 1721 in Sweden

== Incumbents ==
- Monarch – Frederick I

== Events ==
- 15 April - A great fire in Gothenburg.
- 25 May - The Battle of Sundsvall during the Russian Pillage of 1719-1721.
- May to June - Hudiksvall, Härnösand, Piteå, Sundsvall, Söderhamn and Umeå are burned by the Russians during the Russian Pillage of 1719-1721, but Gävle is successfully defended.
- 10 September – The Treaty of Nystad is signed, ending the Great Northern War.
- Den Gyldene Freden
- The first theater performance is presented at the Bollhuset for fifteen years, since the theater is opened again after the war.
- The Maria Ersdotter case.

== Births ==
- Catharina Elisabet Grubb, industrialist (died 1788)
- Fredrik Henrik af Chapman, shipbuilder, scientist and officer (died 1808)

== Deaths ==
- Maria Ersdotter, criminal (born 1685)
- Carl Morner, Swedish field marshal (born 1721)
- Margaretha Ehrensteen, nobewoman
