= Stenborg Theatre =

Former theatre in Stockholm, Sweden

- Munkbroteatern, Svenska Komiska Teatern, Komiska Teatern
- Address: Stockholm; Sweden
- Owner: Carl Stenborg

Construction
- Opened: 1784
- Closed: 1799
- Years active: 1784-1799

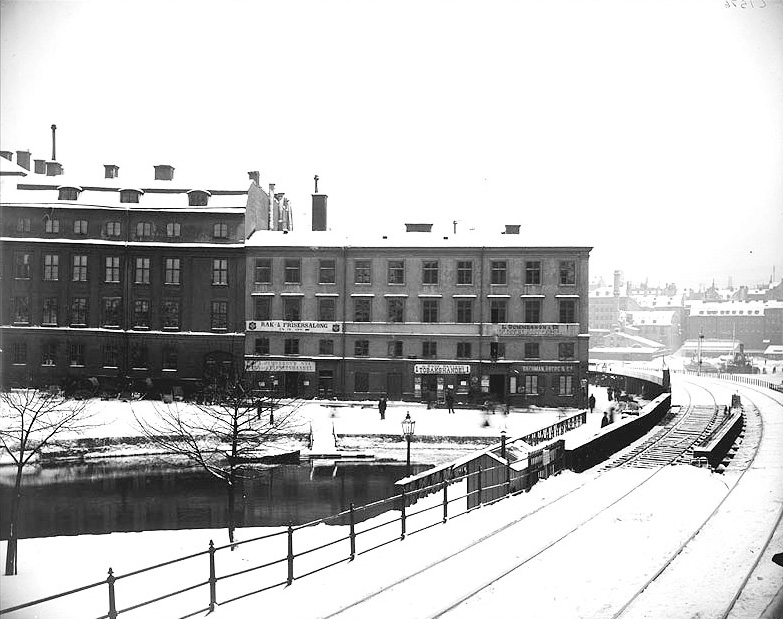
"Memmon Quarters" in sweden

The Stenborg theatre, also called Svenska Komiska Teatern, Komiska Teatern and Munkbroteatern, was a historical Swedish 18th century theatre, active between 1784 and 1799 in Gamla stan in Stockholm. It was the second theatre of Stockholm during the Gustavian age. In 1784-87, before the inauguration of the theatre of Ristell in Bollhuset, it was the only dramatic theatre of the native language in Stockholm.

== History ==
=== Background ===
The Stenborg theatre was a continuation of the famous Stenborg Troupe; when the first Swedish national theatre at Bollhuset was closed in 1753–54, half of the troupe performed in various localities in the city under the leadership of Petter Stenborg. When the national stage was re-established by king Gustav III of Sweden in 1773, it did not include the old Stenborg troupe. In 1780, the troupe had finally acquired a proper house to perform in; Eriksbergsteatern, (The Eriksberg Theatre), and in 1781, the leadership was taken over by Petter Stenborg son, Carl Stenborg. In 1780–84, the Eriksberg Theatre was the only permanent theatre on the native language in Stockholm.

The Erikberg Theatre was uncomfortably outside of town, and the Stenborg troupe under Carl Stenborg searched for a new building. They made a partnership with the rich brewer Christina Nyman, who wanted to establish a theatre in Gamla stan and had obtained a permission to do so. The theatre was housed in a large building erected in Gamla Stan in 1782; the first floor housed four taverns and several apartments, while the second floor was reserved for the Stenborg troupe. From 1784, it was formally named Svenska komiska Teatern (Swedish Comical Theatre) or Svenska Teatern (Swedish Theatre) and from 1788 Komiska Teatern (Comedy Theatre). It was also known as Munkbroteatern (The Munkbro Theatre), after its location. The common name for it was always the Stenborg Theatre.

=== Activity ===
The theatre was luxuriously decorated and was in 1784 called the biggest theatre in the country. The theatrically interested king was present at its premier and gave away gifts to its performers. However, it did not have the same status as the Royal Swedish Opera and Royal Dramatic Theatre and was considered much less formal: it was a place for less formal and solemn performances, a place for satirical comedy and such, and foreigners sometimes compared it to a boulevard-theatre of the kind that was popular in Paris which also performed less formal opera and musicals. The Barber of Seville had its Swedish premiere here in 1785, as well as The Marriage of Figaro in 1792. Also foreign guest-artists and circus-performances were given here; in the autumn of 1793, the English circus-company of Peter and James Price performed acrobatics and tight-rope-dancing here, were the four-year-old Louise Price danced on a rope. The theater's status as a less serious theatre did not stop actors from the Royal Swedish Opera and the Royal Dramatic Theatre to appear there; even Elisabeth Olin had performed here, and it was in fact used by actors and singers to work in during their conflicts with the managements with their regular stages.

The director Carl Stenborg, who was a celebrated opera singer at the Royal Swedish Opera, resided in one of the apartments, where he and his wife, the singer Betty Olin, hosted gatherings and parties for the cultural elite of the city. The theatre often took their staff from the choir at the Royal Opera, but it also took in its own students. An advertisement in 1786 read as follows:

"If some common parents, who own children of a beautiful appearance and a good voice, would like to have them educated, for their own benefit, in a talent which may be beneficial to their future, they may have an education and a reward answering to their ability, when they enlist at the royal secretary Stenborg at the New Swedish theatre house at Munkbron".

=== Closure ===
In 1798, the new monopoly of the royal theaters was proclaimed in the city of Stockholm, and the Stenborg theatre was closed the year after (the monopoly was in effect until 1842). The building itself was torn down in 1899.

== Staff at the Stenborg theatre of 1791 ==
Stage manager

- D. G. Björn

Director

- C. Stenborg

Actors

- M. Bonn
- A. Lundberg
- C. Ljunggren
- J. P. Lindskog
- C. Bonn
- J. Sundman

Actresses

- E. Säfström
- L. Stenberg
- C. Rahm
- M. S. Lagerqvist
- C. Löfblad
- B. M. Modeer

Guest actors

- Carl Schylander from the Royal Dramatic Theatre
- Dahlqvist, Hans Björkman and Nils Magnus Annerstedt from the Royal Swedish Opera.

== See also ==
- Comediehuset
- Bjornegardteatern
- Djurgårdsteatern
