= Johan Lohe =

Swedish banker

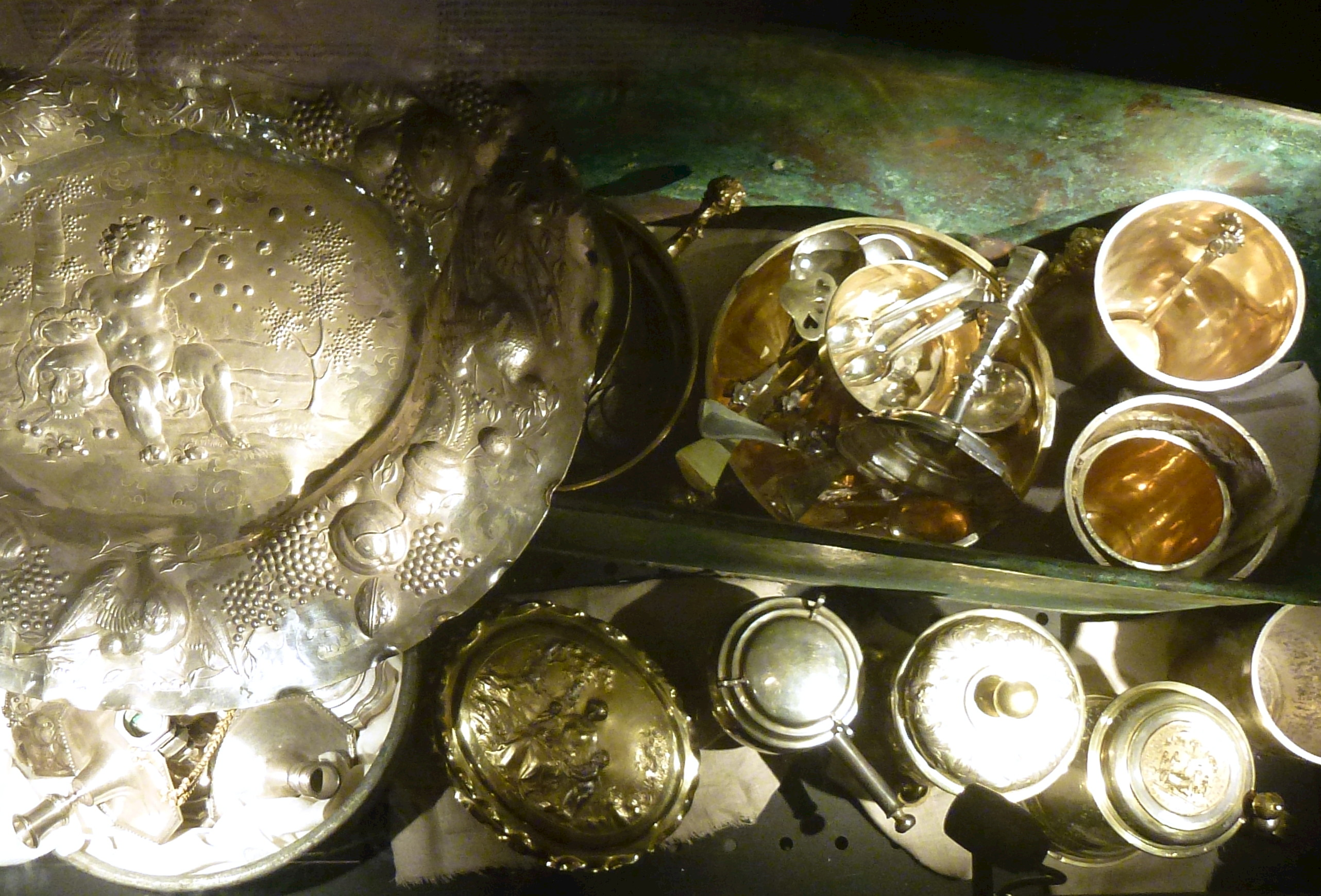
Loheskatten ('Lohe Treasure') found in 1937

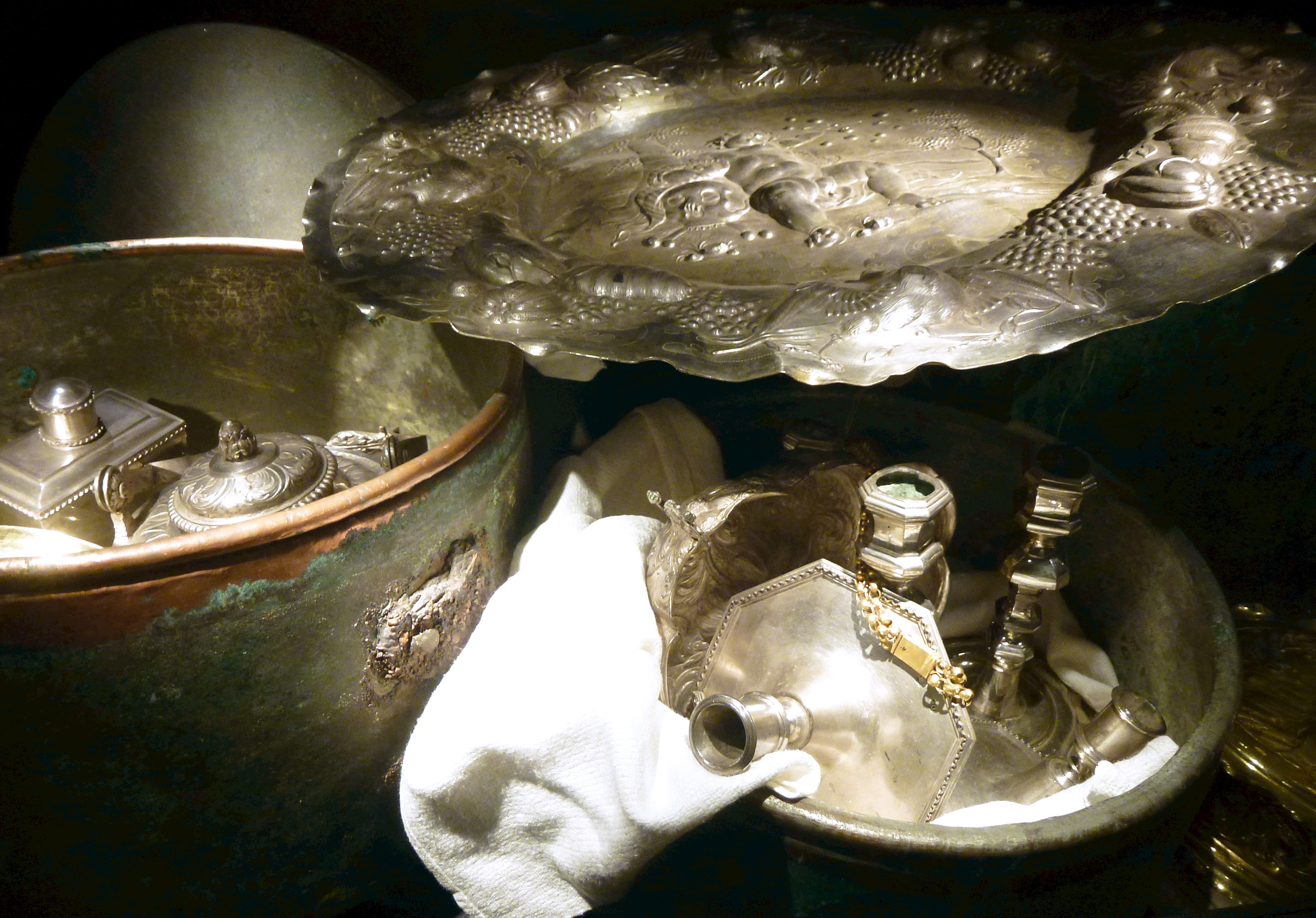
Loheskatten ('Lohe Treasure') found in 1937

Johan Lohe (1643–1704) was a Swedish banker.

== Biography ==
Johan Lohe was born in Germany but moved to Sweden in 1658. He was included in the business of his paternal uncle, Henrik Lohe (1594 - c. 1666) who had moved to Sweden during the 1620s. He had built a sugar mill in Stockholm and was the owner of many vessels.

Eventually Lohe started his own business with great success. He was one of the richest people in Sweden, and managed a trading company, a shipping business, a sugar refinery and ironworks. However, he became most known for his banking business as a moneylender, by which he acquired an enormous fortune and counted the king of Sweden among his clients; he was ennobled in 1703.

He married Anna Lohe (1654–1731) in 1673, with whom he had eighteen children; she took over his business after his death. She lived with her two unmarried children Adolf Lohe (1683–1759) and Johanna Lohe (1690–1759) on Lilla Nygatan until her death.

== Lohe Treasure (Loheskatten) ==
It was likely Adolf and Johanna Lohe who hid the great Lohe Treasure (Loheskatten) under the floor of the house during the Dalecarlian rebellion (1743). Excavated in 1937, the treasure consisted of 85 silver pieces and just over 18,000 silver coins dating from the early to mid-17th century. Today, the treasure is exhibited at the Stockholm City Museum and in the Royal Coin Cabinet.

== Fiction ==
Johan Lohe and Anna Lohe are both characters in the Catarina-book novel series by Olov Arvid Svedelid (1932-2008), which was published in seven parts between 1986–2004, starting with En Dufva i Stockholm ('A Dove in Stockholm'). In the series, the Lohe's act as the antagonists of the series protagonist heroine, Catarina, an orphan who managed to develop from the abused maid of the Lohe couple to become an independent businesswoman.

== Other sources ==
- Widding, Lars (1986) Lodjuren och silverskatten (Stockholm : Leijontornet/Victory) ISBN 9789178107988
