= 1806 in Sweden =

Events from the year 1806 in Sweden

Sweden in 1806 was marked by several political, military, and cultural developments during the reign of Gustav IV Adolf. Major events included Sweden’s defeat at Lübeck on 6 November during the Franco-Swedish War, the beginning of construction on the Södertälje Canal, and the closure of the Royal Swedish Opera and Royal Swedish Ballet by royal order. The steam engine was also introduced in Stockholm at the Eldkvarn gristmill, reflecting early industrialization in Sweden

== Incumbents ==
- Monarch – Gustav IV Adolf

== Events ==
- 6 November - Swedish defeat at Lübeck in the Franco-Swedish War.
- - The constructing of the Södertälje Canal begun.
- - The Royal Swedish Opera and the Royal Swedish Ballet are closed down by the King and remain closed until 1809.
- - The steam engine is introduced in Stockholm at the Eldkvarn gristmill.
- - Helena Ekblom becomes active as a preacher.

== Births ==
- 22 January - Ludvig Manderström, Swedish - Norwegian Minister of State for Foreign Affairs (died 1873)
- 1 July - Clara Bonde, courtier (died 1899)
- 14 August - Cecilia Fryxell, educator (died 1883)
- 4 November - Anders Selinder, ballet master (died 1874)
- Marie Kinnberg, photographer and painter (died 1858)

== Deaths ==
- 22 August - Conrad Quensel, naturalist (born 1767)
- - Christina Krook, educator (born 1742)
