= Eva Fundin =

Swedish stage actress and dancer

Eva Margareta Fundin (1777-1800) was a Swedish stage actress and dancer. She was the star attraction of the Gothenburg theatre and one of the most celebrated stage actors outside of the capital of Stockholm in her time.

Her parentage and background is unknown, which is not uncommon in actors of the time. Eva Fundin was engaged at the theatre company of Johan Anton Lindqvist in 1793-1800 and as such active at the Comediehuset in Gothenburg, which was staffed by Lindqvist in that period. She was a very popular attraction in Gothenburg, where other actors were unfavorably compared to her for many years after her death.

Fundin was active both as an actor and as a dancer. Among her roles where Eugenie in Klosteroffren by Monvel, Louise in Flickorna eller Vänskapen på prof, and foremost the role of Carolina in Den ädle Stråtröfwaren eller Wänskapen och Troheten, in which a critic was impressed enough by her performance to refer to her as "the only actress" of the theatre.

Eva Fundin died of the fever after having become ill from a cold caused by a draft in the theatre during the winter season of 1799–1800. During the same occasion, her colleagues Maria Deland and Charlotta Edberg also fell ill, making it difficult to keep the theatre going, and it was indeed closed later that year. Fundin was not married but left a son, Otto Mauritz (born in 1797).

The theatre critic Arvid Hummel wrote about her:

"Mamsell Fundin, who was the best we ever owned, pretty beautiful, and whose Nina came quite close to mamsell Säfström, and in several other roles was close to mamsell Fredrika Löf, joined within her a favorable comical talent with the most true feeling in tragedy and dance."

Johan Erik Brooman as well as Arvid Hummel wrote poems in honor of her after her death, and Brooman sang at her funeral.
