= 1738 in Sweden =

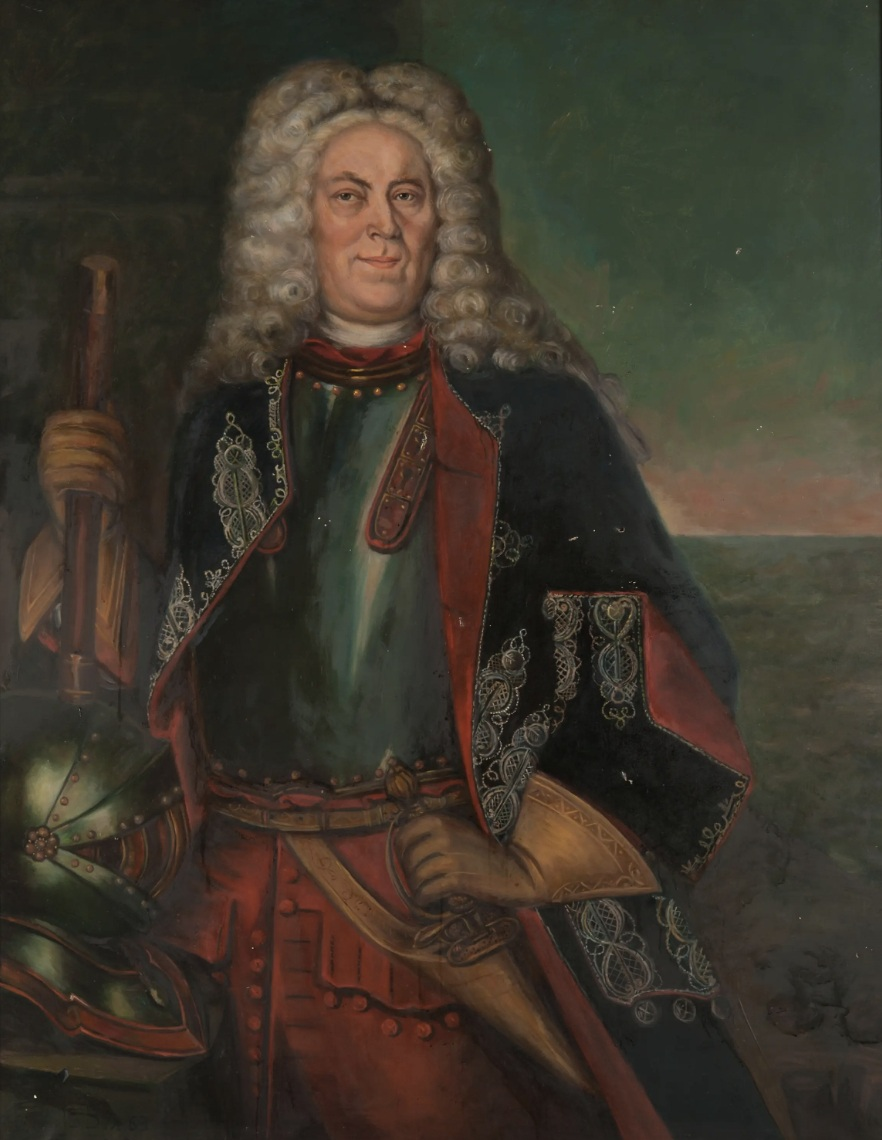
Gustaf von Psilander.

Events from the year 1738 in Sweden

== Incumbents ==
- Monarch – Frederick I

== Events ==
- 6 June - Premier of the Den Afwundsiuke by Olof von Dalin at Bollhuset in Stockholm.
- August - A treaty with France is made against the opposition of Arvid Horn.
- - Arvid Horn steps down as President of the Privy Council Chancellery.
- - The first ballet with professional native Swedish ballet dancers is performed at Bollhuset in Stockholm.
- - Premier of the Fru Rangsiuk by Reinhold Gustaf Modée at Bollhuset in Stockholm.
- - Ichthyologia by Peter Artedi
- - The Hats (party) and the Caps (party) is created.
- - The religious affair of Passionsspelen på Stora Bjurum
- - Samtal emellan Argi Skugga och en obekant Fruentimbers Skugga by Margareta Momma
- - The third Duellplakatet repeats the ban on dueling.

== Births ==
- June - Erika Liebman, poet (died 1803)
- 22 July - Nils Henric Liljensparre, police officer (died 1814)
- 17 December - Fredrika Eleonora von Düben, painter and Embroidery artist (died 1808)
- - Anna Sofia Ramström, courtier (died 1786)

== Deaths ==
- 26 February - Burchardt Precht, furniture maker and sculptor (born 1669)
- Gustaf von Psilander, admiral (born 1669)
- Anna Catharina von Bärfelt, royal favorite (born 1673)
- November 8 – Barbara Catharina Mjödh, poet (born 1776)
