= 1733 in Sweden =

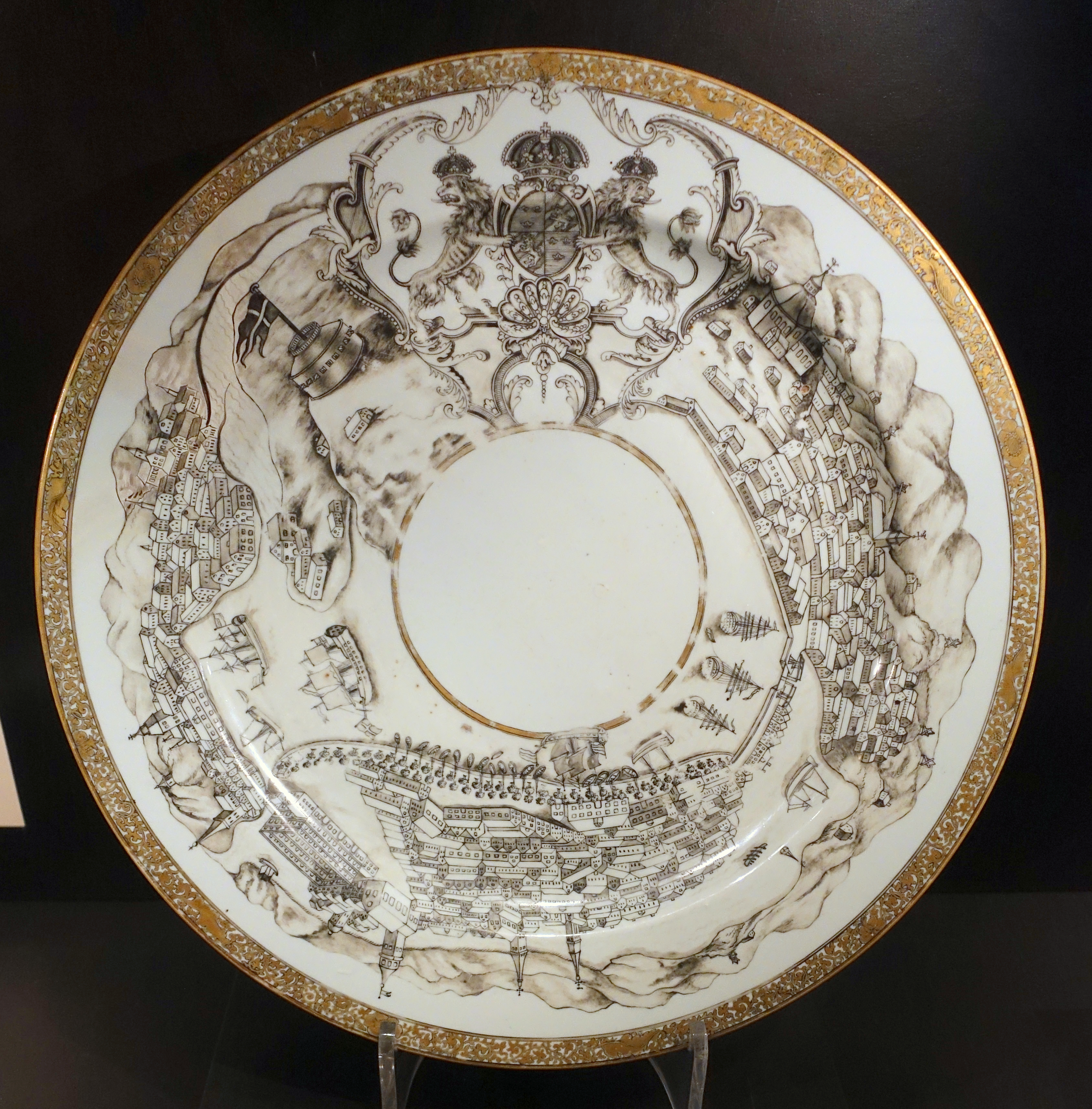
Dish with Stockholm scenes and Sweden's national coat of arms, China, Qing dynasty, Qianlong period, c. 1730 AD, porcelain - Östasiatiska museet, Stockholm - DSC09508

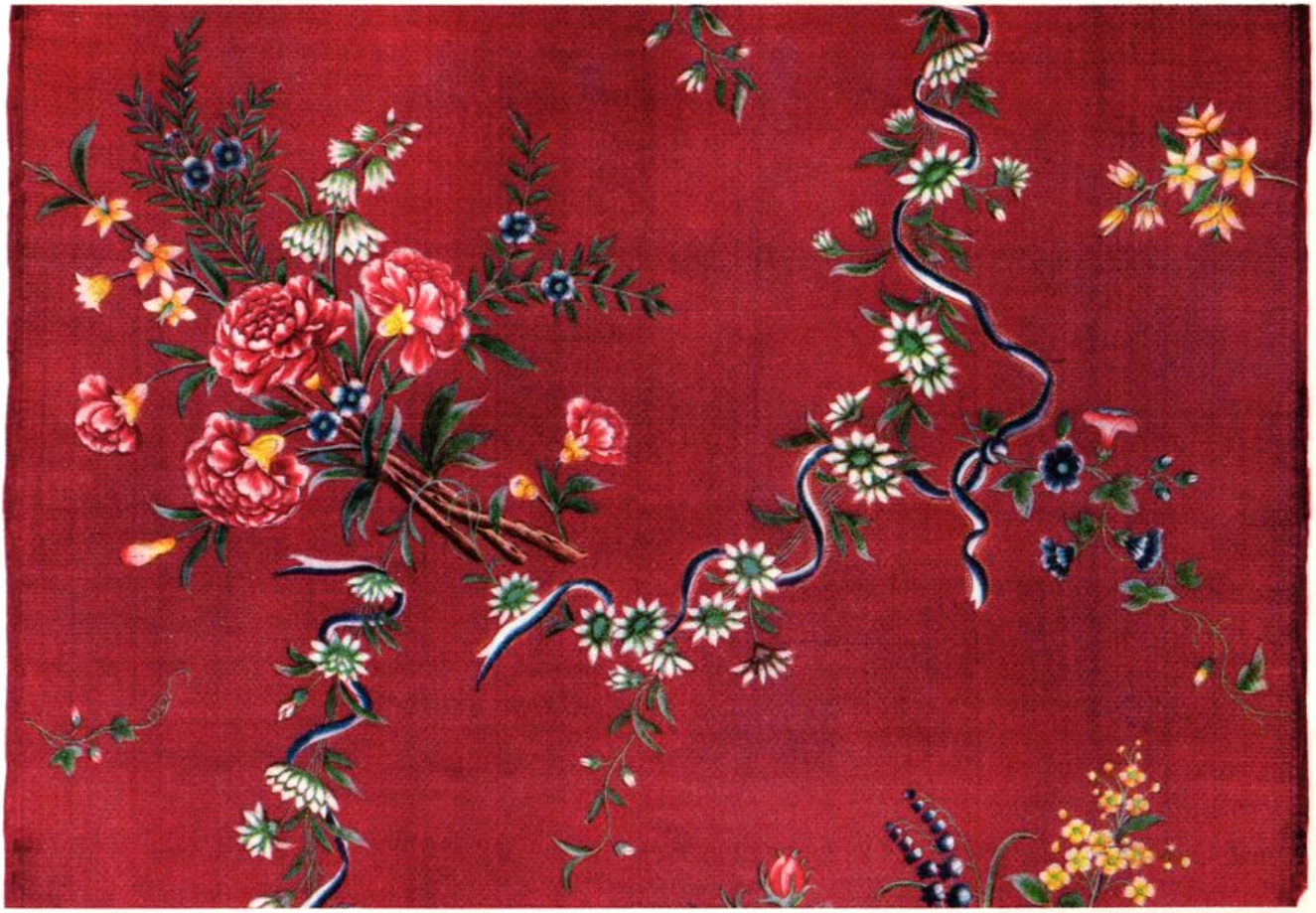

Events from the year 1733 in Sweden

== Incumbents ==
- Monarch – Frederick I

== Events ==
- 27 August - The first vessel of the Swedish East India Company return to Gothenburg in Sweden from China.
- - The last execution by Breaking wheel is performed.

== Births ==
- 15 October – Lisa Eriksdotter, charismatic (died year unknown)
- Johanna Löfblad, actress (died 1811)
- Anna Brita Sergel, artist (embroidery), an official decorator of the royal Swedish court (died 1819)
- Margaretha Zetterberg, textile artist (died 1803)
- Maria Magdalena Eek, pastry chef (died 1800)
- Lisbetta Isacsdotter, religious leader (died 1767)

== Deaths ==
- 16 February - Ulrika Eleonora Stålhammar, female soldier and cross dresser (born 1683)
- - Lovisa von Burghausen, noblewoman known for her slavenarrative (born 1698)
