= Margareta Christina Giers =

Swedish artist (1731–1796)

Margareta Christina Giers (1731 – 12 November 1796) was a Swedish painter.

She was born to vicar Eric Petter Giers and Brita Giring and married to professor Olof Murén. Most of her works are copies in gouache of paintings by the Old Masters.
