= Anna Lohe =

Swedish banker

Anna Lohe née Blume (1654 – 23 January 1731), was a Swedish banker.

== Life ==
She was the daughter of Tobias Blume, a pastry maker of the royal Swedish court, and Anna Techlin. She married Johan Lohe (1643-1704) in 1673, with whom she had eighteen children. Her husband was one of the richest people in Sweden and managed a trading company, a shipping business, a sugar refinery and ironworks. However, he became most known for his banking business as a moneylender, by which he acquired an enormous fortune and counted the king of Sweden among his clients; he was ennobled in 1703.

In 1704, Anna Lohe was widowed and took over the business of her late husband, including his banking business and his net of clients among the nobility and court. She was forced to defeat a contest of the will by her children, but won after four years. Considering the constant and growing great wealth of the family, she was evidently very successful. Anna Lohe was thus a prominent businesswoman and a powerful figure within Swedish financial life at the time, however, she is not often publicly mentioned. The Lohe banking family, in general, had a bad reputation and was described as "greedy, suspicious and not very scrupulous".

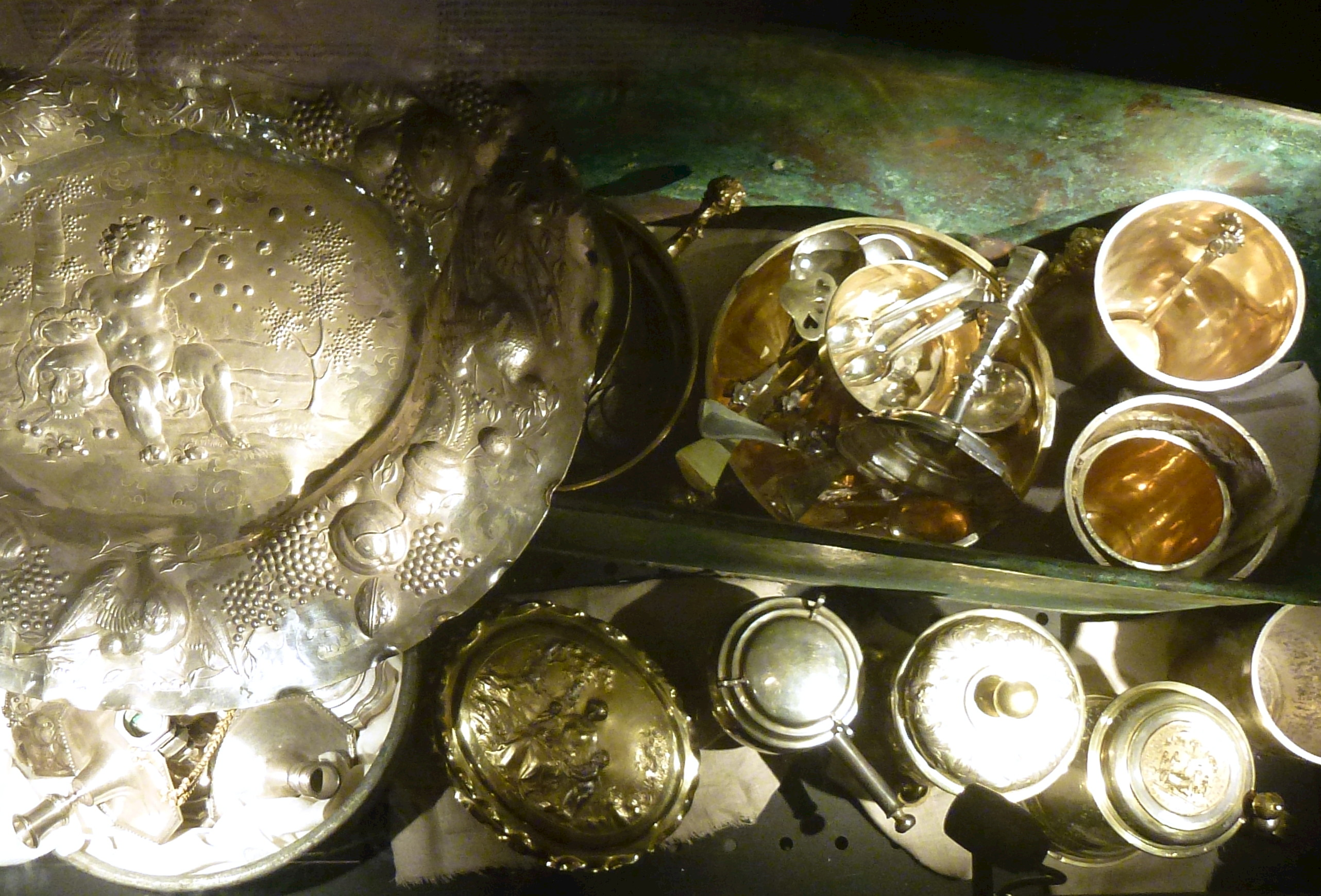
The so-called Loheskatten ('Lohe Treasure') found under the Lohe House in 1937

She lived with her two unmarried children Adolf Lohe (1683–1759) and Johanna Lohe (1690–1759) on Lilla Nygatan until her death. After her death, a new inheritance dispute took place between her children and continued for six years before it was settled. It was likely Adolf and Johanna Lohe who hid the great Lohe Treasure, a collection of gold and silver, under the floor of the house during the Dalecarlian rebellion (1743), which was famously excavated in 1937.

== Fiction ==
Johan Lohe and Anna Lohe are both characters in the Catarina-book novel series by Olov Svedelid, which was published in seven parts between 1986–2004, starting with En Dufva i Stockholm (A Dove in Stockholm). In the series, the Lohe's act as the antagonists of the series protagonist heroine, Catarina, an orphan who managed to develop from the abused maid of the Lohe couple to become an independent businesswoman.
