= Lisette Stenberg =

Swedish actress, singer and pianist (1770–1847)

- Born: Maria Elisabet Stenberg; 23 October 1770; Stockholm, Sweden
- Died: 18 June 1847 (aged 76); Vänersborg, Sweden
- Other name: Lisette Desvigné-Stenberg
- Spouse(s): Desvigné, a frenchman.

Caroline Lisette (Maria Elisabet) Stenberg (23 October 1770 in Stockholm or Gothenburg – 18 June 1847 in Vänersborg) was a Swedish stage actress, singer and pianist. She was a popular stage celebrity artist in Gustavian era Stockholm, and a star of the Stenborg Theatre. She was not only an actress but also a singer and a musician, and played piano forte between the acts.

== Life ==
Lisette Stenberg was born under the name Maria Elisabet Stenberg as the daughter of a custom inspector in Gothenburg, the narrative of her background was that she had initially run away from home with a lover, and when she was abandoned by him and her family would not accept her back, she took employment as the theater out of necessity: "Abandoned by her family, betrayed by her lover, the theatre became her only refuge, and in her despair she vowed to become the most extravagant actress that ever existed. Unfortunately, she kept her promise all too well."

=== Career at the Stenborg theater ===
Maria Elisabet Stenberg adopted the name of Lisette Stenberg, and was engaged at the Stenborg Theatre in Stockholm. The Stenborg Theatre, which was categorized as a boulevard theater by foreigners, was a not considered fashionable by the aristocracy, but was the most popular Stockholm theater among the public: it was said that while the nobility preferred the French Theater of Gustav III and the wealthy burghers the Royal Dramatic Theatre, the wider public frequented the Stenborg Theatre, which was very successful.

Lisette Stenberg was a multi talent and successfully active in the three capacities as an actress, singer and musician. Stenberg made her debut as an actress at the Stenborg Theatre in the Harlequinade Arlequin Favirot-sultaninna ('Favorite Sultaness of Harlequin') on 2 April 1789, and made an immediate success. As a debutante, her name was by custom not in the program, but the success prompted the press to acquire for her name and ask to see her again. In 1789, she also debuted as a pianist: while performing as an actress in the role of Countess Clainville in Det oförmodade vadet ('Unexpected bet') by Sedaine, she additionally surprised the audience by playing a clavichord sonata accompanied by a violinist from the orchestra. This made her recognized as a competent musician as well as an actress, and her musical performance was repeated on demand for the rest of the season. In 1794, finally, she made her debut as a singer at a concert at concert at Riddarhuset: also as a singer, she achieved acclaim by the audience. She also appeared as a singer onstage when performing in operettas.

As an actress she performed in both melodrama, tragedy and "higher comedy". Among her roles wherd Franciska in Minna von Barnhelm by Lessing (1793), Orgon in Tartuffe, Zemir in Zemir et Azor by Gretry, the main part inRosalie. In 1790, she became one of the first Swedish actresses known by name confirmed to have created a breeches role in the part of Count Razilli, and she is known as the first Swedish actress to play Cherubin in The Marriage of Figaro (play) (1792). Among her most known roles where the seductress in Den förförda ynglingen ('Seduced Youth') by Didrik Björn.

She was generally given very good reviews and acknowledged for her ability by both the critics and the audience, and was referred to by Gustaf Abraham Silverstolpe as "one of the greatest actresses the world have seen."

=== Private life ===
In parallel to her popularity as an artist, Lisette Stenberg was also known for the scandals of her private life, primarily for her financial affairs. Stenberg borrowed sizable sums without paying them back, made purchases by forging signatures - among others that of the theater director Carl Stenborg (who was known to give generous loans to his actors and never demand repayment) - and paid back loans by pawning borrowed items from others, acts which all placed her finances in chaos and placed her under scrutiny of the police. She made personal bankruptcy in 1789 and in 1794 and arrested in 1795, but was released on demand of her creditor and employer, Carl Stenborg, who pointed out that she as an unmarried woman was a minor in accordance with the Civil Code of 1734. Because of this, she was released from prison, but the debts she has accumulated stood, and she was arrested three times in 1796 for having pawned borrowed objects. In 1797, a performance was given in benefit of "one of the actresses, who always had the fortune to enjoy the flattering admiration from the audience as well as the proof of its support" - this actress was Stenberg, whose name was not revealed, as she was at that point again declared bankrupt.

The scandals of her financial affairs had no effect on her popularity. As a person, she was described as a confidant and strong young woman, and it was said of her that "her fame as an actress grew in parallel with her extravagance." The Stenborg Theater actually experienced an income drop when Lisette Stenborg was in Copenhagen during most of the year of 1798, and she was therefore reportedly welcomed back with relief by the theater direction despite her financial activities.

=== Later life ===
In 1798, the Royal Theater monopoly (the Royal Dramatic Theatre and the Royal Swedish Opera) was introduced, which banned all theaters except the royal theaters within the city borders of the capital, and as a consequence, the Stenborg Theater was closed after the season of 1798–99 and the entire staff lost their positions.

Some of the elite members of the Stenborg Theater, such as Eleonora Säfström, were engaged at the Royal Dramatic Theatre, but Lisette Stenberg was reportedly refused – not because of any doubt of her ability as an artist, but because of her financial scandals. Many of the remaining actors of the Stenborg Theater joined travelling theaters, and Lisette Stenberg is listed as one of the actors of the theater company of Johan Antong Lindqvist, when it performed in Gothenburg and Norrköping during 1800. During her performance in Comediehuset in Gothenburg that year, she was praised for her voice, her mimic, her posture and gesture by the critics, who claimed that "there is no possibility for any actress to perform the part better", and stated that she was worth all of the great applause she received in the capacity of a singer. Her last recorded performance was on 7 May 1800, in Norrköping.

In 1803, two women, one of whom is believed to have been Lisette Stenberg under the name Karolina Stenberg, were arrested in Stockholm suspected of vagrancy and prostitution, but it was not established if that was the case. In 1813, Lisette Stenberg is noted to have been active as a nurse in the Grande Armée in Hamburg. In 1816, she was arrested in Paris for having stolen clothes from the Swedish ambassador in France, Gustaf Lagerbjelke, in collaboration with his manservant, who was also known as a French spy. Stenberg was however released.

She returned to Sweden in the 1820s and lived in Vänersborg under the French name Madame Desvigné-Stenberg, claiming to be the widow of a Frenchman, and lived on a small pension from French Queen of Sweden Désirée Clary and by giving French lessons. She died in a poor house.
