= Maria Magdalena Eek =

Finnish chef (1733–1800)

- Born: 1733
- Died: 1800 (aged 66–67)
- Occupation: Pastry Chef
- Father: Henric Eek

Maria Magdalena Eek (1733 – 1800) was a Finnish pastry chef. Based in Turku, she had a successful career and was a notable artist within her trade, eventually being granted a Royal warrant of appointment.

== Biography ==
In 1782, she was given permission from the city authorities to manufacture and sell all forms of bread which was not included in the monopoly of the baker's guild, which in fact meant dessert bread such as cakes. She was given the permission granted to all women outside of the guilds: this entitled her to make and sell only what she had made with her own hands and only enough for her to support herself, which meant that she could not employ people in her business. She was also never registered as a baker, which makes the dates of her business difficult to trace. Despite these conditions, Eek managed to circumvent the restrictions: she supported not only herself but her sister and foster daughter, bought a house, had several assistants employed (which she referred to as only domestics) and had her pastries sold by sellers all over town. Her successes caused constant lawsuits from the members of the baker's guild during the 1780s.
