= Industrialization in Sweden =

Evolution of Sweden's mass production, rail, and telecommunications sectors

Industrialization in Sweden began during the second half of the nineteenth century. The industrial breakthrough occurred in the 1870s during the international boom period, and it carried on through the decades in response to the growing demand of the home market. By the end of this period, the first multinational companies based on advanced technology had emerged.

During the early phase of World War I in which Sweden remained neutral, the country benefited from increasing demand. However, with the German submarine war, Sweden was cut off from its markets, which led to a severe economic downturn. Between the world wars, major Swedish exports were steel, ball-bearings, wood pulp, and matches. Prosperity after World War II provided the foundations for the social welfare policies characteristic of modern Sweden.

Foreign policy concerns in the 1930s centred on Soviet and German expansionism, which stimulated abortive efforts at Nordic defence co-operation.

In 2016, the Swedish government reported that the industrial and industrial-services sectors accounted for 77 per cent of the country's exports, equivalent to almost 50 per cent of the total gross domestic product (GDP).

== Early 19th century ==
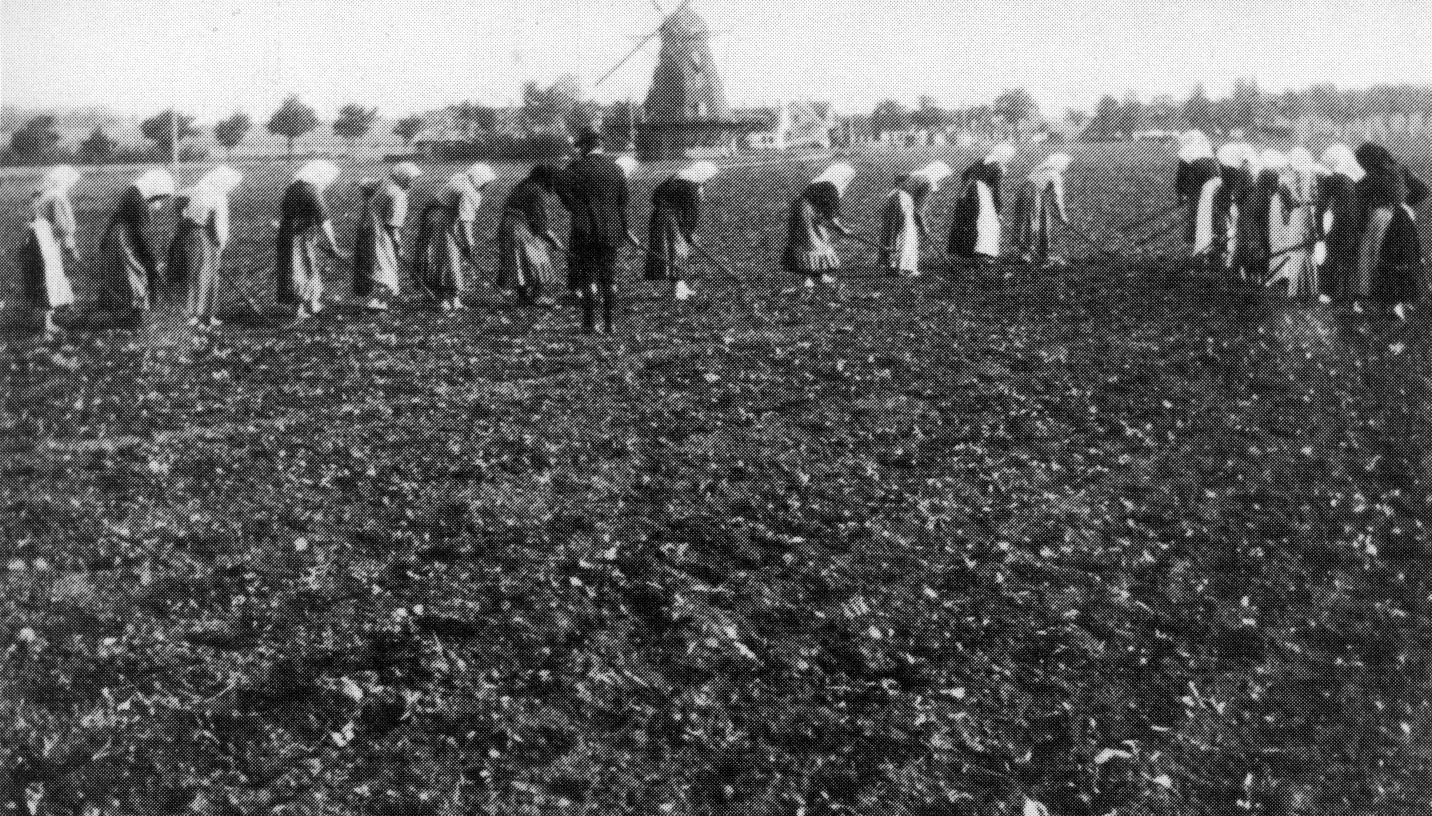
Swedish sugar beet plantation in the late 19th century at the Säbyholm estate in the south of Sweden.

In the early 1800s, Sweden's economy was predominantly rural and agricultural. However, the country's rich natural resources, particularly in iron ore, timber, and waterpower, provided the foundation for future industrial development. By the mid-19th century, Sweden's agricultural sector had begun to modernize, leading to a surplus in food production, which in turn supported population growth. This, coupled with increased urbanization, paved the way for the rise of industrial activity.

== Urbanization ==
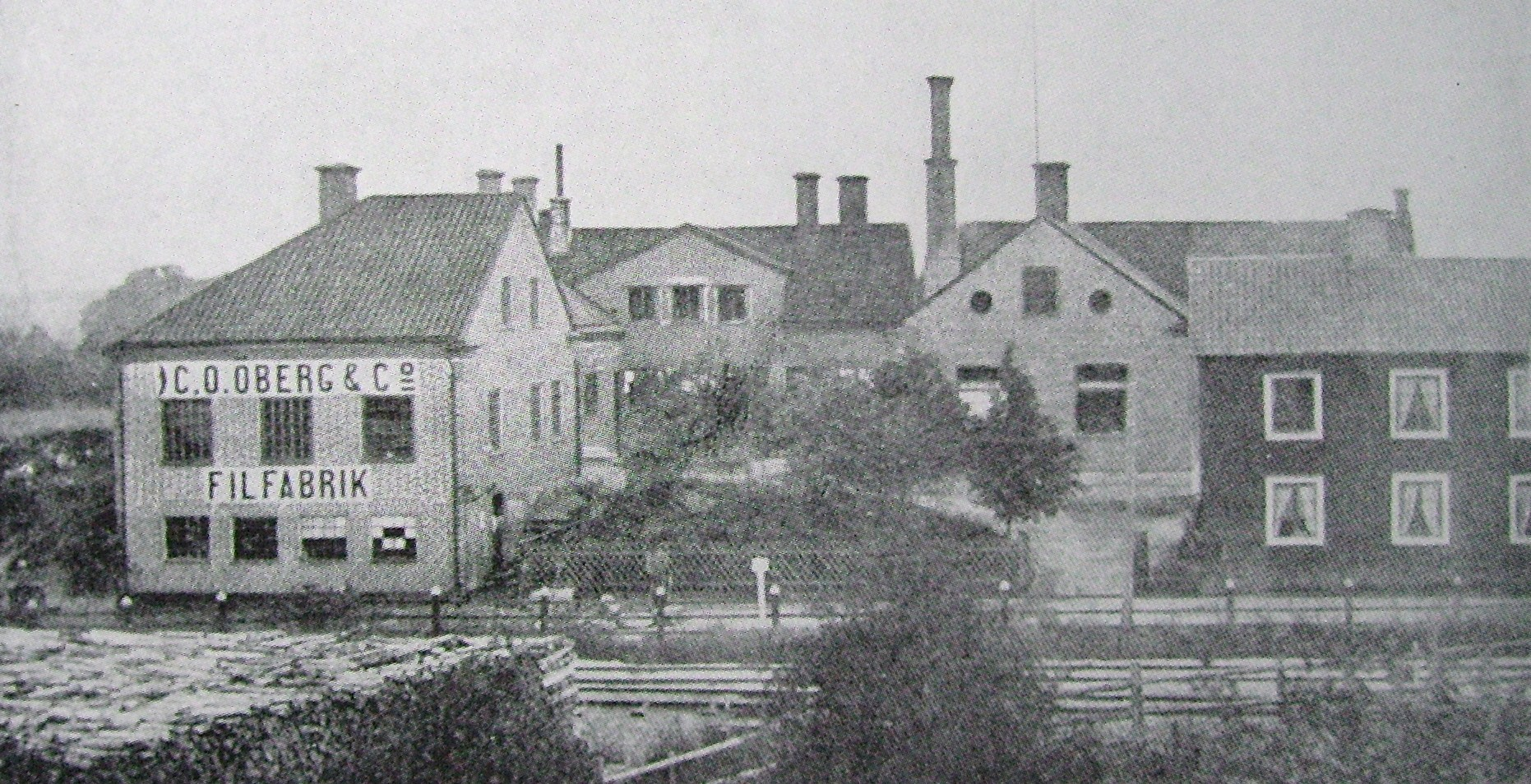
Photograph of Öbergs factory in Eskilstuna in the 1880s

Industrialization brought rapid urbanization, with thousands of people migrating from rural areas to cities in search of work. Cities like Stockholm, Gothenburg, and Malmö grew rapidly as they became industrial hubs. The working conditions in factories, however, were often harsh, leading to the rise of labor movements. Swedish workers organized into unions and demanded better wages, working hours, and conditions. This culminated in the formation of powerful labor organizations such as the Swedish Trade Union Confederation (LO) in 1898 which played a key role in advocating for labor rights.

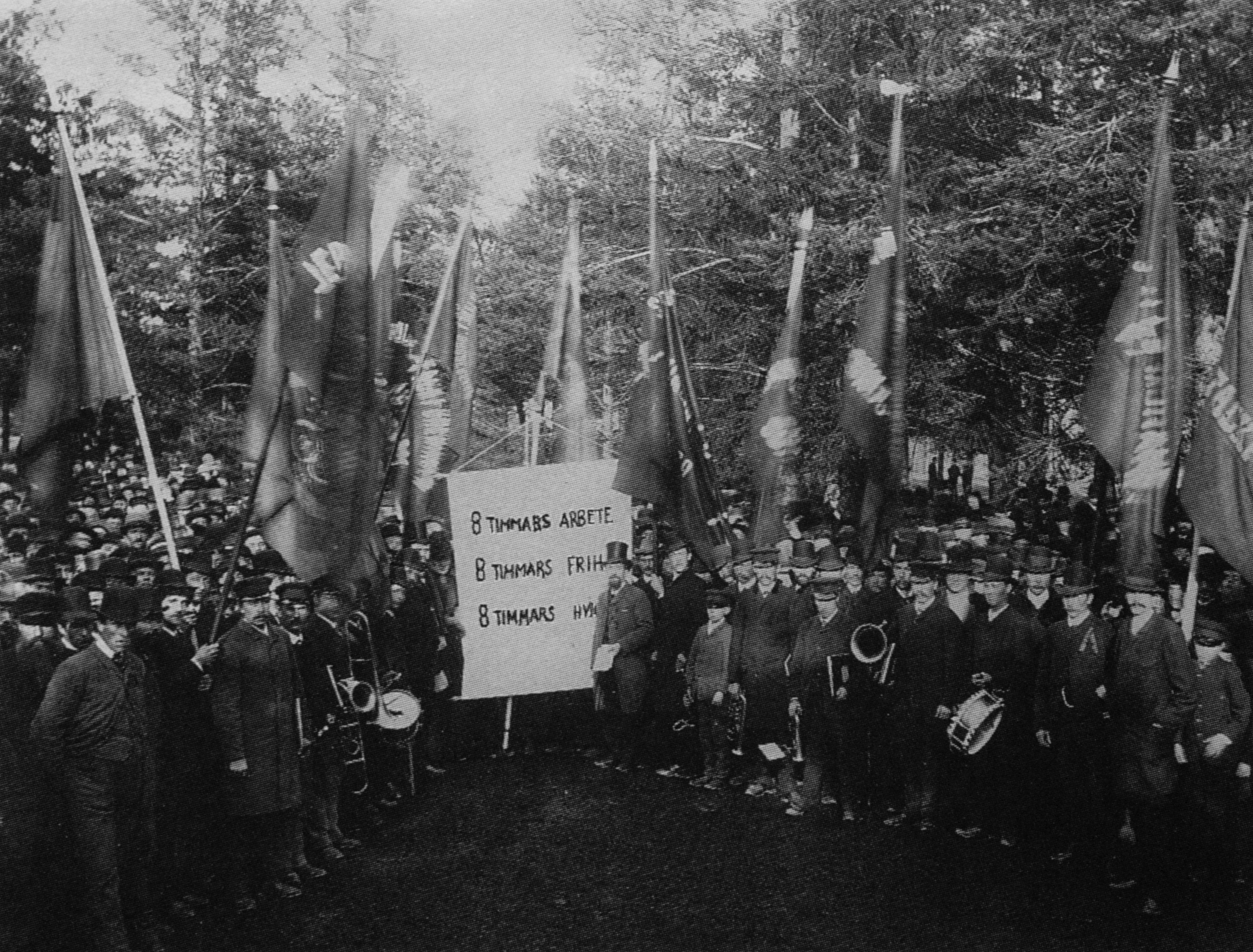
First of May 1890 in Sundsvall. The sign reads "8 hours of work, 8 hours of freedom, 8 hours of rest"

The rise of social democratic movements during the late 19th century, aligned with the growing labor force, contributed to significant political reforms. By the early 20th century, Sweden had begun to implement labor protections, including workplace safety regulations and limits on working hours.

=== Communications ===
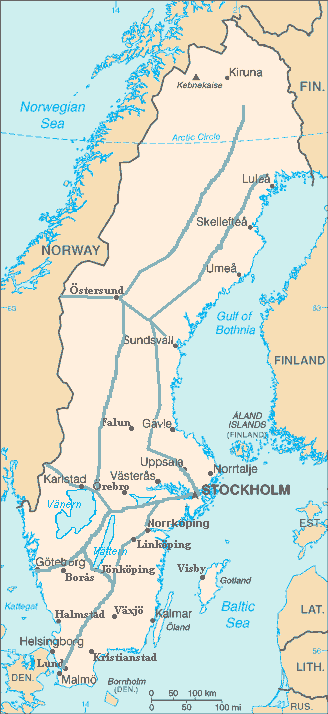
Main Line railways built in Sweden between 1860 and 1930.

The mainline railways (Swedish: stambanor), built and owned by the State, were of major importance for the development of Swedish industry and economy in general.

The two first main line railways, were the Southern Main Line, stretching from Stockholm to Malmö in the south, and the Western Main Line, from Stockholm to Gothenburg on the west coast. They were completed between 1860 and 1864. The Northern railways (East Coast Line, Northern Main Line & Main Line Through Upper Norrland) runs parallel to the Baltic coast up to Boden, in northern Sweden, and was finished in 1894. The Inland Line runs through the central parts of northern Sweden and was built between 1908 and 1937.

The construction of the early main lines provided a fast and safe connection from the mines in the north to the rest of Sweden. It also facilitated business (and private) travel, that had earlier required horse-driven carriages.

The Iron Ore Line (not a main line), from Luleå to Narvik in Norway, provided a highly efficient transportation linkage from the iron ores near Kiruna and Gällivare to harbours on both the Atlantic and the Baltic coasts. The sections of the Iron Ore Line were completed in stages between 1888 and 1903.

== Growth of key industries ==
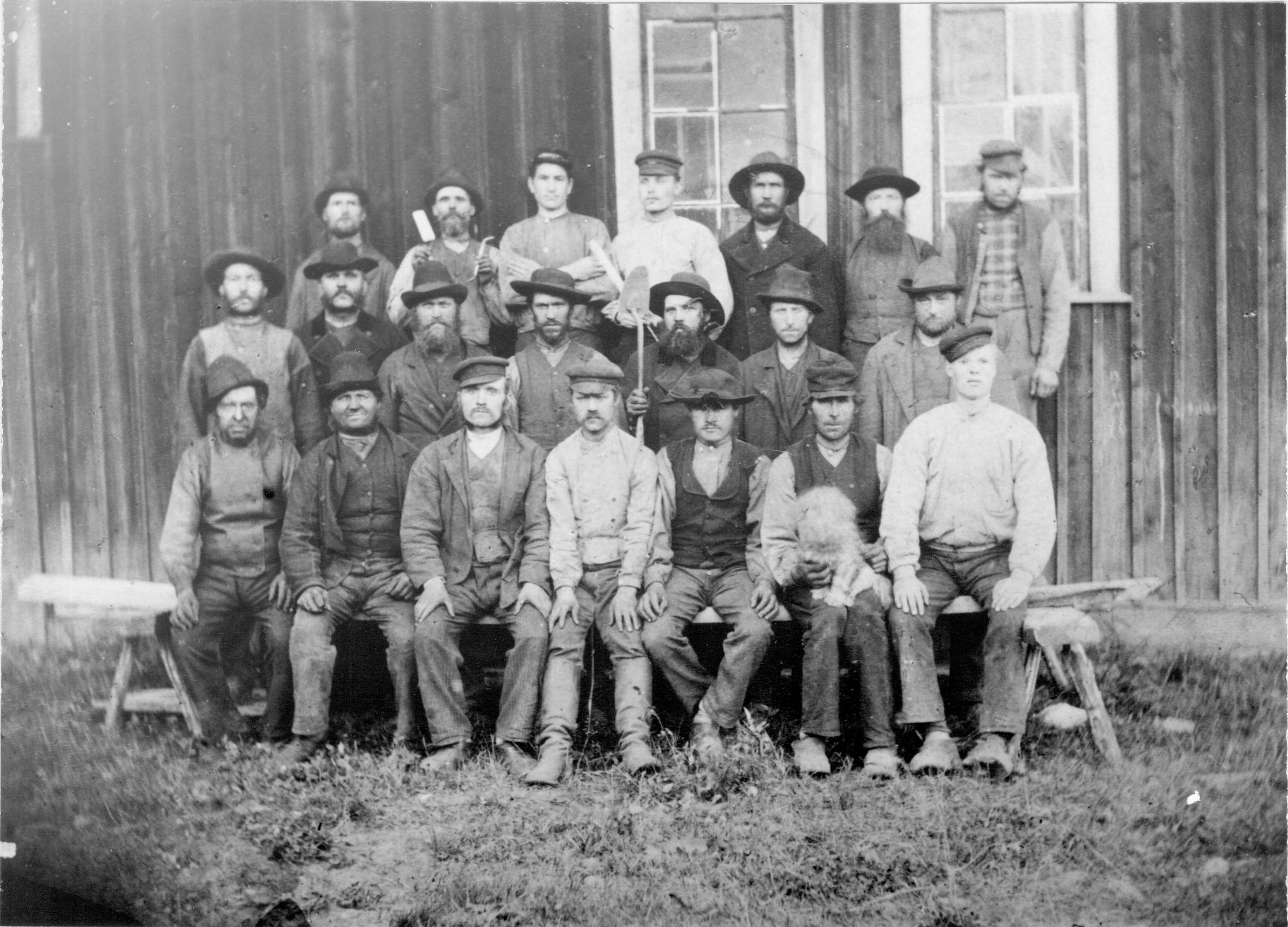
The workforce 1890 at the ironworks “Trummelsbergs bruk” in Fagersta Municipality in Västmanland, Sweden.

By the late 19th century, Sweden saw the rise of major industries and companies. Steel production became increasingly important as new technologies like the Bessemer process were introduced, allowing Sweden to refine its iron ore into high-quality steel, which became a key export. Companies like SKF, a leading producer of ball bearings, and ASEA (now ABB), specializing in electrical equipment, were founded during this time and played a vital role in Sweden's industrial landscape.

== See also ==
- Politics of Sweden
- Economy of Sweden
- Nordic Council
- Scandinavia
- Scandinavian defense union
- Foreign relations of Sweden
