= Maria Ersdotter =

Swedish woman executed for incest

Maria Ersdotter (1685 – 19 July 1721) was a Swedish woman executed for incest after having a child with her former stepson.

== Background ==
On 16 November 1720, Maria, the widow of the military furir Nils Dullfjär (d. 1718), gave birth to a child two years after the death of her husband. The child, a son, was weak and a priest was called upon to baptize it the day after. On his way to the farm, the mother of Maria told the priest that the father of the child was corporal Albrekt Nilsson Dullfjär, her 24-year-old former stepson; his mother had been the first wife of Maria's husband. When the priest arrived at the farm, he asked Maria who the father was. She did not wish to answer, but finally, he managed to make her admit that the father was her former stepson. The priest then forced her to repeat her confession; first to her relatives, and then in front of three other witnesses, before the child was baptized.

== Trial and execution ==
The 12 January 1721, Maria Ersdotter and Albrekt Dullfjär were put on trial for incest, a crime which during this period was still punishable by death. According to the law of religion, founded on the words of the Bible, it did not matter that they were in fact not blood relatives; relations by marriage were counted as equivalent to relations by blood, and therefore, Maria and Albrekt were to be judged as if they were biologically mother and son.

Maria's maids testified that Albrekt, during his leave of absence from the army, often wanted to stay on the farm of his former stepmother, and that they seemed to be in love with each other, and even slept in the same bed occasionally, though, as one maid said; "Yes, you could plainly see that they wanted to be with each other, but could not because of their ties"; Maria and Albrekt were both, as it seemed, well liked. Albrekt himself answered that although he might have shared bed with Maria "in youthful vanity", they had not done more than that. The court decided to take a pause so that Albrekt could be interrogated by two priests. When he returned, he confessed with the words, "Be that as it may, I admit that it is true."

The court judged Maria and Albrekt guilty of incest and sentenced them to death in keeping with the penalty prescribed for the offense in verse 11 chapter 20, of the biblical Book of Leviticus. The sentence was confirmed by the high court, and the 19 July 1721, Maria and Albrekt were executed together by decapitation.

== Context ==
In the 18th century, people were still executed for incest even when they were not related by blood, because relations by marriage were considered by religious criteria to be equivalent to blood relatives. There was a similar case in Västmanland, where Brita Johansdotter ran away from her husband with her stepson Mats, four years younger than herself, in 1739; they lived in the wilderness together until they were captured, put on trial in Västerås and decapitated in 1741. Sexual relationship with all kinds of in-laws were considered incestuous by the church: Oluf Svensson and the wife of his uncle, Anna Olufsdotter, were executed in 1704, Erik Ohlsson and his sister-in-law Karin Andersdotter were executed in 1721, Dordi Rasmusdotter and her brother-in-law in 1724, and as late as 1797 Caisa Larsdotter was decapitated for having sex with her father-in-law.
