= Ulrika Melin =

Swedish artist (1767–1834)

- Born: 1767
- Died: 1834 (aged 66–67)
- Known for: Textile art
- Spouse: Peter Thure Gerhard Drufva (m. 1788)

Ulrika Melin (1767–1834) was a Swedish textile artist and a member of the Royal Swedish Academy of Arts.

She was born to Major Lars Melin and was a sister of General Major Henrik Georg Melin. She was married to the governor of Västerås Castle, Peter Thure Gerhard Drufva, in 1788. Melin was a textile artist with "an unusual ability to sew landskapes". In 1784, she was elected to the Royal Swedish Academy of Fine Arts for a work in white sateen inspired by the work of Claude Lorrain.

== See also ==
- Wendela Gustafva Sparre
- Maria Johanna Görtz
