= Hedvig Sirenia =

Hedvig Sirenia or Hedvig Sirenius, sometimes known as Hedvig Schultzen, (1734 - 1795) was a Swedish poet and translator during the Swedish Age of Liberty, who wrote under the name "Sirenia". She was a member of the Kungliga Vetenskaps- och Vitterhetssamhället i Göteborg (The Royal Society of Science and Literature in Gothenburg).

She was the daughter of Sigfrid Sirenius who was an influential civil servant in Gothenburg. She married the physician Matthias Gottlieb Schultz (or Schultzen) (1727-1800), with whom she had a son. Her spouse had been forced to retire in 1771 when he became blind.

She was regularly published in the press in Gothenburg from 1760 onward and was compared to Hedvig Charlotta Nordenflycht and called "The Sappho of Gothenburg" and "Our Sirén" (in reference to her name). In 1759, she was inducted into Witterhets Klubben (The Erudite Literary Society), and in 1778 she was elected a member of the successor of that society, The Royal Society of Science and Literature in Gothenburg. There were a few other female members, but Sirenia was the only one whose writings were published by the society: her poem "Herdedigt" (a translation of a French poem) was selected for publication in the society's annals of 1780, and her translation of the Danish tragedy Ejnar Tambaskjelfwer (about the Norwegian 11th-century nobleman Einar Thambarskelfir) was published in the 1782 edition. She also translated other foreign plays.
