= Christina Church =

Coordinates: 57.7819°N 14.1792°E

- Kristine kyrka
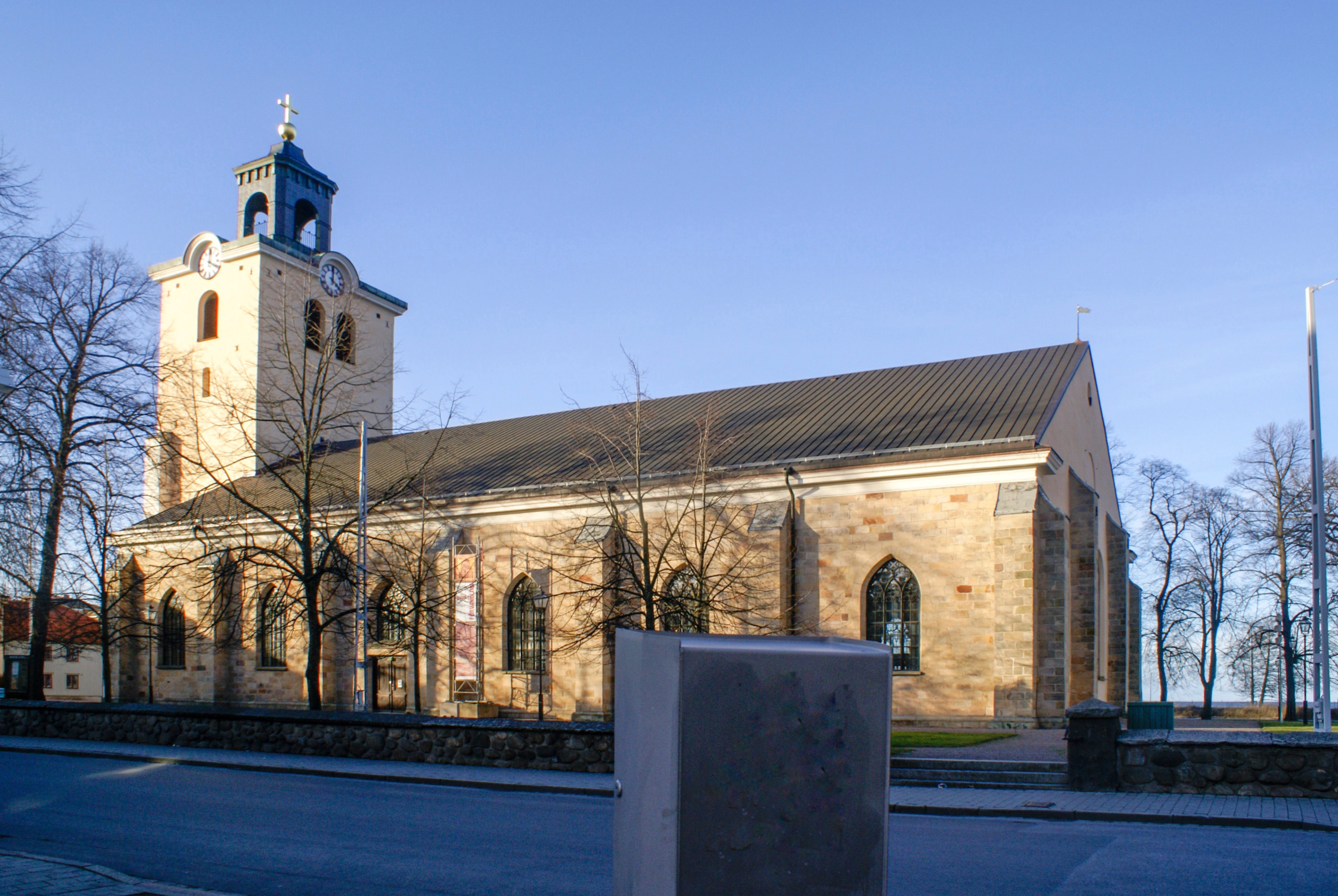
- Christina Church
- Christina Church
- Location: Jönköping
- Country: Sweden
- Denomination: Church of Sweden

History
- Consecrated: 20 April 1673

Administration
- Diocese: Växjö
- Parish: Jönköping Christina-Ljungarum

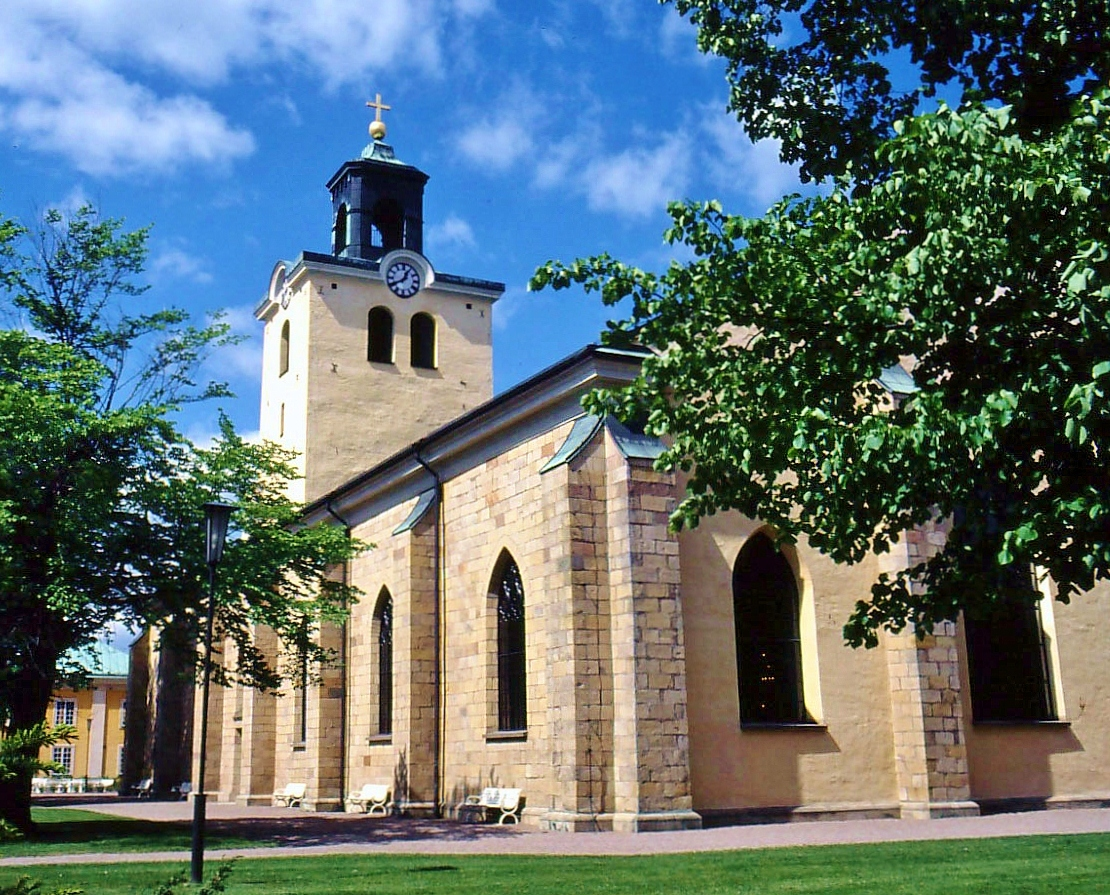
Christina Church

The Christina Church (Swedish: Kristine kyrka) is a church building in eastern Jönköping in Sweden. Belonging to Jönköping Christina-Ljungarum Parish of the Church of Sweden, it was opened on 20 April 1673.
