= Barbara Catharina Mjödh =

Finnish poet

Barbara Catharina Mjödh (8 November 1738 – 1776) was a Finnish poet. She was born to the vicar and politician Abraham Mjödh (died 1786) and Magdalena Ross. Mjödh wrote of great occasions in peoples' lives, such as weddings and funerals. In 1754, she published her funeral poem of Anna Gerdzlovia. She was praised for her talent, but her career is regarded to have been severely subdued because of her marriage.
