= 1732 in Sweden =

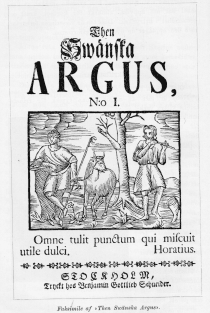
Den Svenska Argus December 13, 1732

Events from the year 1732 in Sweden

== Incumbents ==
- Monarch – Frederick I

== Events ==
- 12 May to 10 October - Carl Linnaeus performs the Expedition to Lapland.
- 26 September – Peace treaty between Sweden and Poland.
- December – The paper Then Swänska Argus begin its publication.
- - The first Swedish East Indiaman is sent by the newly established Swedish East India Company to China.

== Births ==
- 6 September - Johan Carl Wilcke, physicist (died 1796)
- 18 November - Pehr Hilleström, painter (died 1816)
- - Maria Christina Bruhn, inventor (died 1802)
- - Hedvig Catharina De la Gardie, courtier (died 1800)

== Deaths ==
- - Lars Ulstadius, pietist (born 1650)
- Jonas Lambert-Wenman, pirate (born 1665)
