= Eleonora Säfström =

Swedish opera singer

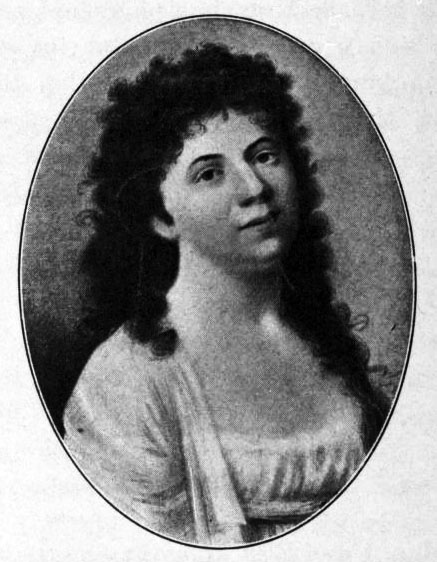
Eleonora Säfström

Ulrika Eleonora Säfström (9 October 1770 – 9 June 1857) was a Swedish stage actress, described as a great dramatic star of Stockholm in her day. She was used for heroine parts and was also popular in operettas.

== Biography ==
Säfström was born in Stockholm, Sweden. She was the daughter of Johan Fredrik Säfström and Brita Christina Lindholm and twin sister of Eva Säfström.

She and her twin sister Eva were employed in the choir of the Royal Swedish Opera in 1785. In 1787, she debuted at the Stenborg Theatre. She was described as a fairy-like beauty with a voice that "cuddled the ear", and was anticipated to become one of the "greatest ornaments" of the theatre. She did meet with success, and in the following years, she was given a great repertoire of leading roles which generally received good reviews. She was called the "first actress" of the theatre and was placed by the side of Lisette Stenberg as one of the two leading ladies of the theatre.

She played Susanna in The Marriage of Figaro opposite Didrik Gabriel Björn (1757-1810) at the Swedish premier performance of this play on 20 December 1792. She also played the title role in Minna von Barnhelm by Gotthold Ephraim Lessing in 1793. Her most acclaimed parts were the title roles in Nina (1792) and Azemia (1793). As the mentally ill Nina, she was called "irresistibly touching", and "As the heroine of the play one of the most excellent actresses the Stenborg Theatre ever owned."

In 1788, a poem was published in the paper Stockholmsposten:

To Mademoiselle Eleonora Säfström, when she was at the new Swedish Theatre performing in the opera Colonien Belinde on the 23rd May. At the waves of the sea, shocked and frightened /in a poor costume and ornament/You stood at the naked line of the sea/mourned your freedom with the obedience/which is always expected by cruelty/Alack as your song shared my pride!/I beg you - act as you did/ so as to once more delight me.

The writer is believed to have been Carl Michael Bellman (1740–1795).

She admired King Gustav III of Sweden, and she was present at the masquerade ball where he was assassinated in 1792.

In 1795 she debuted at the Royal Dramatic Theatre, where she was given a contract in 1796. She had several big parts with good reviews, but the competition was much greater at the Royal Theatre, and she did not take the same role of a star there. She gave her last performance in 1802. Shortly afterwards, she was injured in the head by a falling block of ice, which caused her a "nerve illness". After she recovered in 1806, she was fired and denied a pension. In 1807, she moved in with her married twin sister in Ystad, where she founded a school.

== Personal life ==
At the age of seventeen, she was to have been engaged to Count F. Posse, who died young; his letters were buried with her on her request. She died unmarried during 1857 in Ystad.
