= 1737 in Sweden =

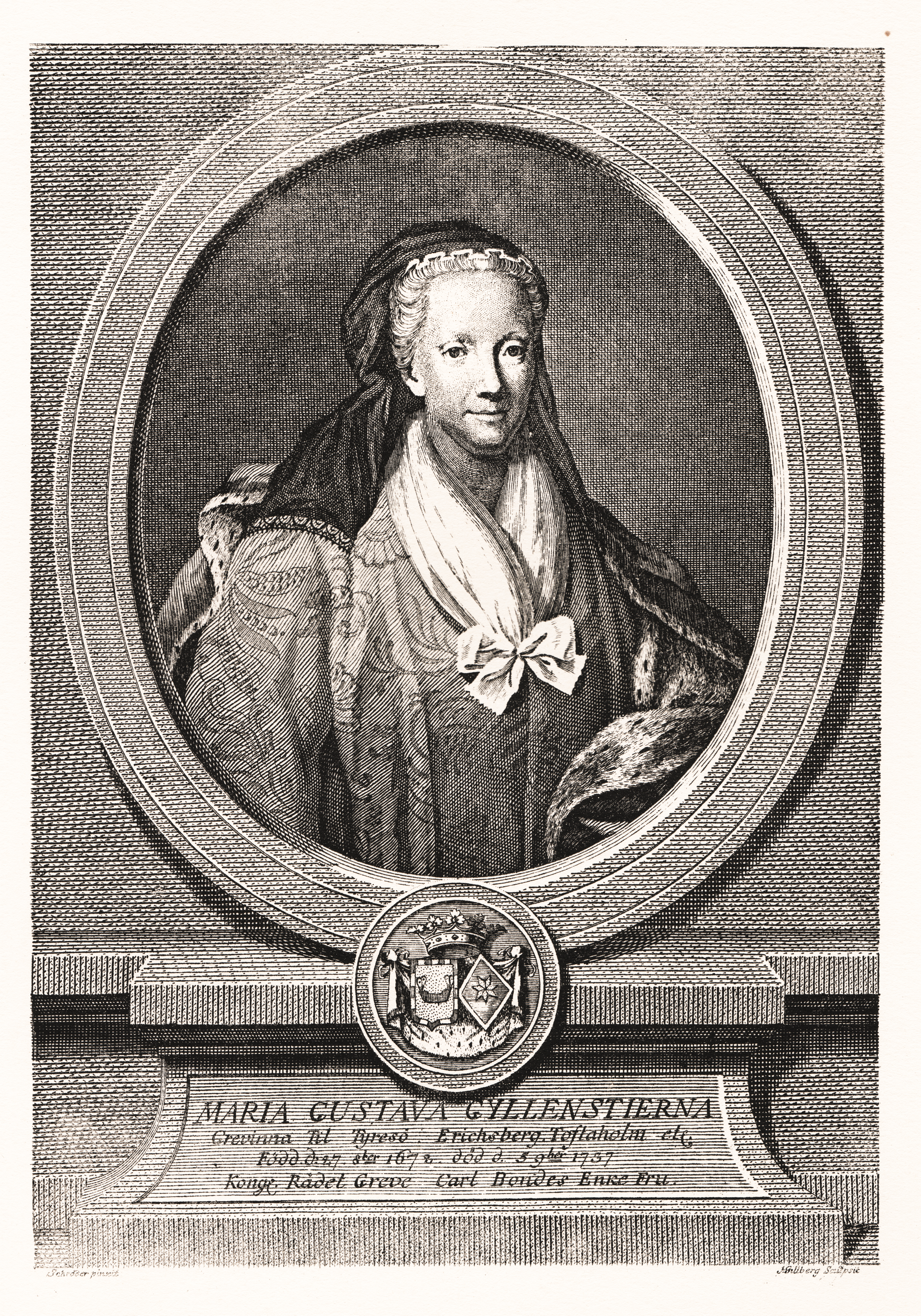
Maria Gustava Gyllenstierna. Engraving by Jacob Gillberg.

Events from the year 1737 in Sweden

== Incumbents ==
- Monarch – Frederick I

== Events ==
- 4 October - The first professional Swedish language theatre is inaugurated at Bollhuset in Stockholm by the first group of professional Swedish stage actors, playing a translated French play.
- October - The first Swedish satire play, Svenska Sprätthöken by Carl Gyllenborg, is performed at the Swedish theatre at Bollhuset with Beata Sabina Straas and Peter Lindahl.

== Deaths ==
- 3 June - Gustaf Cronhielm, politician (died 1664)
- - Maria Gustava Gyllenstierna, writer and translator
