= Lars Roberg =

Swedish physician and naturalist (1664–1742)

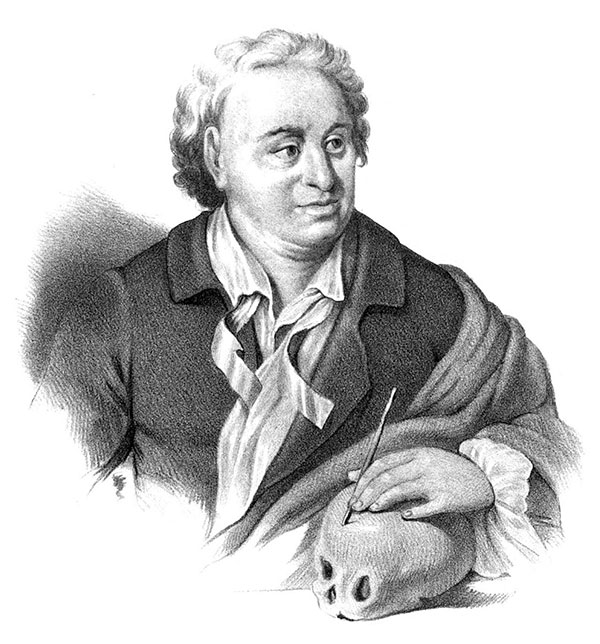
Lars Roberg.

Lars Roberg (4 January 1664 – 21 May 1742) was a Swedish physician and natural science researcher. He served as a professor of anatomy and medicine at Uppsala University.

== Biography ==
Roberg was born in Stockholm, Sweden. He was the son of the royal apothecary Daniel Roberg. He matriculated at Uppsala University at a young age in 1675, and left for a long foreign journey in 1680 to Germany, France and England, during which he studied at the University of Wittenberg and University of Leiden. He completed his doctorate in medicine at Leiden in 1693. He became a professor of anatomy and practical medicine at Uppsala University in 1697 and retained the chair until 1740. Lars Roberg was the teacher of Carl Linnaeus and Peter Artedi.

In 1708, he founded a clinic for the purpose of facilitating the practical education of medical students. Nosocomium academicum at Oxenstiernska huset in Uppsala would later be merged into the Uppsala University Hospital.

== Teaching reforms and publications ==
Roberg helped move Swedish medical training from lecture hall to bedside. In 1708 he persuaded the university consistory to let students accompany him on ward rounds in the Nosocomium academicum (university hospital), making Uppsala the first Nordic school to introduce compulsory clinical clerkships. His work Praxis medica empirica (1715) compiled case notes from those sessions, emphasising direct observation over Galenic authority and recommending cinchona bark rather than bloodletting for intermittent fevers.

== Anatomical work ==
An enthusiastic dissector, he obtained a royal privilege (1698) that obliged city magistrates to deliver executed criminals to the university anatomy theatre; the resulting preparations were illustrated in his folio Icones organorum corporis humani (1701), plates from which were still used by Linnaeus four decades later. Roberg also coined Swedish terms such as hjärtöra ("auricle of the heart") and hjärnhinna ("meninges"), many of which entered Dalin's dictionary (Ordbok öfver svenska språket, 1734).

== Later years ==
Elected prorector of Uppsala University in 1728, he argued—unsuccessfully—for a separate medical faculty, but did secure state funding to expand the botanical garden that would later be tended by Linnaeus. Upon the founding of the Royal Swedish Academy of Sciences (1739) he was among the first eight ordinary members and chaired the medicine section until his death in 1742. He died in Uppsala.
