= Lisbetta Isacsdotter =

Swedish ecstatic preacher

Lisbetta Isacsdotter (1733–1767), was a Swedish ecstatic preacher, known as the Solvarf Angel. She was a peasant girl who experienced a coma in 1750, and having regained consciousness, started to preach. Between 1750 and 1762, Lisbetta Isacsdotter preached to a growing crowd of pilgrims, who came from far away to the farm of her parents. She claimed to be channelling angels, preached in a babbling voice, and her mother claimed she lived only on a spoon of milk each day. She became famous in her day. In 1762, she was investigated by the authorities and she and her parents were punished for fraud. In 1765, she was taken to an asylum.
