= Helena Maria Ehrenstråhle =

Swedish noblewoman and poet

Helena Maria Ehrenstråhle (1760–1800) was a Swedish noblewoman and poet.

She was the daughter of noble colonel Hans Ehrenstråhle and Maria Elisabeth Uggla and married in 1791 to the writer Jonas Carl Linnerhielm. She published a collection of poems, "Vitterhetsförsök" (1793). It consisted of both prose and poetry with "sentimental-moral contents" in the then popular Gessner-style.

== Sources ==
- Helena Maria Ehrenstråhle i Wilhelmina Stålberg, Anteckningar om svenska qvinnor (1864)
- Gabriel Anrep, Svenska adelns Ättar-taflor, volym 1, s. 699
