= Catharina Bröms =

Swedish ironmaster

Catharina "Karin" Bröms (1665–1735), was a Swedish ironmaster. She was the owner of the Wij iron works at Ockelbo between 1686 (formally 1708) and 1735. She founded and acquired additional iron works and eventually owned the larger part of Ockelbo and its parish. Bröms was a successful industrialist who managed to avoid the economic depression in the iron industry during the Great Northern War and became known as "Her Grace at Wij".

Bröms was the daughter of Sven Bröms, founder of the Wij iron works at Ockelbo, and Catharina Helleday. She married first in 1680 to the noble Johan Silfverklou, who bought the iron works from her father in 1685. Upon his death in 1686, she became its owner, though it came to be formally owned by marriage to her second spouse, Carolus Carlsson, Bishop of Västerås. Upon the death of her second spouse in 1708, she formally became the owner of the iron works.

Catharina Bröms came to manage the Ockelbo iron works from 1686 until her death. She was also the business partner of her sister Elisabeth "Lisa" Bröms, who was also active as an ironmaster. During the tenure of her spouse as bishop, Bröms and her sister were also involved in the affairs of appointments to local clerical offices. The local folksong »om biskop Karin, domprost Lisa och gubben själv» ('About Bishop Karin, Vicar Lisa and the old man himself') has been interpreted as criticism of the sister's involvement in such affairs.
