= Jonas Lambert-Wenman =

Swedish pirate

Jonas Lambert-Wenman (c. 1665–1732) was a Swedish pirate. He was active as a privateer in the Caribbean in Dutch service. He came in possession of a fortune, which became the subject of a famous inheritance dispute between his nephews and nieces. The inheritance dispute came to be the subject of a novel by Carl Jonas Love Almqvist Smaragdbruden ('Emerald Bride').
