= Maria Elisabet Öberg =

Finnish artist (1734–1808)

Maria Elisabet Öberg (1734 - 1 February 1808 in Pälkäne) was a Finnish weaver and textile artisan, considered a pioneer in the textile industry. She was the head of a textile mill for years (1757-1766), where she became known for the high quality of the processing of flax she taught to students.

Maria Elisabet Öberg was born to a Swedish sergeant. She was educated in flax processing at Vadstena flaxen factory. When she finished her training in 1756, she was given a price for her accomplices in the profession in Stockholm, as it was Swedish policy at the time to encourage the textile industry and knowledge within the trade. The following year, she was employed as the head of the textile mill of Hans Henrik Boije in the province of Finland, which also functioned as a textile school with both male and female students. Her students were to become known for their ability and several of them were awarded in Stockholm for their achievements. In 1764 she married her colleague, the textile teacher Mikael Mengalin (1731-1794), with whom she had three daughters and a son. The couple left their position when the school was closed in 1766, but continued to teach. Maria Elisabet Öberg was a respected educator in contemporary Sweden (with Finland).
