= Maria Christina Bruhn =

Swedish chemist and inventor

Maria Christina Bruhn (1732 – 21 October 1808) was a Swedish chemist and inventor, likely to be the first patented female inventor of her country. She created a gunpowder packaging that would later be used in the Swedish army for several generations.

== Early life ==
Bruhn was the eldest of three daughters of the book printer Johan Bruhn (died 1742). She took over a tapestry and wallpaper manufacture after the death of her widowed mother Inga Christina in 1751, who was granted a license from the Swedish Board of Trade that allowed her to create the tapestry manufacturing business Maria would take over. The town surveyor Hieronymus von der Burg, one of the botanist Carl von Linné’s apprentices, and Maria's sister Ingrid had formed a relationship that resulted in a pregnancy followed by marriage. This relationship gave Maria the opportunity to create a network with some of the elites of Stockholm. Included in this network of elites were Nils Lindblom, professor of mathematics for the artillery, and Pehr Lehnberg. Both of these professors were members of the Royal Swedish Academy of Science, and worked in the military.

In 1773, after nine years, the Swedish King offered a 6000 dealer copper reward to anyone who can create the best packaging for gunpowder. The judges of this competition were the members of the Royal Academy of Sciences. Maria experimented with this and created cartridges out of paper and then varnished. On March 2, 1774, she presented her idea to the Royal Academy of Science, where the cartridges were test fired under the supervision of Major General Charpentier. Maria's cartridge left residue in the cannon which blocked the barrel. Though this can be fixed, woollen material would still be needed to cover the end of the cartridge. Maria's competition was Major Per Gustaf Wagenfel, who also presented a similar idea, but also her being a woman raised skepticism against her invention from the men of the academy. Since both inventions were not completely successful, the project was abandoned.

== Career ==
After the competition, Maria continued to deliver the updated version of her varnished cartridges at her own expense, to the artillery cadets for their military exercises, and this was up until 1780. Maria was successful until problems began to arise. Major Per Gustaf Wagenfelt, who was also at the competition, obtained a royal salary of 500 riksdaler for inventing varnished cartridges. He had stolen Maria's design and was claiming it as his own. Captain Lindfelt recognized the design as Maria's and protested this to the military board. Maria also became aware of this and wrote to the War Office in 1783, claiming her rightful ownership to her design and the prize money.

An investigation began. Many of those involved began to feign ignorance, because they didn't want to be known as the people who ruined the reputations of the important figures of that time. This however did not stop Maria, who continued to fight for her design through letters, claims, and counterclaims. Finally in August 1786, the military board declared that Maria's invention was the best and most affordable, and therefore she had won the competition.

== Awards ==
On May 08, 1787, Maria was awarded half of the prize money, which was 166 riksdaler and 32 shillings in coins out of the total 333 riksdaler and 16 shillings. She is also considered to be the first patented female inventor of her country.

== Death ==
After receiving her prize money, Maria closed her wallpaper workshop and returned to her private life, which she lived on the prize money she had received.

She died on October 20, 1808, at the age of 77.
