= Carl Schylander =

Swedish actor

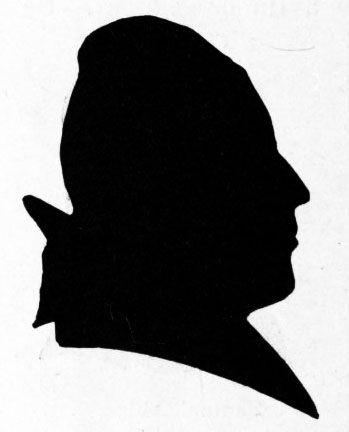
Silhouette of Carl Schylander

Carl Schylander (1748–1811), was a Swedish stage actor.

He belonged to the elite of the pioneer generation actors of the Royal Dramatic Theatre (Dramaten). He was noted for his roles in comedies. It is as a comedian in women's roles he was most popular. He was first employed at the Dramaten in 1787. He was also the Inspector of the Dramaten and handled its accounting. He played at the Stenborg Theater in 1790. He was married to stage actress Ebba Morman (1769 1802). They married in 1802 shortly before her death.

== Other sources ==
- Nordensvan, Georg, Svensk teater och svenska skådespelare från Gustav III till våra dagar. Förra delen, 1772–1842, Bonnier, Stockholm, 1917
