= Margareta Sofia Lagerqvist =

Swedish opera singer

- Born: 1771
- Died: 6 June 1880 (aged 108–109)
- Genres: opera
- Instrument: vocals

Margareta Sofia Lagerqvist (1771 – 6 June 1800, in Norrköping) was a Swedish opera singer and stage actress.

She was employed as an opera singer at the Royal Swedish Opera, and as an actor at the Royal Dramatic Theatre, in 1788–1799, and additionally as both an actor and a singer at the Stenborg Theatre in Stockholm in 1784–1799.

Her father worked as a caretaker. She debuted at the Eriksberg Theatre in Stockholm in January 1784. The same year, she became a student at the Royal Opera, but she was not contracted there until 1788. She was the student of Carl Stenborg.

The memoirist Gjörwell wrote about her: "She lived with her mother and lived a modest life. She was a fairly beautiful girl, sang beautifully but acted with coldness and spoke monotoniously."

At her performance in Norrköping 1800, she was given the critique: "Mrs Brooman have given the part to our complete pleasure. We can only regret, that an illness to the chest deny her voice the strength." She died soon after.

She married her colleague Johan Erik Brooman in 1798.
