= 1959 in Sweden =

- Decades: 1930s; 1940s; 1950s; 1960s; 1970s
- See also: Other events of 1959; Timeline of Swedish history

Events from the year 1959 in Sweden

== Incumbents ==
- Monarch – Gustaf VI Adolf
- Prime Minister – Tage Erlander

== Events ==
- The Lycksele Zoo established

== Popular culture ==
=== Film ===
- 26 January – Fröken Chic released
- 13 November – Raggare! released

== Births ==
- 8 January – Björn Jilsén, handball player.
- 9 January – Tommy Holmgren, football player
- 27 January – Göran Hägglund, politician
- 24 April –
  - Ronnie Båthman, tennis player
  - Johan Petri, theatre director, dramatist, and theatre scholar
- 22 May – Lotta Falkenbäck, figure skater.
- 23 May – Daniel Alfredson, film director
- 14 June – Håkan Södergren, ice hockey player
- 3 July – Jens Nordqvist, sprint canoer.
- 29 July – Jöran Hägglund, politician
- 16 August – Gunilla Röör, actress
- 23 August – Christina Herrström, screenwriter
- 30 October – Glenn Hysén, football player and manager
- 13 December – Staffan William-Olsson, jazz musician

== Deaths ==
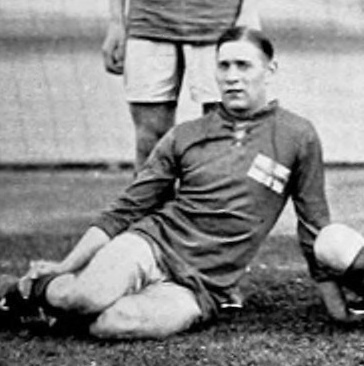
Karl Ansén

- 1 March – Ragnar Malm, cyclist (born 1893).
- 8 March – Olle Hjortzberg, painter and illustrator (born 1872)
- 20 March – Einar Svensson, ice hockey player (born 1894)
- 26 March – Frans Lindstrand, wrestler (born 1883).
- 11 May – Arvid Spångberg, diver (born 1890)
- 20 July – Karl Ansén, football player (born 1887).
- 19 November – Douglas Håge, actor (born 1898)
- 7 December – Nils Bolander, bishop (born 1902)
- 11 December – Gustaf Weidel, gymnast (born 1890).
