= 1962 in Sweden =

- Decades: 1940s; 1950s; 1960s; 1970s; 1980s
- See also: Other events of 1962; Timeline of Swedish history

Events from the year 1962 in Sweden

== Incumbents ==
- Decades: 1940s; 1950s; 1960s; 1970s; 1980s
- See also: Other events of 1962; Timeline of Swedish history

- Monarch – Gustaf VI Adolf
- Prime Minister – Tage Erlander

== Events ==
- Ewy Rosqvist and co-driver Ursula Wirth win the Gran Premio Argentina, finishing first out of 257 entrants and three hours ahead of their closest rival. Ewy Rosqvist goes on to join Mercedes-Benz.

=== January ===
- 1 January - Sweden's GNP increases by 4.5%.
- 1 January - Unemployment at just 1.2% of the insured workforce in 1961.
- 1 January - Fixed capital formation rises to 22% of GNP, with strong government-backed housing initiatives.
- 1 January - Wages increase by 8.5%, but inflation remains moderate at 2%.

=== March ===
- 31 March - 51st edition of the Davis Cup has Sweden defeating Italy in the Europe Zone final.

=== December ===
- 31 December - Owe Ohlsson ends the year as the top scorer of the Swedish Association Football team, closely followed by Leif Skiöld and Örjan Martinsson.

== Births ==
- 6 March – Bengt Baron, swimmer.
- 1 June – Mats Fransson, former handball player
- 2 June – Rolf-Göran Bengtsson, show jumper
- 10 June – Peter Nilsson, ice hockey player
- 12 June – Patrik Bergner, actor, film director and playwright
- 29 June – Blossom Tainton-Lindquist, singer
- 5 July – Maria Lantz, academic artist
- 8 July – Jan Erixon, former professional ice hockey player
- 9 July – Jörgen Häggqvist, judoka
- 28 July – Lars Håland, cross-country skier
- 21 September – Peter Åslin, ice hockey player (died 2012).
- 26 September – Jonas Bergqvist, ice hockey player.

== Deaths ==
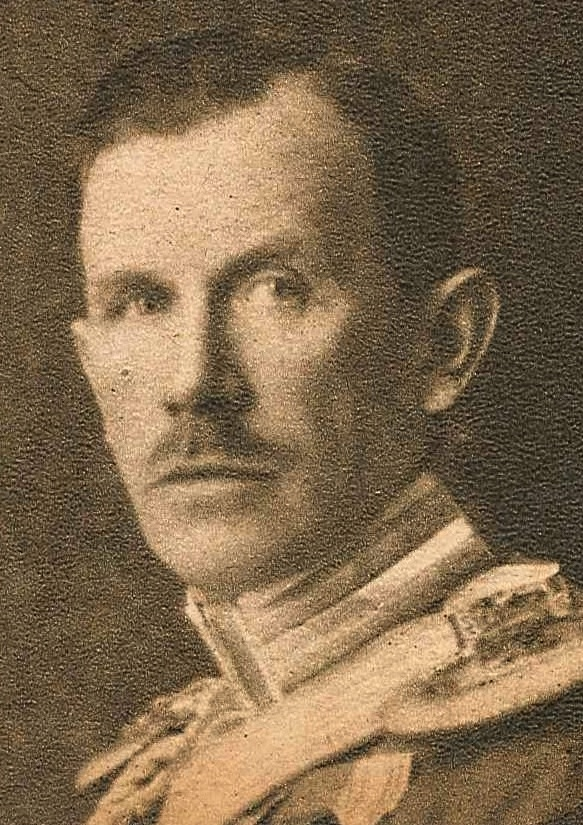
Count Gustaf Lewenhaupt.

- 5 January – Per Thorén, figure skater (born 1885)
- 22 January – Carl-Ehrenfried Carlberg, gymnast (born 1889).
- 18 February – Erik Granfelt, gymnast (born 1883).
- 5 April – Boo Kullberg, gymnast (born 1889).
- 11 April – Sven Landberg, gymnast (born 1888).
- 4 July – Carl Hellström, sailor (born 1864).
- 7 August – Gustaf Lewenhaupt, count, military officer and horse rider (born 1879).
- 19 August – Kerstin Hesselgren, politician (born 1872
