= 1871 in Sweden =

- Decades: 1850s; 1860s; 1870s; 1880s; 1890s
- See also: Other events of 1871; Timeline of Swedish history

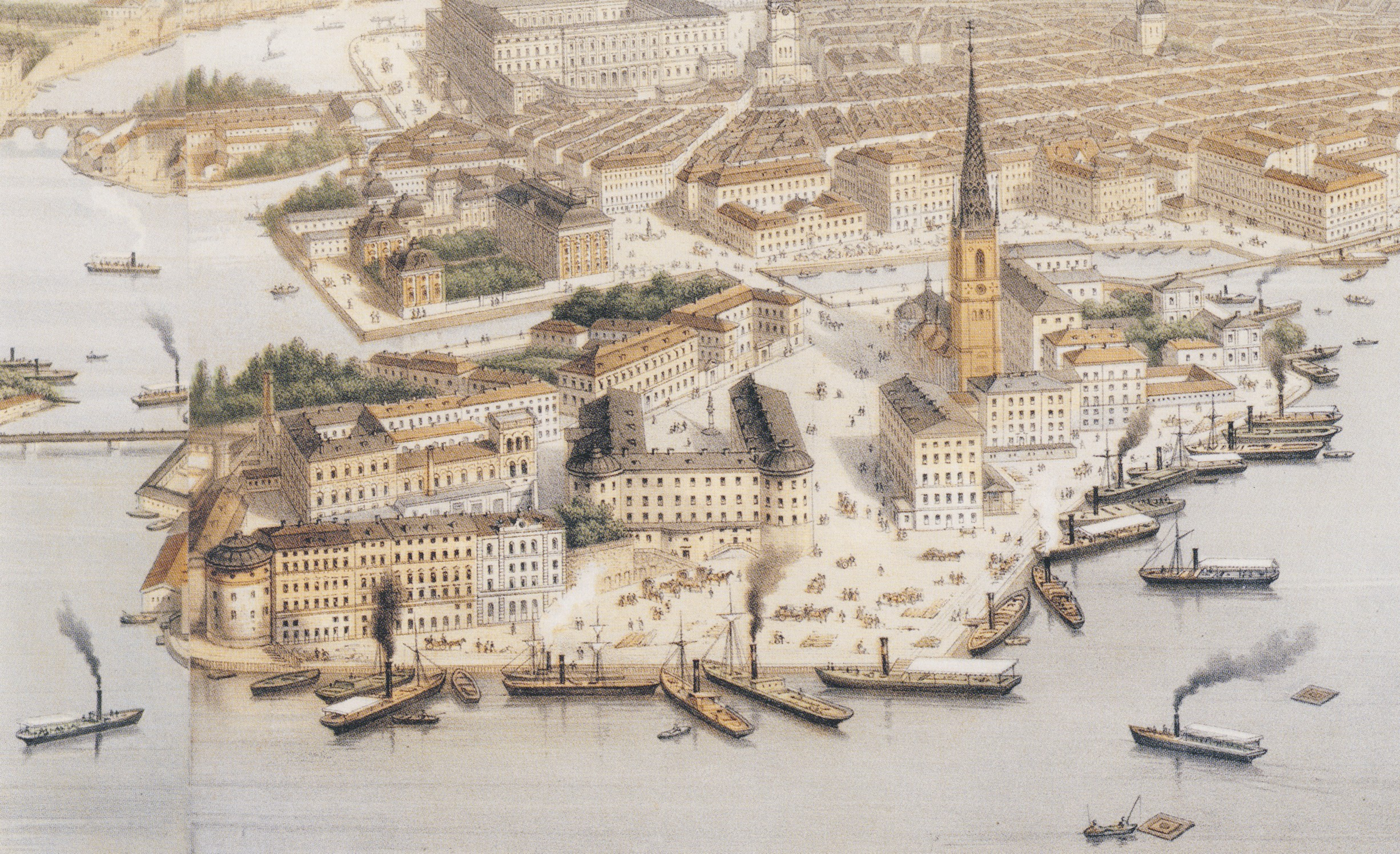
Riddarholmen, 1870

Events from the year 1871 in Sweden

== Incumbents ==
- Monarch – Charles XV

== Events ==
- Poor Care Regulation of 1871 replace the Poor Care Regulation of 1847.
- July – Handelsbanken is established in Stockholm.
- Stockholm Central Station is inaugurated.
- Geologiska föreningen is founded.

== Births ==
- 7 February – Wilhelm Stenhammar, composer (died 1927)
- 14 February - Gerda Lundequist, actress (died 1959)
- 15 February – John W. Nordstrom, Swedish-born American co-founder of the Nordstrom department store chain (d. 1963)
- 12 March – Oscar Hedström, co-founder of the Indian Motocycle Manufacturing Company, makers of the Indian Motocycle (died 1960)

== Deaths ==
- 25 February - Anna Sofia Sevelin, opera singer (born 1790)
- 30 March - Louise of the Netherlands, queen consort (born 1828)
- - Anna Sundström, chemist (born 1785)
- - Emma Fürstenhoff, florist (born 1802)
