= 1960 in Sweden =

- Decades: 1940s; 1950s; 1960s; 1970s; 1980s
- See also: Other events of 1960; Timeline of Swedish history

Events from the year 1960 in Sweden

== Incumbents ==
- Monarch – Gustaf VI Adolf
- Prime Minister – Tage Erlander

== Events ==
- 13 December – The motorway Vätterleden in Sweden is inaugurated.

== Births ==
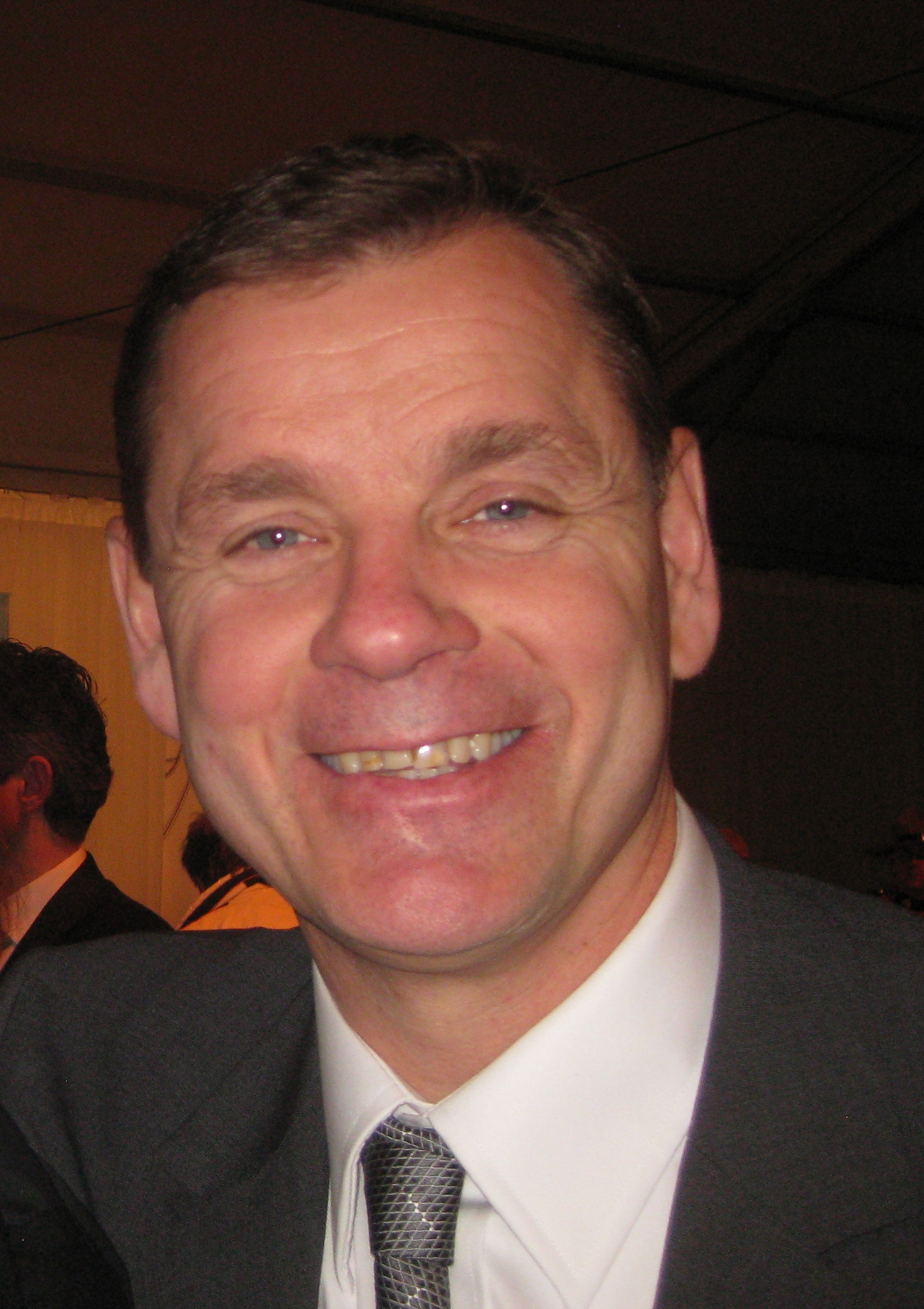
Håkan Loob.

- 27 February – Pär Arvidsson, swimmer.
- 12 April – Tomas Jonsson, ice hockey player.
- 3 July – Håkan Loob, ice hockey player.
- 26 August – Jan Brink, horse rider.
- 29 August – Helena Gellerman, politician.

== Deaths ==
- 4 February – Carl Björkman, sport shooter (born 1869).
- 8 May – Hugo Alfvén, Swedish violinist, conductor and composer (born 1872)
- 21 May – Rudolf Degermark, gymnast (born 1886).
- 29 June – Karl Lindahl, gymnast (born 1890).
- 9 September – Jussi Björling, Swedish operatic tenor (born 1911)

- Signe Bergman, feminist (born 1869).
- Ebba von Eckermann, feminist (born 1866).
