= 1966 in Sweden =

- Decades: 1940s; 1950s; 1960s; 1970s; 1980s
- See also: Other events of 1966; Timeline of Swedish history

Events from the year 1966 in Sweden.

== Incumbents ==
- Monarch – Gustaf VI Adolf
- Prime Minister – Tage Erlander

== Popular culture ==
=== Music ===
- Grimascher och telegram, album by Cornelis Vreeswijk

== Births ==
- 19 January – Yukiko Duke, journalist and translator
- 5 August – Håkan Algotsson, ice hockey goaltender.
- 8 September – Mats Arkhem, politician
- 12 October – Christian Due-Boje, ice hockey player.
- 12 November – Anette Norberg, curler

== Deaths ==
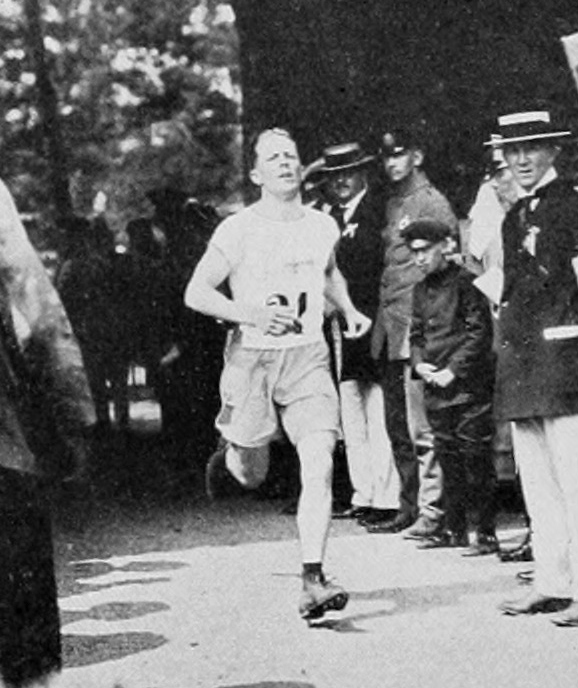
Gösta Åsbrink.

- 19 April – Gösta Åsbrink, gymnast and modern pentathlete (born 1881).
- 3 October – Rolf Maximilian Sievert, medical physicist (born 1896)
- 11 November – Carl Jonsson, tug-of-war competitor (born 1885).
