= 1965 in Sweden =

- Decades: 1940s; 1950s; 1960s; 1970s; 1980s
- See also: Other events of 1965; Timeline of Swedish history

Events in the year 1965 in Sweden.

== Incumbents ==
- Monarch – Gustaf VI Adolf
- Prime Minister – Tage Erlander

== Births ==
- 5 January - Patrik Sjöberg, high jumper
- 23 January - Hans Wallmark. politician
- 29 January - Peter Lundgren, tennis player and coach
- 27 February - Joakim Sundström, sound editor, sound designer and musician
- 7 March - Jesper Parnevik, golfer
- 4 August - Fredrik Reinfeldt, Swedish Prime Minister
- 3 October - Jan-Ove Waldner, table tennis player
- 9 December - Martin Ingvarsson.

== Deaths ==
- 7 March - Louise, Queen-consort of Sweden (born 1889).
- 26 July - Edvin Fältström (born 1890).
- 17 October - Anders Henrikson (born 1896).
