= 1792 in Sweden =

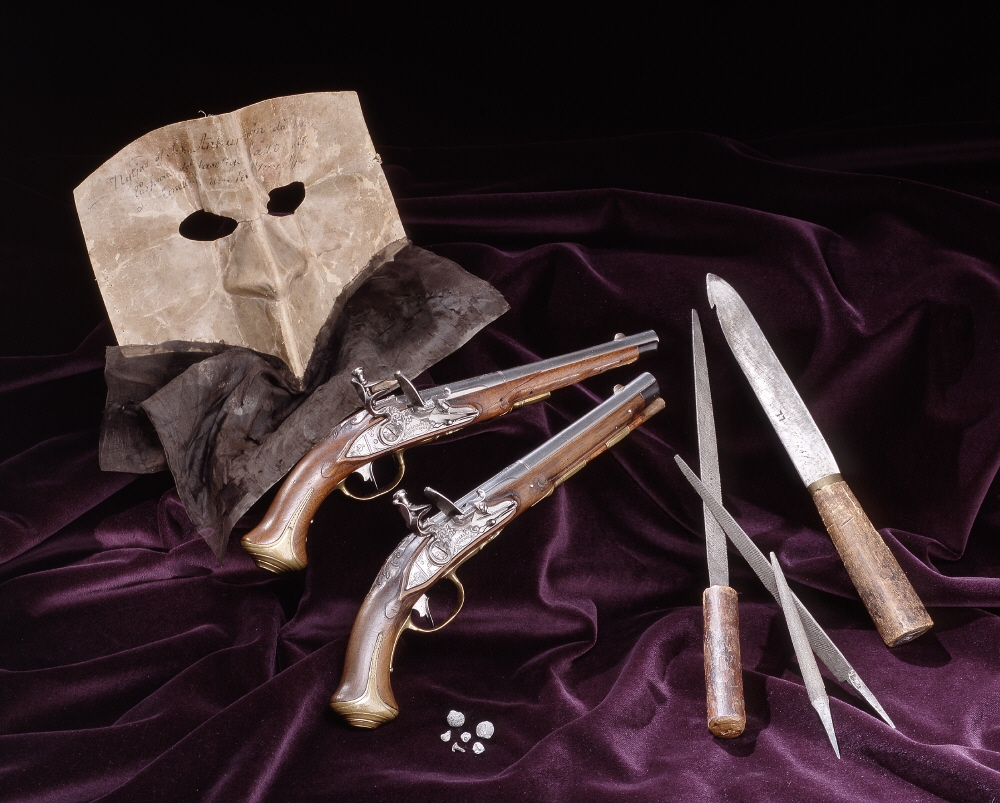
Anckaströms mask, knife and pistol

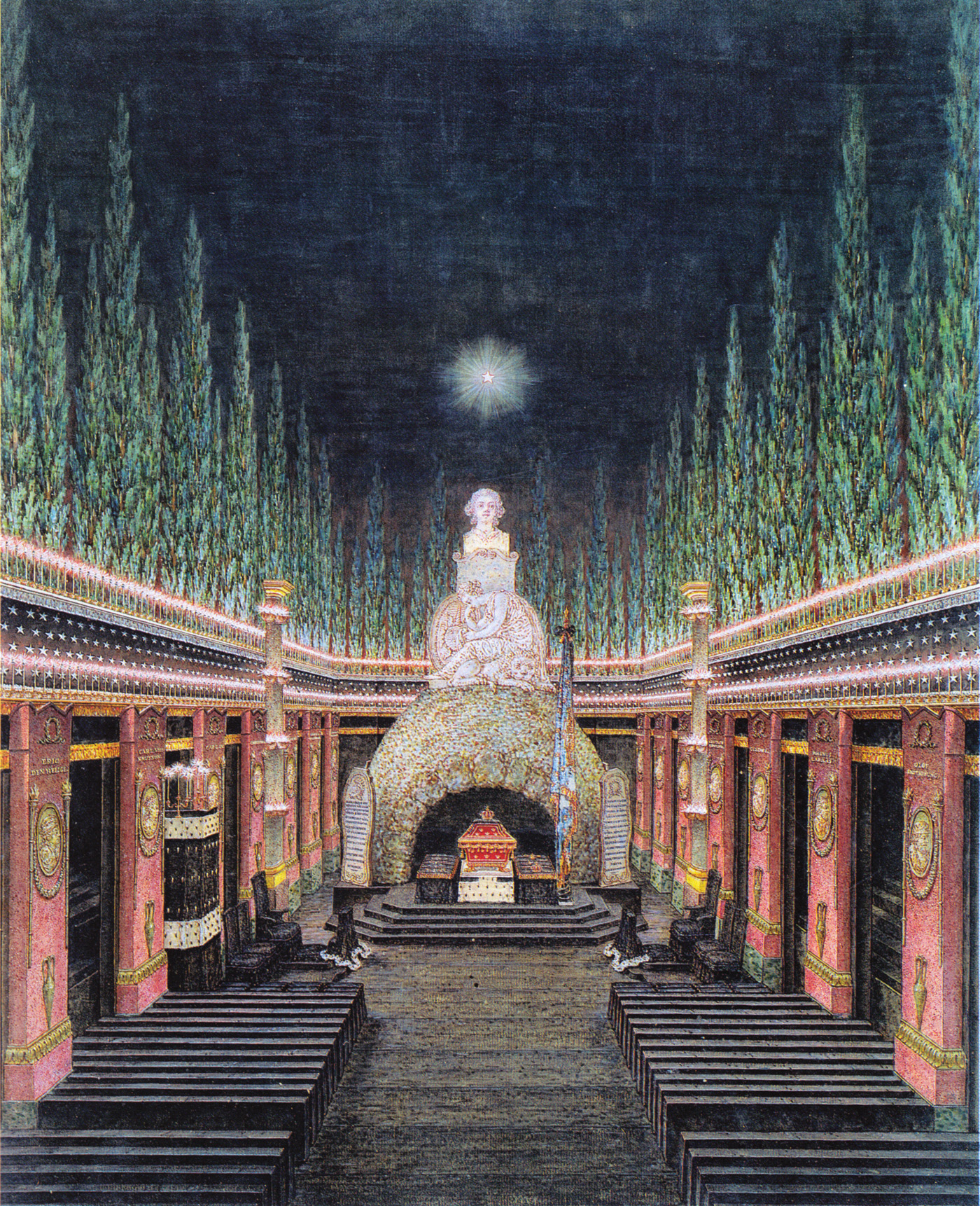
The decorations at the funeral

Events from the year 1792 in Sweden

== Incumbents ==
- Monarch – Gustav III then Gustav IV Adolf

== Events ==
- January - King Gustav III summon the Riksdag of the Estates to Gävle.
- February - The Riksdag of the Estates is dissolved.
- 16 March - Assassination of Gustav III: Gustav III of Sweden is assassinated by Jakob Johan Anckarström at a masked ball the Royal Swedish Opera in Stockholm.
- 29 March - Gustav III dies and is succeeded by his minor son, Gustav IV Adolf of Sweden, under the guardianship of his uncle, Duke Charles.
- The Funeral of Gustav III
- 27 April – Jakob Johan Anckarström is executed for regicide in Stockholm.
- July - Gustaf Adolf Reuterholm becomes a member of the guardian government and the de facto regent of Sweden.
- 20 December – The Marriage of Figaro is given for the first time in Sweden at the Stenborg Theatre in Stockholm with Didrik Gabriel Björn and Eleonora Säfström.
- The French Theater of Gustav III is dissolved.
- Om det allmänna förståndets frihet by Thomas Thorild.
- Thomas Thorild is exiled for revolutionary ideas.
- Foundation of the Nationalmuseum.
- Foundation of the school of Johanna Lohm.

== Births ==
- 12 January – Johan August Arfwedson, chemist
- 23 March – Carl Georg Brunius, art historian, archaeologist and architect (died 1869)
- 16 April – Ulla Stenberg, artist (died 1858)
- 24 July – Hedda Wrangel, composer (died 1833)
- 28 August – Karolina Bock, actress (died 1872)
- 18 September – Johan Fredrik Ernst von Vegesack, military officer
- Date unknown – Halta-Kajsa, tradition bearer (died 1857)

== Deaths ==
- 29 March – Gustav III of Sweden, monarch (born 1746)
- 27 April – Jacob Johan Anckarström, military officer and assassin of Gustav III
- 8 November – Hedvig Eleonora von Fersen, courtier (born 1753)
- 15 December – Joseph Martin Kraus, composer (born 1756)
