= 1961 in Sweden =

- Decades: 1940s; 1950s; 1960s; 1970s; 1980s
- See also: Other events of 1961; Timeline of Swedish history

Events from the year 1961 in Sweden

== Incumbents ==
- Monarch – Gustaf VI Adolf
- Prime Minister – Tage Erlander

== Events ==
- 4 March - A 17-year-old student opened fire at a school dance in Kungälv, Västra Götaland County, killing one person and wounding six others.
- 18 September – UN Secretary General Dag Hammarskjöld is killed in a plane crash in Ndola, Northern Rhodesia.

== Births ==
- 25 April – Agneta Andersson, canoer, three times Olympic champion.

== Deaths ==
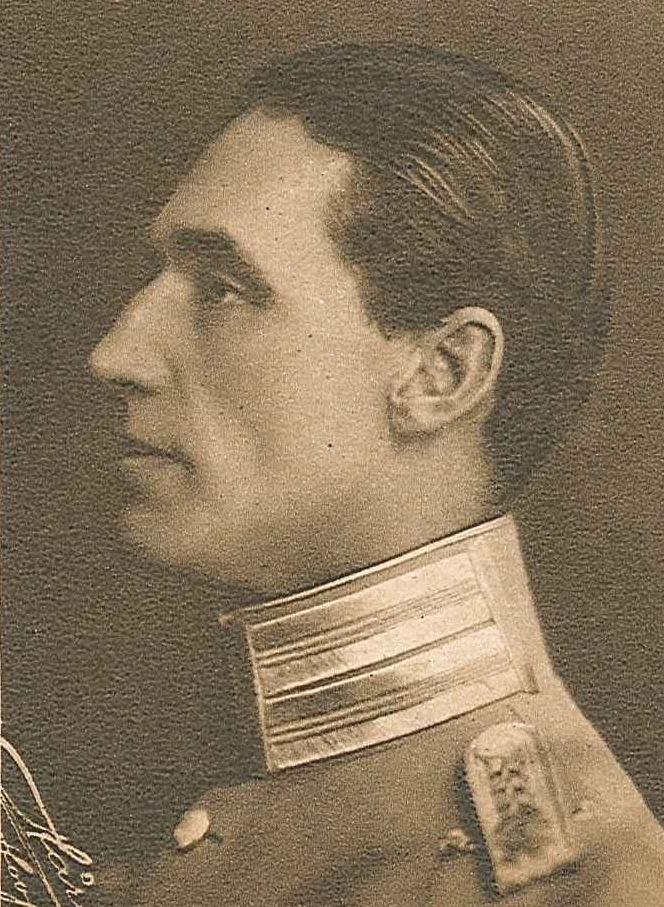
Claës König, Olympic champion in 1920.

- 7 January – Erik Lundqvist, javelin thrower (born 1908).
- 5 February – Humbert Lundén, sailor (born 1882).
- 18 September – Dag Hammarskjöld, UN Secretary General (born 1905).
- 24 November – Axel Wenner-Gren, businessman (born 1881)
- 25 November – Claës König, nobleman, military officer and horse rider (born 1885).
- – Ruth Gustafson
