= 1964 in Sweden =

- Decades: 1940s; 1950s; 1960s; 1970s; 1980s
- See also: Other events of 1964; Timeline of Swedish history

Events in the year 1964 in Sweden.

== Incumbents ==
- Monarch – Gustaf VI Adolf
- Prime Minister – Tage Erlander

== Events ==
- 1 January – the Name Act of 1963, comes into full and legal effect.

== Popular culture ==
=== Music ===
- Ballader och oförskämdheter, Cornelis Vreeswijk's debut album

== Births ==
- 24 January – Annika Dahlman, cross country skier
- 30 January – Marcel Jacob.
- 7 July – Dominik Henzel, Czech-born actor and comedian
- 26 July – Carl-Johan Vallgren.
- 5 September – Anna Fiske, illustrator and comics creator.

=== Full date missing ===
- Mats Gerdau.
- Torbjörn Flygt.

== Deaths ==
- 26 May – Sven Friberg.
- 5 August – Moa Martinson, author (born 1890).
- 19 December – Arne Lindblad.
