= 1885 in Sweden =

- Decades: 1860s; 1870s; 1880s; 1890s; 1900s
- See also: Other events of 1885; Timeline of Swedish history

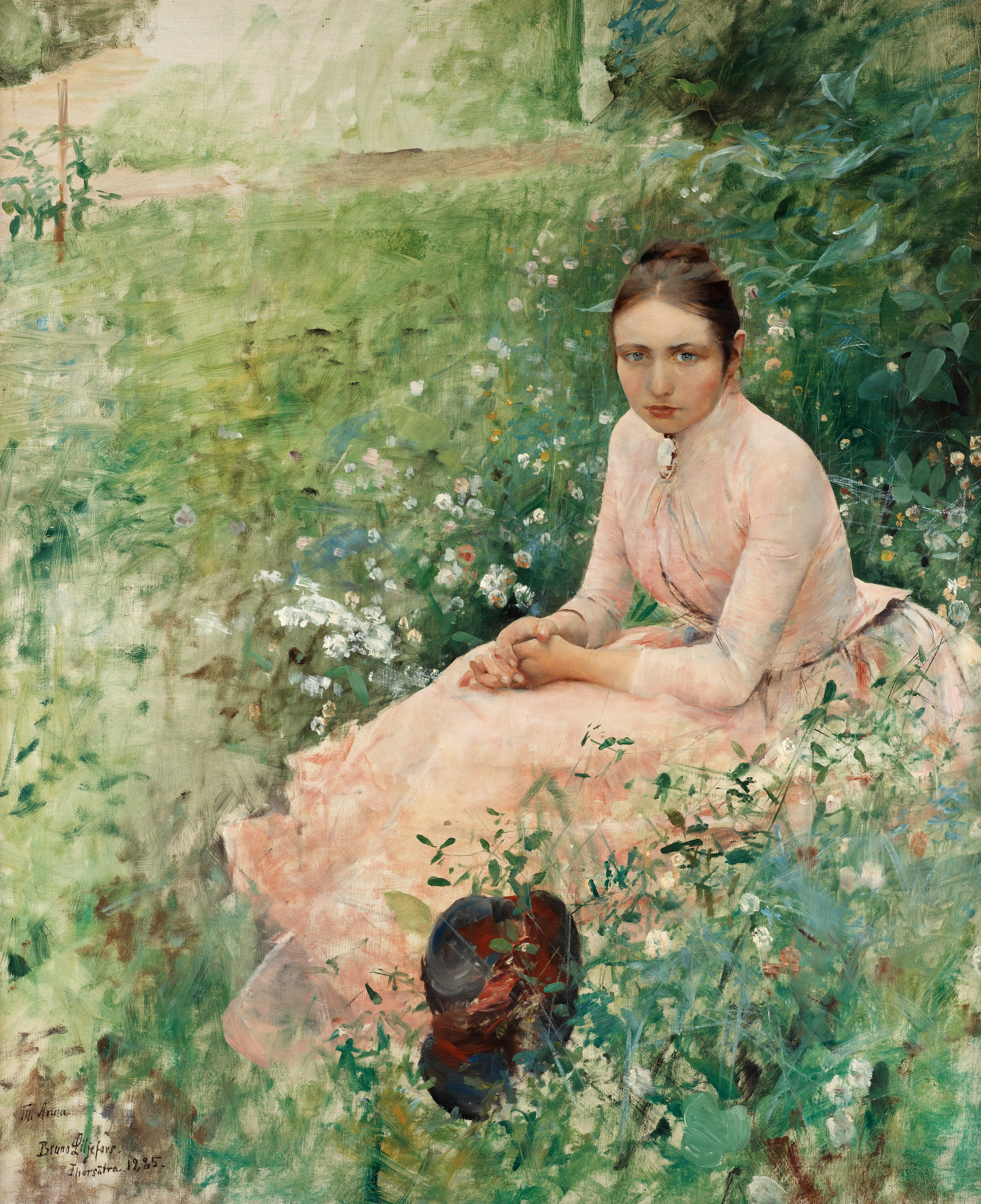
Bruno Liljefors-Anna

Events from the year 1885 in Sweden

== Incumbents ==
- Monarch – Oscar II
- Prime Minister – Robert Themptander

== Events ==
- 10 December 1885 – Härnösand becomes the first town in Sweden with electric street lighting, following the Gådeå power station being taken into use.
- Date unknown - The newspapers Borlänge Tidning and Social-Demokraten are founded.
- Date unknown - Creation of the Wahlström & Widstrand
- Date unknown - Women are allowed to become members of the Swedish Publicists' Association, and 14 women are inducted as members.
- Date unknown - Johanna Hedén founded Göteborgs Barnmorskesällskap (The Gothenburg Midwifery Association), the first union for women in Sweden.
- Date unknown - The governmental Girl School Committee of 1885 is established to reform female education: Sophie Adlersparre and Hilda Caselli are two of the members, making them the first female members of a government committee.

== Births ==
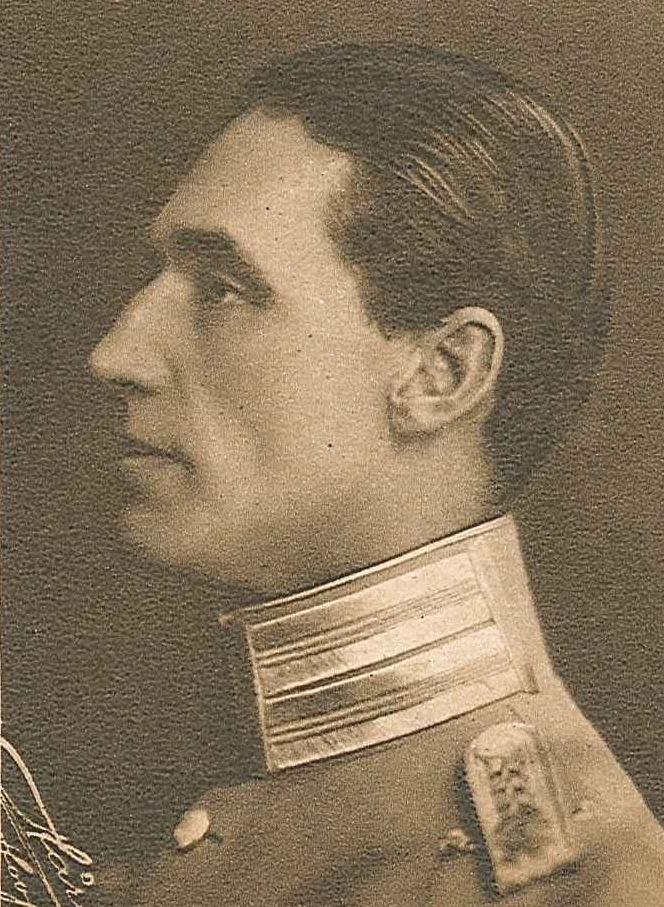
Claës König, Olympic champion in 1920.

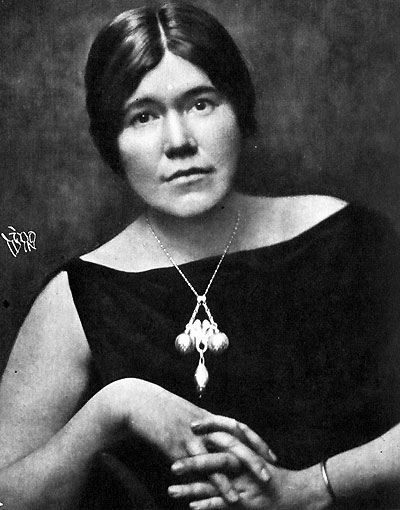
Ellen Rydelius

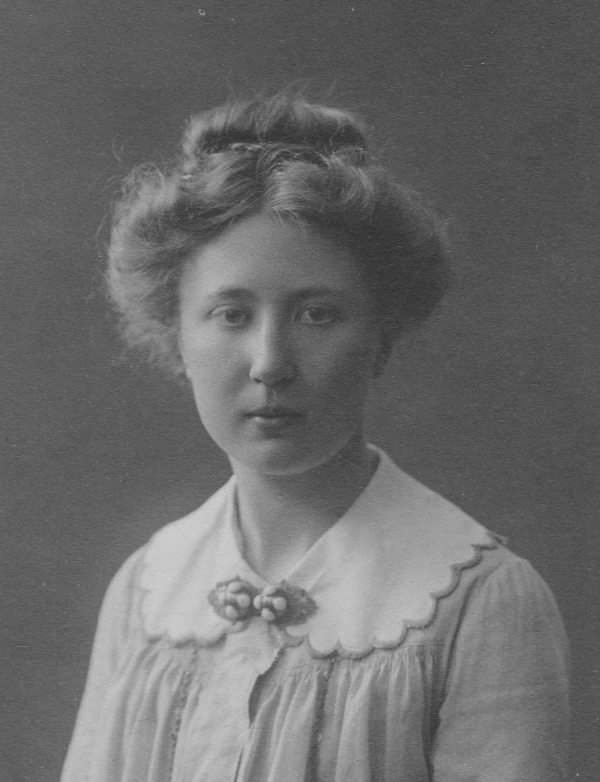
Karin Ek

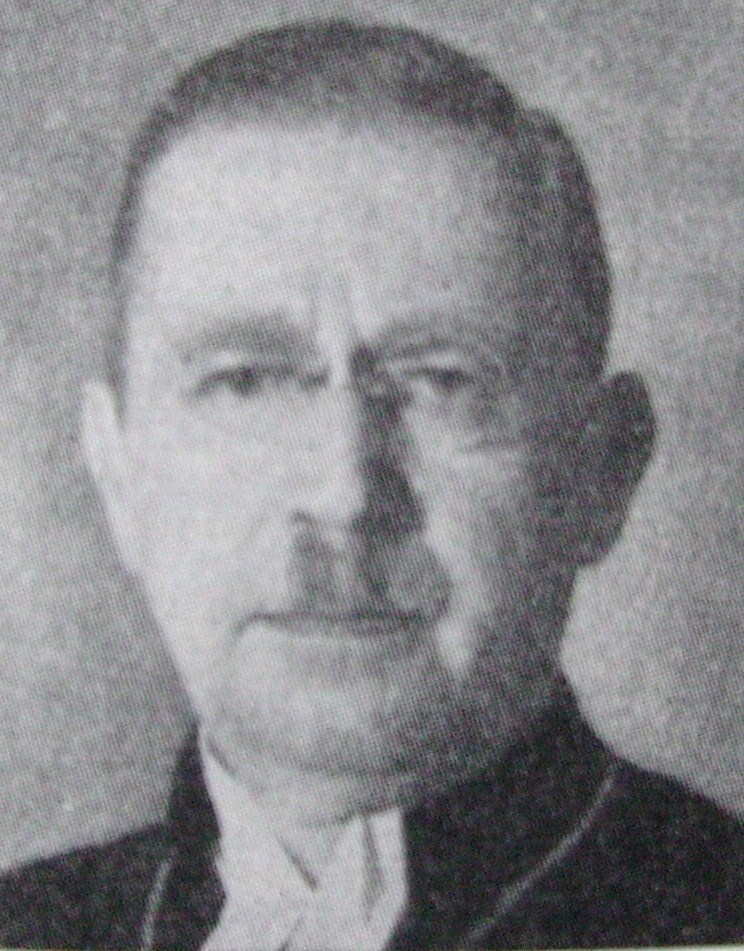
Tor Andræ

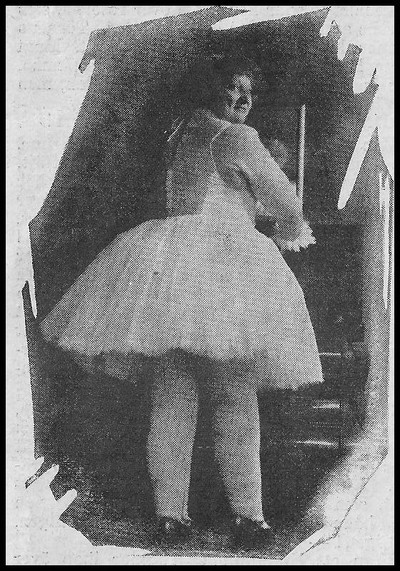
Lili Ziedner

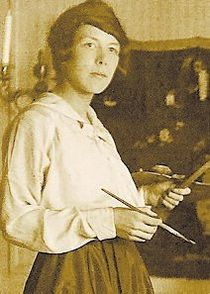
Sigrid Hjertén

- 13 January – Emil Johansson, tug of war competitor (died 1972).
- 14 January – Oskar Bengtsson, footballer (died 1972).
- 15 January – Claës König, nobleman, military officer and horse rider (died 1961).
- 24 January – Åke Grönhagen, modern pentathlete and épée fencer (died 1974).
- 25 January – Ivan Törnmarck, sport shooter (died 1963).
- 26 January – Per Thorén, figure skater (died 1962).
- 28 January – Julia Cæsar, actress (died 1971).
- 6 February – John Klintberg, athlete (died 1955).
- 10 February – Gösta Ehrensvärd, Navy officer (died 1973).
- 12 February – Bror Meyer, speed skater.
- 27 February – Ellen Rydelius, journalist, author and translator (died 1957).
- 1 March – Gustaf Månsson, sailor (died 1976).
- 20 March – Karl Sundholm, rower (died 1965).
- 3 April – Alrik Sandberg, wrestler (died 1975).
- 1 May – Knut Torell, gymnast (died 1966).
- 5 May – Albert Pettersson, weightlifter (died 1960).
- 7 May – Axel Johansson, rower (died 1973).
- 7 May – Gunnar Wingqvist, diver (died 1917).
- 13 May – Theodor Bergqvist, wrestler (died 1969).
- 19 May – Carl-Georg Andersson, wrestler (died 1961).
- 14 June – Arvid Åberg, hammer thrower (died 1950).
- 17 June – Karin Ek, writer (died 1926).
- 20 June – Brynolf Larsson, long-distance runner (died 1973).
- 21 June – Henning Möller, athlete (died 1968).
- 22 June – Karl Fryksdal, athlete (died 1945).
- 2 July – Anders Almqvist, rower (died 1915).
- 9 July – Tor Andræ, clergyman, professor, scholar of comparative religion and bishop (died 1947).
- 16 July – Carl Jonsson, police officer, tug of war competitor, swimmer and author (died 1966).
- 29 July – Sigurd Lewerentz, architect (died 1975).
- 30 July – Carl Wilhelm Rubenson, mountaineer (d. 1960).
- 8 August – Charles Luther, sprinter (died 1962).
- 24 August – Ivar Ryberg, rower (died 1929).
- 28 August – Eskil Brodd, diver (died 1969).
- 30 August – Nils von Kantzow, gymnast (died 1967).
- 14 September – Lili Ziedner, actress (died 1939).
- 30 September – Frans Fast, tug of war competitor (died 1959).
- 4 October – Nils Häggström, modern pentathlete (died 1974).
- 9 October – Thor Ericsson, footballer (died 1975).
- 7 October – Nils Hellsten, gymnast (died 1963).
- 18 October – Gustaf Broberg, rower (died 1952).
- 23 October – Elna Montgomery, figure skater (died 1981).
- 25 October – Malcolm Svensson, track and field athlete (died 1961).
- 27 October – Sigrid Hjertén, painter (died 1948).
- 28 October – Per Albin Hansson, politician, prime minister (died 1946).
- 29 October – Ivan Lamby, sailor (died 1970).
- 30 October – Leonard Peterson, gymnast (died 1956).
- 23 November – Hugo Björklund, wrestler (died 1963).
- 3 December – Gustaf Andersson, sport shooter (died 1969).
- 7 December – Theodor Nauman, water polo goalkeeper (died 1947).
- 8 December – Axel Lindahl, athlete (died 1959).
- 15 December – Jacob Westberg, long-distance runner (died 1933).
- 28 December – Carl-Gustaf Klerck, fencer (died 1976).
- 30 December – Artur Cederborgh, actor (died 1961).
- 30 December – Frank Martin, equestrian (died 1962).

== Deaths ==
- 1 January - Pilt Carin Ersdotter, famed beauty (born 1814)
- 27 January - Andreas Bruce, transsexual (born 1808)
- 11 January - Helga de la Brache, con artist (born 1817)
- 7 February - Betty Pettersson, first female university student (born 1838)
