= 1963 in Sweden =

- Decades: 1940s; 1950s; 1960s; 1970s; 1980s
- See also: Other events of 1963; Timeline of Swedish history

Events from the year 1963 in Sweden

== Incumbents ==
- Monarch – Gustaf VI Adolf
- Prime Minister – Tage Erlander

== Popular culture ==
=== Film ===
- 23 September – The Silence released
- Ingmar Bergman Makes a Movie, documentary film directed by Vilgot Sjöman

=== Sport ===
- 7 to 13 September – The World Weightlifting Championships were held in Stockholm

== Births ==
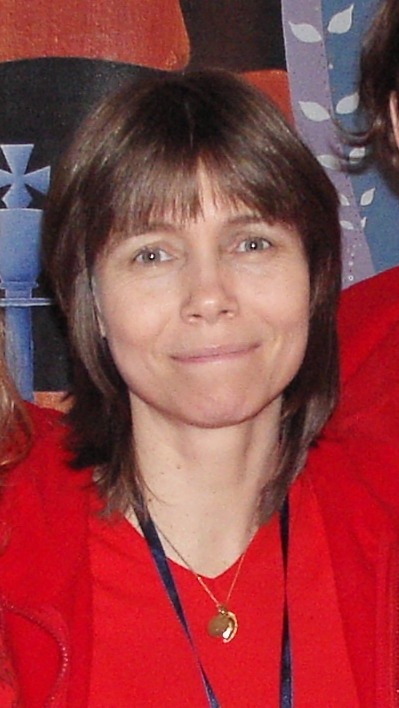
Pia Cramling

- 17 February – Carina Görlin, cross-country skier
- 12 March – Jerri Bergström, fencer.
- 1 April – Tobias Svantesson, tennis player
- 9 April – Magnus Tideman, tennis player
- 10 April – Jeppe Wikström, book publisher and photographer
- 16 April – Susanne Nordström, politician
- 11 May – Gunilla Carlsson, politician
- 29 June – Thomas W. Gabrielsson, actor
- 26 July – Torgny Mogren, cross-country skier
- 14 October – Maria Lundqvist, actress
- 23 April – Pia Cramling, chess grandmaster.
- 1 September – Idde Schultz, singer and guitarist
- 25 September – Mikael Persbrandt, actor
- 31 October – Mikkey Dee, musician
- 29 December – Ulf Kristersson, politician

== Deaths ==
- 7 January – Erik Lundqvist, athlete (born 1908).
- 14 March – Karl-Erik Grahn, football player (born 1914)
- 26 May – Otto von Rosen, military officer, sport shooter (born 1884).
- 14 June – Carl Skottsberg, botanist and Antarctic explorer (born 1880)
- 25 July – Gösta Stoltz, chess grandmaster (born 1904)
