= 1872 in Sweden =

- Decades: 1850s; 1860s; 1870s; 1880s; 1890s
- See also: Other events of 1872; Timeline of Swedish history

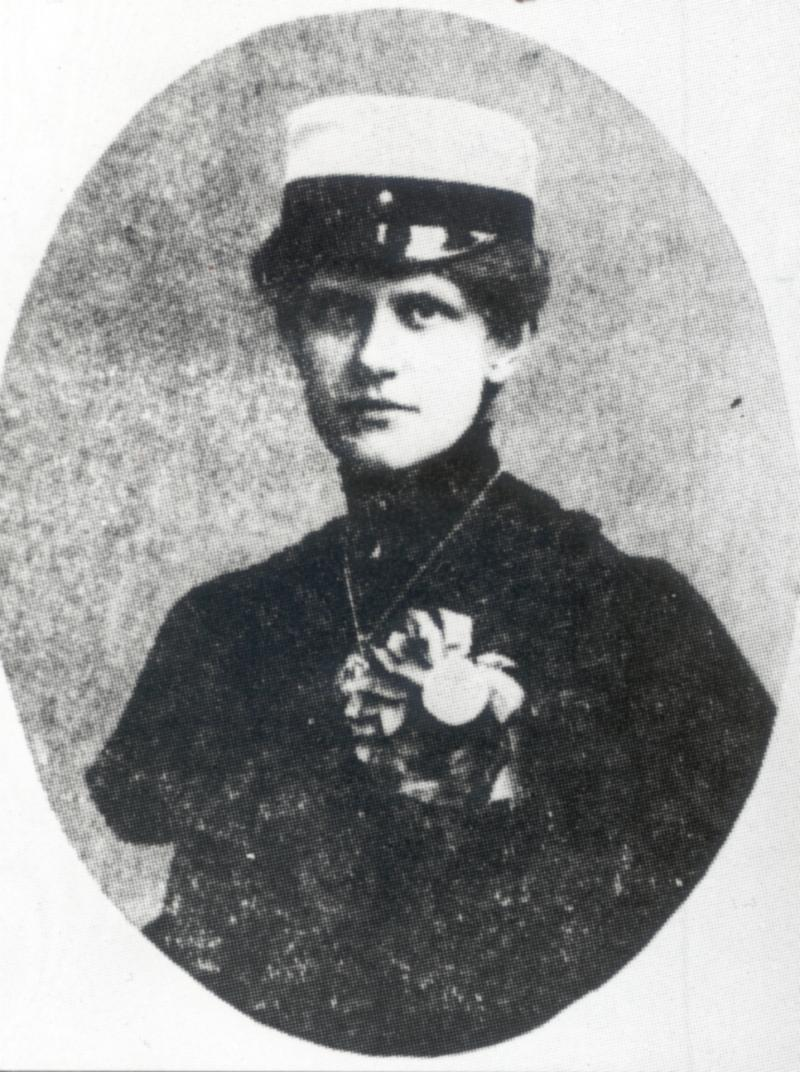
Betty Pettersson, the first woman to study in a Swedish university.

Events from the year 1872 in Sweden

== Incumbents ==
- Monarch – Charles XV, then Oscar II

== Events ==
- 27 February - Betty Pettersson is accepted as a student at the Uppsala university, and thereby becomes the first female university student in Sweden.
- - Women are granted unlimited right to choose marriage partner without the need of any permission from her family, and arranged marriages are thereby banned (women of the nobility, however, are not granted the same right until 1882).
- - Folk schools are given state support.
- - Linköping Central Station is completed
- 18 September - King Charles XV dies. Having no sons, he's succeeded by his brother Oscar II

== Births ==
- 14 January – Kerstin Hesselgren, Swedish politician (died 1962)
- 28 April – Carl Bonde, army officer and equerry (died 1957)
- 1 May – Hugo Alfvén, musician (died 1960)
- 9 June – Henry Rines, Swedish-born Minnesota Republican politician (died 1950)
- 26 September – Oscar Nygren, chief of the Swedish general staff from 1933 to 1937 (died 1960)
- 6 October – Carl Gustaf Ekman, member of parliament from 1911 to 1932 (died 1945)
- 12 November – Ida Granqvist, missionary (died 1949)
- 17 December – Valdemar Langlet, publisher (died 1960)

== Deaths ==
- 22 March - Karolina Bock, actress (born 1792)
- 3 April – Henriette Widerberg, opera primadonna (born 1796)
- 3 September – Immanuel Nobel, engineer, architect, inventor and industrialist (born 1801)
- 18 September – Charles XV
- 20 November – Lars Johan Hierta, publisher (born 1801)
- Helena Eldrup, educator (born 1800)
