= 1886 in Sweden =

- Decades: 1860s; 1870s; 1880s; 1890s; 1900s
- See also: Other events of 1886; Timeline of Swedish history

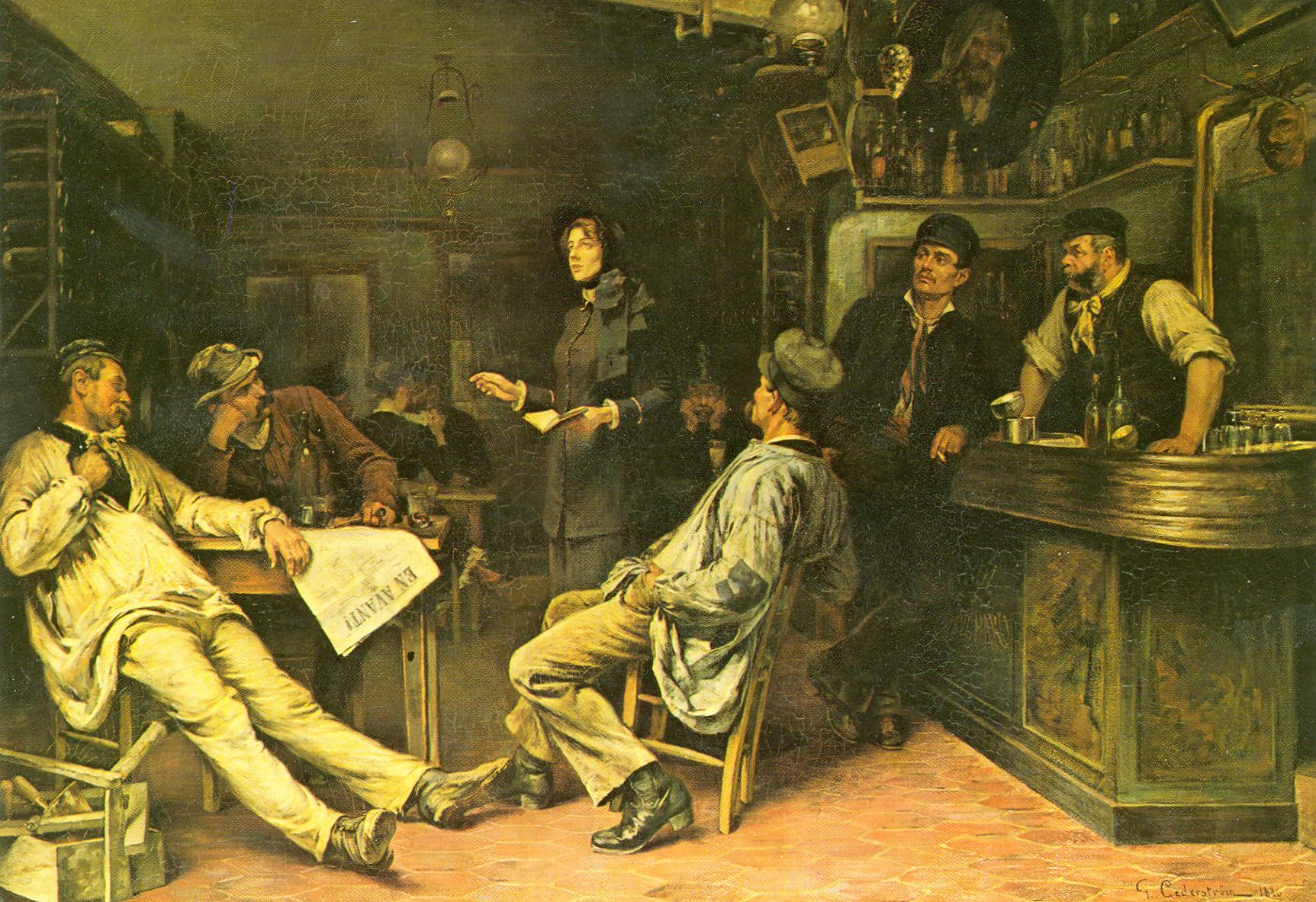
The Salvation Army by Gustaf Cederström 1886.

Events from the year 1886 in Sweden

== Incumbents ==
- Monarch – Oscar II
- Prime Minister – Robert Themptander

== Events ==
- The Dress reform society Svenska drägtreformföreningen is founded.
- - Brunkeberg Tunnel
- - Halmstad Bolmen Railway
- - Stella (magazine)
- - Storlien Station
- - Svenska Barnmorskeförbundet (The Swedish Midwifery Association) is founded by Johanna Hedén.

== Births ==
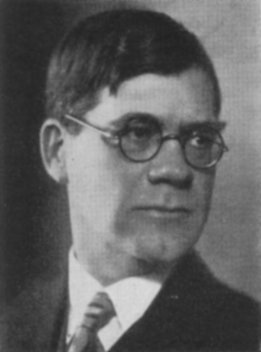
Östen Undén, Prime Minister 1945–61.

- 18 January – Clara Nordström, Swedish-born German writer and translator (died 1962)
- 6 March – Hugo Jahnke, gymnast (died 1939).
- 16 March – Herbert Lindström, tug-of-war competitor (died 1951).
- April 1 – Brita von Horn, dramatist, novelist and theatre director (died 1983)
- 9 June – Tora Dahl, writer (died 1982).
- 25 August – Östen Undén, politician, prime minister (died 1974).
- Eva Andén, lawyer, first woman in the Swedish Bar Association (died 1970).

== Deaths ==
- – Isak Albert Berg, singer, composer (born 1803)
