= Karin Ek =

Karin Ek may refer to:

- Karin Ek (writer)
- Karin Ek (artist)
