= 1887 in Sweden =

- Decades: 1860s; 1870s; 1880s; 1890s; 1900s
- See also: Other events of 1887; Timeline of Swedish history

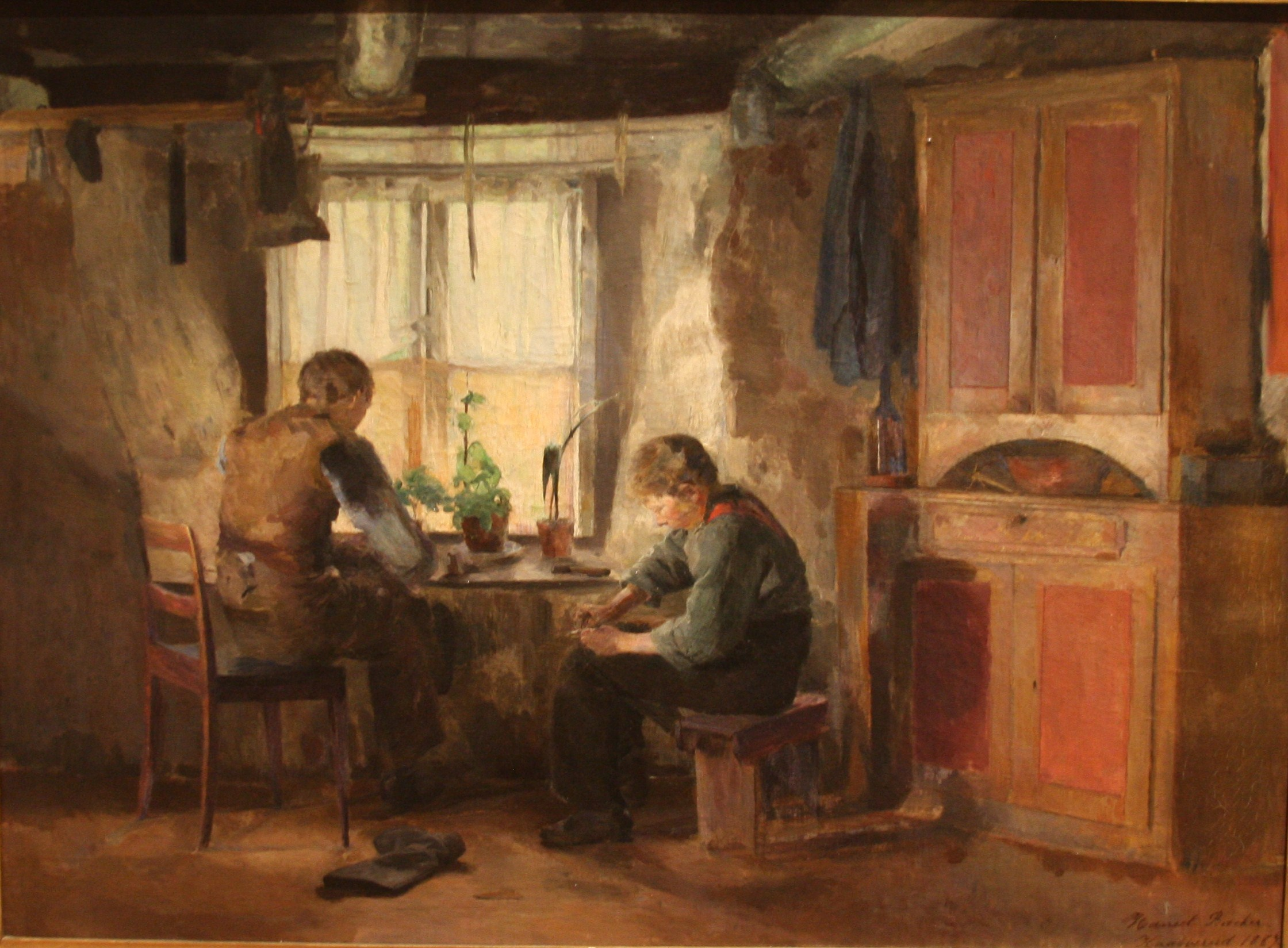
Backer Bygdeskomakere

Events from the year 1887 in Sweden

== Incumbents ==
- Monarch – Oscar II
- Prime Minister – Robert Themptander

== Events ==
- - Swedish State Railways established.
- - Swedish Painters' Union founded.
- - Arbetet
- - Old Stockholm telephone tower
- - Örgryte IS
- - First issue of the women's issue Idun (magazine).

== Births ==
- 17 February – Nils Granfelt, gymnast (died 1959).
- 16 June – Hugo Johansson, sport shooter (died 1977).
- 18 December – Algot Lönn, cyclist (died 1953).

== Deaths ==
- 7 February – Hanna Brooman, composer, translator and educator (born 1809)
- Hedvig Willman, actress (born 1841)
- Antoinette Nording, perfume entrepreneur (born 1814)
