= 1869 in Sweden =

- Decades: 1840s; 1850s; 1860s; 1870s; 1880s
- See also: Other events of 1869; Timeline of Swedish history

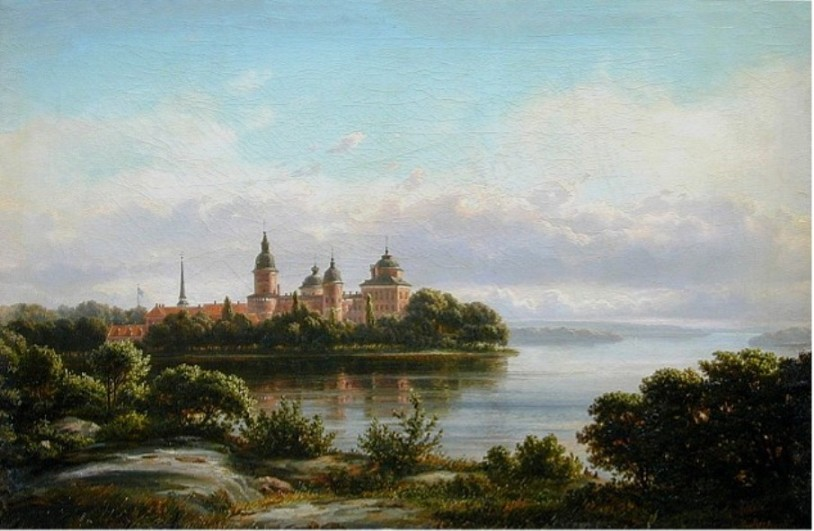
By Ferdinand Richardt, in 1869

Events from the year 1869 in Sweden

== Incumbents ==
- Monarch – Charles XV

== Events ==
- 10 July – Gävle is largely destroyed in a fire; 80% of its 10,000 residents are left homeless.
- Malmö SS is founded.
- Women are allowed to work in the railway office.

== Births ==
- 10 April – Signe Bergman, women's right activist (died 1960)
- 28 June – Lydia Wahlström, historian and women's rights activist (died 1954)
- 2 July – Hjalmar Söderberg, writer (died 1941)
- 21 October – Stina Berg, actress (died 1930)
- 6 December – Otto Nordenskjöld, geologist, geographer and polar explorer (died 1928)

== Deaths ==
- 28 January – Sophie Bolander, writer (born 1807)
- 22 September – Ulrika Sofia De Geer, countess and salonnière (born 1793)
- 12 November – Carl Georg Brunius, classical scholar, art historian, archaeologist and architect (born 1793)
