= 1888 in Sweden =

- Decades: 1860s; 1870s; 1880s; 1890s; 1900s
- See also: Other events of 1888; Timeline of Swedish history

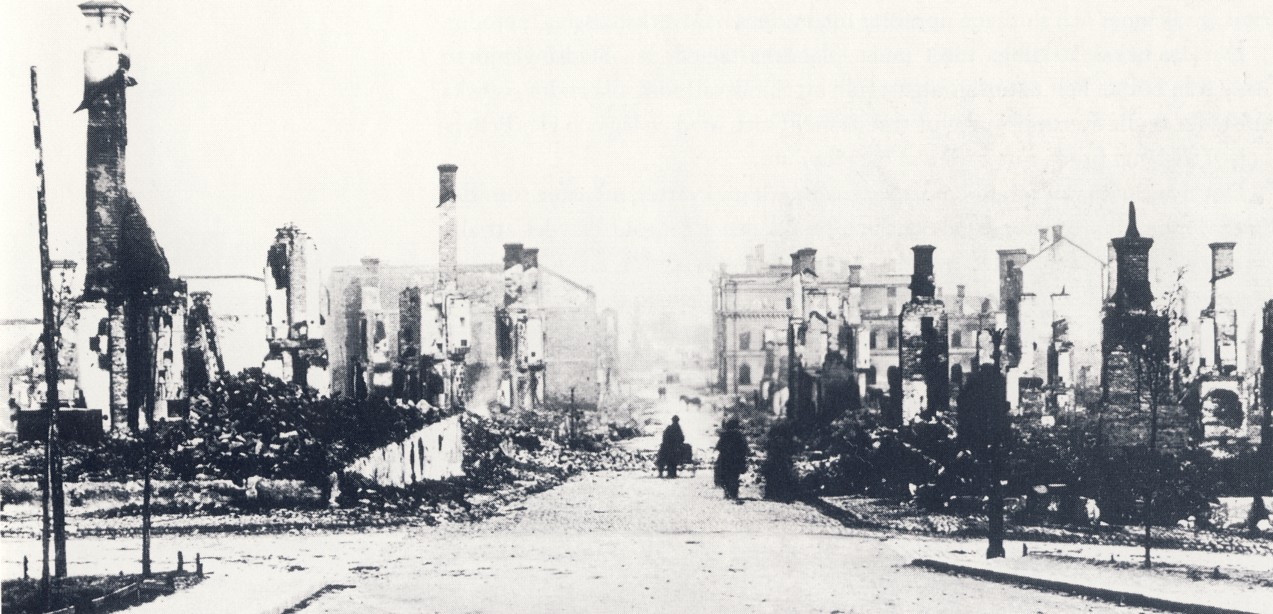
Sundsvall fire 1888

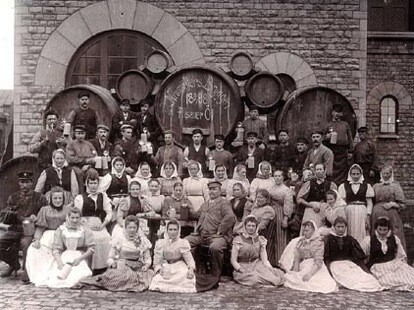

Events from the year 1888 in Sweden

== Incumbents ==
- Monarch – Oscar II
- Prime Minister – Robert Themptander, Gillis Bildt

== Events ==
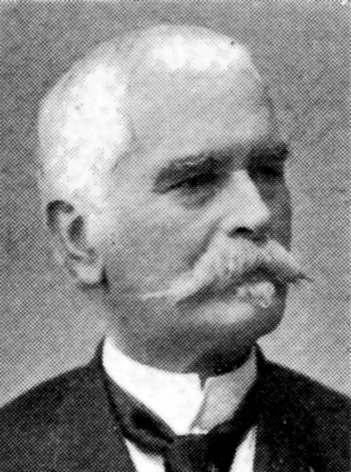
Gillis Bildt assumed the position of Prime Minister.

- 6 February – Gillis Bildt assumed the position of prime minister
- 25 June – The Umeå city fire destroyed most of the city of Umeå
- 30 September – Elizabeth Stride is murdered in Whitechapel in London.
- The Iron Ore Line is opened.
- The trade union Swedish Metalworkers' Union is formed.
- The mursmäckas launched a strike in Stockholm to raise their salary. This attracted a great deal of attention because of their gender, and the newspapers called it The Women's Strike.
- The Women's Worker's Club, the first political club for women in Sweden, is founded by Elma Danielsson in Malmö.
- The temperance activist Emilie Rathou became the first woman in Sweden to demand the right for women suffrage in a public speech.
- The Fotografiska Föreningen (Photographic Society) is founded: the first woman, Anna Hwass, is made a member of the board.
- The morganatic marriage between Prince Oscar and Ebba Munck cause a scandal.
- 1888 Sundsvall fire

== Births ==
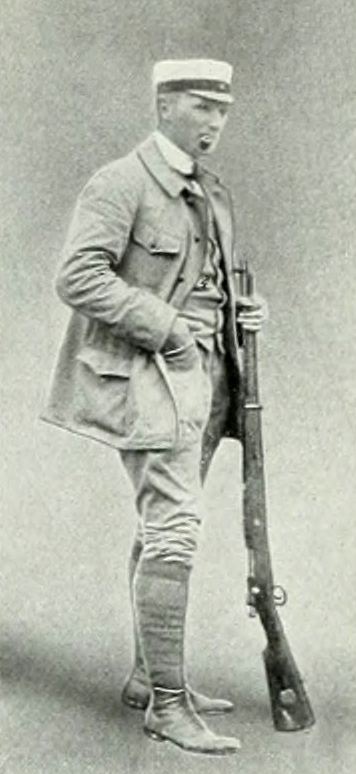
Åke Lundeberg won two gold and one silver medals at the 1912 Summer Olympics.

- 26 January - Lisa Steier, ballerina and ballet master (died 1928).
- 18 March – Axel Janse, gymnast (died 1973).
- 26 March – Elsa Brändström, nurse and philanthropist (died 1948)
- 14 December – Åke Lundeberg, sport shooter (died 1939).
- 18 December – Mauritz Eriksson, sport shooter (died 1947).

== Deaths ==
- 21 July – Victoria Benedictsson, writer (born 1850)
- 7 February – Aurore von Haxthausen, composer (born 1830)
