= 1884 in Sweden =

- Decades: 1860s; 1870s; 1880s; 1890s; 1900s
- See also: Other events of 1884; Timeline of Swedish history

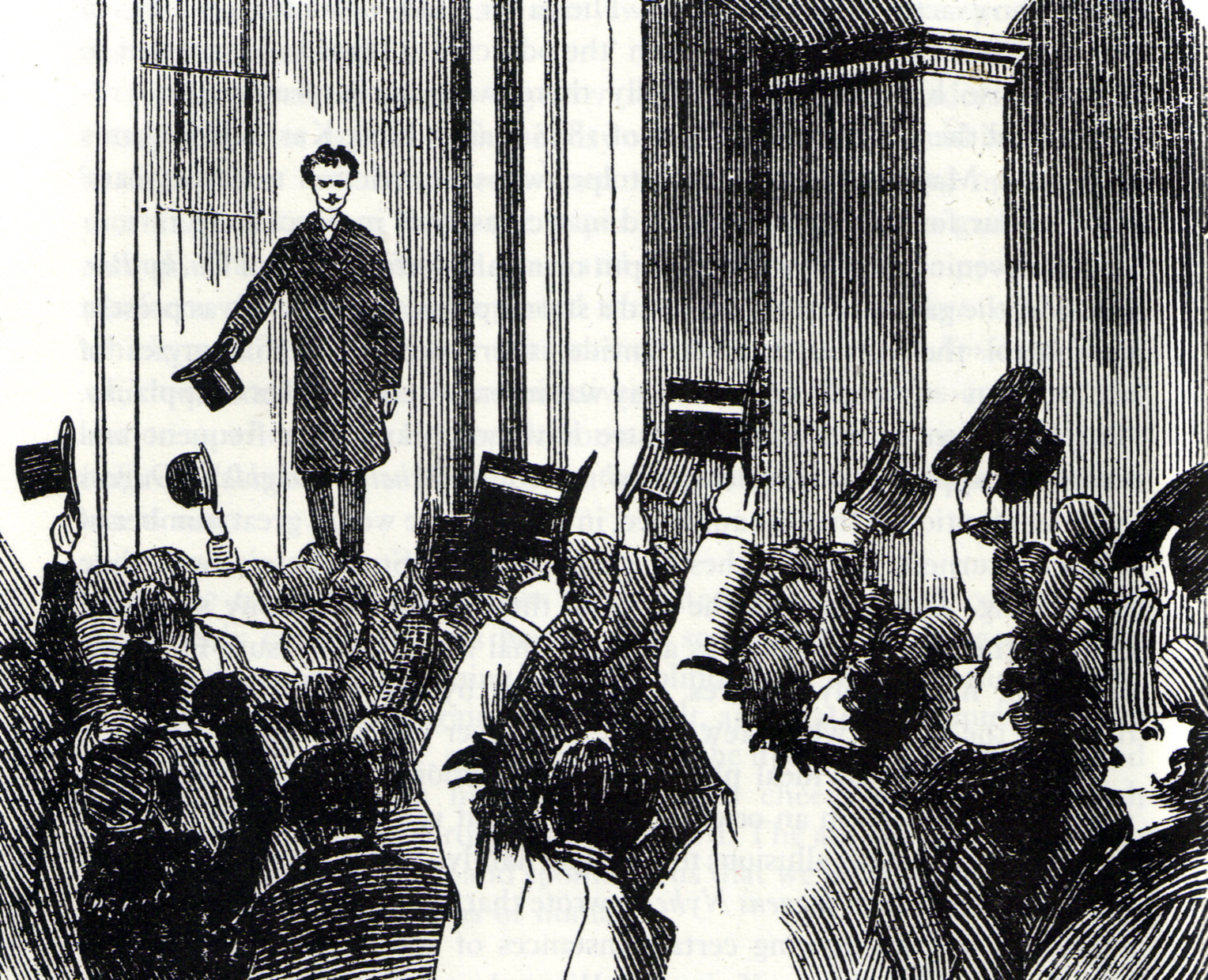
Newspaper illustration of Strindberg's reception on his return to Stockholm on 20 October 1884 to face charges of blasphemy arising from a story in the first volume of his collection Getting Married.

Events from the year 1884 in Sweden

== Incumbents ==
- Monarch – Oscar II
- Prime Minister – Carl Johan Thyselius, Robert Themptander

== Events ==
- - The court case of the short story collection Getting Married by August Strindberg, one of the most known incidents of the ongoing so called Sedlighetsdebatten.
- - The women's organization Fredrika-Bremer-Förbundet is founded in Stockholm. It is followed by the woman's organisation Göteborgs Kvinnoförening in Gothenburg.
- - May - Karolina Widerström becomes the first woman to graduate in medicine in Sweden.
- - First issue of ATL Lantbrukets Affärstidning
- - The toy company Brio is founded.
- - First issue of Svenska Dagbladet
- - The nursing college Sophiahemmet University College is founded in Stockholm by the queen.
- - The appointment of the Workers' Insurance Committee
  - Which led in turn to the 1889 Workers' Safety Act and the foundation of the Labor Inspectorate, as well as the 1891 National Health Insurance Act

== Births ==
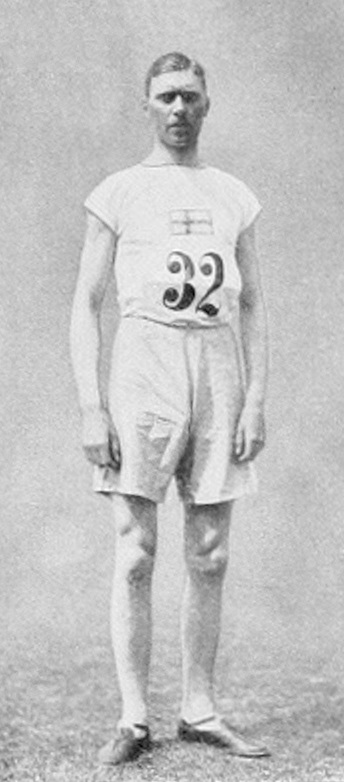
Gösta Lilliehöök, Olympic champion in 1912.

- 7 January – Carl Gustaf Lewenhaupt, equestrian (died 1935)
- 29 January – Rickard Sandler, 20th prime minister (died 1964)
- 9 March – Carl Holmberg, gymnast (died 1909).
- 11 March – Lewi Pethrus, minister and hymnwriter (died 1974)
- 31 March – Axel Ljung, gymnast (died 1938).
- 2 April – Gösta Adrian-Nilsson (died 1965)
- 11 May – Otto von Rosen, military officer, sport shooter (died 1963)
- 17 June – Prince Wilhelm, Duke of Södermanland (died 1965)
- 25 May – Gösta Lilliehöök, modern pentathlete (died 1974).
- 30 August – Theodor Svedberg, chemist (died 1971)
- 1 September – Sigurd Wallén, actor (died 1947)
- 4 July – Gustaf Malmström, wrestler (died 1970).
- 30 November – Ture Rangström, composer (died 1944)

== Deaths ==
- 2 October - Carolina Granberg, ballerina (born 1818)
- 22 November - Wilhelmina Gravallius, writer (born 1809)
- Lovisa Charlotta Borgman, violinist (born 1798)
- Therese Kamph, educational reformer (born 1836)
