= 1882 in Sweden =

- Decades: 1860s; 1870s; 1880s; 1890s; 1900s
- See also: Other events of 1882; Timeline of Swedish history

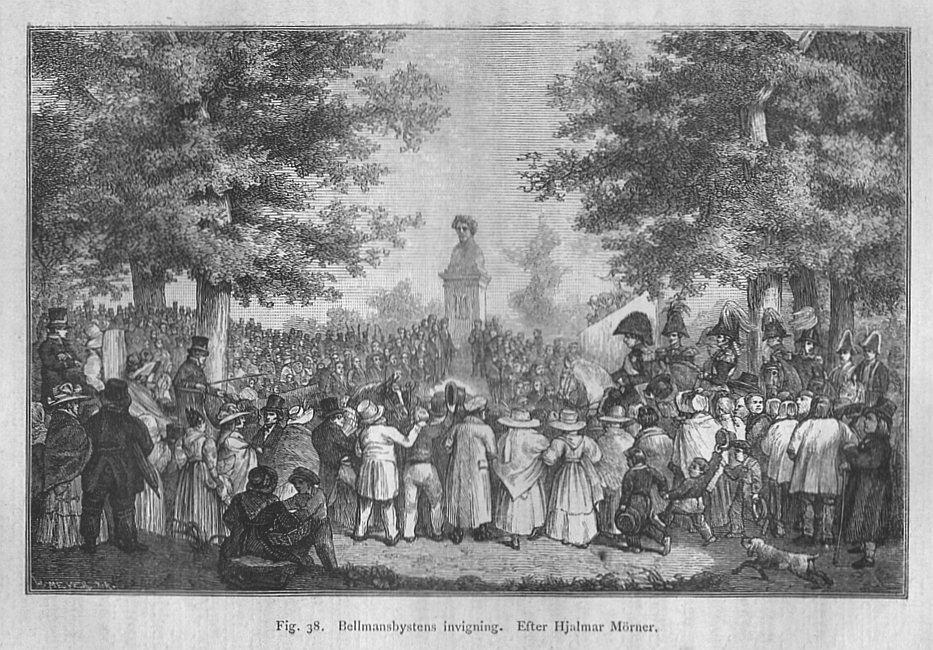

Events from the year 1882 in Sweden

== Incumbents ==
- Monarch – Oscar II
- Prime Minister – Arvid Posse

== Events ==
- Foundation of the Gefle IF.
- The Salvation Army is introduced in Sweden by Hanna Ouchterlony.
- Closure of the Rossander Course.

== Births ==
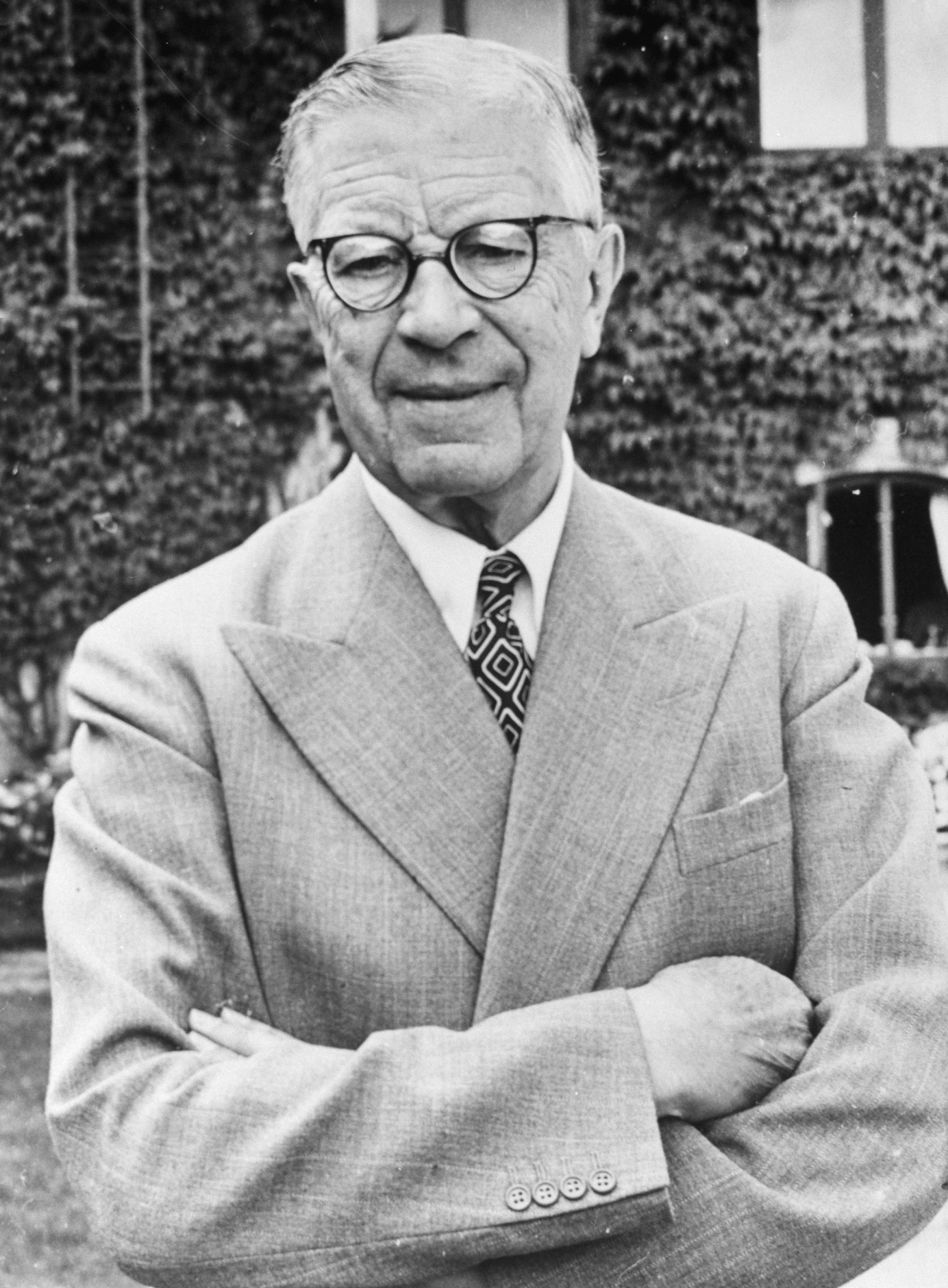
Gustaf VI Adolf was king of Sweden from 1950 until his death in 1973.

- 7 January – Humbert Lundén, sailor (died 1961).
- 16 May – Elin Wägner, writer, journalist, feminist, teacher, ecologist and pacifist: member of the Swedish Academy (died 1949).
- 25 May – Filip Ericsson, sailor (died 1951).
- 4 June – John Bauer, artist (died 20 November 1918).
- 9 July – Gustaf Kilman, horse rider (died 1946).
- 17 July – Oswald Holmberg, gymnast (died 1969).
- 14 August – Elin Brandell, journalist (died 1963).
- 2 September – Paul Isberg, sailor (died 1953).
- 12 September – Sven Forssman, gymnast (died 1919).
- 11 November – Gustaf VI Adolf, king (died 1973).

== Deaths ==
- 1 April - Betty Deland, actress (born 1831)
- 11 November – Charlotta Almlöf, actress (died 1813)
- - Malla Höök, actress and courtesan (born 1811)
- - Anna Elisabeth Hartwick, lace industrialist (born 1796)
