= Hedda Wrangel =

Swedish composer

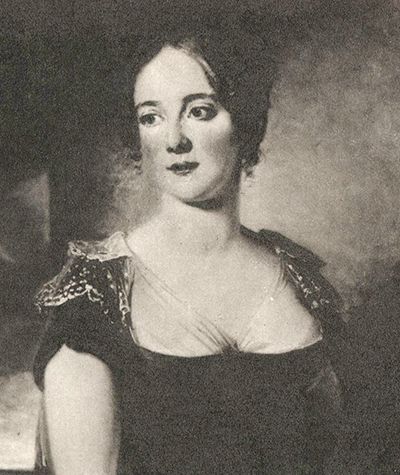
Hedda Wrangel. By Carl Fredric von Breda 1810.

Anna Hedvig "Hedda" Wrangel (née Lewenhaupt; 11 December 1792 – 24 July 1833) was a Swedish composer.

Hedda Wrangel was born at Forstena, the daughter of colonel count Gustaf Julius Lewenhaupt and Anna Helena Alströmer, and married in 1810 at Karlberg Palace to the courtier Baron Henning Wrangel af Adinal. Her husband was known for his hot temperament, love life and duels. The couple mainly lived at Sperlingsholm manor. She had no children, and died at Ovesholm.

Esaias Tegnér portrayed her in a poem (1827) in which he wrote: "When she sings, oh, breathing stops, and the tongue of gossip itself fall silent." After her death, Fredrika Bremer commented: "She flew through life as a dithyramb."

== Works ==
- Tegnér, Esaias; Wrangel, Anna Hedvig f. Lewenhaupt (1828). Tre sånger utur Frithiofs saga. Musik, tillegnad Frithiofs skald af Hedda Wrangel. ['Three Songs from the Saga of Frithiof. Music, dedicated to the Poet Frithiof by Hedda Wrangel'] Stockholm. SELIBR 2435497
1. . Frithiofs frieri, Andante
2. . Kung Ring, Moderato
3. . Frithiofs frestelse, Allegretto
- Ave verum pour chant et orgue, piano composition, autograph
