= 1889 in Sweden =

- Decades: 1860s; 1870s; 1880s; 1890s; 1900s
- See also: Other events of 1889; Timeline of Swedish history

Events from the year 1889 in Sweden

== Incumbents ==
- Monarch – Oscar II
- Prime Minister – Gillis Bildt, Gustaf Åkerhielm

== Events ==
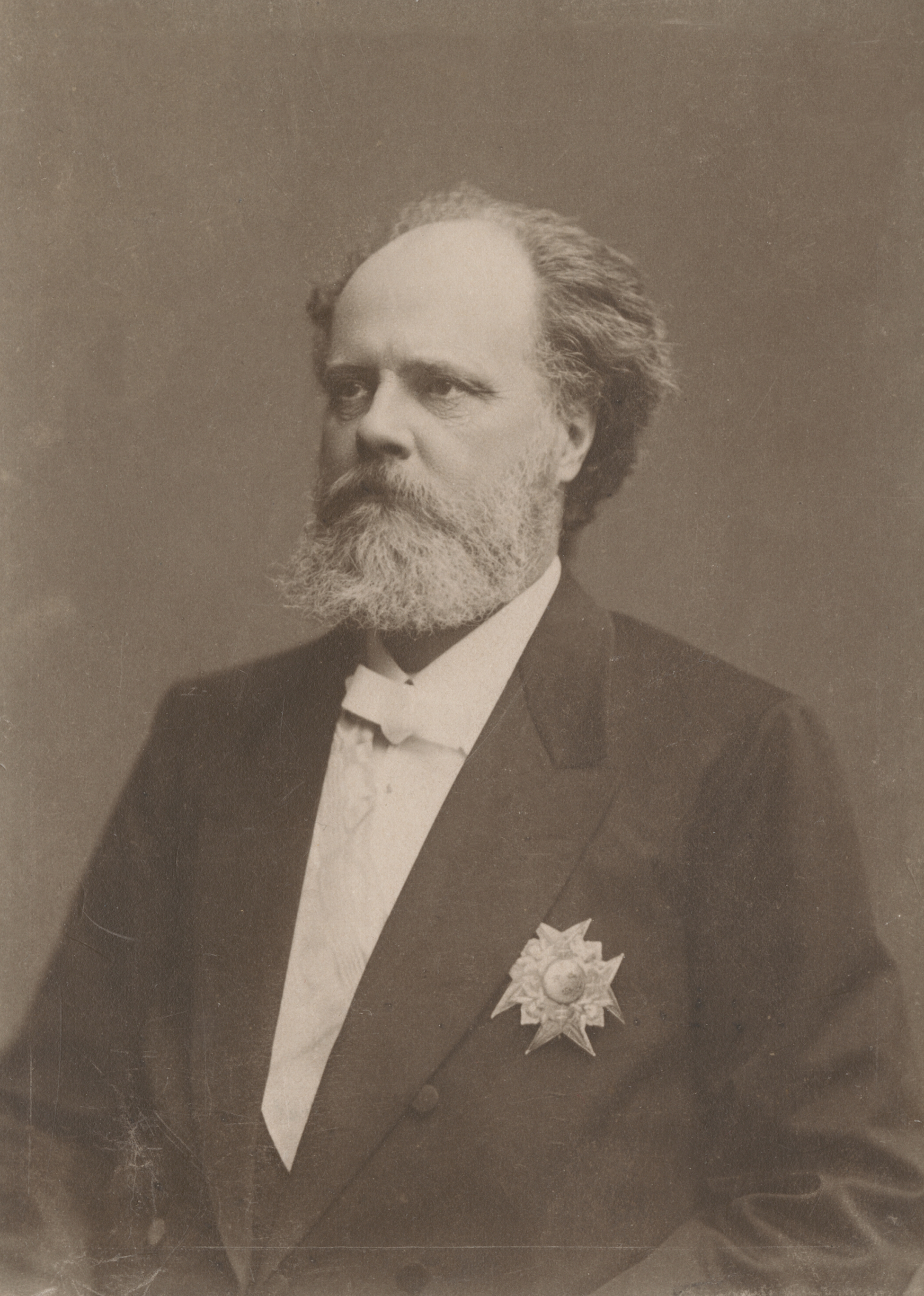
Gustaf Åkerhielm assumed the position of Prime Minister.

- 12 October Gustaf Åkerhielm assumed the position of prime minister
- - Sofia Kovalevskaya is appointed the first female university professor in Sweden.
- - The Yngsjö murder.
- - The Selander Company is founded.
- - Foundation of the Baptist Union of Sweden
- - First issue of the Stockholms-Tidningen
- - Foundation of the Royal Society of the Humanities.
- - The Swedish Social Democratic Party is founded.
- - Women eligible to boards of public authority such as public school boards, public hospital boards, inspectors, poor care boards and similar positions.
- - Foundation of the Sophiahemmet hospital in Stockholm.

== Births ==
- 23 May – Boo Kullberg, gymnast (died 1962).
- 18 October – Carl Bertilsson, gymnast (died 1968).
- 18 December - Alice Habsburg

== Deaths ==
- 14 July – Elma Ström, Swedish opera singer (born 1822)
- - Sophia Wilkens, pioneer in the education of students with Intellectual disability (born 1817)
- - Amalia Assur, first female dentist (born 1803)
