= Johan Petri =

Swedish theatre director (born 1959)

- Born: April 24, 1959 (age 67) Arboga, Sweden
- Occupations: Theatre director, dramatist, and theatre scholar
- Years active: 1991-present

Johan Petri (born 24 April 1959) is a Swedish theatre director, dramatist, and theatre scholar. His work takes place in a field formed by authors of late modernism, contemporary poetry, postdramatic theatre, improvised and contemporary classical music.

== Biography ==
Born in Arboga, Sweden, Johan Petri studied saxophone and composition at the Royal College of Music in Stockholm from 1980 to 1985. As a musician and composer, he was engaged at many Swedish-speaking theatres, including Stockholm, Gävle, Gothenburg, Helsinki, and also collaborated with different choreographers and dancers like Per Jonsson and Irene Hultman. In 2016, he received a Ph.D. in Directing and Dramaturgy from the University of Gothenburg.

== Theatre ==
In 1991, he presented his first production at Jordcirkus, Stockholm: On Goodness by Willy Kyrklund. Since then, he has worked on developing performances and new forms for musical theatre and many productions have followed at both well-renowned theatres in Sweden such as Unga Klara, Royal Dramatic Theatre, The House of Dance, and Swedish Radio Theatre, as well as at fringe theatre companies like Teater Pero (Stockholm) and Irondale Ensemble Project (New York City).

Petri is the co-founder of Alice Collective for Sound&Stage Art, a theatre company working with contemporary musical drama in different formats, which has produced performances directed by Petri, like plays by Öyvind Fahlström, musical theatre by John Cage, Mathias Spahlinger, and Erik Beckman. Co-founder and producer of record company Alice Musik Produktion since 1989, devoted to early Baroque music, improvised and contemporary music. In 2020, Petri was the co-founder of the radio theatre company Radioart, for which he has directed plays by Alice Notley and Gertrude Stein.

Since 2015, teacher and lecturer in directing, theatrical composition, and dramaturgy.

== Theatre (as director) ==
- 1991: On Goodness, by Willy Kyrklund, Jordcirkus, Stockholm.
- 1993: The Skirt, by Magnus Jacobsson, Jordcirkus, Stockholm.
- 1995: Ghost Sonata, by August Strindberg, Irondale Ensemble Project, New York City.
- 1999: The Free Thinker, by August Strindberg, Radioteatern (Swedish National Radio, Stockholm, World premiere)
- 2001: Mother, by Jörgen Gassilewski, Swedish National Radio, Stockholm.
- 2003: The Explorer, by Stig Dagerman, Swedish National Radio, Stockholm.
- 2006: The Blue Bull, by Birgitta Lillpers, Swedish National Radio, Stockholm.
- 2007: I am I because my dog knows me, by Gertrude Stein, Unga Klara, Stockholm City Theatre, Sweden.
- 2009: The Loaf or the Lamp, Johan Petri after Erik Beckman, Alice Collective for Sound&Stage Art, Teater Pero, Stockholm, Sweden.
- 2009: vorschläge, by Mathias Spahlinger, Alice Collective for Sound&Stage Art, Tensta Art Centre, Stockholm, Sweden
- 2009: Dido & Aeneas, by Henry Purcell, Oskars Parish House, Stockholm, Västerås Castle, Sweden.
- 2010: The hard and the soft, by Öyvind Fahlström, Alice Collective for Sound&Stage Art, Unga Klara, Dansens Hus, Stockholm, Sweden
- 2011: John and the Mushrooms, Johan Petri after John Cage, Royal Dramatic Theatre, Stockholm, Sweden.
- 2012: Ryoanji – A Meeting, Johan Petri after John Cage, Dansens Hus, Stockholm, Sweden
- 2014: The Baron in the Trees, opera by I Calvino/I Nilsson/ M Jacobsson, Alice Collective for Sound&Stage Art, Medelhavsmuseet, Stockholm, Sweden.
- 2014: The Blurred, by Johan Petri, Fabriken, Alice Collective for Sound&Stage Art, Stockholm, Sweden.
- 2015: The Price of Everything, by Sonja Åkesson, Stockholm City Theatre, Alice Collective for Sound&Stage Art, Stockholm, Sweden
- 2020: I Think Fiercely, by Alice Notley, Radiotart, Stockholm, Sweden.
- 2021: Doctor Faustus Lights the Lights, by Gertrude Stein/The Rosehips, Radioart, Stockholm, Sweden.
- 2022: To celebrate one’s own inner contradictions and inconsistencies, by Johan Petri after Brian Ferneyhough, Alice Collective for Sound&Stage Art, Stockholm, Sweden.

== Theatre (as composer) ==
- 1991: The Piggle, by D W Winnicott/N Gredeby/S Osten, Unga Klara, Stockholm City Theatre, Sweden
- 1992: Oedipus, Euripides, Unga Klara, Stockholm City Theatre, Sweden
- 1993: Faust, J W Goethe, Swedish Public Radio.
- 1995: A Family Affair, Alexander Ostrowsky, Irondale Ensemble Project, New York City, New York, USA.
- 1997: The Donated Heart, by Eva Ström, Swedish Public Radio
- 1998: The Magic Flute, after W A Mozart, Finnish National Opera, Helsinki, Finland.
- 1999: Complicated People, Nils Gredeby/Susanne Osten, Stockholm City Theatre, Sweden.
- 2000: The Investigation, Oratorio in 11 cantos, by Peter Weiss, The Swedish National Touring Theatre.
- 2000: The Border, Susanne Osten, Stockholm City Theatre, Sweden.
- 2001: Dark Times, by Henning Mankell, Unga Klara, Stockholm City Theatre, Sweden.
- 2002: The Most Important, by Nikolaj Jevreinov, Unga Klara, Stockholm City Theatre, Sweden.
- 2004: Cabaret Subsumption, Unga Klara, Stockholm City Theatre, Sweden.
- 2006: Baby Drama, Ann-Ssofie Báaráany/Susanne Osten, Unga Klara, Stockholm City Theater, Sweden

== Musical works ==
- Speak! It’s so dark, film score, nominated for best film music, Nordic Film Festival Haugesund, Norway, 1993.
- I fear this war, CD production, ALCD012, 1994.
- Bengbulan, Film score, Gothenburg Film Festival, 1996.
- The Investigation, chamber music, The Swedish National Touring Theatre, 2000.
- The Explorer, chamber music, Swedish Public Radio, 2003.
- Acre, Film score, with Marjetica Potcr, Art Biannual São Paulo, Max Proctor Gallery, NYC, USA, 2007.

== Publications ==
- The Rhythm of Thinking: Immanence and Ethics in Theater Performance, ArtMonitor, 2016.
- Creating Performative Critique - A reflective attempt of a dramaturgical and methodological kind on One Less Manifesto, by Gilles Deleuze. Orpheus Institute, 2015.
- Thinking and the theatrical event, The Event in Political and Artistic Practice, Amsterdam, Holland, 2013.
- Staging Gertrude Stein, Conf. Performance Studies/Artistic Research, Copenhagen, 2012.
- John Cage and the Production of Meaning, Conf. Artistic Research, Brno, Czech Republic, 2011.
- The Theatrical Expression of the Text; Staging Gertrude Stein. Kritiker 13, Sweden, 2009.
