= Lycksele Zoo =

Zoo in Sweden

Coordinates: 64.582°N 18.664°E

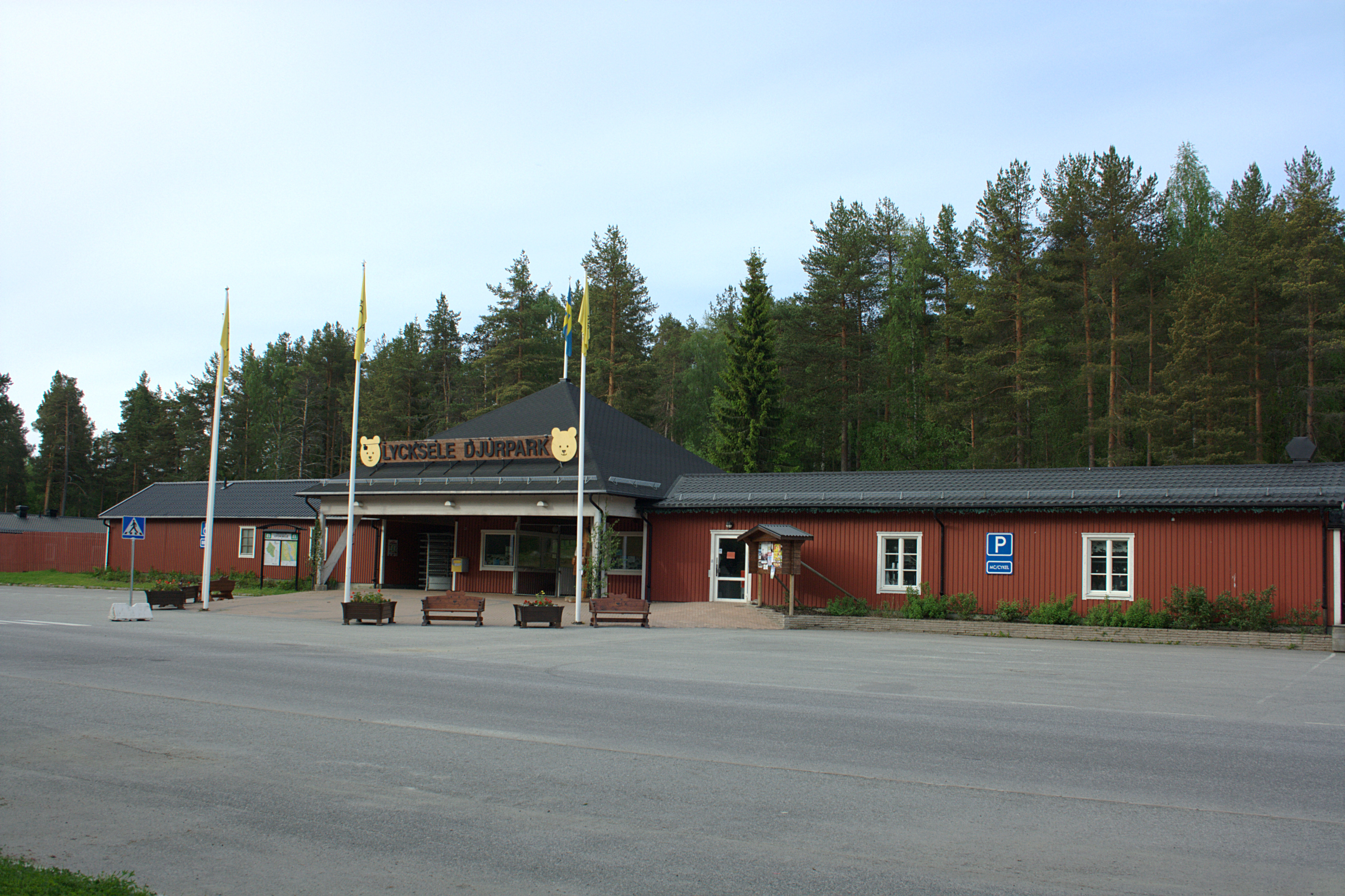
- Main entrance.
- Interactive map of Lycksele Zoo
- Date opened: 1959
- No. of species: 26
- Owner: Lycksele Municipality
- Website: http://www.lyckseledjurpark.com

Lycksele Zoo is a zoological garden located in the town of Lycksele in Northern Sweden.

The zoo was founded by Holger Lithner in 1959 and displays 25 species of Scandinavian animals.

In November 2014, the zoo was criticized because a lynx managed to escape from the zoo. It also drew attention in December 2014 after a tourist train driver was discovered to be under the influence of alcohol while driving passengers. In January 2015, a two-year-old dog, a Siberian husky, was attacked by a lynx in Lycksele. As the attack on the dog took place during a walk with the owner in the residential area of Lycksele, this is believed to be the same lynx that escaped from the zoo in November 2014.
