= Maria Lantz =

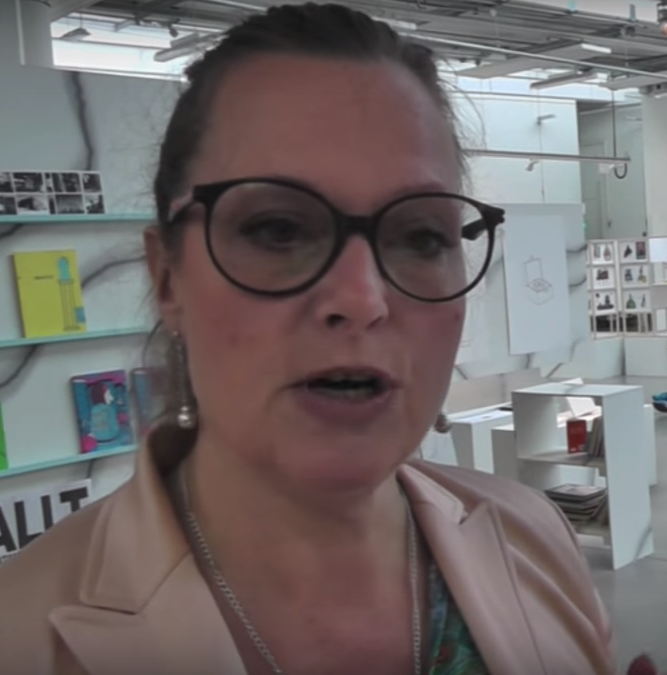
- Lantz in 2013
- Born: 5 July 1962 (age 64)
- Occupation: Academic

Maria Lantz is a Swedish artist working in the fields of photography, text and collaborative art projects. She is former Vice-Chancellor at Konstfack, the University College of Arts, Crafts and Design in Stockholm. She has written critique and reviews for Dagens Nyheter and the Swedish Radio. From 2023 she holds a position as Adjunct Professor at Malmö University.

== Life ==
Lantz was born in 1962.

Maria Lantz has exhibited in major venues in Europe including Umeå Bildmuseum (2009), Botkyrka Konsthall (2008), BB3, Bucharest Biennale, Bucharest Romania (2008), Liljevalchs konsthall, Stockholm (2007) and the Townhouse Gallery in Cairo, Egypt. She was the co-editor of the book Dharavi: Documenting Informalities.
