= Ida Granqvist =

Swedish missionary

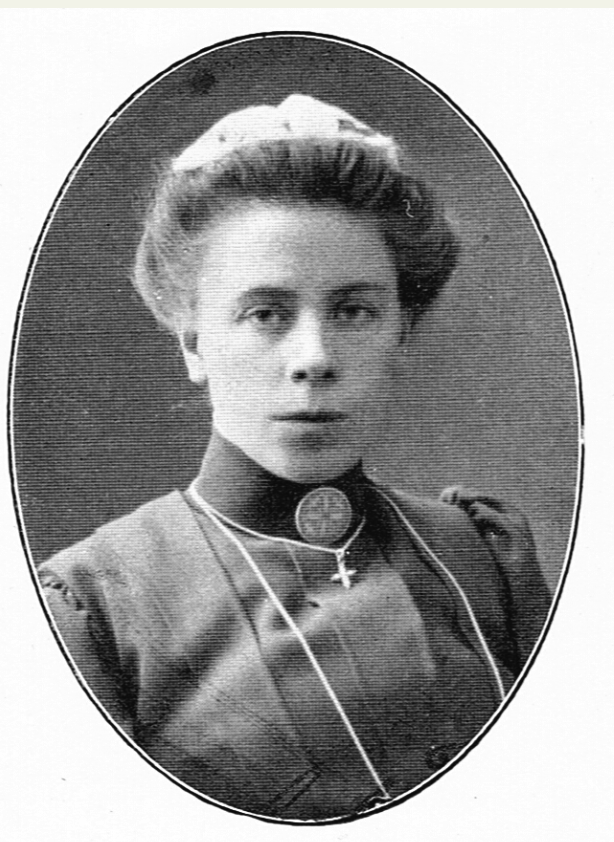
- Born: 12 November 1872; Rackeby church parish
- Died: 10 March 1949 (aged 76); Nylöse church parish
- Occupation: Missionary

Ida Granqvist (12 November 1872 – 10 March 1949) was a Swedish missionary. She wrote 26 books of poetry and translated hundreds of texts into isiZulu whilst a missionary in South Africa. She was criticised for speaking from a pulpit (like a man) whilst in Sweden.

== Life ==
Granqvist was born in 1872 in Rackeby church parish. Her parents were Ida and Johannes Granqvist who was a pastor. She was given second place by the Swedish Academy for her song cycle Gransus in 1899 and she published the first of her 26 books of poetry ''Drom'' in 1900. She was devoted to her father and wrote one of her collections of poems in tribute in 1907. They had spoken about mission work and after his death she was accepted as a missionary. At the time this was the closest that women could get to being a priest as they were not allowed to preach, but as a missionary, women could tell "stories".

She returned to Sweden in 1915 and committed herself again to missionary work in 1921.

She was criticised for speaking from a pulpit (like a man) whilst in Sweden.

Her health commanded that she return to Uppsala in 1928 where she went to work for the Swedish Church missionary office. In 1936 a book of hymns in isiZulu, Trospsalmer (in Swedish), was published and the hymns were nearly all the creation or translation of Granqvist. She continued at the missionary office until 1941. She moved to Gothenburg where she died in 1949.
