= 1883 in Sweden =

- Decades: 1860s; 1870s; 1880s; 1890s; 1900s
- See also: Other events of 1883; Timeline of Swedish history

Events from the year 1883 in Sweden

== Incumbents ==
- Monarch – Oscar II
- Prime Minister – Arvid Posse, Carl Johan Thyselius

== Events ==
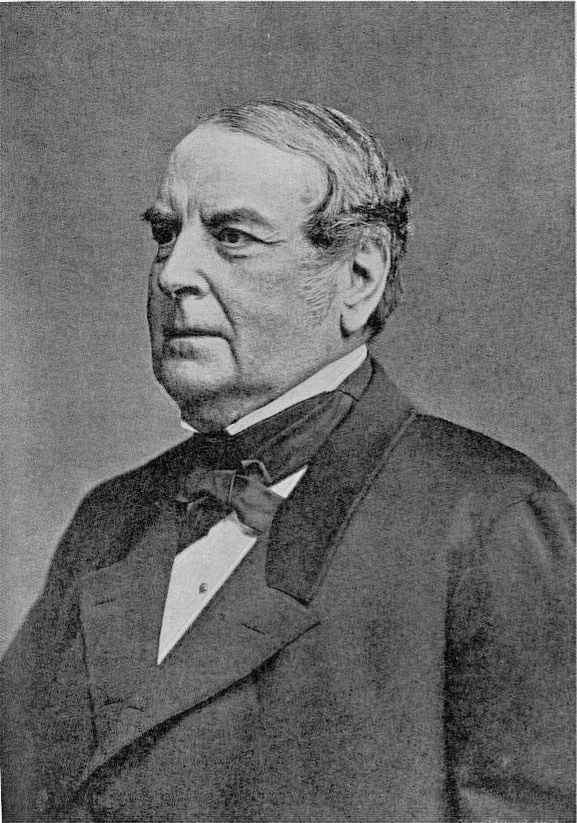
Carl Johan Thyselius, Prime Minister 1883–84.

- 17 January – Elektriska Aktiebolaget, the company that later became ASEA and eventually part of ABB, is founded in Stockholm by Ludvig Fredholm and Jonas Wenström.
- 13 June - Carl Johan Thyselius assumed the position of Prime Minister of Sweden succeeding Arvid Posse. He was the first Swedish Prime Minister who was not a nobleman. (source: Swedish national encyclopedia)
- 3 August: Amusement park Gröna Lund on the island of Djurgården in Stockholm is inaugurated.
- 11 December – The Salvation Army establishes its corps in Uppsala, expanding the organization’s activities beyond Stockholm and holding a gathering at the city’s theatre.
- Date unknown - Swedish Peace and Arbitration Society is founded. It becomes one of the world's oldest peace organizations. (source: Svenska Freds official website)
- Date unknown - Ellen Fries becomes the first female PhD holder.
- Date unknown - Katarina Elevator, connecting Slussen with Södermalm, becomes a prominent landmark.
- Date unknown - IS Lyckans Soldater is founded in Gothenburg.
- Date unknown – Stockholm University Student Union is founded.
- Date unknown - Swedish Chemical Society is founded to promote chemistry in Sweden.
- Date unknown – The Swedish Post Office Savings Bank is established.
- Date unknown – The Kumla–Yxhult Railway opens.

== Births ==
- 5 January – Werner Jernström, Swedish Olympic sport shooter (died 1930)
- 8 February – Gregori Aminoff, artist and mineralogist (died 1947)
- 3 March – Birger Simonsson, Swedish painter, illustrator, and professor (died 1938)
- 19 August – Axel Pehrsson-Bramstorp, future prime minister of Sweden (died 1954)
- 19 September – Hjalmar Bergman, Swedish writer and playwright (died 1931)
- 27 September – Ragnar Bernhardson-Sandstén, artist (died 1964)
- 23 October - Helge Werner, Swedish Olympic fencer (died 1953)
- 30 October – Emil Olovson, journalist and politician (died 1951)
- 17 November – Erik Granfelt, gymnast (died 1962).
- 19 November – Ossian Elgström, ethnologist, writer, and artist (died 1950)
- 6 December – Anders Hylander, gymnast (died 1967).
- 23 December – Hjalmar Cedercrona, gymnast (died 1969).

== Deaths ==
- 24 January – Carl Skånberg, Swedish painter (born 1850)
- 12 February – Rosa Carlén, Swedish novelist (born 1836)
- 16 February – Fredrik Ekenman, mayor, judge, and politician (born 1812)
- 24 February – Jan Anderson, landowner and politician (born 1831)
- 6 May - Cecilia Fryxell, educator (born 1806)
- 13 July – Theodor Elfstedt, magistrate and politician (born 1819)
- 13 August – Frithiof Grafström, clergyman, writer, and politician (born 1827)
- 22 September – Güllich Wallén, landowner and politician (born 1805)
- 28 September – Carl Johan Svensén, farmer and politician (born 1823)
- 28 November – Peter von Möller, landowner and politician (born 1809)
- 30 November – Sven Nilsson, Swedish zoologist and archaeologist (born 1787)
- 18 December – Leonard Dahm, school principal, textbook author, politician, and donor (born 1812)
