= Gustaf Andersson (sport shooter) =

Swedish sports shooter

Personal information
- Born: 3 December 1885 Lidköping, Sweden
- Died: 17 April 1969 (aged 83) Lidköping, Sweden

Sport
- Sport: Sports shooting

Gustaf Andersson (3 December 1885 – 17 April 1969) was a Swedish sports shooter. He competed at the 1924 Summer Olympics and the 1932 Summer Olympics.
