= Stella (Swedish magazine) =

19th century science fiction magazine from Sweden

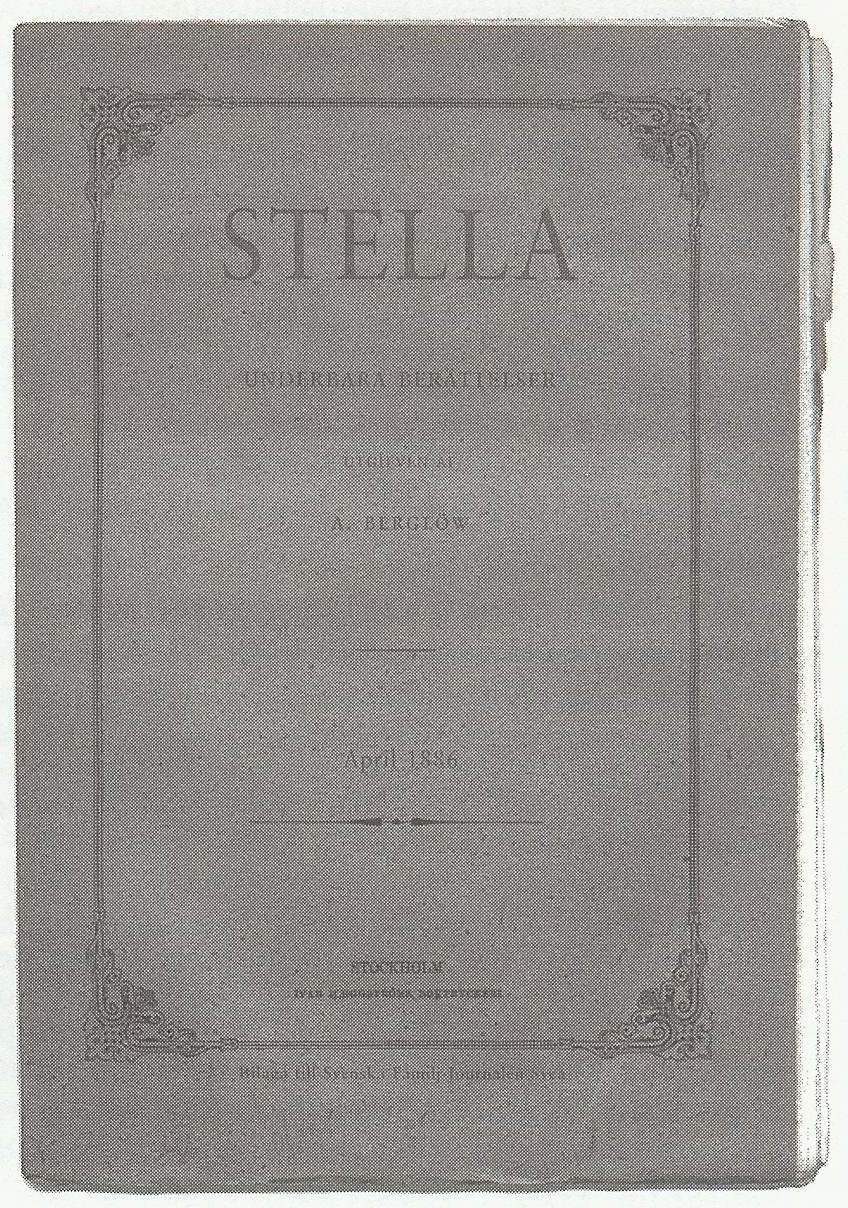
Supposed cover.

Stella was a Swedish science fiction magazine.

The magazine was published from April 1886 to August 1888 as a supplement to the Swedish weekly Svenska Familj-Journalen Svea and published translations of short stories by the leading science fiction writers of its time.

Though many works about science fiction refer to Stella, finding traces or copies of the magazine has proved difficult and some have concluded that Stella was a practical joke on the part of Swedish critic Sam J. Lundwall.
