= Karl Lindahl =

Swedish artistic gymnast

- Full name: Karl Fritz Lindahl
- Born: 26 September 1890 Stockholm, United Kingdoms of Sweden and Norway
- Died: 29 June 1960 (aged 69) Stockholm, Sweden

Gymnastics career
- Discipline: Men's artistic gymnastics
- Country represented: Sweden
- Club: Kristliga Förening av Unga Mäns Gymnastikavdelningar
Medal record
Men's artistic gymnastics
Representing Sweden
Olympic Games
Gold medal – first place	1920 Antwerp	Team, Swedish system

Karl Fritz Lindahl (26 September 1890 – 29 June 1960) was a Swedish gymnast who competed in the 1920 Summer Olympics. He was part of the Swedish team, which was able to win the gold medal in the men's gymnastics team, Swedish system event in 1920.
