= Karin Ek (writer) =

Swedish writer (1885–1926)

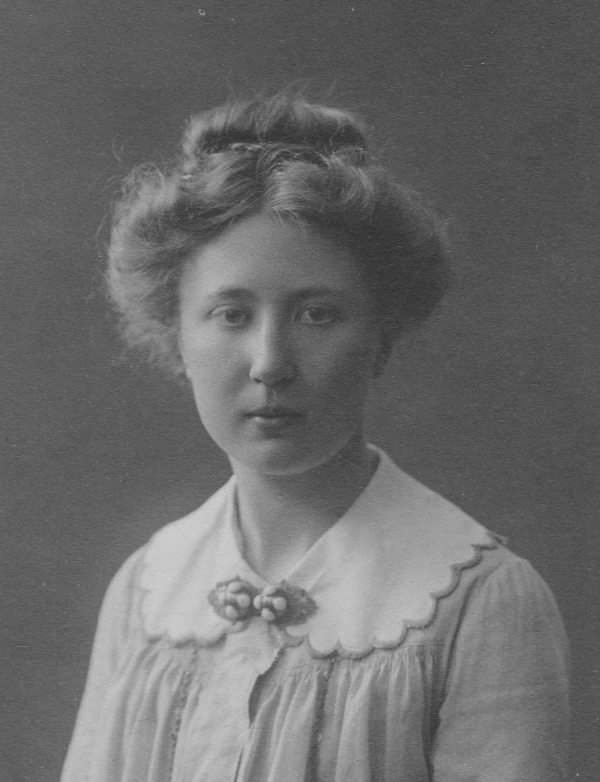
Karin Ek

Karin Valborg Ek, born Lindblad (17 June 1885 in Stockholm -1 October 1926 in Gothenburg), was a Swedish writer.

== Biography ==
Ek was the daughter of the doctor Anders Lindblad and Florence Weaving. She grew up in Stockholm, and attended Anna Sandström's Higher Teacher Seminarium, in Stockholm together with Harriet Löwenhjelm and Elsa Björkman.

After a brief career as a subject teacher, she married the literary historian Sverker Ek in 1909. The couple had five children, including the actor Anders Ek and the publisher Birgitta Ek.

Karin Valborg Ek passed away in Gothenburg in 1926 and was laid to rest at Östra kyrkogården.
