= 1890 in Sweden =

- Decades: 1870s; 1880s; 1890s; 1900s; 1910s
- See also: Other events of 1890; Timeline of Swedish history

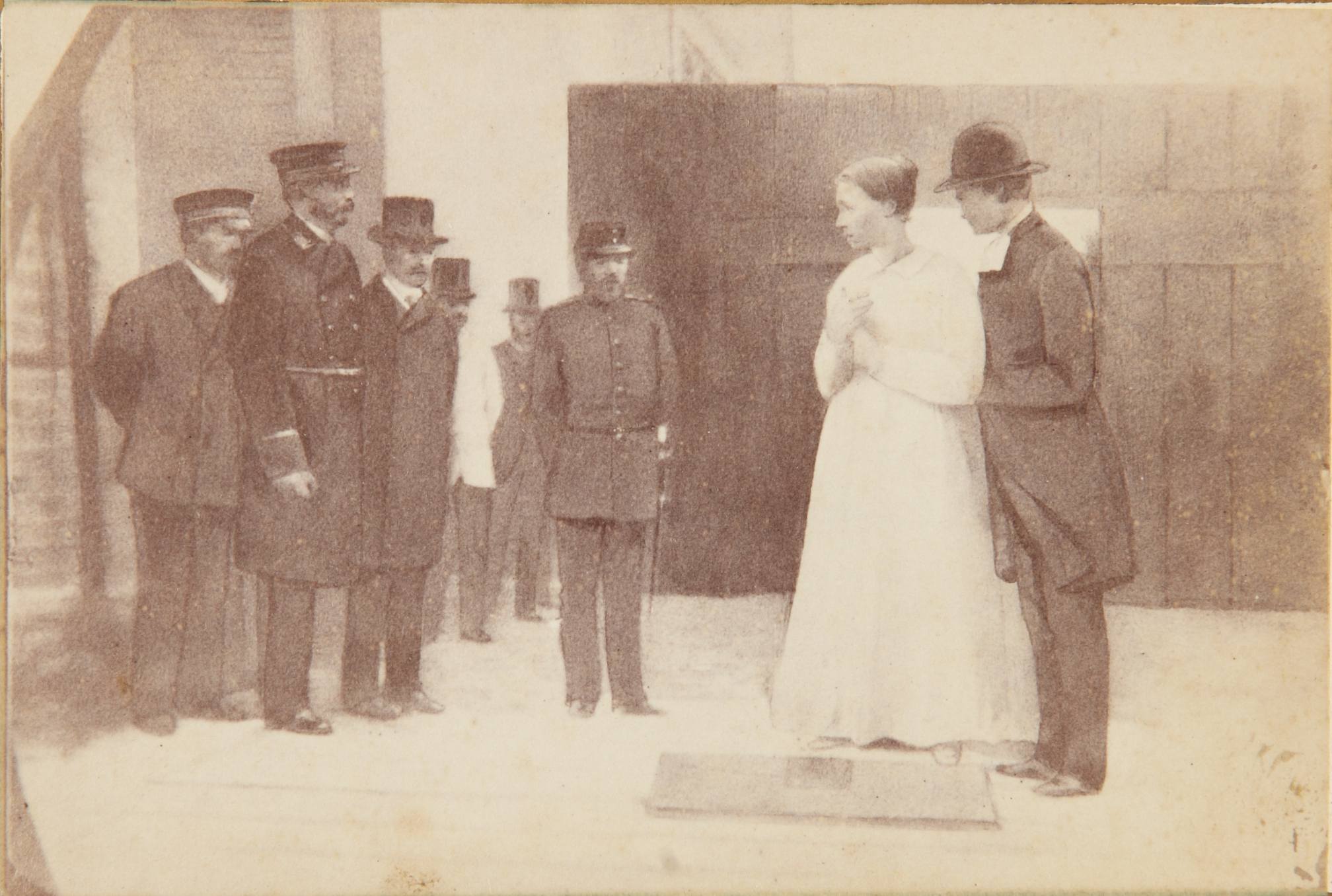
Yngsjö's murderer

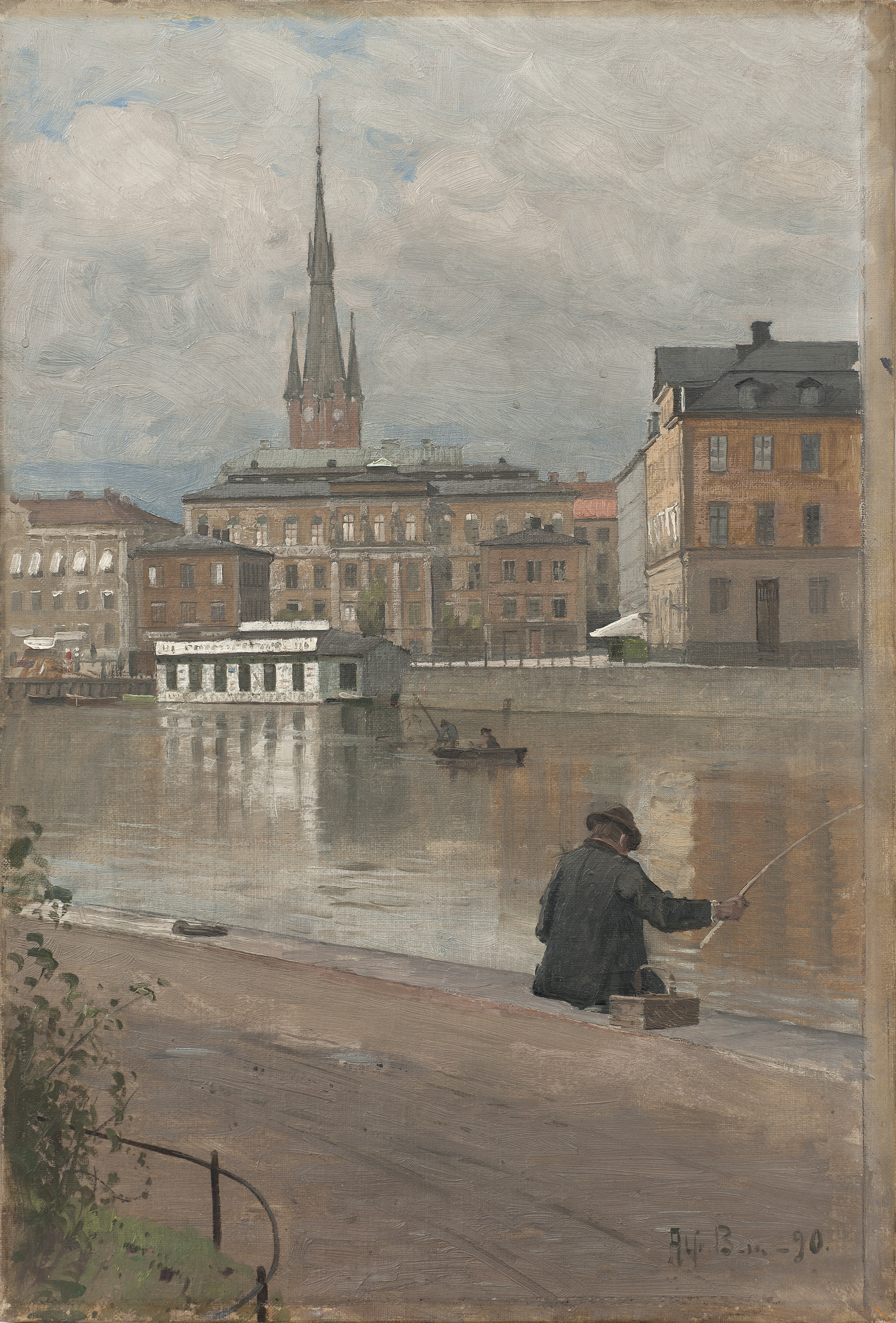

Events from the year 1890 in Sweden

== Incumbents ==
- Monarch – Oscar II
- Prime Minister – Gustaf Åkerhielm.

== Events ==
- - The mining company Luossavaara-Kiirunavaara Aktiebolag (LKAB) founded.
- - The newspaper Upsala Nya Tidning founded.
- - KFUM Örebro
- - LKAB
- - Nordstjernan
- - Uddevalla Suffrage Association
- - Lilly Engström became the first female member of a Board of education.
- 7 August - Anna Månsdotter became the last woman in Sweden to be executed.

== Births ==
- 26 January – Carlos Adlercreutz, military officer (died 1963).
- 7 March – Gustaf Weidel, gymnast (died 1959).
- 27 April – Karl Asplund, poet, short story writer and art historian (died 1978).
- 28 August – Gustaf Dyrsch, horse rider (died 1974).
- 26 September – Karl Lindahl, gymnast (died 1960).
- 2 November – Moa Martinson, author (died 1964).

== Deaths ==
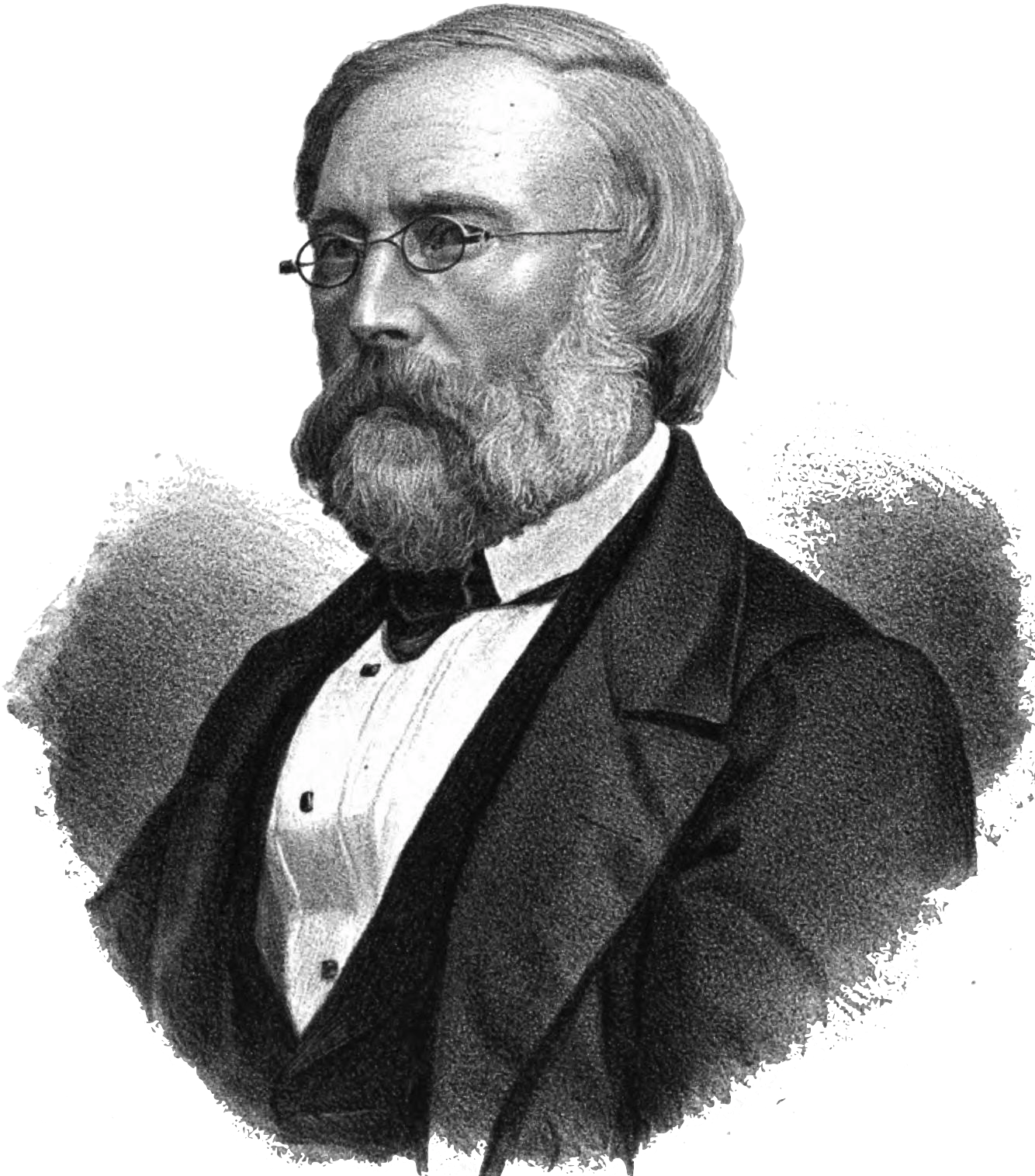
Gustaf Wilhelm Palm

- 8 March - Josefina Deland, women's rights activist (born 1814)
- 8 May – Herman Schultz, astronomer (born 1823).
- 20 September – Gustaf Wilhelm Palm, landscape painter and art professor (born 1810).
- 7 October – Edvard Perséus, painter (born 1841).
- 11 November - Emilie Risberg, writer and reform pedagogue (born 1815)
