= Carl Jonsson =

Swedish policeman and tug of war competitor

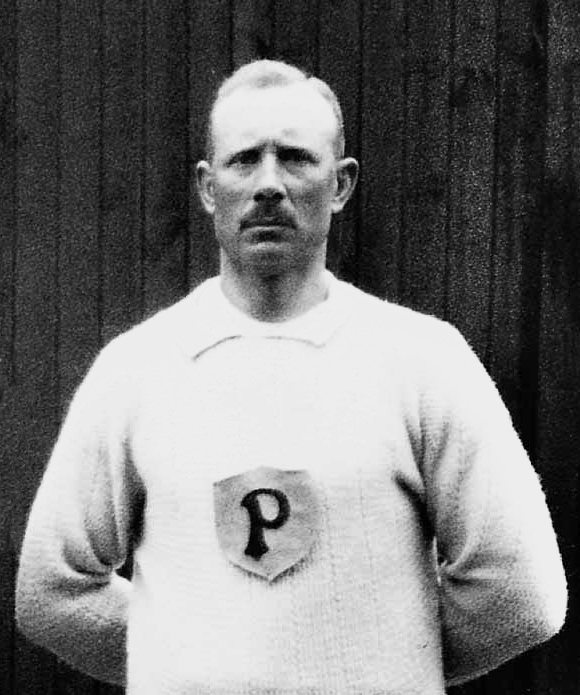
- Jonsson at the 1912 Olympics

Personal information
- Born: 16 July 1885 Ryd, Jönköping, Sweden
- Died: 11 November 1966 (aged 81) Ryd, Jönköping, Sweden

Sport
- Sport: Tug of war
- Club: Stockholmspolisens IF
Medal record
Representing Sweden
Olympic Games
Gold medal – first place	1912 Stockholm	Team competition

Carl Jonsson (16 July 1885 – 11 November 1966) was a Swedish policeman who won a gold medal in the tug of war competition at the 1912 Summer Olympics.
