= Timeline of Swedish history =

This is a timeline of Swedish history, comprising important legal and territorial changes and political events in Sweden. To read about the background to these events, see History of Sweden. See also the list of Swedish monarchs and list of prime ministers of Sweden.

== 1st century – 5th century ==
Year	Date	Event

== 6th century – 9th century ==
Year	Date	Event
530		Posited date of possibly legendary Battle on the Ice of Lake Vänern
c. 551		Getica of Jordanes, history of the Gothic people, written in Constantinople
750–790		Trade center Birka, island on Lake Mälaren near present-day Stockholm, established
750s		Beginnings of Scandinavian colonisation along Varangian trade routes (Baltic states to Black Sea)
c. 793		Approximate beginning of Viking Age
800		Rök runestone carved
829		Ansgar's first mission to introduce Christianity to Sweden
850s		Olof I campaigns in Courland (present day western Latvia)

== 10th century ==
Year	Date	Event
960		Settlement at Birka abandoned
980		City of Sigtuna founded
984		Battle of Fyrisvellir near present day Uppsala; Swedish and Geat tribes unite for first time under Eric the Victorious
990		City of Lund founded
995		Olof Skötkonung, first Swedish king of whom there is substantial historical knowledge, succeeds to throne

== 11th century ==
Year	Date	Event
1000		Gothi (pagan chieftain-priest) Þorgeirr Ljósvetningagoði endorses Christianity
1004		Olof Skötkonung baptized; begins adoption of Christianity as official religion
1020		The city of Lund is founded
1036		Ingvar the Far-Travelled leads unsuccessful Viking attack against Persia
1085		City of Helsingborg founded
1087		Temple at Uppsala, the central place of worship within Ancient Norse paganism, destroyed at order of King Inge the Elder.

== 12th century ==
Year	Date	Event
1100		Vreta Abbey, first Christian convent in Sweden, established
1187		Estonians, Curonians or/and Karelians invade and pillage Sigtuna killing archbishop Johannes
1187		City of Nyköping founded

== 13th century ==
Year	Date	Event
1208		Battle of Lena
c. 1215		Eskil Magnusson, first historically attested lawspeaker of Thing of all Swedes (held in Tiundaland, present day Uppland)
c. 1220		Gutalagen law book (also containing the Gutasaga)
1240		Battle of the Neva
1252		City of Stockholm founded
1280		Ordinance of Alsnö gives birth to the frälse, a class of tax-exempt secular nobility

== 14th century ==
Year	Date	Event
1306	29 September	Håtuna games: coup against King Birger by his brothers, Eric and Valdemar Magnusson
1310		Peace of Helsingborg settles conflicts between Sweden, Norway and Denmark
1317	11 December	Nyköping Banquet, Christmas celebration, after which King Birger imprisons his two brothers and starves them to death
1319		Sweden and Norway first unite
1323		Treaty of Nöteborg establishes peace between Sweden and the Novgorod Republic
1344		Bridgettine Order founded by St. Bridget (Heliga Birgitta)
1350		Black Death arrives in Sweden
1359		Magnus IV summons first Riksdag (parliament of Sweden)
1389	24 February	Battle of Åsle; King Albert deposed
1397		Sweden, Denmark and Norway unite into the Kalmar Union (1397-1523)
1398		Gotland conquered by Teutonic Knights

== 15th century ==
Year	Date	Event
1409		Teutonic Order sells Gotland to the Kalmar Union
1434		Start of Engelbrekt rebellion against King Erik of Pomerania
1435		Assembly of Swedish nobility at Arboga, considered first Riksdag of the Estates
1436		Engelbrekt Engelbrektsson assassinated
1471		Battle of Brunkeberg
1477		Foundation of Uppsala University
1495		Russo-Swedish War (1495-1497)

== 16th century ==
Year	Date	Event
1505		First Kalmar Bloodbath
1520		Christina Gyllenstierna defends Stockholm but is defeated by the Danes under Christian II of Denmark; Christian is crowned king of Sweden and orders Stockholm bloodbath
1523		Gustav Vasa liberates Stockholm, leading Sweden out of the Kalmar Union and initiating monarchical rule of the House of Vasa
1524		Treaty of Malmö signed: The Danish king formally renounce his claim to Sweden; Sweden in return renounces claims to Scania and Blekinge
1525		First Dalecarlian Rebellion occurs in parallel with attempt by Christina Gyllenstierna and Sören Norby to take Swedish throne
1526		First Swedish translation of New Testament published
1529		Westrogothian Rebellion
1531		Third Dalecarlian Rebellion, also known as the Bell Rebellion (Klockupproret) begins; suppressed two years later
1535		War with Lübeck leads to expulsion of Hanseatic traders, ending previous Hanseatic League monopoly on foreign trade
1540		First full Swedish translation of Bible, the Gustav Vasa Bible, published
1542		Nils Dacke starts peasant uprising in Småland, defeated the following year
1554		Border skirmishes between Sweden and Russia lead to outbreak of Russo-Swedish War (1554-1557)
1555		A Description of the Northern Peoples (Historia de Gentibus Septentrionalibus) by Olaus Magnus published
1561		Estonia becomes a Swedish dominion
1567		Sture Murders carried out on the orders of Eric XIV
1577	26 February	Eric XIV dies in imprisonment
1584		City of Karlstad founded
1592		Poland and Sweden enter into a short-lived personal union following crowning of Sigismund III Vasa as King of Sweden
1598		Conflict between Duke Charles, later King Charles IX, and Sigismund, King of Sweden and Poland, leads to outbreak of the War against Sigismund
1598	25 September	Battle of Stångebro
1599		War against Sigismund ends, resulting in deposition of King Sigismund; Sigismund's followers targeted in second Kalmar Bloodbath and the Åbo Bloodbath

== 17th century ==
Year	Date	Event
1600	20 March	Linköping Bloodbath
1610		Ingrian War between Russia and Sweden begins
1611		Denmark declares war on Sweden, initiating Kalmar War
1613		Treaty of Knäred ends Kalmar War: Sweden obligated to pay Älvsborg Ransom of one million rixdollars for return of fortress of Älvsborg
1614		City of Kristianstad founded
1617	27 February	Treaty of Stolbovo ends Ingrian War: Russia cedes province and fortress of Kexholm, southwestern Karelia and province of Ingria to Sweden, laying foundation for Sweden's rise as a Great Power
1621		City of Gothenburg founded
1628	10 August	Sinking of the Swedish warship Vasa
1630		Sweden enters the Thirty Years' War (1618-1648)
1631	13 April	Battle of Frankfurt an der Oder
1631	7 September	Battle of Breitenfeld
1632	6 November	Battle of Lützen: King Gustav II Adolf killed
1638		Colony of New Sweden established along the Delaware River in North America
1648		Thirty Years' War ends, with Sweden among the winners; Peace of Westphalia grants Sweden the provinces of Western Pomerania, Wismar, and the bishoprics of Bremen-Verden
1650		Colony of Swedish Gold Coast established on Gulf of Guinea in present-day Ghana
1654		Queen Christina abdicates throne and converts to Roman Catholicism, creating major scandal
1658	26 February	Treaty of Roskilde: Denmark-Norway cedes provinces of Blekinge, Bornholm, Bohuslän, Scania, Trøndelag and Halland to Sweden
1663		Colony of the Swedish Gold Coast seized by Denmark, and integrated into Danish Gold Coast
1666		Foundation of Lund University
1668		Foundation of Sweden's central bank, Sveriges Riksbank
1674	24 December	Sweden invades Brandenburg, triggering Swedish-Brandenburg War
1675		Denmark invades Scania, triggering Scanian War
1676	1 June	Battle of Öland
1676	17 August	Battle of Halmstad
1676	4 December	Battle of Lund
1677	26 June	Siege of Malmö
1677	14 July	Battle of Landskrona
1678		Invasion of Rügen
1679	23 August	Treaty of Fontainebleau signed, restoring all Danish conquests during the Scanian War to Sweden
1680		City of Karlskrona founded
1680		Great Reduction of 1680 enacted, returning to the Swedish Crown lands that had earlier been granted to the nobility
1697	7 May	Castle of Tre Kronor burns down, destroying a significant portion of Sweden's national library and royal archives

== 18th century ==
Year	Date	Event
1700	22 February	Alliance consisting of Denmark-Norway, Saxony, Poland and Russia declares war on Sweden, initiating Great Northern War
1700		Battle of Narva
1702	8 July	Battle of Kliszów
1706	3 February	Battle of Fraustadt ends in slaughter of captured prisoners by victorious Swedish army
1706	13 October	Invasion of Poland by Sweden results in Treaty of Altranstädt forcing King Augustus the Strong to renounce claim to Polish throne and break Treaty of Narva, his alliance with Russia
1708	1 January	Charles XII crosses Vistula, opening attempted Swedish invasion of Russia
1709	27 June	Battle of Poltava: destruction of Charles XII's invading Swedish army by defending Russian forces of Peter the Great marks beginning of Sweden's decline as a great power
1710	28 February	Battle of Helsingborg: final failed attempt by Denmark to regain Scania
1713	1 February	Skirmish at Bender, battle to remove Charles XII and the remnants of his army from the Ottoman Empire
1718	30 November	Charles XII killed at Frederikshald
1719		Treaties of Stockholm, requiring Sweden to cede parts of Swedish Pomerania to Prussia and Bremen-Verden to Hanover
1720		Treaty of Frederiksborg, requiring Sweden to cede Schleswig to Denmark-Norway
1721		Treaty of Nystad, requiring Sweden to cede Estonia, Livonia and Ingria to Russia
1731		Foundation of Swedish East India Company
1732		Carl Linnaeus departs on his Expedition to Lapland
1734		Civil Code of 1734 establishes unified code of law for Sweden
1735		First edition of Linnaeus' Systema Naturae
1737		Swedish language Theater of Bollhuset founded
1739	2 June	Foundation of Royal Swedish Academy of Sciences
1741	23 August	Battle of Villmanstrand
1742		Anders Celsius proposes Celsius temperature scale
1743		Fourth Dalecarlian Rebellion breaks out
1747		Olof von Dalin begins publication of his Swedish history, Svea Rikes Historia
1749		Storskifte Enclosure Act begins long period of major land reform in Sweden
1756		Quelling of attempted coup d'état by Queen Louisa Ulrika and a few devoted nobles to reinstate absolute monarchy in Sweden
1757		Sweden enters Seven Years' War (1756-1763)
1762	22 May	Treaty of Hamburg concludes Sweden's involvement in Seven Years' War
1766		Freedom of the Press Act enacted: censorship abolished apart from limitations on vocal opposition to the king and the Church of Sweden
1768		December Crisis (1768) fails to increase royal power
1772		Absolute monarchy reintroduced through the Revolution of 1772
1773		Discovery of oxygen by Carl Wilhelm Scheele
1773		Royal Swedish Opera founded
1782		Sweden purchases Caribbean island of Saint Barthélemy from France
1786	20 March	Foundation of Swedish Academy
1787		First secondary education school in Sweden for girls, Societetsskolan, founded in Gothenburg
1788		Sweden declares war against Russia, initiating Russo-Swedish War (1788–1790)
1790		Treaty of Värälä concludes Russo-Swedish War, confirming status quo ante bellum with respect to borders
1792	16 March	King Gustav III assassinated at a masked ball

== 19th century ==
Year	Date	Event
1807		General Enclosure Act of 1807 intensifies land reform measures
1808		Outbreak of Finnish War
1809		Conclusion of Finnish War: Sweden cedes Finland to Russia
1809		Deposition of King Gustav IV Adolf in coup of 1809
1810		Foundation of Karolinska Institutet
1814		Sweden and Norway unite (1814-1905)
1832		Completion of Göta Canal, providing route from Gothenburg (west coast) to Söderköping (east coast)
1848		Series of riots, the Marsoroligheterna, in Stockholm
1855		Construction begins on Sweden's first railway line
1864		Daily newspaper Dagens Nyheter established
1867		Telecommunications company, Ericsson, founded by Lars Magnus Ericsson
1867		Alfred Nobel invents dynamite
1873		Sweden and Denmark form Scandinavian Monetary Union
1873		Swedish krona replaces Swedish riksdaler as national currency
1876		Office of prime minister (statsminister) instituted
1878		Island of Saint Barthélemy sold back to France
1884		Daily newspaper Svenska Dagbladet established
1884		Fredrika Bremer Association, Sweden's oldest women's rights organization, founded
1889		Swedish Social Democratic Party founded
1897		Arctic balloon expedition of Salomon August Andrée
1898		Formation of the Swedish Trade Union Confederation (LO)

== 20th century ==
Year	Date	Event
1901		First Nobel Prizes awarded
1903		Foundation of Swedish Employers' Association (SAF)
1904		Moderate Party (Moderaterna) founded
1905		Personal union between Sweden and Norway peacefully dissolved
1906		Official spelling reform of Swedish language, simplifying previous forms
1909		Stockholm School of Economics (Handelshögskolan i Stockholm) founded
1909		General strike of 1909
1910		SAC Syndikalisterna established
1919		AB Svensk Filmindustri established
1921	30 June	Capital punishment abolished for all crimes committed in peacetime
1933	24 February	Swedish Association for Sexuality Education founded
1934		Crisis in the Population Question (Kris i befolkningsfrågan) by Alva and Gunnar Myrdal published and plays major role in design of Sweden's welfare policy
1938		Saltsjöbaden Agreement establishes rules for collective bargaining and trade relations
1943		Food packaging company, Tetra Pak, founded by Ruben Rausing
1945	17 January	Raoul Wallenberg detained by Soviet authorities in Budapest and subsequently disappears
1947		Furniture company IKEA is founded by Ingvar Kamprad
1954	29 October	Sweden conducts its first television broadcast
1957		Ingmar Bergman's The Seventh Seal (Det sjunde inseglet)
1967	3 September	Right-hand traffic introduced
1971		The Riksdag becomes unicameral
1973		Norrmalmstorg bank robbery and hostage crisis
1974	6 April	ABBA song Waterloo becomes the group's first global hit
1976	30 January	Swedish authorities arrest internationally acclaimed film-maker Ingmar Bergman for alleged tax evasion and Bergman suffers nervous breakdown; charges declared unfounded and dropped 23 March
1986	28 February	Murder of Prime Minister and Social Democratic leader Olof Palme
1994		MS Estonia sinks en route from Tallinn to Stockholm; 852 people on board lose their lives
1995		Sweden joins in the European Union
1999		Church of Sweden separates from state and becomes independent organization
1999	12 October	Murder of Björn Söderberg by fascists in Stockholm

== 21st century ==
Year	Date	Event
2000	1 July	Øresund Bridge opened, creating road and railway connection between Sweden and mainland Europe
2003		Voters decide not to adopt euro as the country's official currency
2009	1 May	Same-sex marriage legalized in Sweden
2010		Military conscription paused
2018		Military conscription reactivated
2024	7 March	Sweden joins in NATO

== See also ==
- Timeline of Faroese history
- Timeline of Icelandic history

Cities in Sweden

- Timeline of Gothenburg
- Timeline of Stockholm history
