= 1957 in Sweden =

- Decades: 1930s; 1940s; 1950s; 1960s; 1970s
- See also: Other events of 1957; Timeline of Swedish history

Events from the year 1957 in Sweden

== Incumbents ==
- Monarch – Gustaf VI Adolf
- Prime Minister – Tage Erlander

== Events ==
- 13 October – Swedish pensions system referendum

== Popular culture ==
=== Sport ===
- 7 to 15 March – The World Table Tennis Championships were held in Stockholm

=== Film ===
- 1 July – Med glorian på sned released

== Births ==
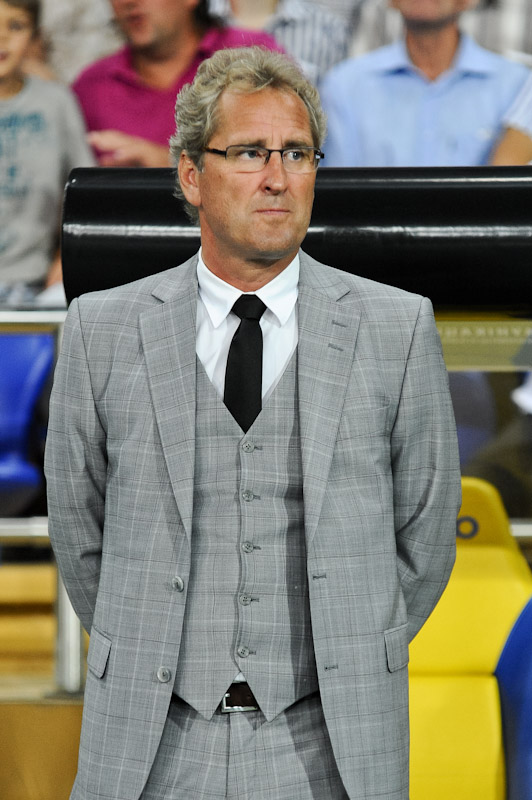
Erik Hamrén, manager of the Swedish national football team 2009–16

=== January–March ===
- 25 January – Eskil Erlandsson, politician
- 25 February – Ing-Marie Carlsson, actress
- 6 March – Elisabeth Leidinge, football goalkeeper
- 9 March – Mona Sahlin, politician
- 17 March – Sissela Kyle, actress, comedian, and theatre director
- 28 March – Jessica Zandén, film actress

=== April–June ===
- 19 June – Anna Lindh, politician and former Swedish Minister of Foreign Affairs (d. 2003)
- 27 June – Erik Hamrén, football player and manager

=== July–September ===
- 21 July – Stefan Löfven, politician and former Prime Minister of Sweden
- 20 August – Mary Stävin, actress
- 23 August – Örjan Blomquist, cross-country skier (d. 2008)
- 25 August – Christer Björkman, singer and television producer

=== October–December ===
- 4 October – Anders Flanking, politician
- 10 October – Sten Melin, composer
- 3 November – Dolph Lundgren, Swedish actor and martial artist

=== Full date unknown ===
- Eva Hellstrand, farmer and a Swedish politician.

== Deaths ==
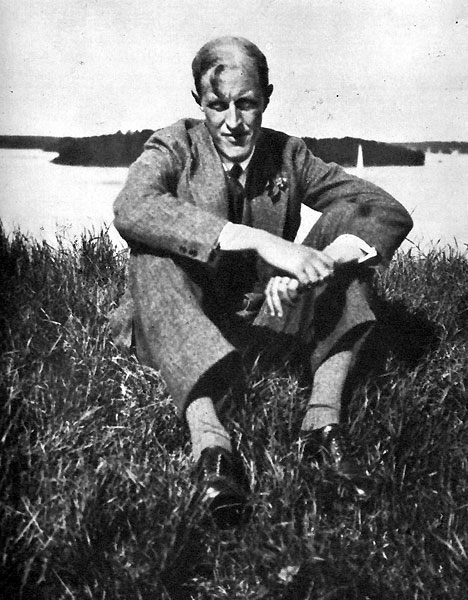
Sten Selander

- 24 January – Hans Lindman, football player (born 1884).
- 8 April – Sten Selander, writer and scientist (born 1891).
- 15 April – Fredrik Rosencrantz, horse rider (born 1879)
- 13 June – Carl Bonde, military officer and horse rider (born 1872).
- 30 September – Hjalmar Johansson, diver, swimmer and track and field athlete (born 1874)
- 18 November – Carl Ström, film actor (born 1880)
