= 1801 in Sweden =

- Decades: 1780s; 1790s; 1800s; 1810s; 1820s
- See also: Other events of 1801; Timeline of Swedish history

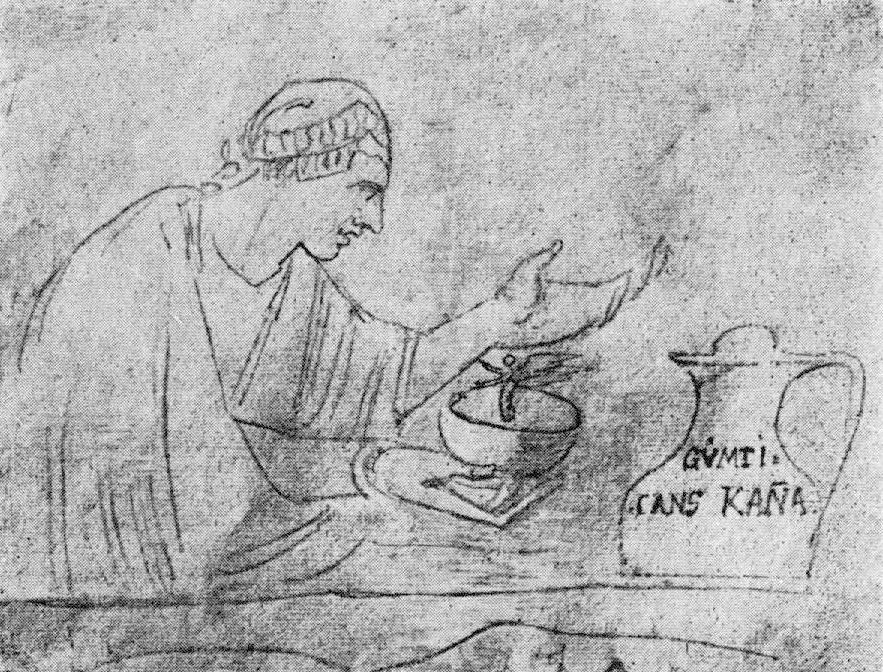
Ulrica Arfvidsson, contemporary drawing

Events from the year 1801 in Sweden

== Incumbents ==
- Monarch – Gustav IV Adolf

== Events ==
- The Swedish colony of Saint Barthélemy is occupied by Great Britain.
- Carl Gustaf af Leopold publishes the Afhandling om svenska stafsättet
- The Second League of Armed Neutrality, an alliance of Denmark–Norway, Prussia, Sweden, and Russia dissolves.
- Foundation of the Djurgårdsteatern in Stockholm, the only theater except the Royal Dramatic Theater allowed to function in the capital during the 1798–1842 royal theater monopoly.

== Births ==
- 22 January – Lars Johan Hierta, newspaper publisher, social critic, businessman and politician (died 1872)
- 1 February – Adolf Fredrik Lindblad, composer (died 1878)
- 24 March – Immanuel Nobel, engineer, architect, inventor and industrialist (died 1872)
- 9 May – Ulrika von Strussenfelt, writer (died 1873)
- 17 May – Lovisa Åhrberg, herbalist doctor (died 1881)
- 21 May – Princess Sophie of Sweden, princess (died 1865)
- 26 July – Maria Röhl, portrait artist (died 1875)
- 14 August – Fredrika Bremer, writer (died 1865)
- 22 October – Carl Jakob Sundevall, zoologist (died 1875)
- 18 December – Ulrik Torsslow, actor (died 1881)
- Brita Sofia Hesselius, photographer (died 1866)

== Deaths ==
- Ulrica Arfvidsson, fortune teller (born 1734)
