= 1876 in Sweden =

- Decades: 1850s; 1860s; 1870s; 1880s; 1890s
- See also: Other events of 1876; Timeline of Swedish history

Events from the year 1876 in Sweden

== Incumbents ==
- Monarch – Oscar II
- Prime Minister – Louis Gerhard De Geer

== Events ==
- 20 March - Louis Gerhard De Geer becomes the first Prime Minister of Sweden.
- Date unknown - Lars Magnus Ericsson founds Ericsson.
- Date unknown - Freight Line Through Skåne
- Date unknown - Upsala-Lenna Jernväg
- Date unknown - The starting point of the hibernation of Karolina Olsson

== Births ==
- 21 January – Mathias Taube, actor and artist (died 1934)
- 11 April - Torine Torines, mechanic (died 1944)
- 10 November - Anna Johansson-Visborg, trade union worker, women's rights activist and politician (social democrat) (died 1953)
- Anna Sissak-Bardizbanian, reporter (died 1919)
- Mathilda Staël von Holstein, lawyer (died 1953)

== Deaths ==
- 10 February - August Söderman, composer (died 1832)
