= 1955 in Sweden =

- Decades: 1930s; 1940s; 1950s; 1960s; 1970s
- See also: Other events of 1955; Timeline of Swedish history

Events from the year 1955 in Sweden

== Incumbents ==
- Monarch – Gustaf VI Adolf
- Prime Minister – Tage Erlander

== Births ==
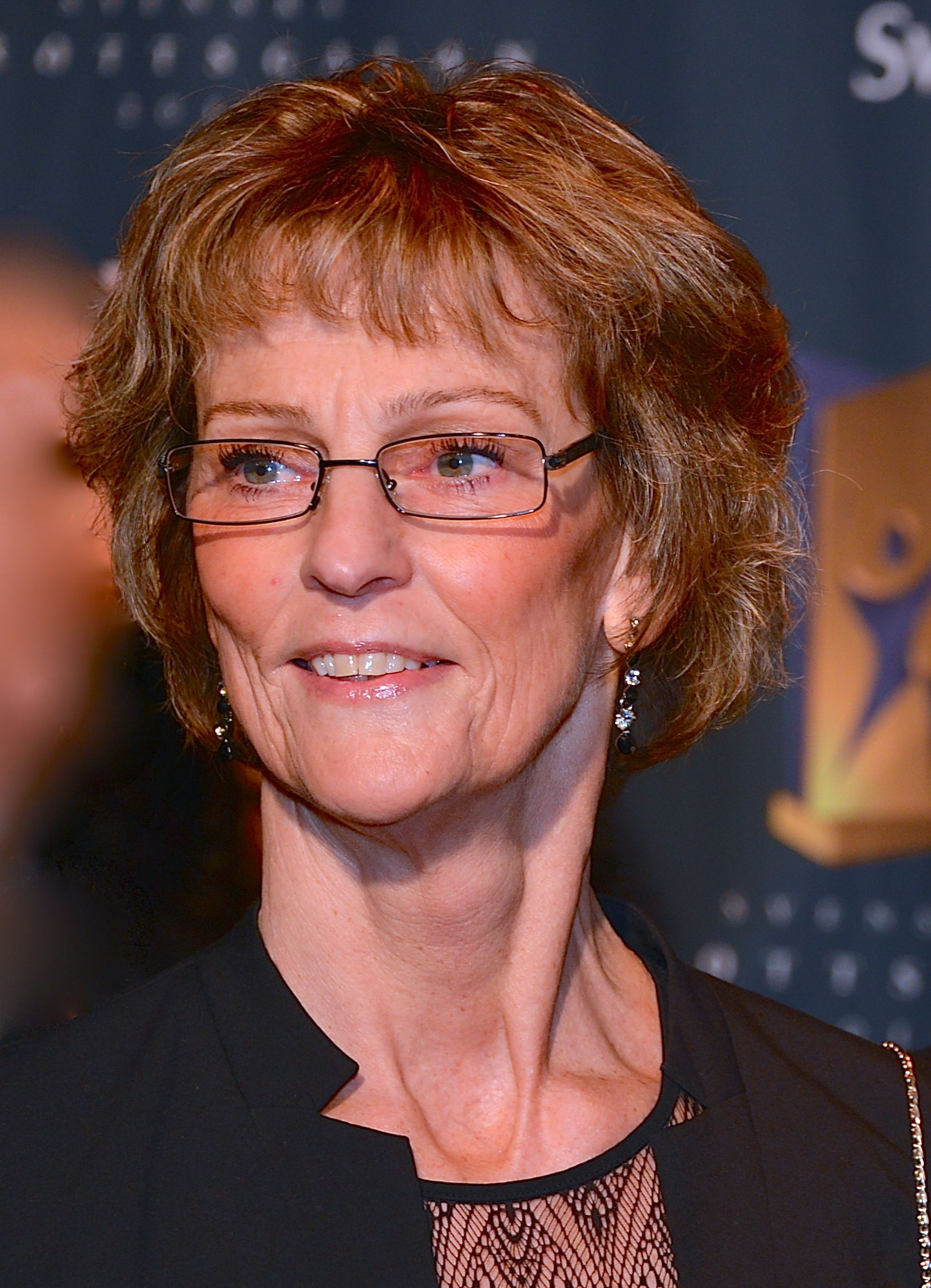
Ulrika Knape

- 5 January – Jacob Hård, journalist.
- 26 January – Björn Andrésen, actor (died 2025).
- 22 March – Lena Olin, actress.
- 29 March – Rolf Lassgård, actor.
- 26 April – Ulrika Knape, diver, Olympic champion from 1972.
- 4 July – Leif Högström, fencer.
- 2 October – Qristina Ribohn, reality TV personality and politician (died 2024).

=== Exact date unknown ===
- Ann Jäderlund, poet.

== Deaths ==
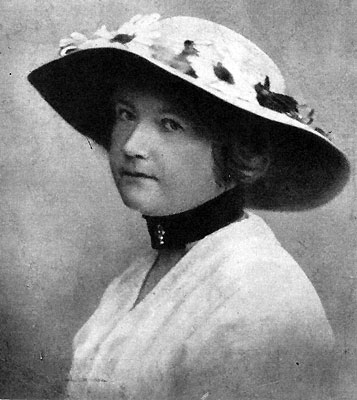
Fanny Alving

- 5 March – Paul Isberg, sailor (born 1887).
- 18 April – John Jarlén, gymnast (born 1880).
- 2 June – Fanny Alving, writer (born 1874).
- 27 September – Nils Adlercreutz, horse rider (born 1866).
