= 1799 in Sweden =

Events from the year 1799 in Sweden

== Incumbents ==
- Monarch – Gustav IV Adolf

== Events ==
- - Coffee is banned: due to the opposition, this unpopular law is abolished again in 1802.
- - Maximum seu archimetria by Thomas Thorild
- 14 December – The office of Lord High Chancellor of Sweden is abolished for the final time.

== Births ==
- 13 March - Maria Dorothea Dunckel, playwright (died 1878)
- 22 March – Fredrik Vilhelm August Argelander
- 24 March - Nils Almlöf, actor (died 1875)
- 31 October - Maria Fredrica von Stedingk, composer (died 1868)
- 9 November - Gustav, Prince of Vasa, prince (died 1877)
- 11 December - Charlotte Thitz, educator (died 1889)
- Helena Larsdotter Westerlund, educator (died 1865)

== Deaths ==
- 2 February - Dorothea Maria Lösch, war heroine (born 1730)
- 11 March - Anna Lisa Jermen, entrepreneur (born 1770)
- 25 May - Barbara Ekenberg, entrepreneur (born 1717)
- Anna Elisabeth Baer, ship owner (born 1722)
- Anna Maria Brandel, industrialist (born 1725)
