= 1878 in Sweden =

- Decades: 1850s; 1860s; 1870s; 1880s; 1890s
- See also: Other events of 1878; Timeline of Swedish history

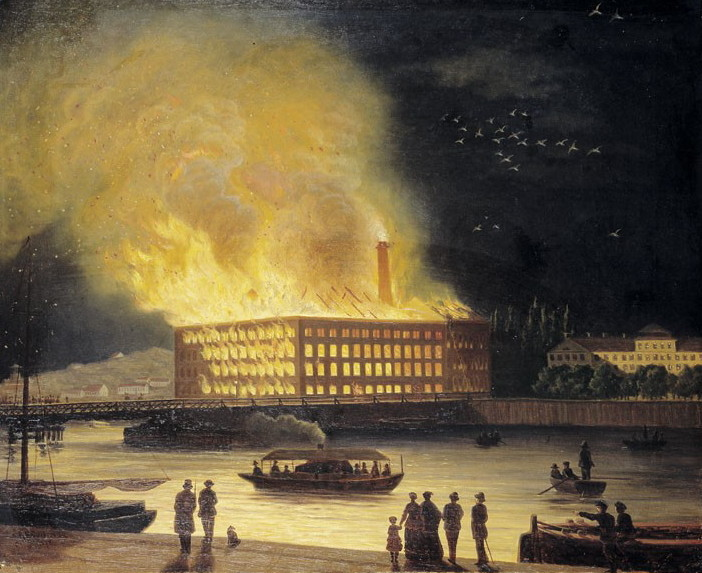
Eldkvarn 1878

Events from the year 1878 in Sweden

== Incumbents ==
- Monarch – Oscar II
- Prime Minister – Louis Gerhard De Geer

== Events ==
- 21 July - The Vega Expedition starts
- August – Mission Covenant Church of Sweden is founded
- 22 November - The Metric system is introduced in Sweden
- 6 December - The Phonograph is introduced in Sweden
- - First issue of Bohusläningen
- - The Stockholm University is founded.
- - The Eldkvarn fire.
- - The Svenska Federationen is founded to stop the regulation of prostitutes. It also questioned the sexual double standards that justified it, which also inspired the public sexual morality debate referred to as Sedlighetsdebatten.
- - The Swedish colony of Saint Barthélemy is bought by the French.

== Births ==
- 4 January – Rosa Grünberg, actress and singer (died 1960)
- 25 January – Ernst Alexanderson, television pioneer (died 1975)
- 17 February – Celina Runeborg, painter (died 1977)
- 27 May – Anna Cervin, artist (died 1972)
- 25 June – Erik Viktor Tryggelin, painter (died 1962)
- 23 September – Carl Kylberg, modernist painter (died 1952)

== Deaths ==
- 8 February – Elias Magnus Fries, mycologist and botanist (born 1794)
- 8 October - Caroline Ridderstolpe, composer (born 1793)
- 30 November – Dorothea Dunckel, playwright (born 1799)
