= 1805 in Sweden =

- Years in Sweden: 1802 1803 1804 1805 1806 1807 1808
- Centuries: 18th century · 19th century · 20th century
- Decades: 1770s 1780s 1790s 1800s 1810s 1820s 1830s
- Years: 1802 1803 1804 1805 1806 1807 1808

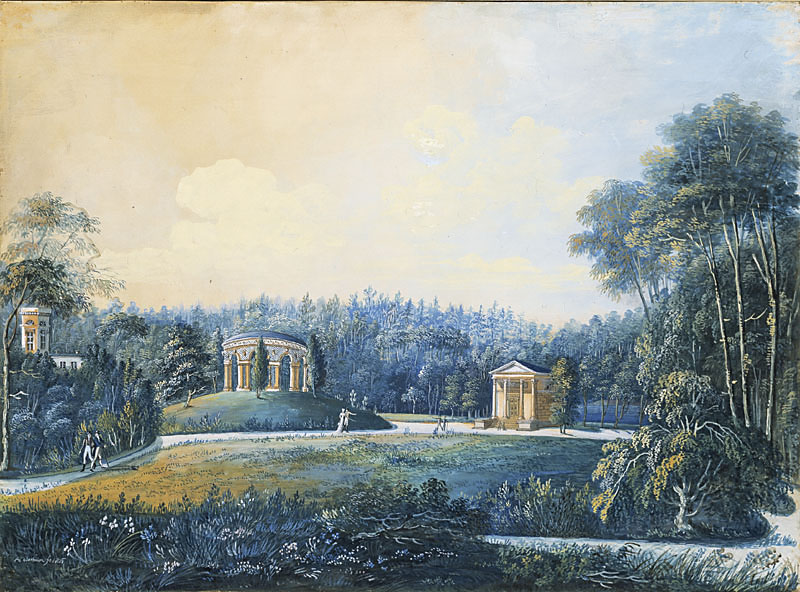
Hagaparken 1805

Events from the year 1805 in Sweden

== Incumbents ==
- Monarch – Gustav IV Adolf

== Events ==
- 31 October - Franco-Swedish War
- Dagens stunder by Johan Gabriel Oxenstierna
- Johan Olof Wallin awarded the big price of the Swedish Academy.

== Births ==
- 22 February - Princess Amalia of Sweden (died 1853)
- 13 December - Pierre Deland, actor (died 1862)

== Deaths ==
- 25 May - Anna Maria Rückerschöld, author (born 1725)
- 23 December - Pehr Osbeck, explorer and naturalist (born 1723)
- Anna Hammar-Rosén, newspaper editor (born 1735)
