= 1803 in Sweden =

- Years in Sweden: 1800 1801 1802 1803 1804 1805 1806
- Centuries: 18th century · 19th century · 20th century
- Decades: 1770s 1780s 1790s 1800s 1810s 1820s 1830s
- Years: 1800 1801 1802 1803 1804 1805 1806

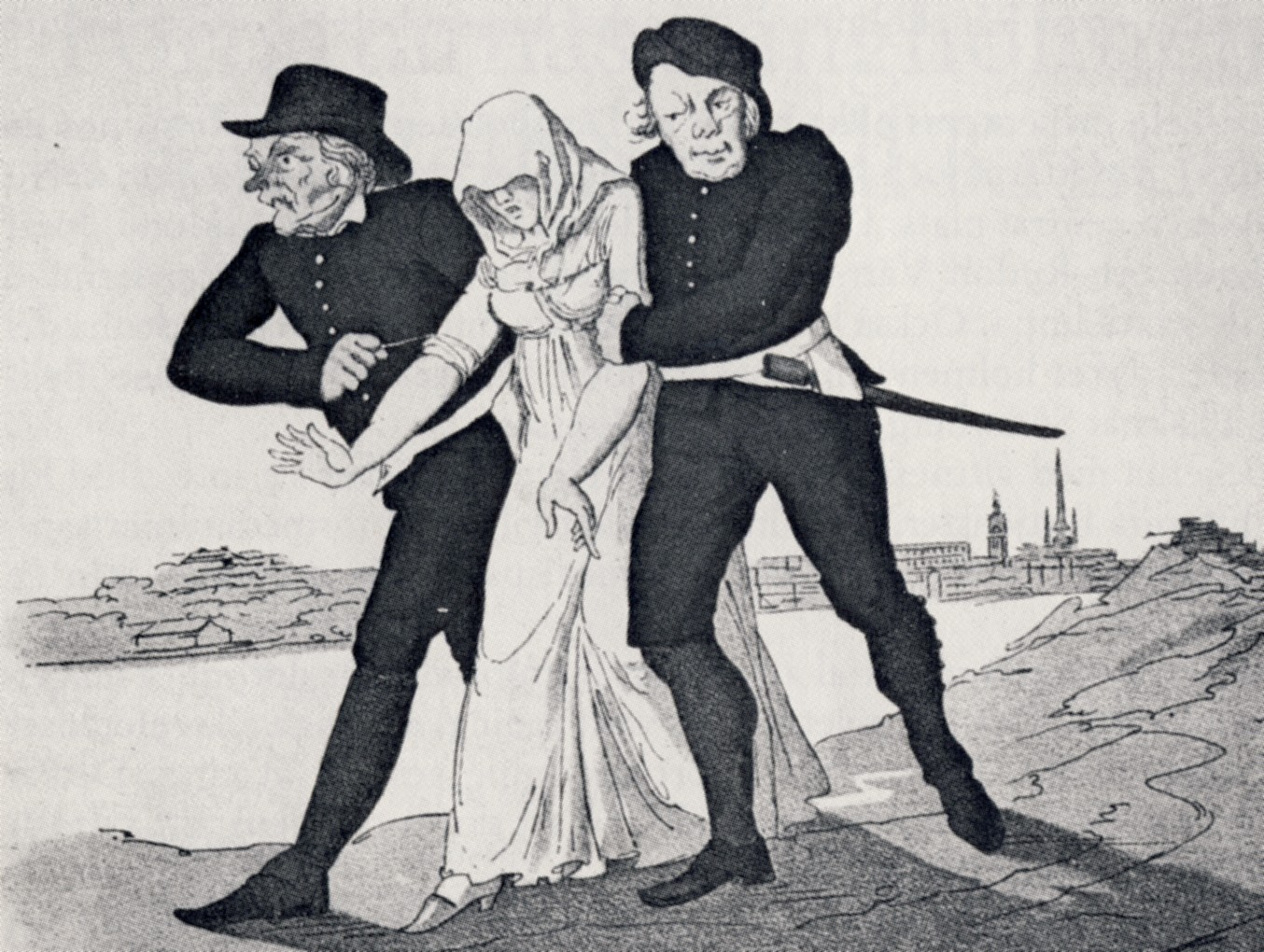
A prostitute taken to the Långholmens spinnhus in the 1800s.

Events from the year 1803 in Sweden

== Incumbents ==
- Monarch – Gustav IV Adolf

== Events ==
- - The land reform Enskiftet is enforced in all Scania.
- - The Yellow Rose (society) is exposed and banned by the monarch, leading to the end of all secret masonic lodges at the royal court.

== Births ==
- 8 June - Amalia Assur, first female dentist (died 1889)
- 16 May – Amelie von Strussenfelt, writer (died 1847)
- 25 November – Sofia Ahlbom, artist (died 1868)
- 26 November – Wilhelmina Stålberg, writer (died 1886)
- – Evelina Stading, painter (died 1872)
- – Isak Albert Berg, singer, composer (died 1886)

== Deaths ==
- 1 February – Anders Chydenius, leading classical liberal of Nordic history (born 1729)
- 12 December - Prince Frederick Adolf of Sweden, prince (born 1750)
- 27 August - Peter Gustaf Tengmalm, naturalist (born 1754)
- - Erika Liebman, poet and scholar (born 1738)
