= 1952 in Sweden =

- Decades: 1930s; 1940s; 1950s; 1960s; 1970s
- See also: Other events of 1952; Timeline of Swedish history

Events from the year 1952 in Sweden

== Incumbents ==
- Monarch – Gustaf VI Adolf
- Prime Minister – Tage Erlander

== Events ==
- June – The Catalina affair
- 21 September – Swedish general election
- 25 October – The Swedish Basketball Federation is founded out of the Swedish Handball Federation's basketball section.
- unknown date – The paratrooper training school Fallskärmsjägarna (FJS) is established.

== Popular culture ==
=== Film ===
- 12 August – The Firebird released

== Births ==
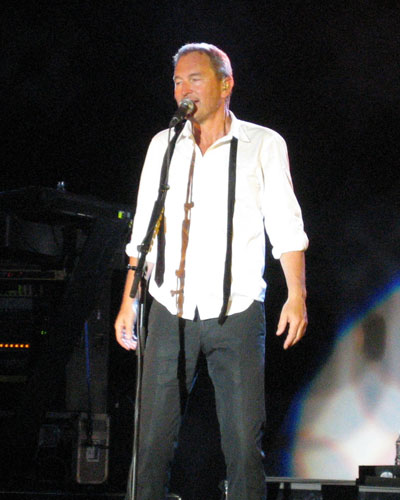
Tomas Ledin

- 23 February – Sören Åkeby, football player
- 25 February – Tomas Ledin, singer and songwriter
- 21 March – Håkan Lindström, sailor.
- 7 May – Stanley Dickens, racing driver
- 12 May – Christer Garpenborg, athlete.
- 29 May – Carl-Henric Svanberg, businessman
- 14 June – Suzanne Reuter, actress
- 15 July – Christian Palme, communications expert, journalist and writer
- 10 August – Ulf Weinstock, ice hockey player.
- 10 September – Gustav Levin, actor

== Deaths ==
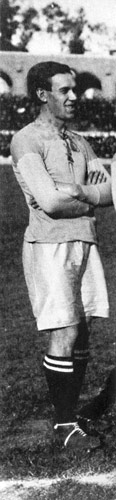
Konrad Törnqvist

- 12 July – Konrad Törnqvist, football player (born 1888).
- 2 September – Hans von Rosen, horse rider (born 1888)
- 24 December – Anton Johanson, football player and manager (born 1877)
- Anna von Zweigbergk, reporter (born 1865)
