= 1873 in Sweden =

- Decades: 1850s; 1860s; 1870s; 1880s; 1890s
- See also: Other events of 1873; Timeline of Swedish history

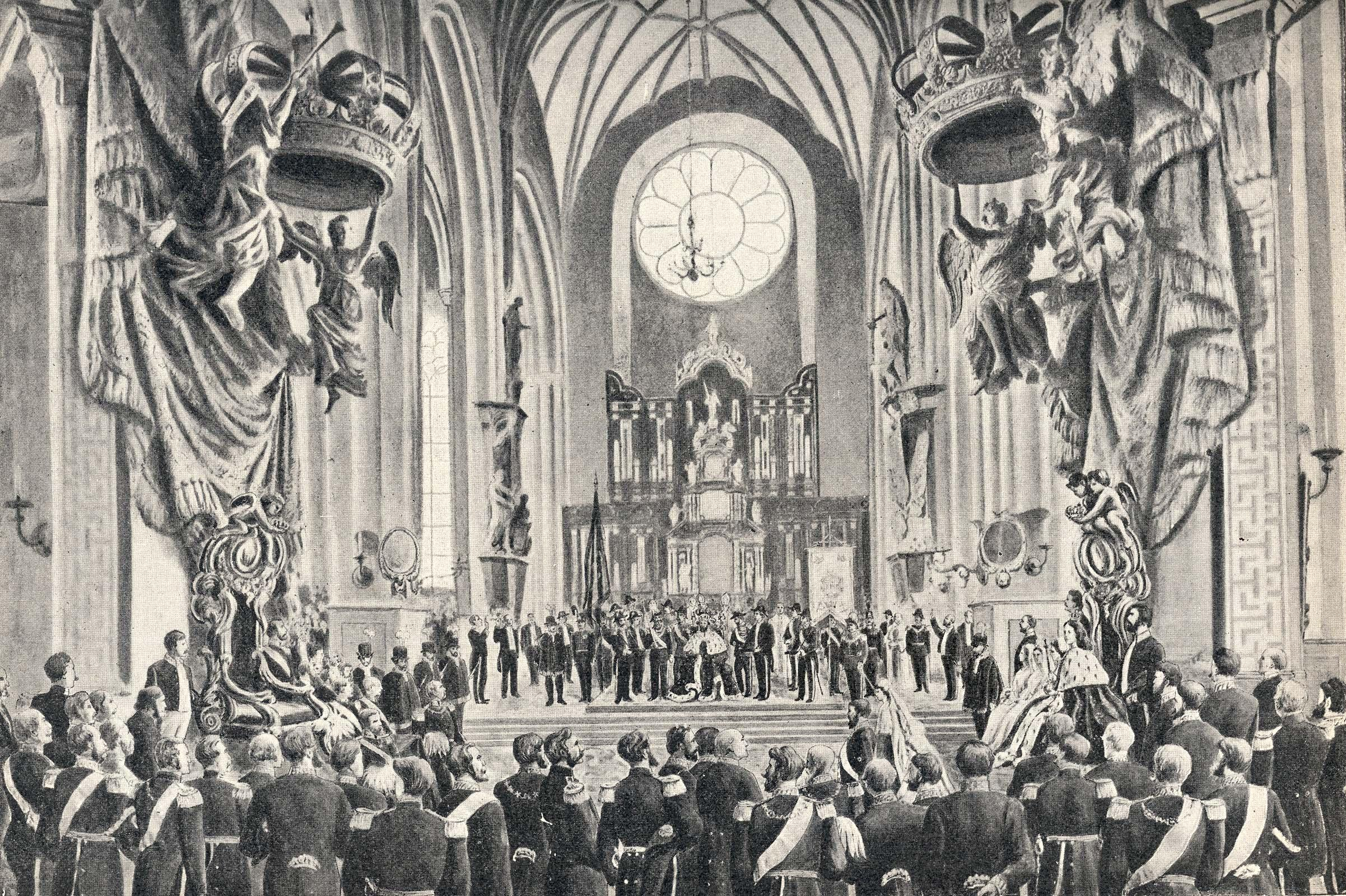
Oscar II & Sofia's coronation, 1873

Events from the year 1873 in Sweden

== Incumbents ==
- Monarch – Oscar II

== Events ==
- Foundation of the first women's rights organization in Sweden, the Married Woman's Property Rights Association.
- 5 May - The Scandinavian Monetary Union is founded. Swedish krona becomes the currency, replacing the riksdaler, in the effort to create a central, trans-national currency in Scandinavia.
- The Dämman lighthouse is constructed.

== Births ==
- 10 April – Ingeborg Rönnblad, actress (died 1915)
- 3 June – Anna Lisa Andersson, reporter (died 1958)
- 13 June – Karin Swanström, actress, producer and director (died 1942)
- 15 September – Ellen Hagen, suffragette, women's rights activist and politician (died 1967)

== Deaths ==
- 4 March – Prince August, Duke of Dalarna, royalty (born 1831)
- 27 March – Fanny Westerdahl, stage actress (born 1817)
- 31 March – Maria Magdalena Mathsdotter, Sami (died 1835)
- 20 May – Fredrica Ehrenborg, writer (born 1794)
- 16 January – Ulrika von Strussenfelt, writer (born 1801)
