= 1877 in Sweden =

- Decades: 1850s; 1860s; 1870s; 1880s; 1890s
- See also: Other events of 1877; Timeline of Swedish history

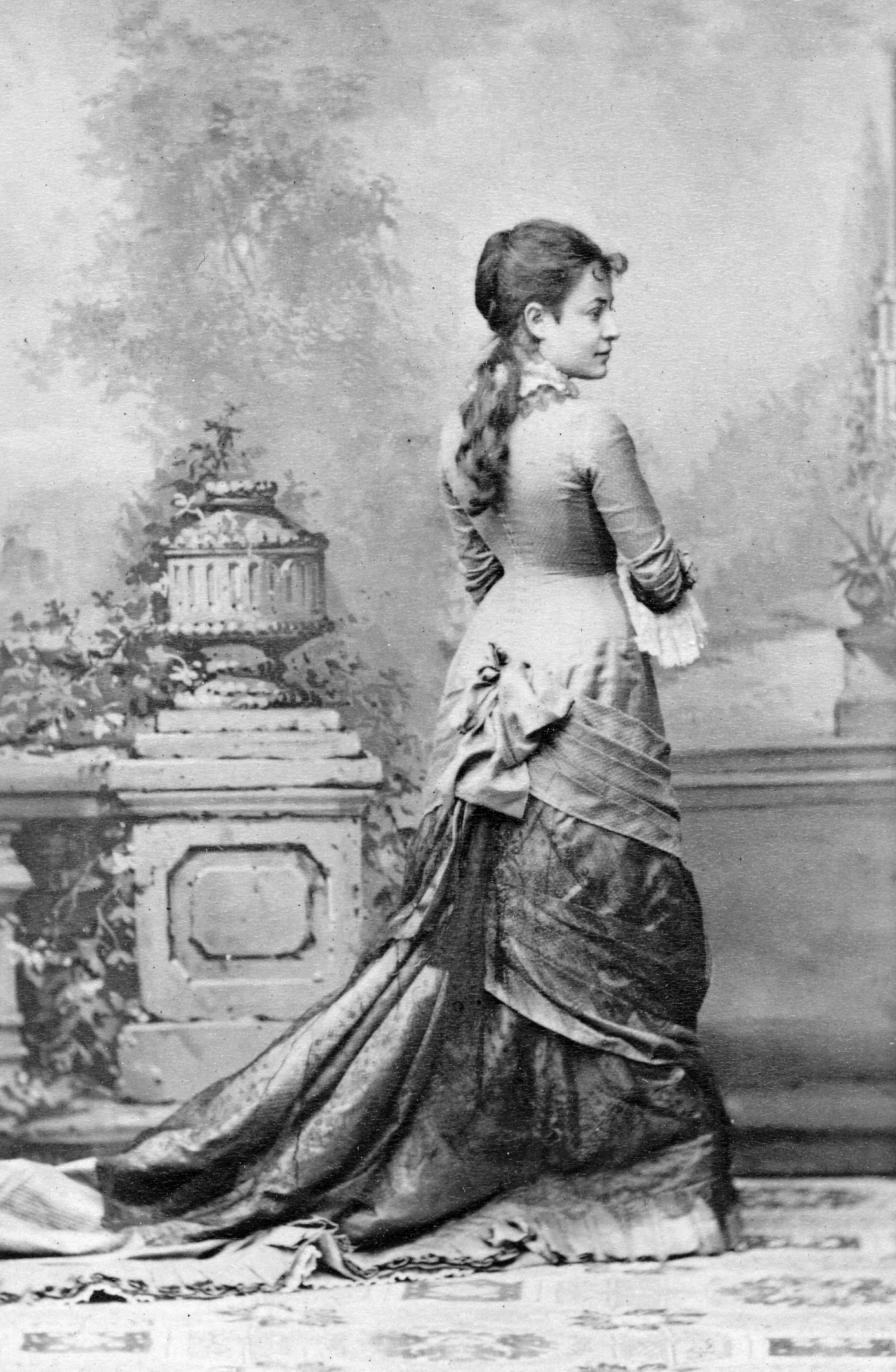
Ida Brander

Events from the year 1877 in Sweden

== Incumbents ==
- Monarch – Oscar II
- Prime Minister – Louis Gerhard De Geer

== Events ==
- 2 March - The Helga de la Brache affair is completed by a conviction of the de la Brache after her exposure.
- - Televerket (Sweden) introduces the telephone to the Swedish government.
- - Foundation of the Söderbloms Gjuteri & Mekaniska Verkstad
- - Inauguration of the Tisselskog Church
- - First issue of the Östersunds-Posten
- - Swedish Society for Anthropology and Geography is founded.

== Births ==
- 11 January – Oskar Andersson, cartoonist (died 1906)
- 5 November - Märtha Leth, pharmacist (died 1954)

== Deaths ==
- 5 February – C. V. A. Strandberg, poet (born 1818)
- 28 April - Charlotte Pousette, stage actress (born 1832)
- 3 May – Mathilda Berwald, concert singer (born 1798)
- 19 May – Charlotta Djurström, actress and theater manager (born 1807)
- - Edvard Stjernström, stage actor and theater director (born 1816)
