= 1881 in Sweden =

- Decades: 1860s; 1870s; 1880s; 1890s; 1900s
- See also: Other events of 1881; Timeline of Swedish history

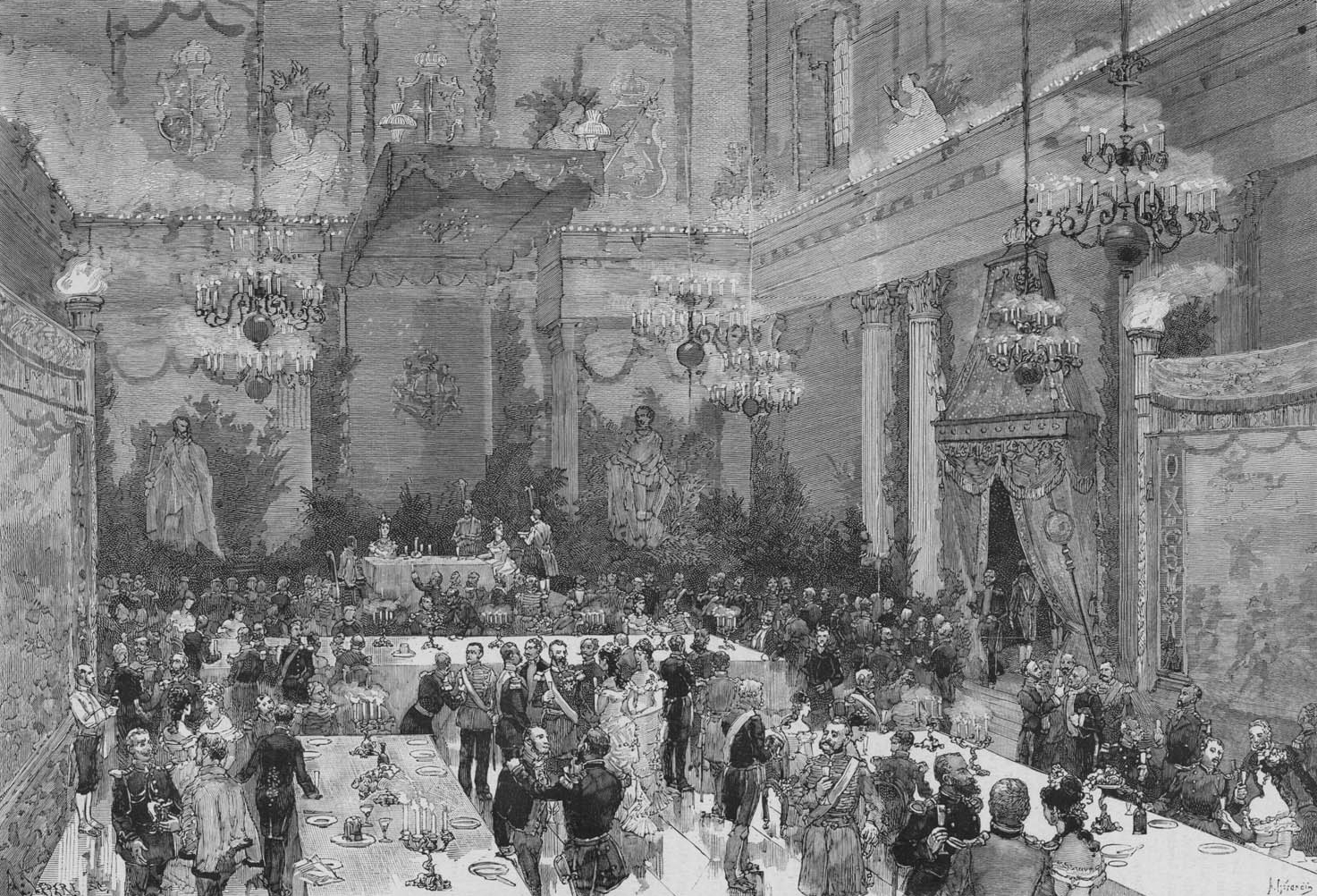

Events from the year 1881 in Sweden

== Incumbents ==
- Monarch – Oscar II
- Prime Minister – Arvid Posse

== Events ==
- - Åre railway station opened
- - Malexander Church

== Births ==
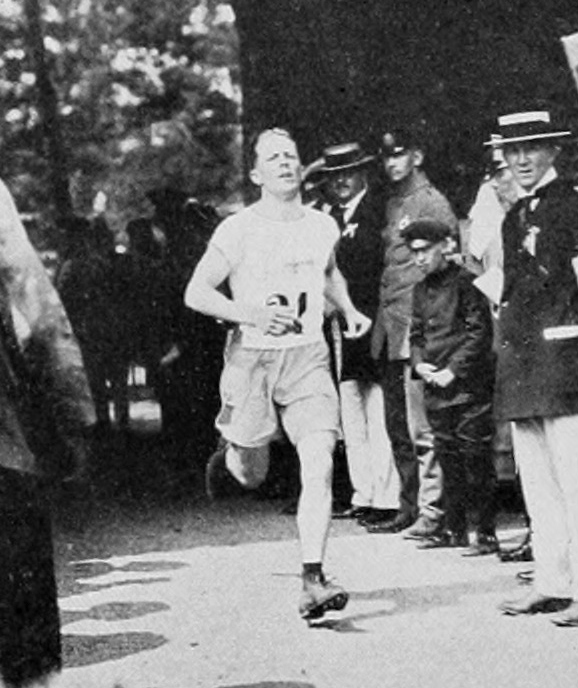
Gösta Åsbrink.

- 26 May – Sten Dehlgren, military officer and newspaper editor (d. 1947).
- 8 July – Ruth Gustafson, social democrat, politician, social reformer (died 1960)
- 9 July – Arvid Andersson, tug-of-war competitor (died 1956).
- 29 August – Johan Hübner von Holst, sport shooter (died 1945).
- 5 October – Florence Stephens, heiress and landowner (died 1979)
- 18 November – Gösta Åsbrink, gymnast (died 1966).

== Deaths ==
- 26 march - Lovisa Åhrberg, surgeon and doctor (born 1801)
- - Sophia Magdalena Gardelius, damask weaver (born 1804)
