= 1953 in Sweden =

- Decades: 1930s; 1940s; 1950s; 1960s; 1970s
- See also: Other events of 1953; Timeline of Swedish history

Events from the year 1953 in Sweden

== Incumbents ==
- Monarch – Gustaf VI Adolf
- Prime Minister – Tage Erlander

== Events ==
- 8 September – The first motorway in Sweden is inaugurated, and runs between Malmö and Lund.

== Births ==
- 27 January – Göran Flodström, fencer.
- 18 April – Bernt Johansson, cyclist.
- 31 October – Blåvitt Elofsson, politician

=== Exact date unknown ===
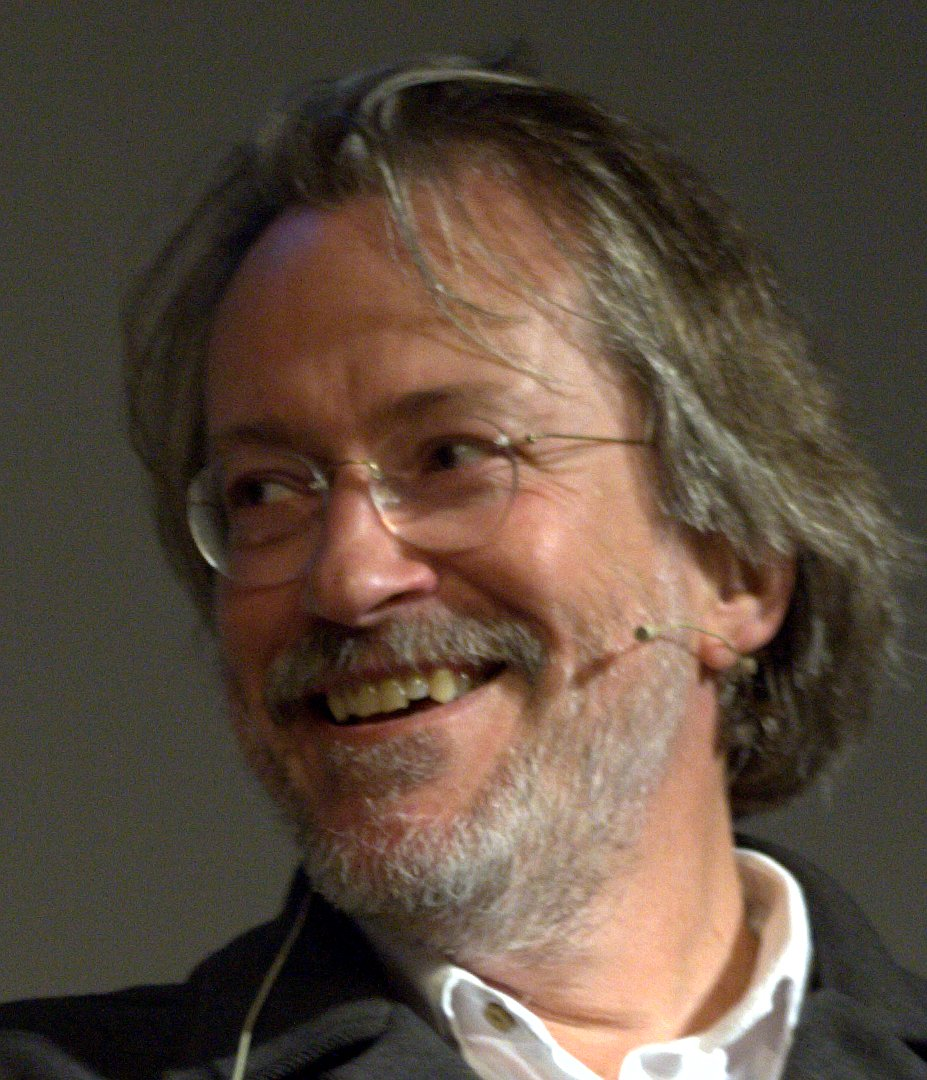
Niklas Rådström

- Eva Runefelt, novelist.
- Niklas Rådström, poet.

== Deaths ==
- 3 April – Algot Lönn, cyclist (born 1887).
- 22 May – Hanna Grönvall, politician and trade union worker (born 1879)
- 5 August – Sven Johansson, canoer (born 1912).
- 7 August – Anna Johansson-Visborg, politician (Social Democrat), trade unionist and women's right activist (born 1876)
- Amanda Horney, politician (Social Democrat), trade unionist and women's right activist (born 1857)
