= Hellstrand =

Hellstrand is a surname. Notable people with the surname include:

- Eva Hellstrand (born 1957), Swedish politician
- Staffan Hellstrand (born 1956), Swedish singer, rock musician, songwriter, and record producer
