= 1958 in Swedish television =

This is a list of Swedish television related events from 1958.

== Events ==
- 12 March - Sweden enters the Eurovision Song Contest for the first time with "Lilla stjärna" performed by Alice Babs.

== See also ==
- 1958 in Sweden
