= 1951 in Sweden =

- Decades: 1930s; 1940s; 1950s; 1960s; 1970s
- See also: Other events of 1951; Timeline of Swedish history

Events from the year 1951 in Sweden

== Incumbents ==
- Monarch – Gustaf VI Adolf
- Prime Minister – Tage Erlander

== Events ==
- 22 January – 11 people die when a rail bus and a train collide in Kinstaby, Sweden.
- 9 May – In order to reduce purchasing power and counteract the rapid inflation in Sweden, the Swedish parliament decides on a series of new taxes.
- 2 June – The first Colorado beetle is discovered in Sweden.

== Births ==
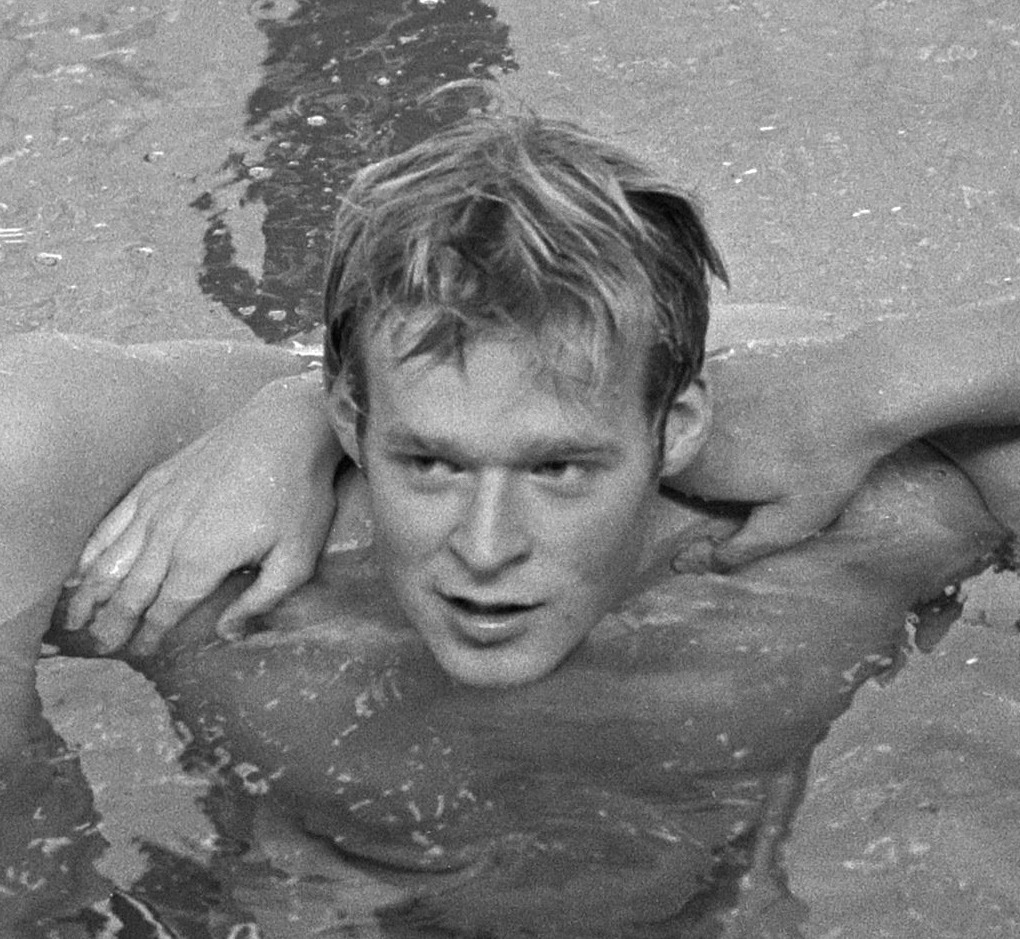
Gunnar Larsson in 1970

- 23 February – Ulla Skoog, actress and comedian
- 17 April – Börje Salming, ice hockey player (died 2022).
- 12 May – Gunnar Larsson, swimmer.
- 14 May – Anders Paulrud, writer (died 2008).
- 13 June – Stellan Skarsgård, actor.
- 27 June – Ulf Andersson, chess player
- 2 August – Per Westerberg, politician
- 2 August – Freddie Wadling (died 2016).
- 4 September – Marita Ulvskog, politician and former MEP
- 17 October – Roger Pontare, musician
- 19 December – Ulf Olsson, convicted murderer (died 2010).

== Deaths ==
- 12 January – Gustaf Boivie, sport shooter (born 1864).
- 26 October – Herbert Lindström, tug-of-war competitor, Olympic champion from 2012 (born 1886).
- 25 December – Filip Ericsson, sailor (born 1882).
