= 1956 in Sweden =

- Decades: 1930s; 1940s; 1950s; 1960s; 1970s
- See also: Other events of 1956; Timeline of Swedish history

Events from the year 1956 in Sweden

== Incumbents ==
- Monarch – Gustaf VI Adolf
- Prime Minister – Tage Erlander

== Events ==
- 16 September – Swedish general election
- The Husaby Affair around Florence Stephens.
- The disappearance of Gunnel Gummeson.

== Popular culture ==
=== Sport ===
- Guldpucken established
- 11-17 June - The country stages the Equestrian events in the 1956 Summer Olympics because of problems with quarantine laws affecting the host city of Melbourne

=== Theatre ===
- The Eugene O'Neill Award established

=== Film ===
- 11 June – Seventh Heaven released
- 10 September – The Staffan Stolle Story released

== Births ==
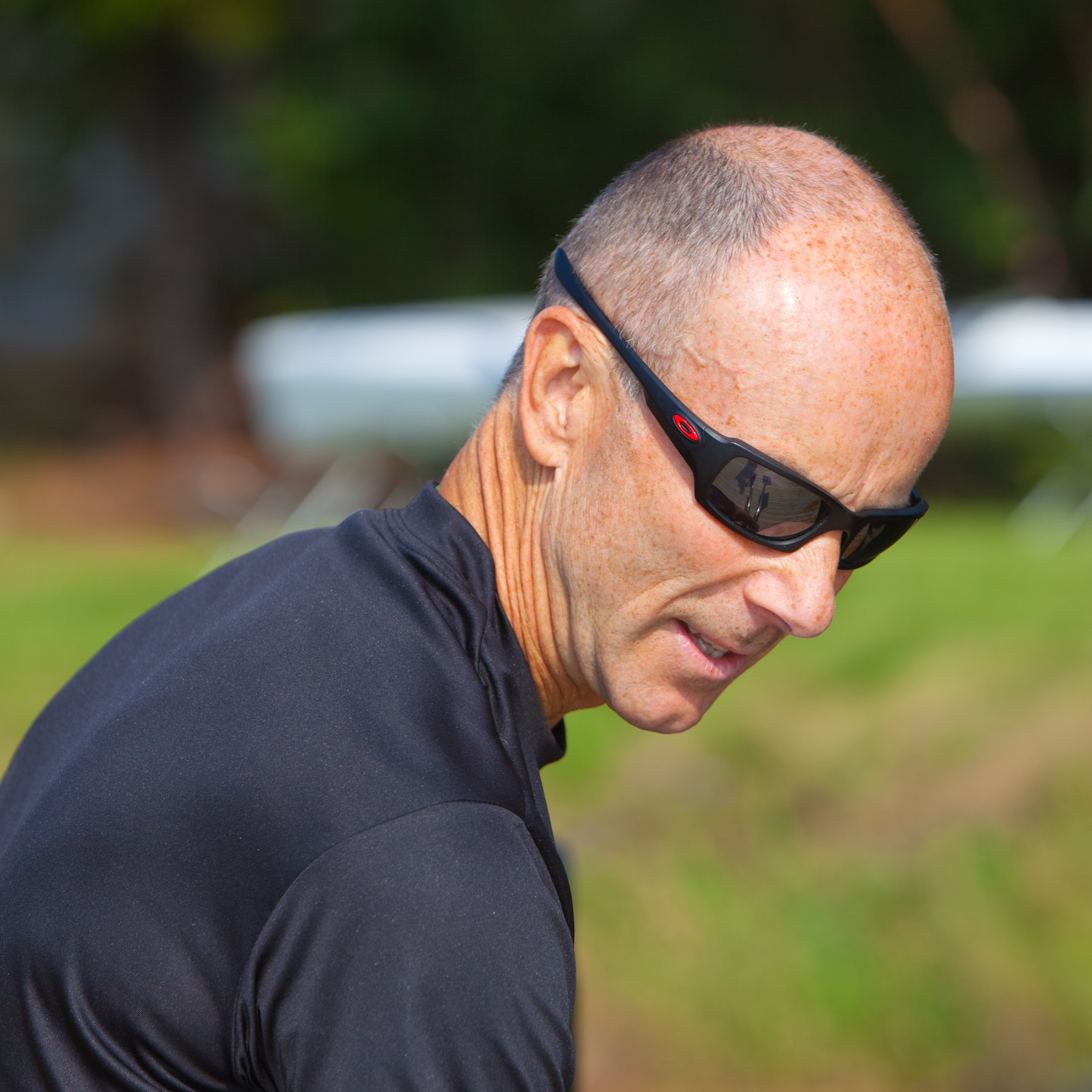
Ingemar Stenmark won more international races than any other alpine skier in history, with a total of 86 wins until March 2023 when Shiffrin won her 87th World Cup race.

- 18 March – Ingemar Stenmark, alpine skier.
- 2 May – Kenneth Johansson, politician
- 13 May – Staffan Hellstrand, rock musician, songwriter and record producer
- 23 May – Tomas Norström, actor and film director.
- 6 June – Björn Borg, tennis player
- 24 August – Clas Lindberg, film director and screenwriter
- 2 September – Marcus Wallenberg, banker and industrialist
- 8 November – Peter Lindmark, ice hockey player.
- 5 December – Peter Dalle, actor and comedian
- Unknown date – Agneta Nilsson, politician

== Deaths ==
- 10 March – Åke Fjästad, football player (born 1887).
- 21 March – Per Kaufeldt, football player (born 1902)
- 7 April – Sven Linderot, politician (born 1890)
- Elin Engström, politician (Social Democrat), trade unionist and women's right activist (born 1860)
- 15 April – Leonard Peterson, gymnast (born 1857)
