= Olle Hedberg =

Swedish author (1899–1974)

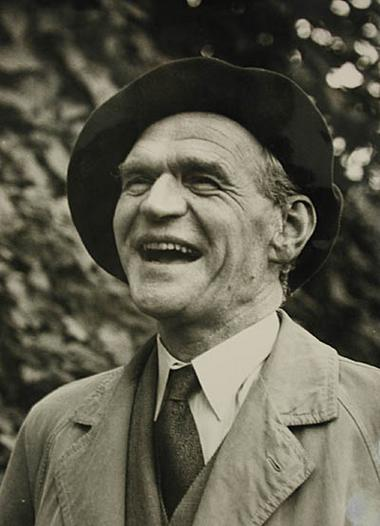
- Olle Hedberg in 1957.
- Born: Carl Olof Hedberg; 31 May 1899; Norrköping, Sweden
- Died: 20 September 1974 (aged 75); Verveln, Sweden
- Spouse: Ruth Hedberg
- Writing career
- Language: Swedish
- Notable works: Iris och löjtnantshjärta Ut med blondinerna! Bekänna färg

Carl Olof "Olle" Hedberg (31 May 1899 in Norrköping, Sweden – 20 September 1974 in Verveln, Östergötland, Sweden) was a Swedish author.

Hedberg is known as a probing satirist of the middle class and conventional world in general. His first novel, Rymmare och fasttagare (Prisoner's base), was published in 1930, and from then on would write a novel every year for the next several decades. His works of the 1940s entail a search for religious and moral values. Bekänna färg (Show one’s hand), published in 1947, is considered to be one of his most important novels from this period.

His works do not aspire to a philosophical greatness. Rather he himself is more of a realist and a disenchanted moralist. He was a member of the Swedish Academy from 1957.

Hedberg committed suicide 1974, a few weeks after his daughter Birgitta succumbed to a sudden illness.

== Selected bibliography ==
- Prisoner's Base (Swedish: Rymmare och fasttagare, 1930) (English translation 1932)
- Iris och löjtnantshjärta (1934)
- Ut med blondinerna! (1939)
- Stopp! Tänk på något annat (1939)
- Bekänna färg (1947)
- Animals in Cages (Swedish: Djur i bur, 1959) (English translation 1962)

== Notes ==
Cultural offices
Preceded by Sten Selander	Swedish Academy, Seat No 6; 1957–74	Succeeded by Per Olof Sundman
