= 1958 in Sweden =

- Decades: 1930s; 1940s; 1950s; 1960s; 1970s
- See also: Other events of 1958; Timeline of Swedish history

Events from the year 1958 in Sweden.

== Incumbents ==
- Monarch – Gustaf VI Adolf
- Prime Minister – Tage Erlander

== Events ==
- 8-29 June – The 1958 FIFA World Cup is played in Sweden. Brazil defeats Sweden, 5–2, in the final game at Råsunda Stadium in Solna.
- 11 December – The first indoor ice hockey venue in Sweden, Rosenlundshallen in Jönköping, is inaugurated.

== Births ==
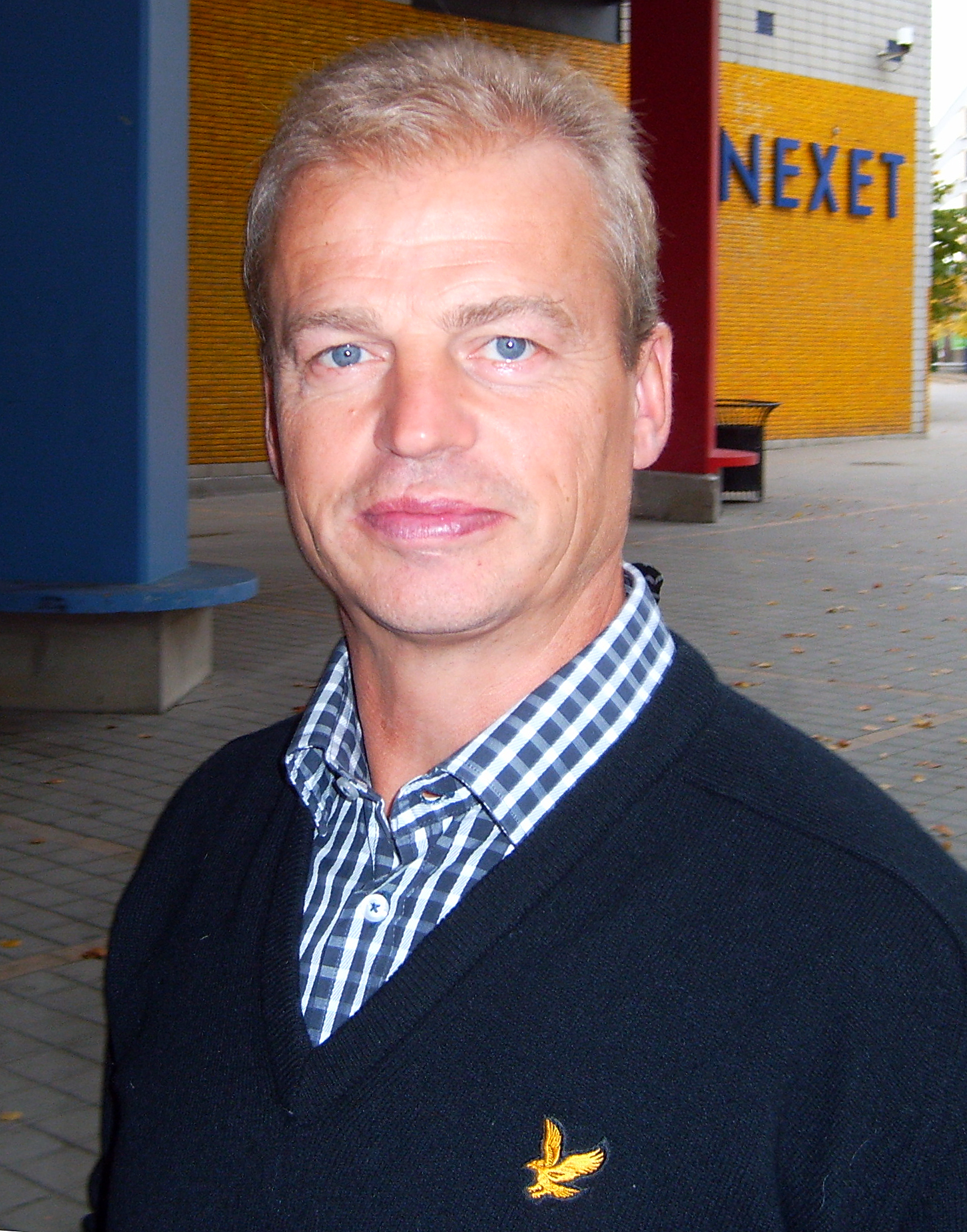
Bengt-Åke Gustafsson.

- 23 March – Bengt-Åke Gustafsson, ice hockey player and coach.
- 30 May – Marie Fredriksson, singer
- 16 August – Steve Sem-Sandberg, novelist.
- 14 February – Birgitta Lillpers, poet.

=== Full date missing ===
- Mats Nordberg, politician (died 2023).

== Deaths ==
- 11 September – Arvid Holmberg, gymnast (born 1886).
- 23 September – Elisabeth Tamm, politician
- 11 November – Helge Bäckander, gymnast (born 1891).
- Anna Lisa Andersson, reporter (born 1873)

== See also ==
- 1958 in Swedish television
