= 1804 in Sweden =

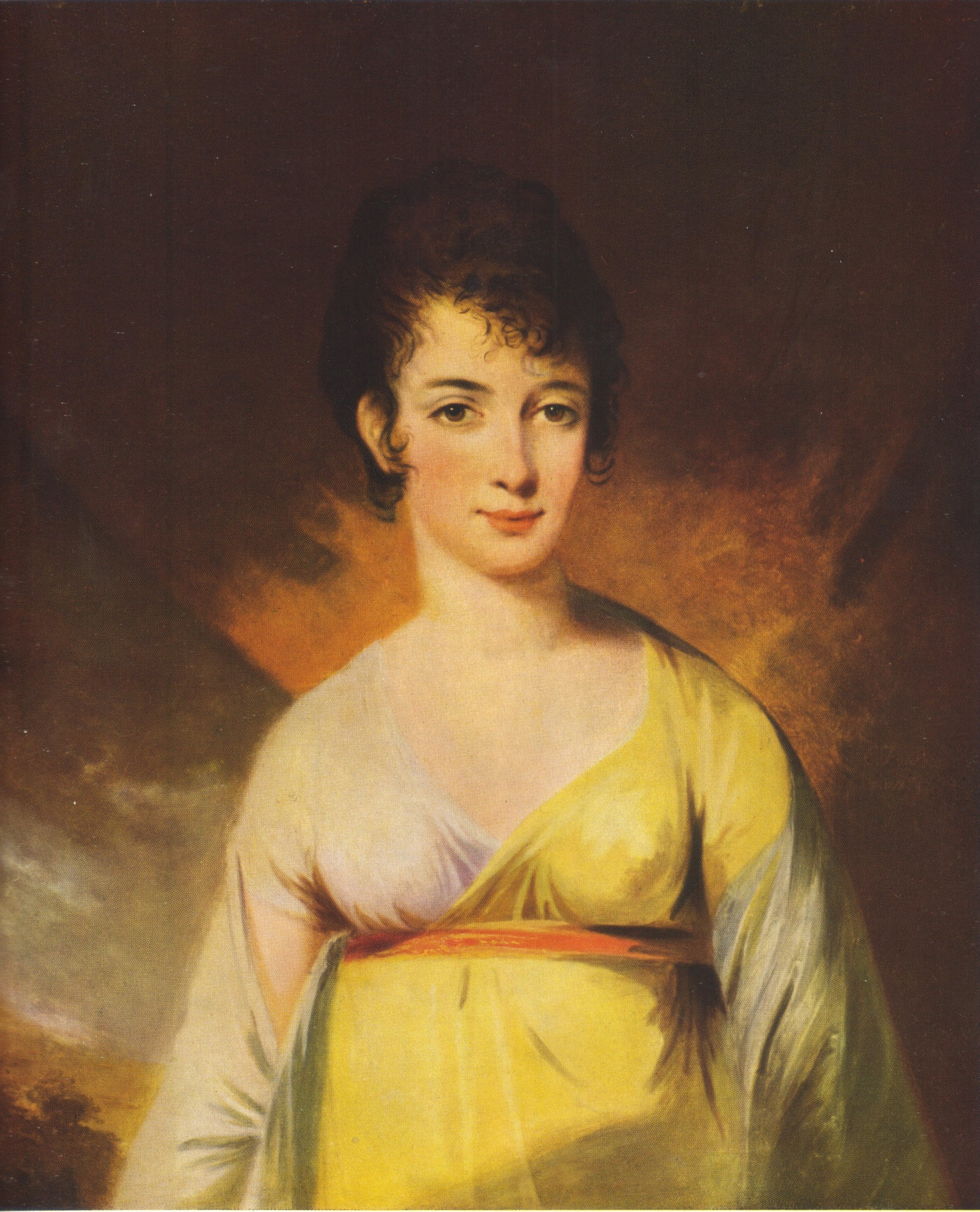
Martina von Schwerin 1804

Events from the year 1804 in Sweden

== Incumbents ==
- Monarch – Gustav IV Adolf

== Events ==
- - Jöns Jacob Berzelius discover cerium.
- - Sofia Lovisa Gråå appointed principal of the Royal Dramatic Training Academy.

== Births ==
- 28 January - Carl Johan Billmark, painter (died 1870)
- 8 May - Lapp-Nils, Sami musician (died 1870)
- 19 August - Christina Enbom, opera singer (died 1880)
- - Anna Johansdotter Norbäck, founder and leader of the religious movement Annaniterna (died 1879)
- - Sophia Magdalena Gardelius, damask weaver (died 1881)
- Petter Conrad Boman, composer and author.

== Deaths ==
- 4 April - Abraham de Broen, actor (born 1759)
- - Anna Brita Wendelius, member of the Royal Swedish Academy of Music and the Utile Dulci (born 1741)
- - Marguerite Morel, ballerina, actress and singer (born 1737)
- - Gustaf Björnram, mystic and spiritualist medium (born 1746)
- - Anna Maria Engsten
