= 1874 in Sweden =

- Decades: 1850s; 1860s; 1870s; 1880s; 1890s
- See also: Other events of 1874; Timeline of Swedish history

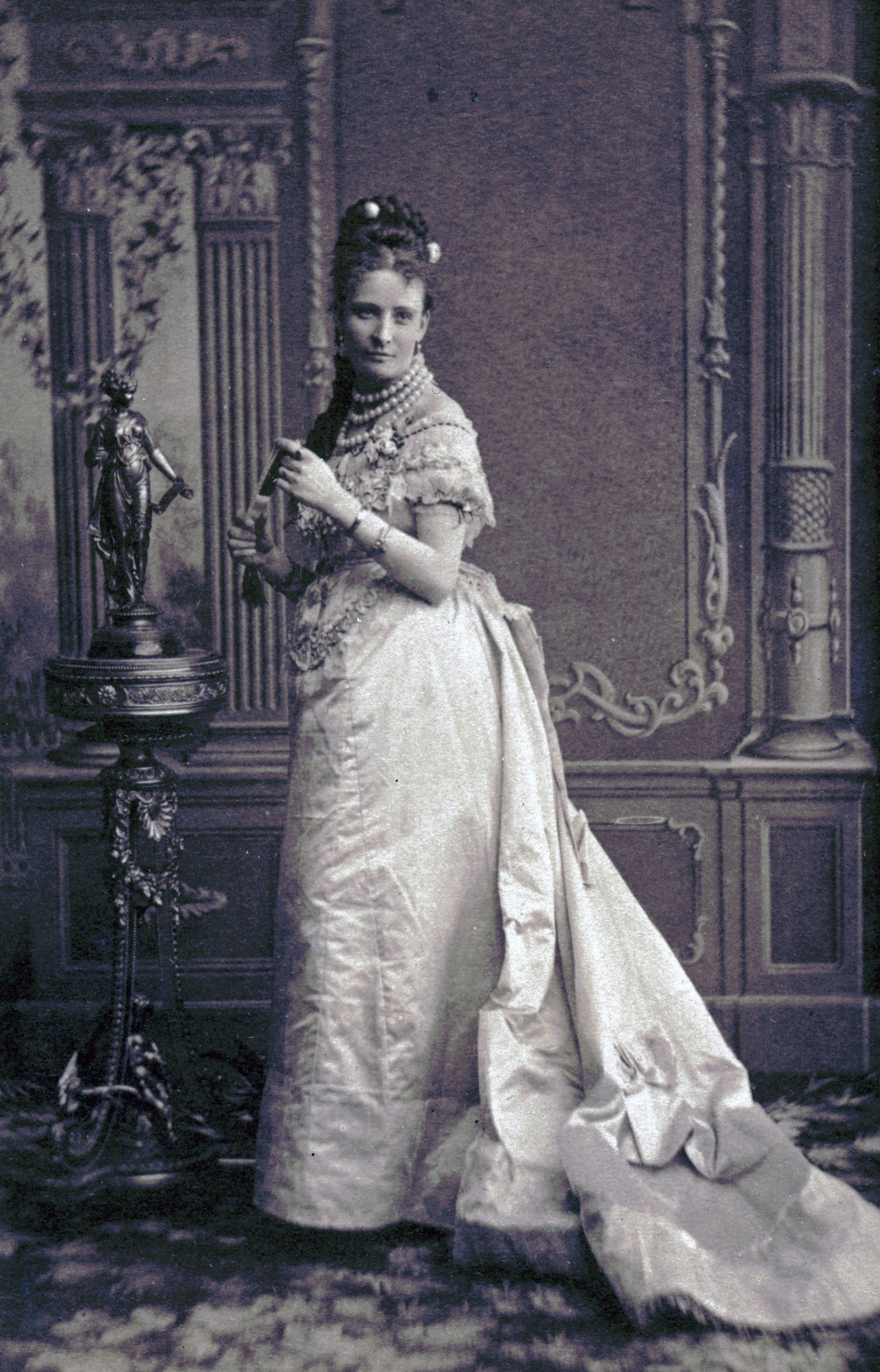
Clara Gardt

Events from the year 1874 in Sweden

== Incumbents ==
- Monarch – Oscar II

== Events ==
- 27 April – Hildegard Björck becomes the first Swedish woman to complete an academic degree.
- In accordance with the recommendations of the progressive Girls' School Committee of 1866, girls' schools which meet the demands are given governmental support.
- In accordance with the Girls' School Committee of 1866, Wallinska skolan becomes the first girls' school permitted to administer the studentexamen for its students.
- Married women granted control over their own income.
- The inauguration of the Grand Hôtel (Stockholm).
- Foundation of the Långholmen Prison
- Maria Stenkula opens the Malmö högre läroverk för flickor
- Establishment of the Prästerskapets Änke- och Pupillkassa, a retirement fund for widows of priests.
- Foundation of the Swedish Publicists' Association.
- Foundation of the Friends of Handicraft.

== Births ==
- 11 February – Elsa Beskow, author and illustrator (died 1954)
- 13 February – Elsa Lindberg, Swedish writer and princess of Persia (died 1944)
- 5 July – Anna Lang, harpist (died 1920)

== Deaths ==
- 11 February – Zelma Hedin, stage actress (born 1827)
- 23 March – Gertrud Ahlgren, cunning woman and natural healer (born 1782)
- 21 June – Anders Jonas Ångström physicist and one of the founders of the science of spectroscopy (born 1814)
- 6 November – Anders Selinder, ballet master (born 1806)
