= Anna Sissak-Bardizbanian =

Swedish journalist

Anna Sissak-Bardizbanian (née Hallman; 1876–1919), also known as Anna Hallman-Knös and Anna Sissak, was a Swedish journalist and author. She was one of the first female reporters in Sweden and was long portrayed as such in the Swedish press. She was employed at Svenska Dagbladet in 1897–1899 and freelanced for Dagens Nyheter from 1896 onward, becoming a well known figure in the contemporary Swedish press. She used the signatures Cendrillon and Catherine.

== Early life ==
She was born to the sea captain S. Hallman in Trollhättan. After the death of her father, she and her siblings were placed by her mother as foster siblings with relatives for economic reasons, and she was brought up as foster child by her paternal aunt and her spouse doctor G. B. Knös in Vadstena.

After having finished her studies, she visited Paris in 1894. There, she shared a room with an Armenian woman and became attached to a group of Armenian radicals who called her La Blonde vierge. She claimed that the group was planning to assassinate the Ottoman sultan, and that they tried to convince her to perform the assassination by having her placed as an agent in the Imperial Harem, but that she refused and returned to Sweden. In 1898, however, she visited Manchester where she was reunited with the Armenian poet and freedom fighter Stefan Sissak-Bardizbanian, whom she married. The marriage lasted for three months, after which they separated. She herself stated that she married merely because she was pregnant: she placed her son Staffan as foster son with her sister.

== Media career ==
Anna Sissak-Bardizbanian is confirmed as journalist from at least 1896, when she was a freelance at Dagens Nyheter. Between 1897 and 1899, she had a steady employment as a reporter in the Svenska Dagbladet. She was often referred to as the first female reporter in the Stockholm press. A contemporary article in Illustreradt Hvad Nytt from 1898 write: "The Stockholm press was given its first female reporter last year when madame Anna Sissak made her entrance in the Svenska Dagbladet [...]. She writes notices and performs interviews with fearlessness and talent. Any newspaper would find a co-worker as her a sharp one. With her sympathetic female nature and personal freshness she is well received wherever she goes – which is not always the case with her male colleagues. But they are not jealous because the find in her a good and able comrade."

Sissak-Bardizbanian was not literary the first female reporter in the Stockholm press: between 1884 and 1896, six of the seven biggest newspapers in the capital of Stockholm employed women co-workers, and at least two were employed at Svenska Dagbladet before her – but she was certainly a member of the pioneer generation of women reporters in Stockholm and very possibly the first well known female reporter there. In 1898, she became a member of the Publicistklubben, which was still uncommon for a woman. Her employment at Svenska Dagbladet was a short one, but this was common for most reporters in the Swedish press at this time regardless of sex or success.

== Later life ==
She continued as a freelance reporter the following years, but her life is somewhat unclear. She had a daughter with a millionaire in Gothenburg, who wished to marry her and unsuccessfully tried to trace her absent husband so that she could have a divorce, but never managed to find him, and adopted their daughter instead. She eventually moved to Paris, where she wrote freelance articles for Dagens Nyheter and was employed at some point at the Sainte-Geneviève Library: she socialized in theosophical circles and was occasionally given money from Verner von Heidenstam and Ellen Key.

According to her relative Börje Knös, "she was very beautiful and shined with life and health and opposition to the suffocating Oscarian atmosphere here at that time", and that she lived "en entirely Bohemian life style" in Paris. She likely died of tuberculosis in Lugano in 1919.

Her colleague and personal friend, the reporter Nils Lundström, described her in Svenska Dagbladet in 1934:

I have what I believe to be the first female reporter of our country in very fond memory as splendid and good comrade. In a terrific way she solved her not always easy task to perform her job as alone woman among exclusively male comrades. The public was also often enough somewhat critical toward a female journalist in those days which did not contribute to make that task easier. The time was not quite ready for a girl with boy cut hair who smoked cigarettes in public and frequented restaurants alone or joined her male comrades there. The bohemian was in her blood even though she came from an old family with much stability. Her education placed her in Paris for considerable periods. She supported herself there by the work of her own hands. When she earned some as a washer woman she returned to her status as a studying Swedish lady as long as the money would last. And then it was time for the washing again. Illness broke an unusually living life after a few years.

== Legacy ==
Anna Sissak-Bardizbanian was the model portrayed by the sketch En pige fra Vadstena by Jens Ferdinand Willumsen from 1903. She was the role model for "Madame Alrazian" in the novel Ljusets riddare by Johan Levart from 1904.
