= Söderbloms Gjuteri & Mekaniska Verkstad =

- Industry: Automotive
- Founded: 1877; 149 years ago in Eskilstuna, Sweden
- Key people: Knut Söderblom (CEO); Oskar Aspeling (head of sales); Bruno Büchner (head of design)

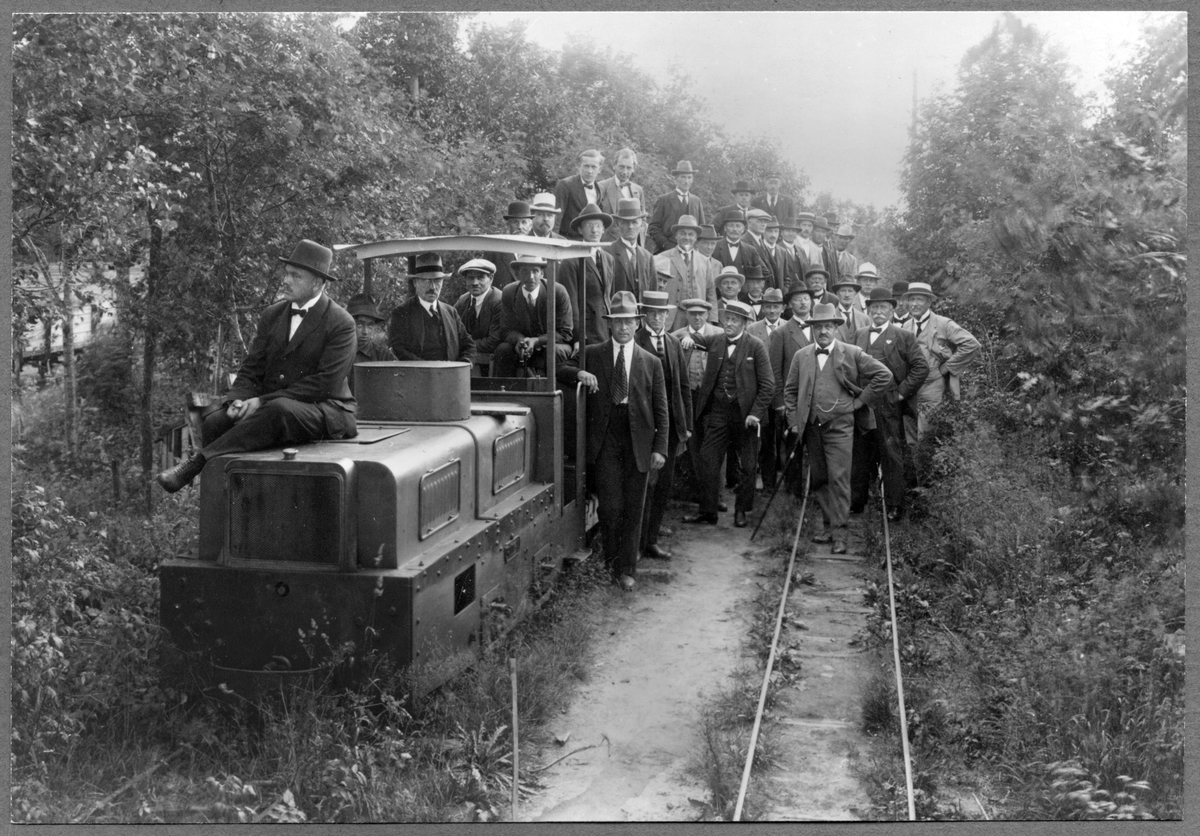

Söderbloms Gjuteri & Mekaniska Verkstad (Swedish for Söderblom's foundry and mechanical workshop) was founded in 1877 in Eskilstuna, Sweden.

The company started manufacturing engines in 1900 with a 1.5 HP air-cooled engine for motorcycles. In 1901, the company started manufacturing automobiles under the leadership of CEO Knut Söderblom and head of sales Oskar Aspeling. The company also hired a German engineer, Bruno Büchner, as head of design. The company primarily built trucks, but also produced two car models, a postal vehicle, and several draisines.
