= Ingeborg Rönnblad =

Swedish actress (1873–1915)

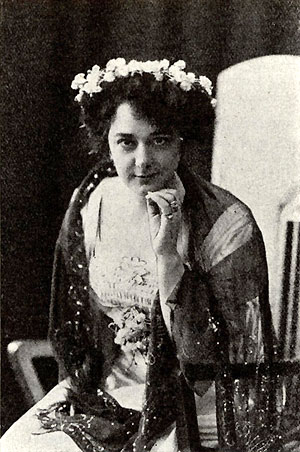
Ingeborg Rönnblad in 1900

Ingeborg Rönnblad (née Hansson; 10 April 1873 – 2 June 1915) was a Swedish actress.

== Biography ==
Ingeborg Hansson was born in Gränna to Julius Scheike Hansson and Jakobina Lund, who ran a theater company. She worked and was employed at Södra Teatern between 1888 and 1892, at Vasateatern between 1892 and 1894, at Fröberg Teatern between 1894 and 1895 and at Ranft Teatern.

She married the actor Hugo Rönnblad in 1891. Rönnblad was the aunt of actor Jules Sylvain.

Rönnblad died in Blidö. She is buried at Norrmalms begravningsplatsen in Stockholm.
