= 1957 Swedish pensions system referendum =

- 13 October 1957
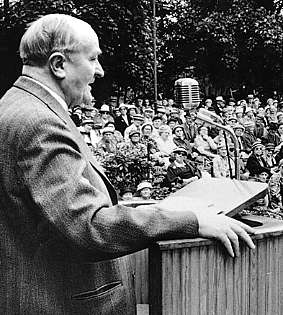
- Minister for Social Affairs Gustav Möller giving a speech on pensions at a senior citizens' meeting at Skansen, Stockholm on 12 July 1957.

Results
Choice	Votes	%
Option 1	1,624,131	47.68%
Option 2	530,576	15.58%
Option 3	1,251,477	36.74%
Valid votes	3,406,184	95.87%
Invalid or blank votes	146,681	4.13%
Total votes	3,552,865	100.00%
Registered voters/turnout	4,907,701	72.39%

A non-binding referendum on reforming the pensions system was held in Sweden on 13 October 1957. Three proposals were put to voters:

1. Employees would have the right to supplement their pension in proportion with earnings whilst working and linked to the 15 years in which they had the highest income. The value of the pension would be guaranteed by the government. Those earning income via other means, such as business owners, would have the right to sign up to voluntary supplementary pensions whose value would also be guaranteed by the government.
2. All income earners would have the right to sign up for voluntary pension supplements, whose value would be guaranteed by the government.
3. All income earners would have the right to sign up for voluntary pension supplements, and changes would be made to legislation to ensure their value is maintained without government involvement. The supplements would be open to collective and individual agreements.

Proposal 1 was put forward by the Social Democratic Party, which was also backed by the Communist Party (later the Left Party) and the Trade Union Confederation (LO). Proposal 2 was put forward by the Farmer's League (later the Centre Party) and proposal 3 was put forward by the Rightist Party (later the Moderate Party) and the People's Party (later the Liberals).

The first option won a plurality of the vote, receiving 46% of the ballots cast. Option 2 was the least popular, receiving only 15% of the vote.

== Results ==
Choice	Votes	%
Option 1	1,624,131	45.85
Option 2	530,576	14.98
Option 3	1,251,477	35.33
Blank votes	136,399	3.85
Total	3,542,583	100.00
Valid votes	3,542,583	99.71
Invalid votes	10,282	0.29
Total votes	3,552,865	100.00
Registered voters/turnout	4,907,701	72.39
Source: Nohlen & Stöver
