= Sten Melin =

Swedish composer (born 1957)

Sten Melin (born October 10, 1957) is a Swedish composer. He started playing the trumpet when he was 10 years old. He has written about 30 compositions, ranging from solos to orchestral works in a variety of styles. He became the president of the Society of Swedish Composers in 2000.
