= Eva Gustafsson =

Swedish middle-distance runner

Personal information
- Born: 16 December 1954 (age 71)

Sport
- Sport: Women's athletics

Achievements and titles
- Personal bests: 800 m: 2.09.30 (1976); 1500 m: 4.17.69 (1977); 3000 m: 9.12:06 (1974); 5000 m: 16.07.00 (1976); 10000 m: 35.40.82 (1992); half marathon: 1:18.33 (1990); marathon: 2:43.48 (1991)

Eva Gustafsson (born 16 December 1954) is a Swedish former middle-distance runner. Gustafsson first competed for the club Kils AIK and later SOK Sisu in the 1990s.

== Personal bests ==
- 800 meters – 2.09.3 (Karlstad, 29 June 1976)
- 1500 meters – 4.17.69 (Stockholm, 14 June 1977)
- 3000 meters – 9.12.06 (Stockholm, 31 July 1974)
- 5000 metes – 16.07.0 (Jakobstad, 30 May 1976)
- 10000 meters – 35.40.82 (Kristiansand, 3 July 1992)
- Half marathon – 1:18:33 (Karlstad 16 September 1990)
- Marathon – 2:43:48 (Karlstad, 1 June 1991)
