= 1954 in Sweden =

- Decades: 1930s; 1940s; 1950s; 1960s; 1970s
- See also: Other events of 1954; Timeline of Swedish history

Events from the year 1954 in Sweden

== Incumbents ==
- Monarch – Gustaf VI Adolf
- Prime Minister – Tage Erlander

== Events ==
- June – The Catalina affair
- Dissolution of the Kvinnliga medborgarskolan vid Fogelstad.

== Popular culture ==
=== Sport ===
- 26 February to 7 March – The 1954 World Ice Hockey Championships were held in Stockholm

=== Literature ===
- Mio, My Son, children's book by Astrid Lindgren

=== Film ===
- 26 December – Gabrielle, directed by Hasse Ekman, released

== Births ==
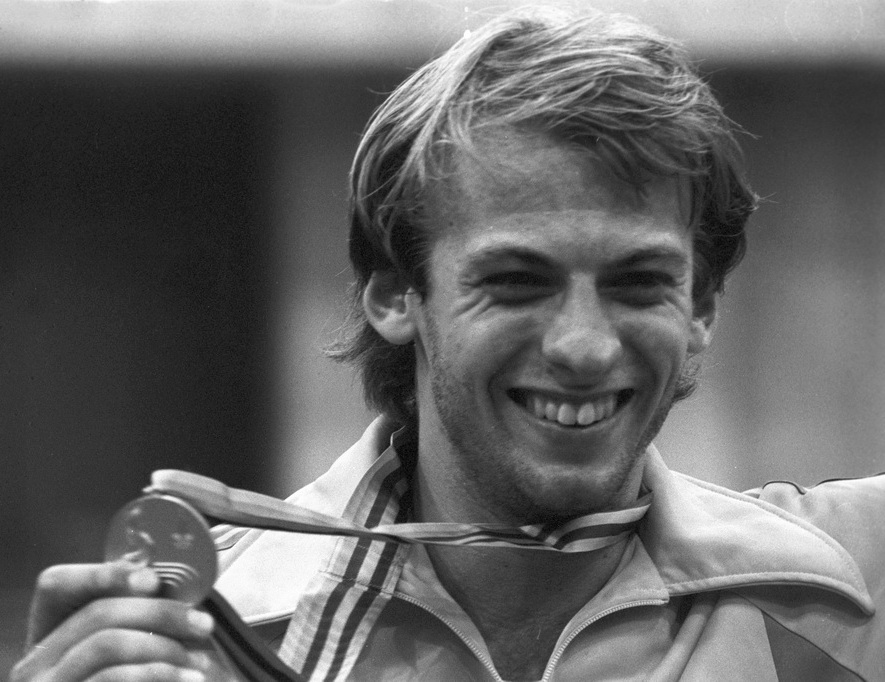
Johan Harmenberg

- 26 February – Stina Ekblad, Swedish-speaking Finnish actress
- 2 April – Lars Lerin, painter and author
- 15 April – Göran Högosta, ice hockey player
- 28 April – Peter Schantz, medical scientist
- 19 May – Lena Einhorn, director, writer and physician
- 23 July – Philip Zandén, actor
- 15 August – Stieg Larsson, writer, journalist, and far-left activist (d. 2004)
- 8 September – Johan Harmenberg, fencer.
- 28 September – Margot Wallström, Swedish Social Democratic politician
- 30 November – Suzanne Ernrup, actress
- 16 December – Eva Gustafsson, middle-distance runner

== Deaths ==
- 19 February – Axel Pehrsson-Bramstorp, politician (born 1883)
- 2 June – Lydia Wahlström, historian and women's rights activist (born 1869)
- 29 June – Thorsten Svensson, football player (born 1901)
