= Maria Stenkula =

Swedish women's education reformer

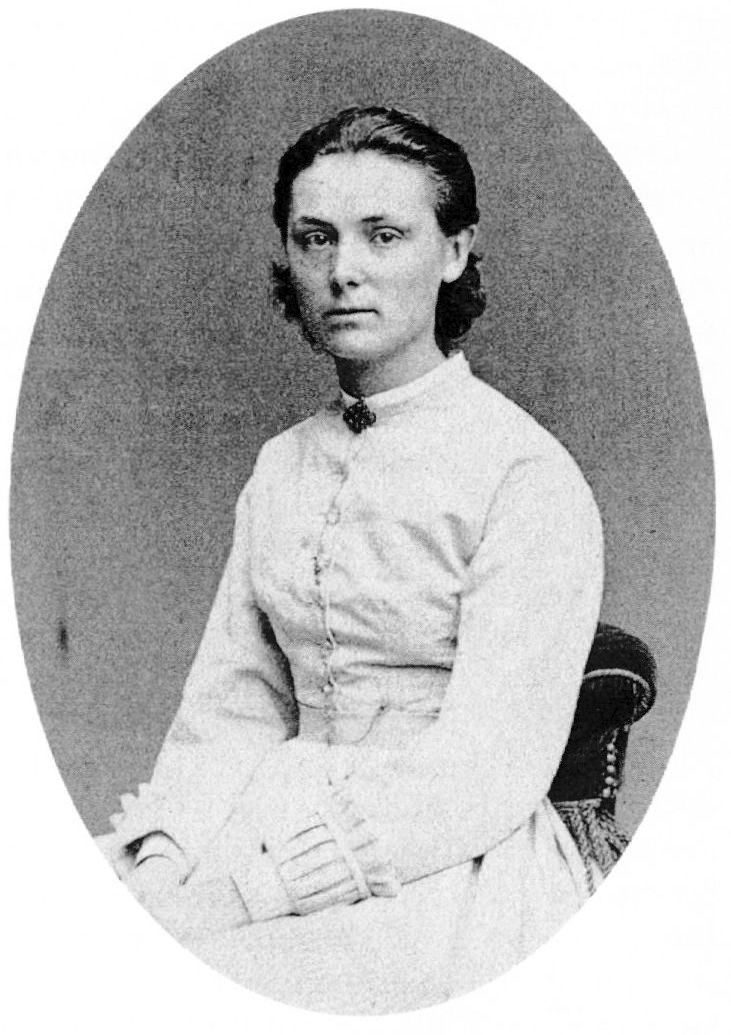
Maria Stenkula

Maria Helena Stenkula (22 July 1842 – 8 February 1932) was a Swedish reform pedagogue and pioneer on women's education. She was regarded as a local pioneer of women's education in Malmö, Sweden. She was the founder and manager of the Malmö High School for Girls (Malmö högre läroverk för flickor) from 1874 until 1899.

== Biography ==
Maria Stenkula was the daughter of physician Zacharias Fredrik Agathon Stenkula and Hedvig Margareta Maria Borg. The second eldest of 11 children, she was the sister of professor and educational reformer Anders Oskar Stenkula.(1841-1922). She spent part of her childhood as the foster child of her maternal grandfather, who was a vicar. She never married. As a person, she is described as strict but a skillful pedagogue who devoted her life to her educational ambitions.

Stenkula had educational ambitions early on, and wished to become an educated teacher rather than to support herself as a governess without formal education, as was by then most common. She was educated at the Statens normalskola för flickor in 1866-67 and the Högre lärarinneseminariet in 1867-70, from which she graduated in 1870.

=== Malmö ===
In 1874, she and her fellow student Elin Lunnerquist co-founded a girls' school in Malmö, Maria Stenkulas skola (in 1883 named Fröken Maria Stenkulas högre elementarskola för flickor, and in 1884 Malmö högre läroverk för flickor). She served as its principal between 1874 and 1899, and was also its teacher in German language and church history. Elin Lunnerquist married and left the school in 1878.

Maria Stenkula was inspired by the progressive ideas of the time, in which females should be given a serious education to enable them to be useful to society as professionals, which had been the focus in the Girls' School Committee of 1866 (Flickskolekommittén 1866) . The school of Stenkula has been referred to as the first notable school for girls in Malmö: while there were several serious secondary education schools for girls in Stockholm and Gothenburg, such opportunities had been closed to females in Malmö, the third largest city in Sweden.

While this is in fact not literary true, as Caroline Kléens skola managed the first girls' school of note in Malmö between 1850 and 1870 and Fru Elise Mayers högre läroverk för flickor the second in 1857-1888, her school was nevertheless a local pioneer establishment and known and respected for its innovations. It was very successful, arguably the largest school open to females in Malmö. In 1883, it had 200-300 students with an eight-year elementary and primary school and a three-year secondary education class. She focused in humanistic subjects, offered Swedish, French, German and English, singing education, introduced home economics, daily gymnastics, education in health, school trips and school libraries.

=== Later life ===
In 1899, Stenkula resigned from her position and left Malmö for Örkelljunga in Skåne, where she founded and managed a small school from 1900 until 1917. It too became a local pioneer institution, and lay the foundation of the local high school and public secondary educational school in Örkelljunga. In 1932, her former students founded the Maria Stenkula Memorial Fund (Maria Stenkulas minnesfond) .

In 1940, Malmö högre läroverk för flickor as well as the other girls' schools of Malmö: Tekla Åbergs högre läroverk för flickor dating from 1857 and Anna och Eva Bundts skola för flickor which dated from 1887, were all united into Malmö kommunala flickskola, the governmental girls' school which was later made co-educational.

== Related reading ==
- Malmö skolors historik 1400 till 1995
