= Scania Freight Corridor =

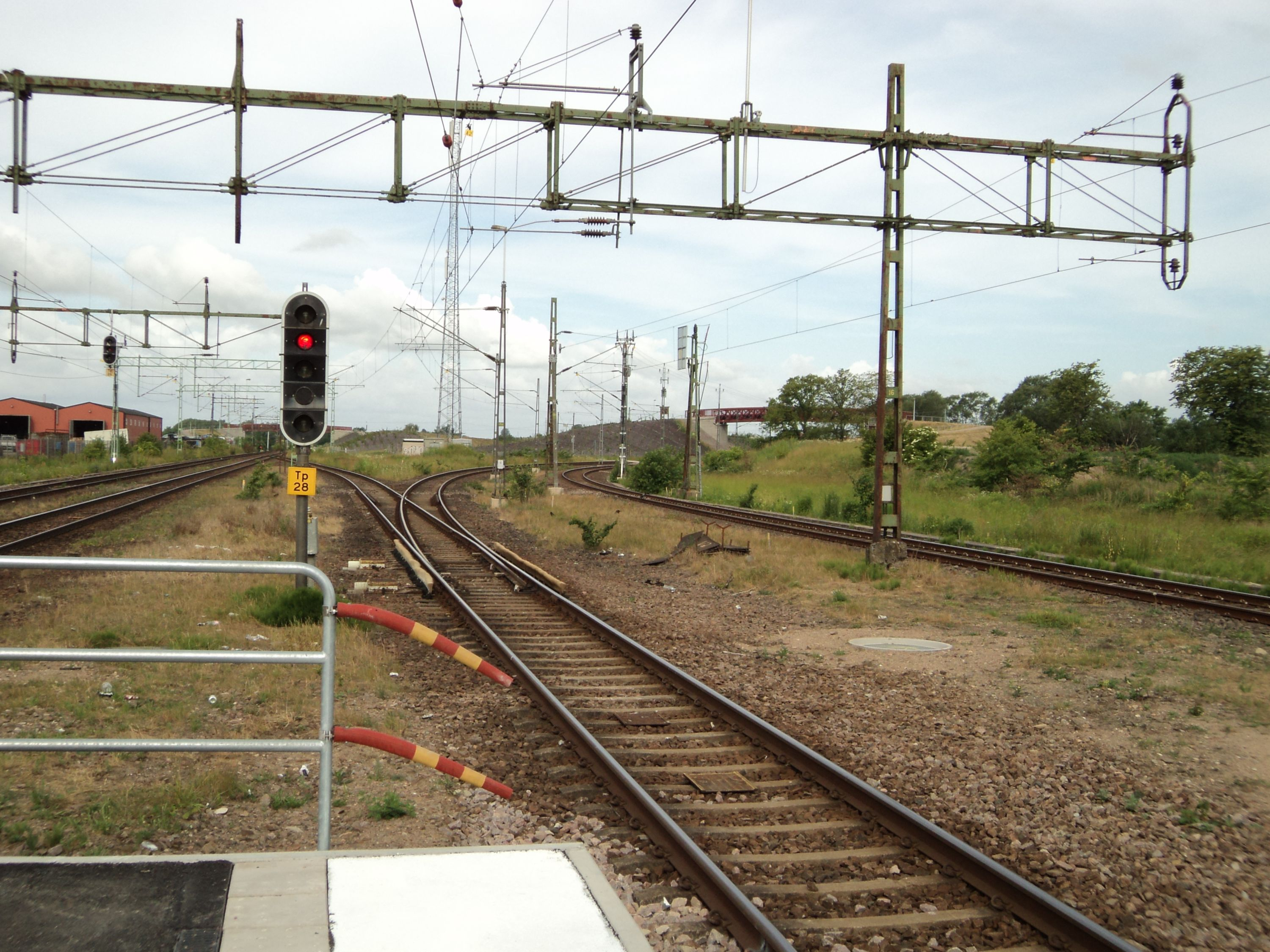
- Junction at Teckomatorp, where the Freight Corridor branches of to the left towards Åstorp. The line continuing forwards is the Råå Line to Helsingborg.

Overview
- Owner: Swedish Transport Administration
- Locale: Sweden
- Termini: Arlöv; Ängelholm

Service
- System: Swedish Railway Network
- Operator(s): Skåne Commuter Rail

History
- Opened: 1876

Technical
- Line length: 78 km (48 mi)
- Character: Commuter and freight
- Track gauge: 1,435 mm (4 ft 8 1/2 in) standard gauge
- Electrification: 15 kV 16.7 Hz AC

The Scania Freight Corridor (Swedish: Godsstråket genom Skåne) is a 78-kilometre (48 mi) long railway line between Arlöv and Ängelholm in Sweden.

It is an amalgamation of the Lomma Line between Arlöv and Kävlinge, and the Söderås Line between Teckomatorp and Åstorp. The Continental line to the port of Trelleborg is sometimes also regarded as a part of the Corridor, although retaining its separate name officially.

== History ==
Originally the section from Arlöv to Ängelholm consisted of two private railways, from Arlöv to Billesholm, which opened in 1888, and from Billeshollm to Ängelholm, which opened in 1876. Both were nationalized in 1896 along with many other railways to establish the West Coast Line. The section from Arlöv to Ängelhom was part of the West Coast Line until 2001, when a new line was opened between Ängelholm and Lund.

The Scania Freight Corridor was electrified in 1933 and 1934. Regional passenger transport was terminated in 1975 from Ängelholm to Teckomatorp, and in 1983 from Malmö to Arlöv and Kävlinge. The section from Kävlinge to Teckomatorp remains as a passenger train section and is used by the Skåne commuter rail.

It was named the Scania Freight Corridor around 1990 when the tunnel under Helsingborg was built, making almost all passenger trains along the west coast use that tunnel, leaving freight trains use the Freight Corridor, especially after the new fast railway Helsingborg–Kävlinge was opened 2001.

But between 2001 and 2015 the Freight Corridor was not used much, because of the bottleneck of the steep and curvy single-track West Coast Line north of Ängelholm over the Hallandsåsen. Therefore, most freight trains used the Markaryd Line, a large detour which also congests the Southern Main Line further east. A tunnel, the Hallandsås tunnel, was built to solve this situation and opened 2015, around 20 years later than was assumed at construction start.

After 2015 most freight trains along the West coast use the corridor, but there has also been an increase in number of passenger trains, mostly local trains, or detours for example when the railway Ängelholm-Helsingborg was upgraded 2020-2023.

== Passenger & Freight services ==
The entire Ängelholm–Trelleborg route is served by freight trains. Skånetrafiken operated Pågatåg trains between Lund and Helsingborg via Kävlinge–Teckomatorp, but the route was moved to the Marieholm Line when it opened in December 2016. There was also regular passenger trains between Malmö and Fosieby (i.e., on the Kontinentalbanan line through eastern Malmö) and on to Lockarp, where the Öresundsbanan and Ystadbanan lines connect. Skånetrafiken also operates trains Malmö-Lund-Åstorp using nearly the entirety of the Scania freight corridor.
