= Torine Torines =

- Born: Torine Charlotta Torissen; 11 April 1876; Linköping, Östergötland County
- Died: July 5, 1944 (aged 68); Stockholm
- Known for: Swedish sewing machine mechanic

Torine Charlotta Torines, née Torissen (11 April 1876 – 5 July 1944) was a Swedish sewing machine mechanic, known in contemporary Sweden as "The only female mechanic in Scandinavia" and "symaskinsdoktorn" (Doctor of the Sewing machines). She repaired around 35,000 sewing machines in her career.

== Early life ==
Torine Charlotta Torissen was born on 11 April 1876 in Linköping, Östergötland County in southeastern Sweden. Her parents managed the Torine's sewing machine's shop.

== Career ==
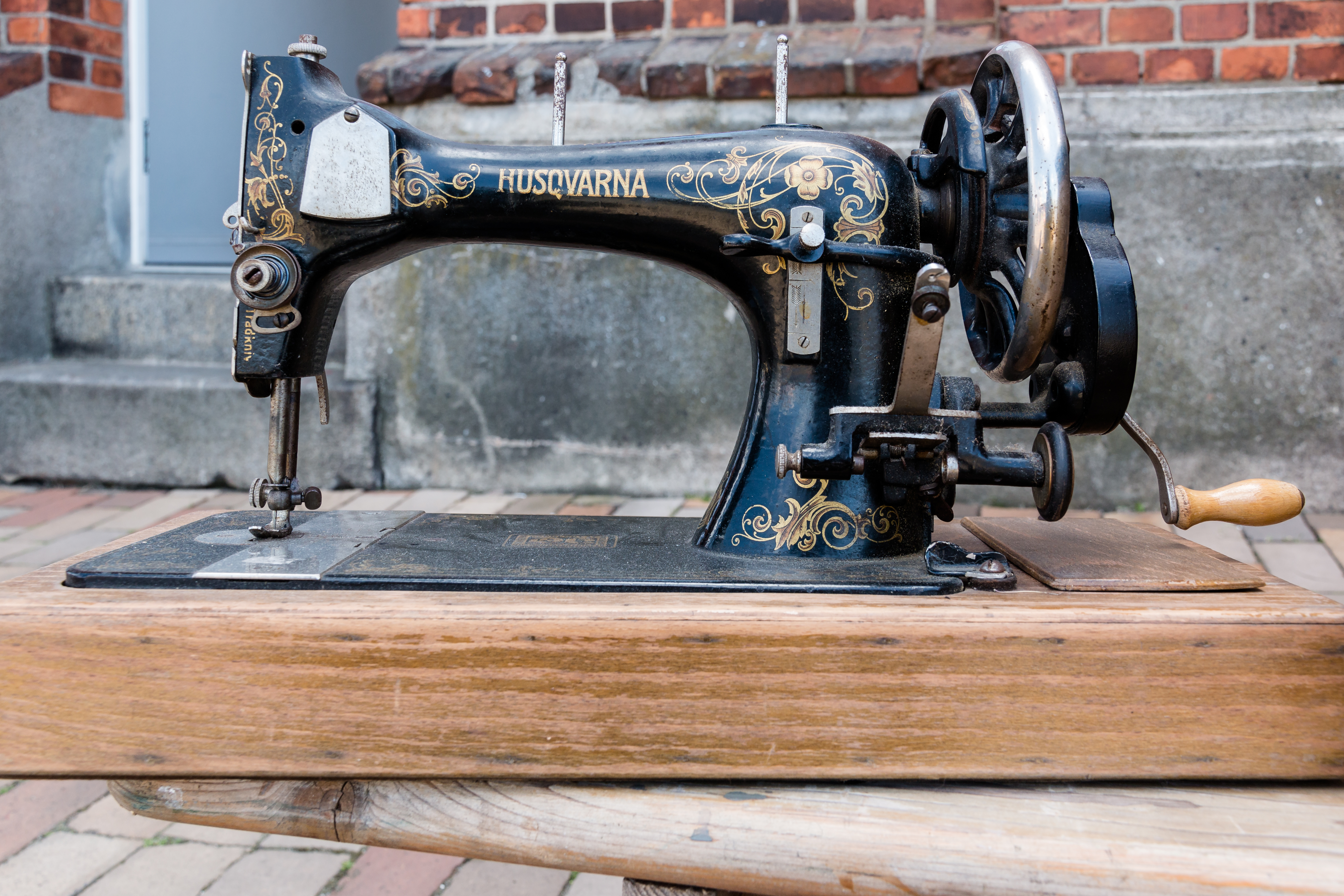
Husqvarna sewing machine of type Torines would have repaired

Torine Tornies opened her own business as a sewing machine mechanic in 1891 at the age of fifteen, with her mother working as her accountant. The shop was on Brännkyrkagatan, in a poor neighbourhood. She had a very practical approach and instead of waiting for spares to be delivered from New York or the Husqvarna sewing machine company, Torines would put a piece of scrap metal in a vice and file it into the piece required. Torines advertised in newspapers including weekly women's magazine Tidevarvet, offering to repair Husqvarna and Singer sewing machines, with satisfaction guaranteed.

The sewing machine had been introduced to Sweden in the 1850s and was from the 1860s onward so common that it was fully possible for her to support herself by repairing sewing machines. In the late 19th-century, female mechanics were uncommon enough for her to be famous as such. She was quite possibly the first professional female mechanic in the country. Her business was very successful and she worked as a sewing machines mechanic for 45 years, until she handed the business over to her children in 1936. It was calculated that she had repaired around 35,000 sewing machines by the age of 60.

Torines died on 5 July 1944 in Stockholm.

== Legacy ==
Torinetäppan, a park in Södermalm in Stockholm, was named after her in 1989.
