= Jacob Hård =

Swedish sports journalist

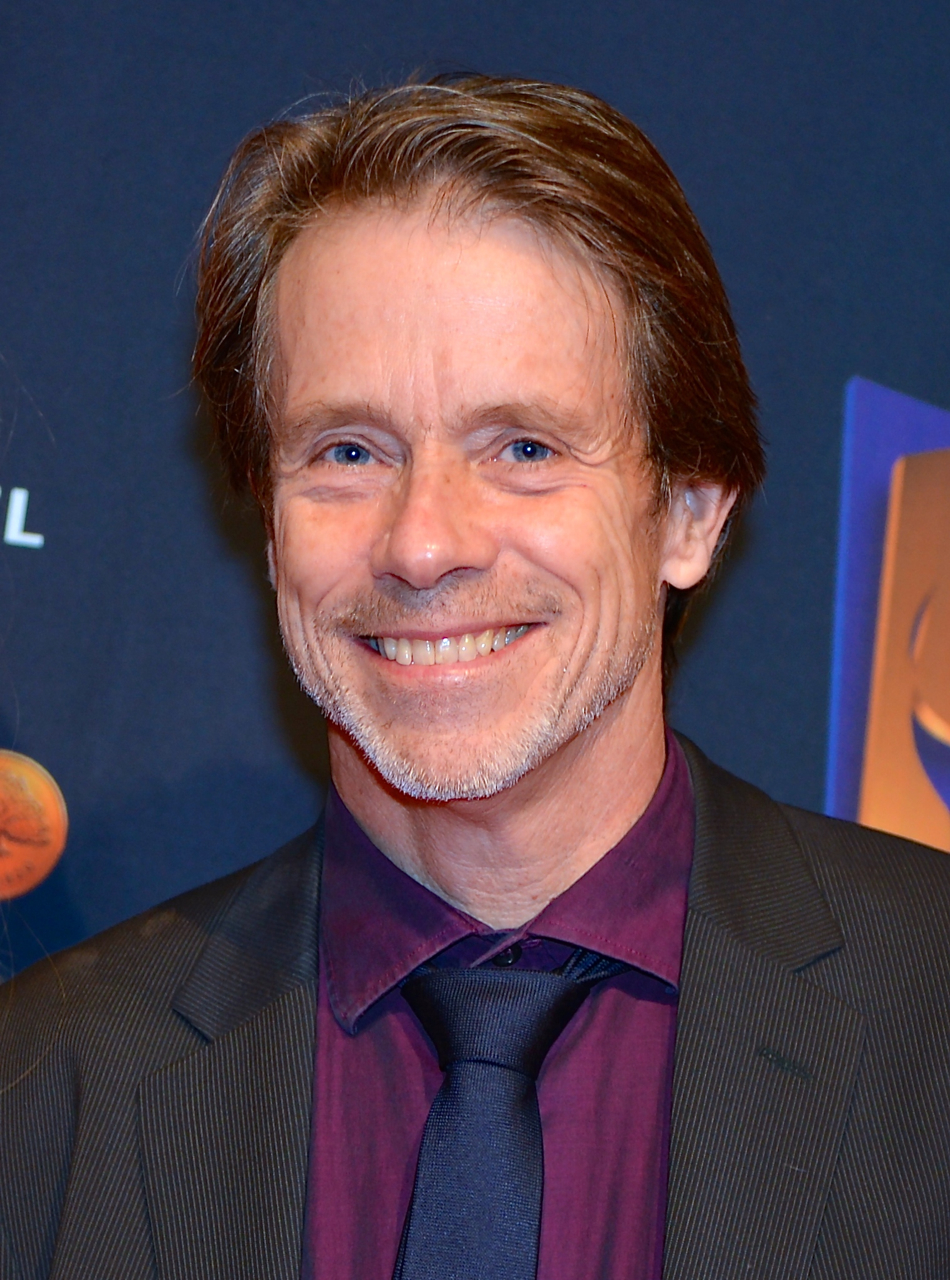
- Jacob Hård during the Swedish Sports Award in the Stockholm Globe Arena in January 2014
- Born: 5 January 1955 (age 70); Danderyd, Sweden
- Occupation: sports journalist

Bror Sven Jacob Hård af Segerstad (born 5 January 1955) is a Swedish sport journalist. He started his career at Radiosporten on Sveriges Radio in 1980 to then start working for Sveriges Television. Hård is one of Sweden's most known sports commentators as he has commentated skiing and athletics events since the 1980s. Jacob Hård is also known as the voice of Bo A Orm in Lilla Sportspegeln's animated series Zoolympiska spelen. He also voiced Tintin in the Swedish dub for the film Tintin and the Temple of the Sun.
