= Sten Selander =

Swedish writer and biologist (1891–1957)

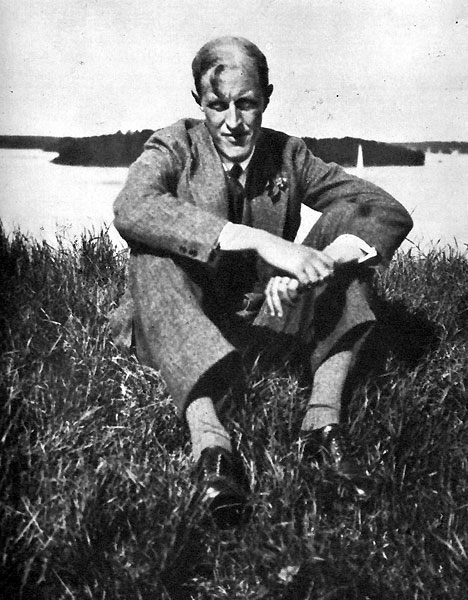
- Sten Selander at Dalarö Fortress, 1928.
- Born: 1 July 1891
- Died: 8 April 1957 (aged 65)
- Occupations: Writer and scientist
- Awards: Dobloug Prize (1952)

Sten Selander (1 July 1891 – 8 April 1957) was a Swedish writer and scientist. He made his literary debut in 1916, and was awarded the Dobloug Prize in 1952. He was a lecturer in plant biology in Uppsala, and was a member of the Swedish Academy.

Cultural offices
Preceded by Sven Hedin	Swedish Academy, Seat No 6; 1953–57	Succeeded by Olle Hedberg
