= 1880 in Sweden =

- Decades: 1860s; 1870s; 1880s; 1890s; 1900s
- See also: Other events of 1880; Timeline of Swedish history

Events from the year 1880 in Sweden

== Incumbents ==
- Monarch – Oscar II
- Prime Minister – Louis Gerhard De Geer, Arvid Posse

== Events ==
- - The foundation of Norra Latin
- - The Seventh-day Adventist Church in Sweden is established.
- - Creation of the Svenska Historiska Föreningen

== Births ==
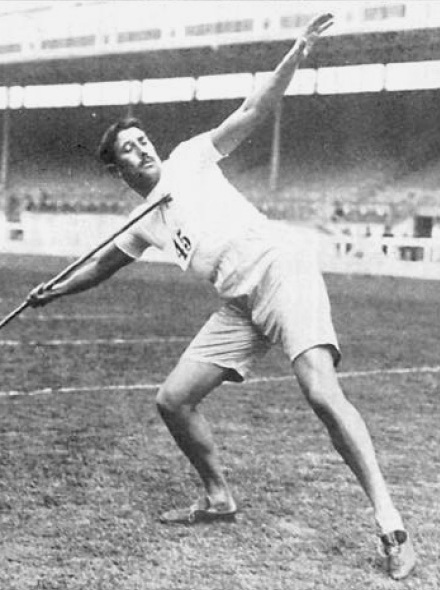
Eric Lemming became Olympic champion in javelin throw.

- 22 February – Eric Lemming, athlete (d. 1930)
- 27 February – Olivia Nordgren, politician (d.1969)
- 12 March – Henric Horn af Åminne, horse rider (d. 1947)
- 5 April
  - Eric Carlberg, modern pentathlete, fencer and sport shooter (d. 1963)
  - Vilhelm Carlberg, sport shooter (d. 1970)
- 17 May – Gustav Hedenvind-Eriksson, writer (d. 1967)
- 30 June – Elisabeth Tamm, politician (d. 1958)
- 24 July –Kristian Hellström, athlete (d. 1946)
- 4 November – John Jarlén, gymnast (d. 1955).

== Deaths ==
- 22 July - Betty Ehrenborg, writer (b. 1818)
- 10 March - Thekla Knös, writer (b. 1815)
- 14 February - Christina Enbom, opera singer (b. 1804).
