= 1875 in Sweden =

- Decades: 1850s; 1860s; 1870s; 1880s; 1890s
- See also: Other events of 1875; Timeline of Swedish history

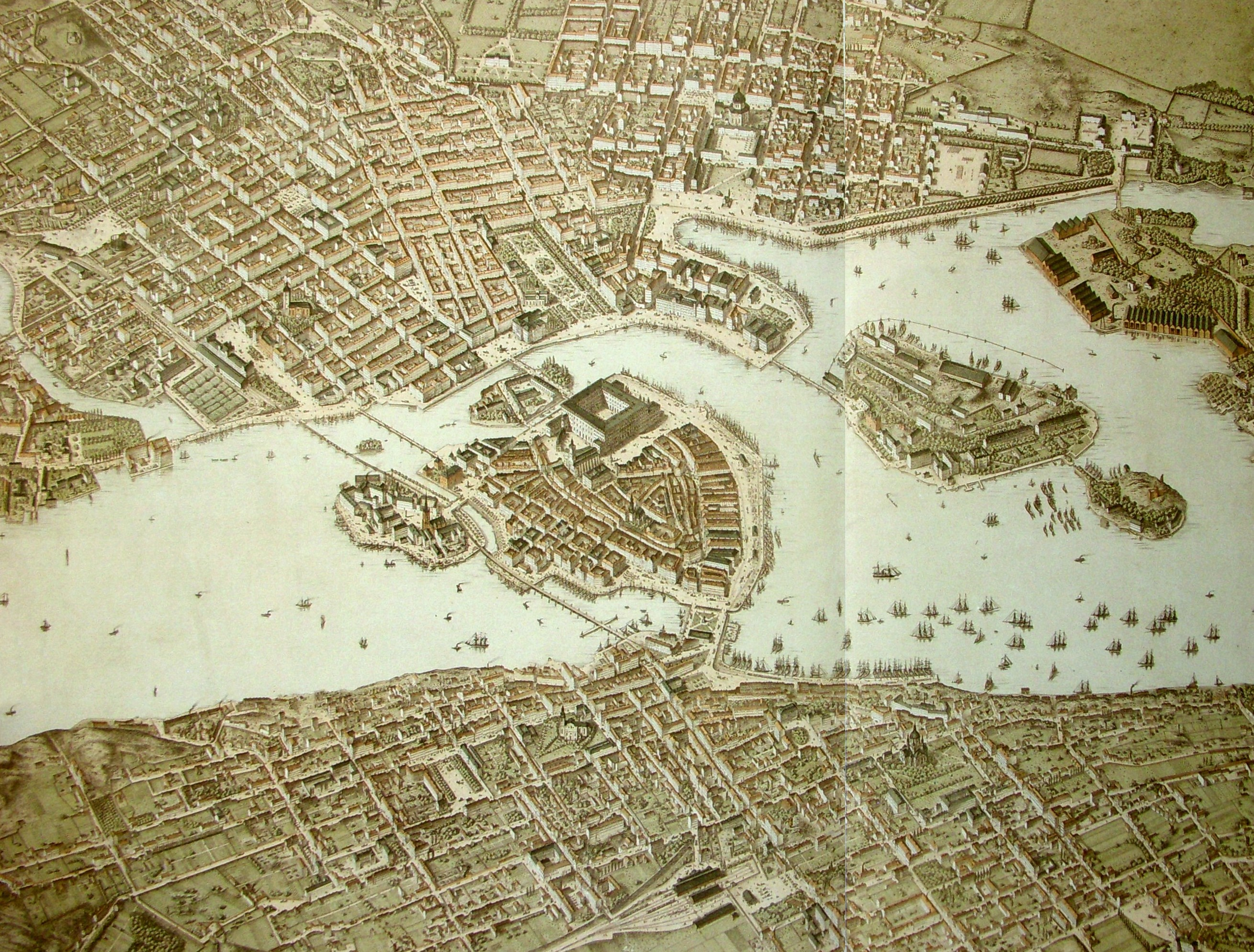

Events from the year 1875 in Sweden

== Incumbents ==
- Monarch – Oscar II reigned over Sweden during this period. His reign began in 1872 and lasted until 1907, during which he focused on modernizing the country and promoting peace in Europe.

== Events ==
- Inauguration of the Swedish Theatre (Stockholm). The Swedish Theatre in Stockholm officially opened its doors in 1875. This venue became a central hub for performing arts in Sweden, showcasing a variety of theatrical productions and contributing to the cultural landscape of the country 1
- Alfred Nobel invents the Gelignite.
- First issue of the Falkenbergs Tidning
- Göteborgs BK is founded.
- Elsa Borg move to Stockholm and open the first bible home for education of Christian social workers in the slums.
- The Rower woman profession is formally abolished (though not forbidden) in Stockholm.
- Economic, cultural and industrial shifts were marked by the Vulcan Matchstick Factory Fire.
- The Metric System was formally introduced in Sweden.

== Births ==
- 23 October - Carl Emil Pettersson was sailor, ship wreck in tabar island. He became king of tabar island
- 14 January - Felix Hamrin, prime minister. Born in 1875, Hamrin would later become a prominent politician in Sweden, serving as Prime Minister from 1920 to 1921. His contributions to Swedish politics were significant during his tenure. (died 1937)
- 21 June - Nelly Thüring, politician. Thüring was born into a politically active family and became known for her work as a politician advocating for women's rights and social justice throughout her life. (died 1972)

== Deaths ==
- 28 February - Sophia Isberg, wood cut artist (born 1819)
- 5 July - Maria Röhl, portrait artist (born 1801)
- 18 November - Martina von Schwerin, Lady of letters, salonist and culture personality (born 1789)
