= Tisselskog Church =

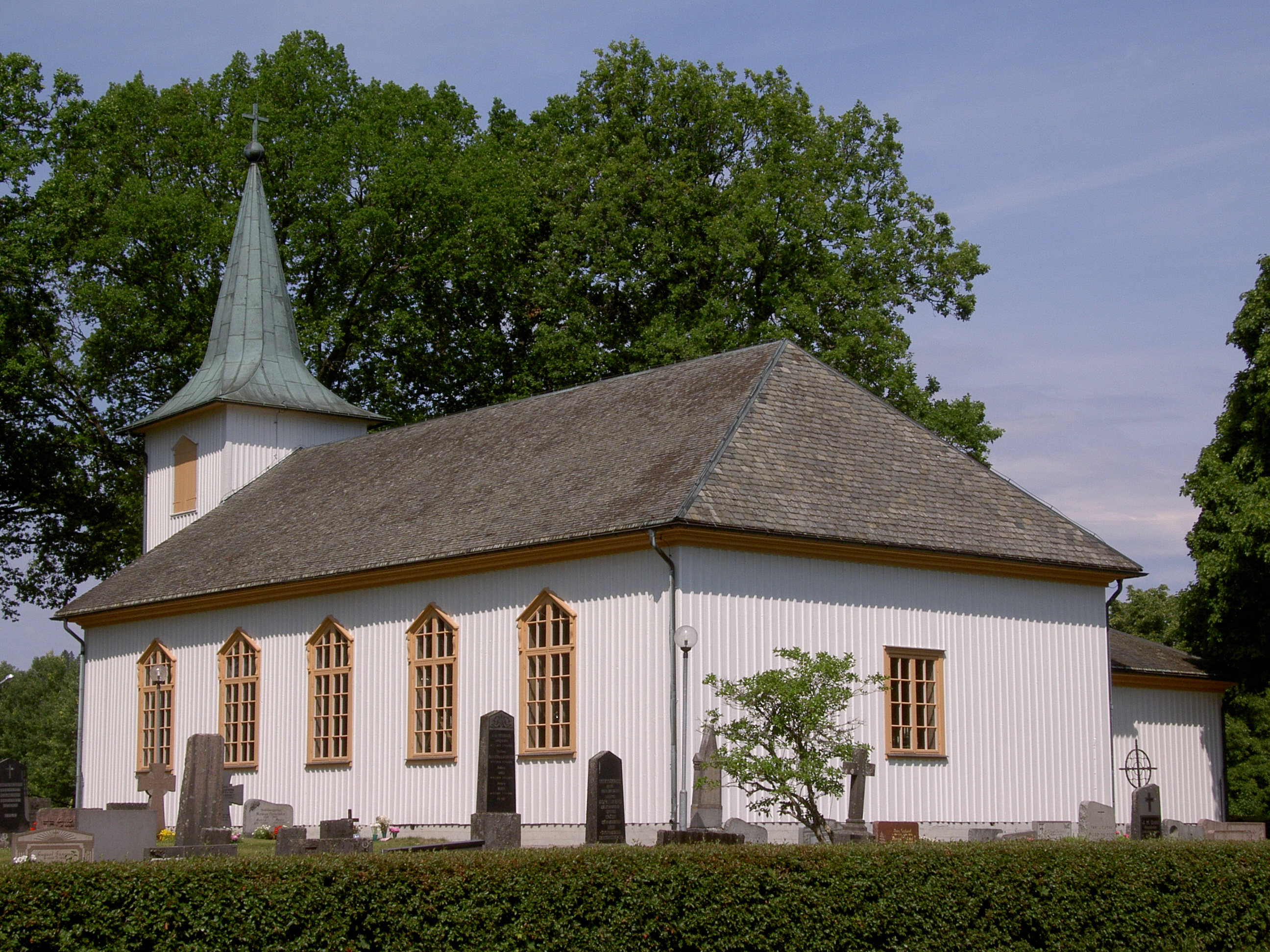
- Tisselskog Church in June 2009

- Location of Tisselskog Church in Västra Götaland County
- 58°54′29.22″N 12°23′46.24″E
- Location: Tisselskog, Västra Götaland County
- Country: Sweden
- Denomination: Church of Sweden
- Website: Steneby parish

History
- Consecrated: 1877

Tisselskog Church (Swedish: Tisselskogs kyrka) belongs to the Steneby-Tisselskogs parish in the Diocese of Karlstad, Sweden. The church is located on a hill about 2 km (1.2 mi) north of Lake Råvarpen, a part of the Dalsland Canal. Approximately 500 metres (1,600 ft) south of the church is a former clergy house, built in 1935. In the south part of the grave yard is a mourge built in the 1940s and a storage house built in 1995.

== History ==
The church building is assumed to be the third in Tisselskog and like the former two, it is made out of wood. The first church was erected during the Middle Ages and was located about 1 km (0.62 mi) south of the present building. The second church was built in 1724–1727 on the same location as the present. The church tower and parts of the west wall in the present building are remnants of the second church.

== Architecture ==
The current wooden church in simple Neo-Gothic style was built in 1877, designed by engineer Emil Olsson. The building is a rectangular nave with an uninterrupted wall in the east and the church tower as a part of the west wall. An extension of the building on the northeast side used to be a sacristy. The main entrance is on the west side through the church porch on the ground floor of the tower. Traces of the previous church can be seen in the porch as well as at the west wall inside the church. In the ceiling there are boards with paintings from the old church.

The exterior walls covered with white-painted wood paneling and the pointed windows are angular, as are the shutters in the tower. The nave has a dual-pitched roof that is hipped in the east. The roofs of the nave and the former sacristy are made of slate, and tower has a copper-clad spire. The interior walls and the ceiling are clad with paneling, some of it from the 1910s.

== Renovations ==
During a renovation of the church during 1915–16, the interior walls and ceiling were covered in panelling. The layout of the altar was changed by replacing the altarpiece with the original one from 1725. A stained glass choir window was installed as well as the old medieval baptismal font.

During the 1960s and 70s plans for demolishing the barely century-old nave were being discussed. The church had been neglected for long and the value of the building was questioned, because of the disproportionately long nave and the short tower. Instead of tearing it down, a comprehensive renovation was made in 1977, under the supervision of architects Uno Asplund and Janne Feldt from Karlstad. The proportions of the nave were altered by making a hipped roof in the east section. The disposition of the building was also altered. The nave was shortened by building a new wall behind the altar. The room behind the altar became the new sacristy, while the old one in the extension was converted into facilities for the church staff. The area under the organ loft was sealed off with folding screens made of wood. The panelling on the west wall was removed to uncover the older timber walls with paintings.

== Furnishings ==
The inventories in the church are:

- The oldest object in the church is the soapstone baptismal font from the 13th century. The font is placed in the south part of the choir on a decorated wooden base.
- The organ has ten stops and is built in 1977, by Magnussons Organ Constructors in Gothenburg. The organ is placed on the south side of the loft in order to accommodate a choir as well.
- The altarpiece was made by Lars Hasselbom from Lidköping in 1735, in Baroque style and it consists of two paintings. The lower painting depicts the Last Supper and the one above it, the Ascension of Jesus. Both paintings were renovated in 1977.
- The altar is made of light green, stained wood and was probably added in 1977.
- Two hymn boards are mounted on the wall on opposite sides of the altar. They are probably from the 19th century.
- The blue and pink pulpit is probably contemporary with the present building (1877). It was lowered and repainted in 1977, and a baldachin was added to it.
