= Carl Johan Billmark =

Swedish landscape painter (1804–1870)

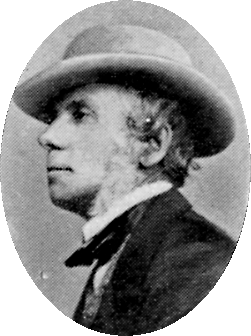
Portrait of Billmark

Carl Johan Billmark (1804–1870) was a Swedish landscape painter.

== Life ==
Billmark was born at Stockholm in 1804. He visited Dalecarlia, St. Petersburg, and Paris, where he studied under Deroy. From 1828 to 1830 he published 100 lithographic landscape studies, and in 1833, whilst in Paris, he produced 29 works, representing the scenery of his native country; and later on 24 plates of views on the Rhine, and also 100 plates in a work entitled, Journey from Stockholm to Naples. He was a member of the Academy of Stockholm, and received the decoration of the Wasa order. He died in Paris in 1870.

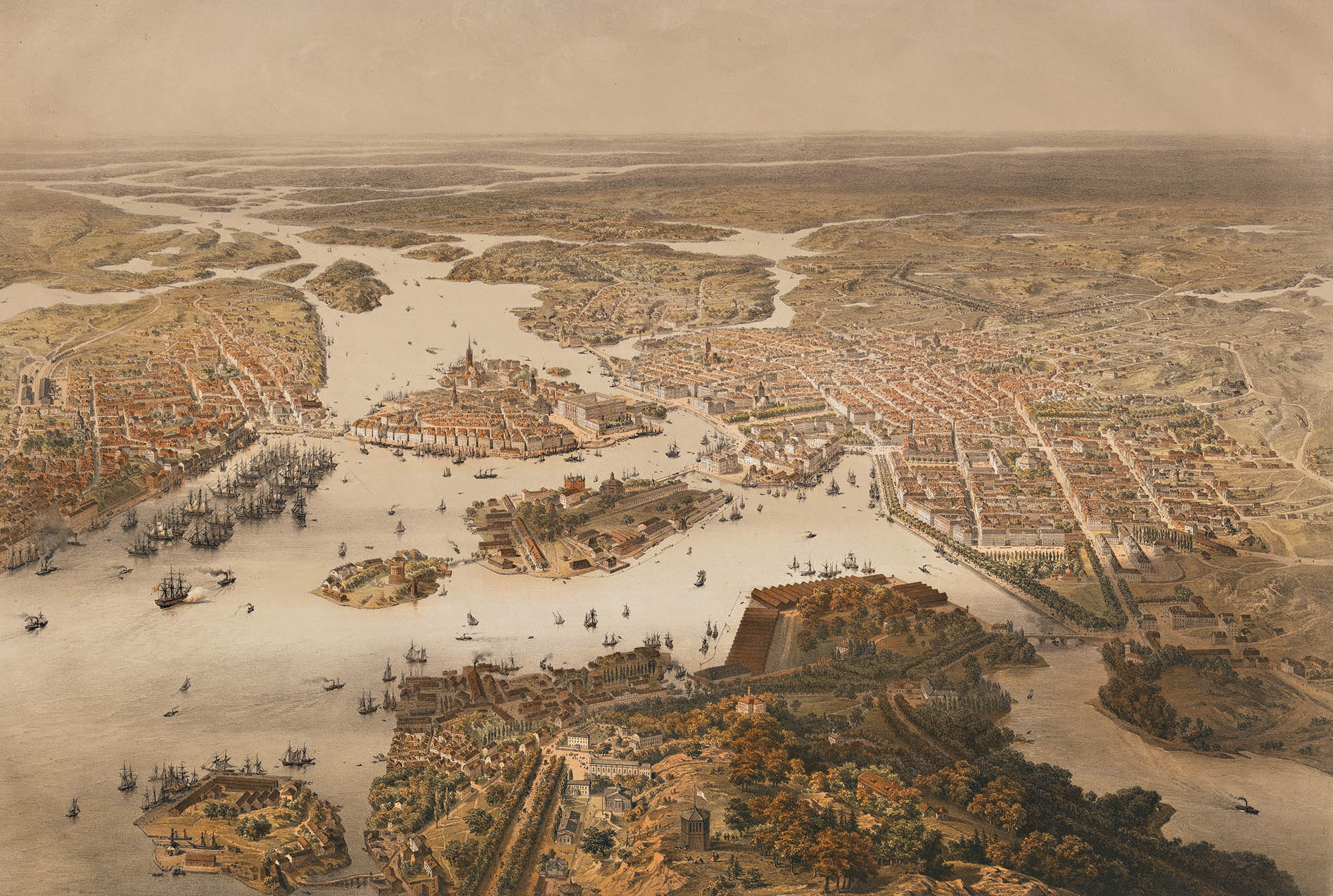
Panorama of Stockholm, 1868.

== Sources ==
- Un disegno a Pontecorvo (Frosinone, Italia), su CepranoCity.wp
