= Celina Runeborg =

Swedish painter and map engraver

Celina Runeborg (17 February 1878 – 1977) was a Swedish painter and map engraver from Stockholm.

Runeborg was the daughter of the merchant Abraham Rubenson and Frida Kaiser and from 1907 married the brewmaster Ivar Runeborg and mother of Greta Runeborg-Tell. Runeborg studied with Adolf Lindberg and C.W. Jaensson at the Technical School in Stockholm and during study trips to Germany. When she was employed by the Swedish Maritime Administration, she was Sweden's only female chart engraver. In addition to her work, she worked as an artist. Separately or together with another artist, she exhibited in Stockholm, Gothenburg, Örebro and Copenhagen. Her art consists of cityscapes, landscapes and, as a specialty, floral motifs.
