= Gustaf Björnram =

Gustaf Björnram (1746–1804) was a Swedish mystic and Spiritualist medium.

He was born in Savolax as the son of the lieutenant Per Björnram (1700–1766) and Anna Margareta Amnorin. He studied at the Royal Academy of Turku and moved to Stockholm where he became a private teacher and a secretary. Through his work as a writer for the Freemasons he came in to contact with Elis Schröderheim, who introduced him to King Gustav III of Sweden.

Gustaf Björnram claimed to be able to communicate with the spirits of the dead and arranged well-attended séances frequented by the king and Prince Charles, during which he allegedly forwarded predictions about the future from the dead. For a couple of years around 1780, he was an immensely fashionable medium in Stockholm, was inducted into the Freemasons and given a Sinecure by the monarch. He once performed a séance in the church of Lovö, where he called upon the spirit of Adolf Frederick, King of Sweden in the presence of the king and a circle of his favorites, among them Adolf Fredrik Munck, where the father of the king appeared as a mask behind a curtain of smoke in the dark church.

However, when his prediction about the death of the king's mother, which was eagerly awaited by the king, did not materialize, and the royal physician Sven Anders Hedin (1750–1821) exposed him as a fraud by describing how he had witnessed his preparations for the so-called seance in the Lovö church, he lost his favor with the king, who gave him a pension and dismissed him from court. He was replaced by Henrik Gustaf Ulfvenklou.
