= Charlotte Thitz =

Finnish educator (1799–1889)

Anna Charlotte Thitz (11 December 1799, in Loviisa – 22 March 1889, in Helsinki), was a Finnish educator. She was active as a governess and the leader of a girls school. She is considered as an important representative of the contemporary development of female education in Finland.

She was the daughter of the miniature painter Anders Gustaf Thitz from Germany. She managed a girls school in Loviisa from 1826 until 1841, after which she worked as a private teacher, a governess and gave private lessons in piano playing to upper class families in Vaasa and Heinola until 1870.
