= Anna Cervin =

Swedish artist (1878–1972)

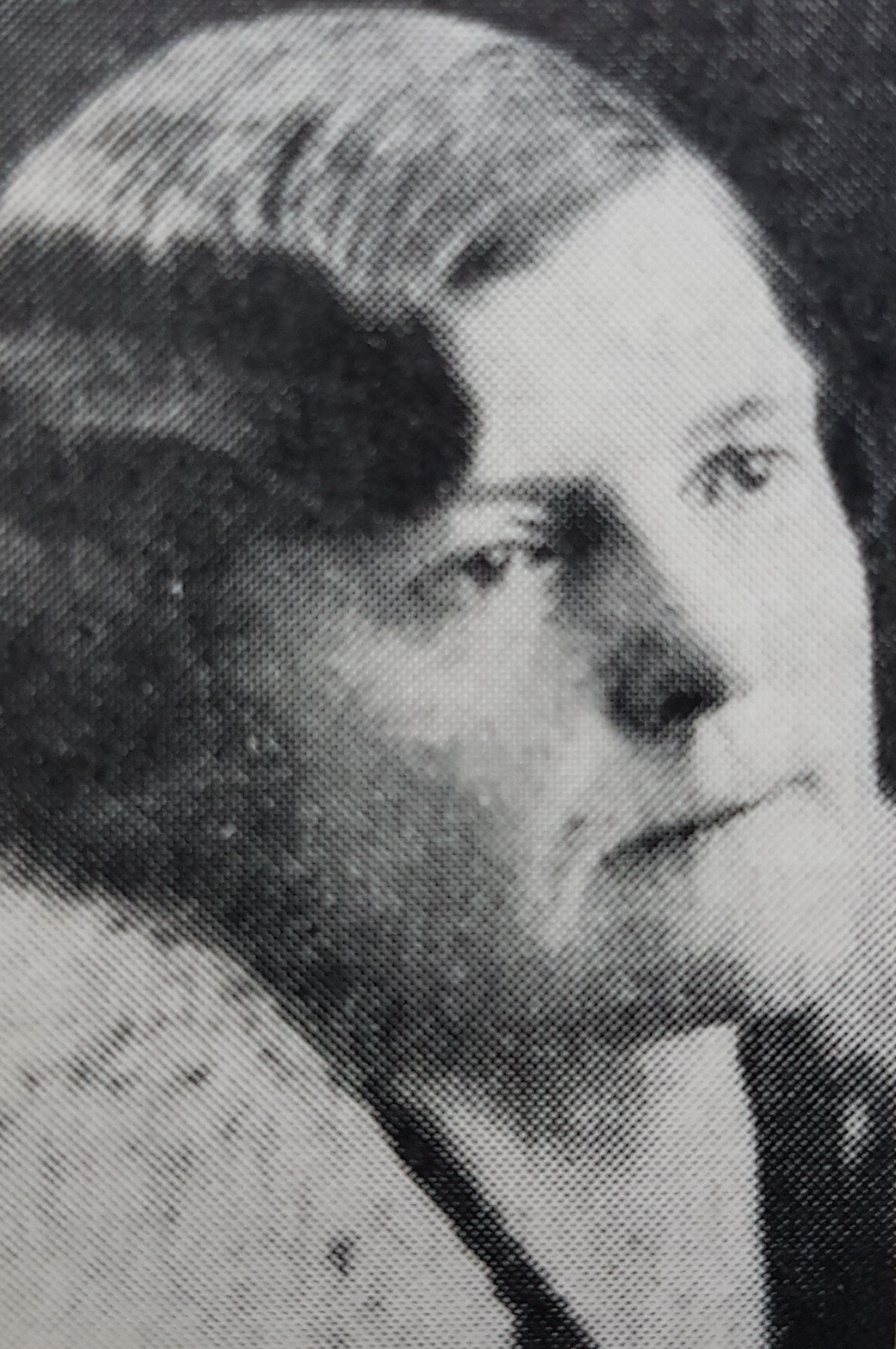
- Born: Anna Kristina Cervin; 27 May 1878; Holmedal, Sweden
- Died: 1972 (aged 93–94)
- Education: Royal Swedish Academy of Arts (1898–1903); Académie Colarossi (1903–1904); Harriet Backer School (1907–1908)
- Spouse: Jens Munthe-Svendsen (1904–1912)

Anna Kristina Cervin (27 May 1878 in Holmedal, Sweden – 1972) was a Swedish artist, primarily known for her painting work.

== Early life ==
Cervin was the daughter of August Cervin and Emma Brattén.

== Career and artistic style ==
She studied at the Royal Swedish Academy of Arts in Stockholm between 1898 and 1903, at the Académie Colarossi in Paris between 1903 and 1904, and at the Harriet Backer School in Oslo between 1907 and 1908. She worked in Sweden. At first she mainly painted still life portraits and landscape paintings, mostly with oil.

She became known for her skill copying family portraits and older paintings. She was featured in several Swedish artists' exhibitions and in the exhibition Fem målarinnor in Värmlands Museum in 1948, and at Lund University's art exhibition in 1919.

Her works are presented at the Nationalmuseum and in the Värmlands museum in Karlstad, among others.

== Personal life ==
She was married to the Norwegian sculptor Jens Munthe-Svendsen between 1904 and 1912.
