= Sophia Magdalena Gardelius =

Sophia Magdalena Gardelius (1804-1881) was a Swedish damaskweaver. She is regarded as a pioneer within the damask weaving technique of Gotland.

She married a farmer of Roma parish of Gotland in 1822. When her spouse was ruined, they moved to her parents, and she began to weave and sell damask to support the family. In 1832, she advertised that she manufactured damask for commission and accepted pupils in the art. The art of weaving damask was then new and popular. Gardelius composed her own patterns by mathematic measurements, and her weaving stools were constructed to adjust to her needs to handle a thousand patterns. Her weaving school and workshop was very successful, she became famous in contemporary Sweden and her clients included the queen, Josephine of Leuchtenberg. Her school was closed in 1879 but her business was taken over by her daughters in 1881 and continued until 1921.
