= 1879 in Sweden =

- Decades: 1850s; 1860s; 1870s; 1880s; 1890s
- See also: Other events of 1879; Timeline of Swedish history

Events from the year 1879 in Sweden

== Incumbents ==
- Monarch – Oscar II
- Prime Minister – Louis Gerhard De Geer

== Events ==
- - The Gothenburg tram network began operation.
- - The first issue of the Karlstads-Tidningen.
- - The Sabbatsberg Hospital is founded.
- - The first national Flickskolemöte (Girl School Meeting) to reform female education is summoned by Hilda Caselli.

== Births ==
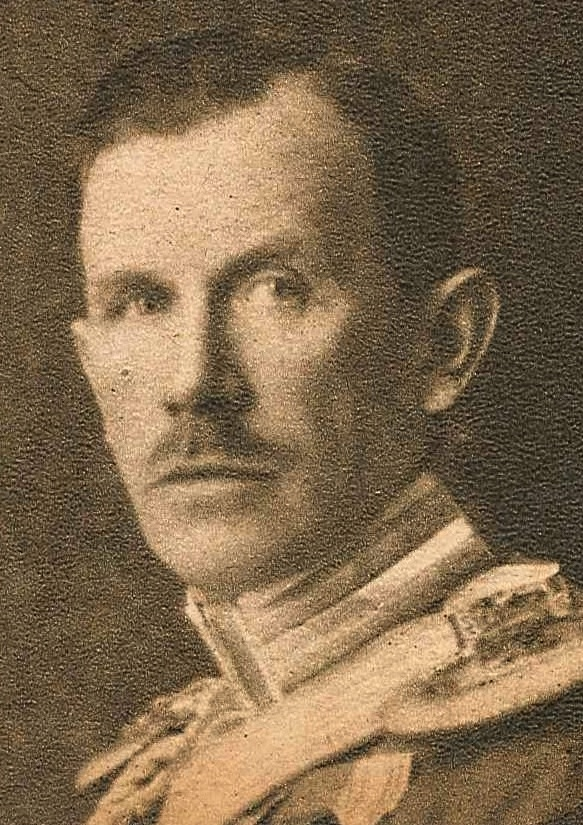
Count Gustaf Lewenhaupt.

- 13 April – Johan Petter Åhlén, businessman and Olympic medalist (d. 1939)
- 26 June – Gustaf Adolf Jonsson, sport shooter (died 1949).
- 14 August – Bernhard Larsson, sport shooter (died 1947).
- 20 August – Gustaf Lewenhaupt, count, military officer and horse rider (died 1962).
- 10 December – Hanna Grönvall, politician and trade union worker (died 1953)

== Deaths ==
- 3 January - Anna Johansdotter Norbäck, founder and leader of the religious movement Annaniterna (born 1804)
- 26 February – Anna Nordlander, painter (born 1843)
