= Dorothea Dunckel =

Swedish writer (1799–1878)

Maria Dorothea Dunckel née Altén (13 March 1799 – 30 November 1878), was a Swedish poet, translator and playwright.

Dunckel was born to the secretary Martin Altén and Kristina Dorotea Landwertz.

She wrote her first theatre play-manuscript at the age of nine (1808), and after this, assisted her father with translations.

Married in 1821 to the David Vilhelm Dunckel, vicar at the German parish of Stockholm, and from 1823, vicar at the German parish in Gothenburg.

== Work ==
- Receptet (translation, 1813)
- Förlofningen (play, 1817)
- Förstlingar (1824)
- Dramatiska och lyriska försök (poems, 4 parts 1828–1832)
- Marie, en liten gåfva i bref till mina unga landsmaninnor (1830)
- Vilhelms brefväxling med sina vänner (1835)
- Pensionsvännerna (1842)
- Två systrar i Östergötland (1844)
- Gammalt och nytt ur min portfölj (1865)
