= Eva Hellstrand =

Swedish politician

Eva Christina Hellstrand (born 1957), raised in Nordhallen in western Jämtland, is a farmer and a Swedish politician. She is a member of the Centre Party. Hellstrand has a KRAV-labelled farm in Undersåker as well as multiple dairy cows. Hellstrand has been an active opponent to the European Union.
