= 1802 in Sweden =

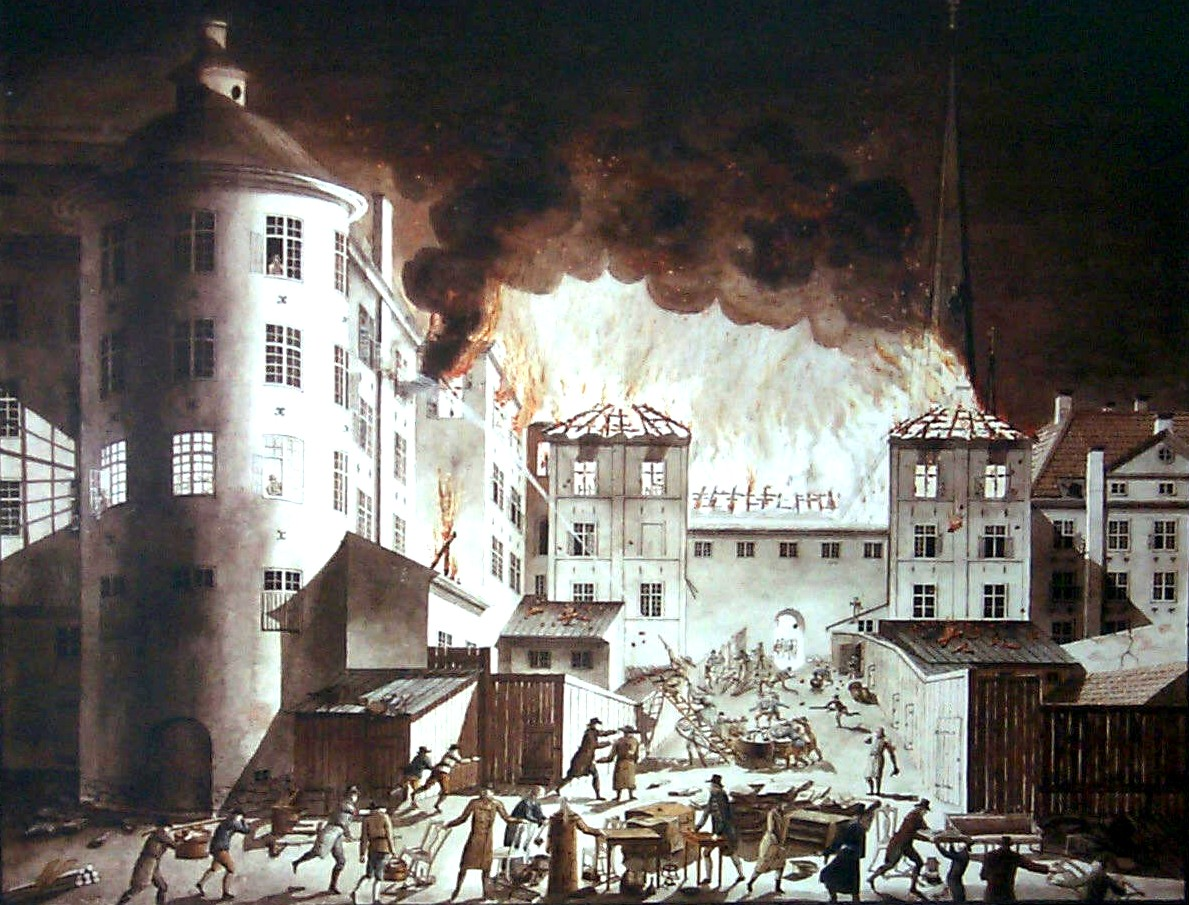
Brand1802

Events from the year 1802 in Sweden

== Incumbents ==
- Monarch – Gustav IV Adolf

== Events ==
- 10 July - The British occupation of the Swedish colony of Saint Barthélemy discontinues.
- - Tantalum discovered by Anders Gustaf Ekeberg.
- - The foundation of the Yellow Rose (society).
- - The Cause célèbre of Metta Fock.

== Births ==
- 25 March - Maria Silfvan, actress (died 1865)
- - Emma Fürstenhoff, florist (died 1871)
- Anna Charlotta von Sydow (died 1865)

== Deaths ==
- 9 October - Ebba Morman, actress (born 1769)
- - Adolf Ludvig Hamilton, politician, memoir writer (born 1747)
