= 1829 in Sweden =

- Years in Sweden: 1826 1827 1828 1829 1830 1831 1832
- Centuries: 18th century · 19th century · 20th century
- Decades: 1790s 1800s 1810s 1820s 1830s 1840s 1850s
- Years: 1826 1827 1828 1829 1830 1831 1832

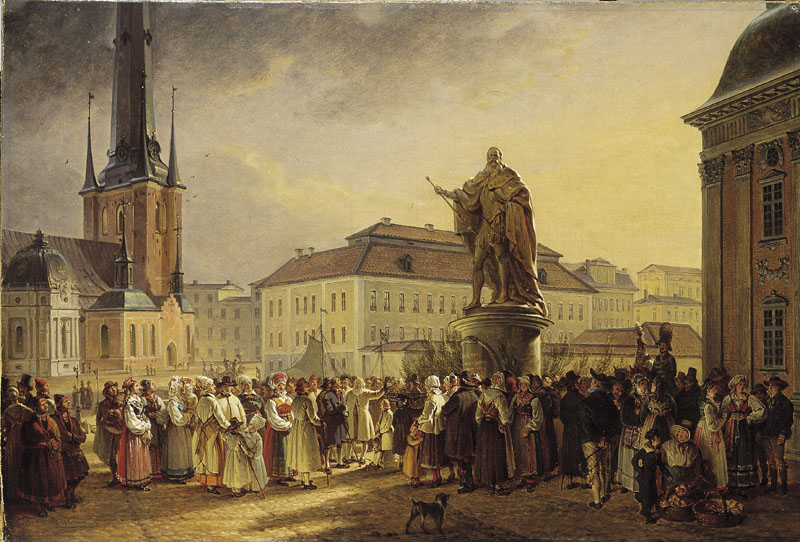

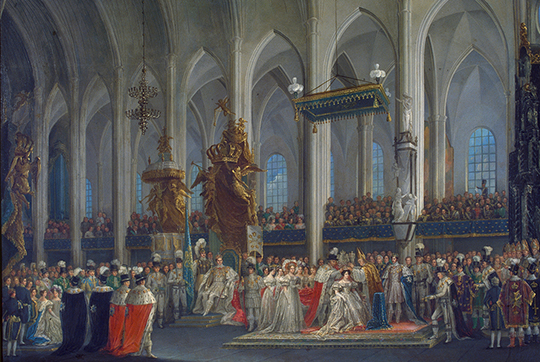
Desideria of Sweden coronation 1829 by Fredric Westin

Events from the year 1829 in Sweden

== Incumbents ==
- Monarch – Charles XIV John

== Events ==
- 21 August – The coronation of queen Désirée Clary in Stockholm.
- - The Chalmers University of Technology is established.
- - Jönköpings SS is founded.
- - Midwives are allowed to use surgical instruments, which are unique in Europe at the time and gives them surgical status.

== Births ==
- 21 January – Oscar II of Sweden, monarch (died 1907)
- 26 April – Eva Brag, journalist, novelist and poet (died 1913)
- 2 July – Martis Karin Ersdotter, businessperson (died 1902)
- 14 October – August Malmström, painter (died 1901)
- 3 December – Augusta Björkenstam, countess and businessperson (died 1892)
- Hanna Hammarström, inventor (died 1909)
- Emanuella Carlbeck, pioneer in the education of students with Intellectual disability (died 1901)

== Deaths ==
- 17 March - Sophia Albertina, Abbess of Quedlinburg (born 1753)
- 9 November - Carl Gustaf af Leopold, poet (born 1756)
