= 1902 in Sweden =

- Decades: 1880s; 1890s; 1900s; 1910s; 1920s
- See also: Other events of 1902; Timeline of Swedish history

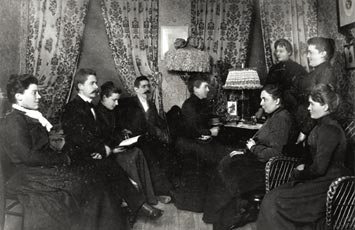
1902 meeting of the Committee for Women's Agitation, the precursor of the Women's Trade Union. The meeting was held at the residence of Anna Sterky. Kata Dahlström is seen of the left.

Events from the year 1902 in Sweden

== Incumbents ==
- Monarch – Oscar II
- Prime Minister – Erik Gustaf Boström

== Events ==
- 19 September - Swedish Employers Association is founded.
- Women's Trade Union is founded.
- Vaksamhet is founded.

== Births ==
- 31 January - Alva Myrdal, social democrat (died 1986)
- 21 July - Margit Manstad, actress (died 1996)
- 11 November - Solveig Rönn-Christiansson, communist (died 1982)
- 1 September - Linde Klinckowström-von Rosen, writer and equestrian (died 2000)

== Deaths ==
- 10 April – Pontus Fürstenberg, art collector (born 1827)
- 2 May – Jane Miller Thengberg, educator (born 1822)
- 18 September – Thorborg Rappe, social reformer (born 1832)
- 5 October – Ebba Boström, nurse and a philanthropist (born 1844)
- Adolfina Fägerstedt, ballerina (died 1811)
- Martis Karin Ersdotter, businessperson (born 1829)
