= 1904 in Sweden =

- Decades: 1880s; 1890s; 1900s; 1910s; 1920s
- See also: Other events of 1904; Timeline of Swedish history

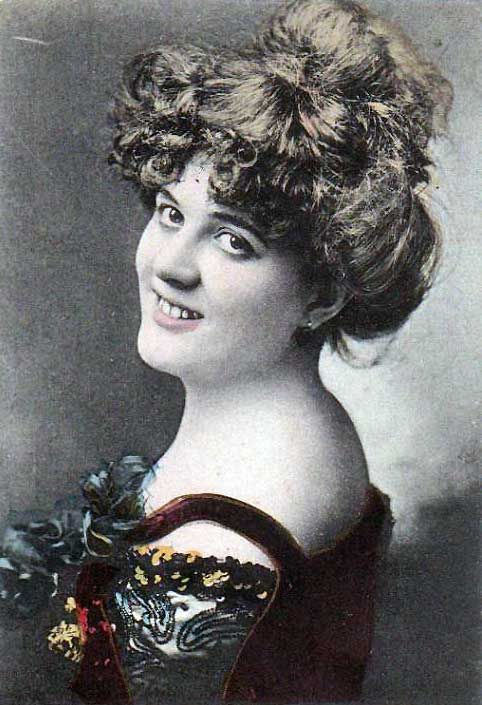
Rosa Grünberg in 1904

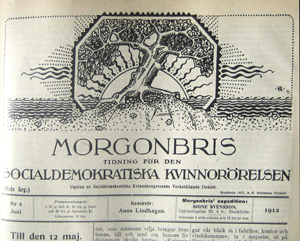
Morgonbris

Events from the year 1904 in Sweden.

== Incumbents ==
- Monarch – Oscar II
- Prime Minister – Erik Gustaf Boström

== Events ==
- 10 January - The Swedish Antarctic Expedition returns to Stockholm.
- 18 December – The Swedish Football Association is founded in Stockholm.
- Date unknown – First issue of Morgonbris.
- Date unknown – From this year until 1909, co-education is introduced in a number of state secondary education schools, which makes private girls schools redundant.

== Births ==
- 4 January - Hjördis Töpel, Olympic diver and swimmer
- 13 January - Ewa Olliwier, Olympic diver
- 18 January - John Axel Nannfeldt, botanist and mycologist
- 24 January - Wivan Pettersson, Olympic swimmer
- 29 February - Helmer Grundström, writer
- 31 March - Harald Berglund, cinematographer
- 1 April - Holger Löwenadler, film actor
- 2 April - Karl Ragnar Gierow, theater director, author and translator
- 8 April - Georg Werner, Olympic freestyle swimmer
- 6 May - Harry Martinson, writer, recipient of the Nobel Prize in Literature
- 22 May - Uno Lamm (born August Uno Lamm), electrical engineer and inventor
- 2 July - Erik Lundin, chess master
- 19 July - Vera Schmiterlöw, film actress
- 10 October – Göta Rosén, politician and child welfare inspector

== Deaths ==
- 19 April - Hanna Styrell, actress and royal mistress (born 1842)
- 29 May - Maria Paulina Åhman, harpist (born 1812)
- 11 June - Clas Theodor Odhner, historian (born 1836)
- 15 October - Anna Stecksén, scientist (born 1870)
