= 1830 in Sweden =

- Years in Sweden: 1827 1828 1829 1830 1831 1832 1833
- Centuries: 18th century · 19th century · 20th century
- Decades: 1800s 1810s 1820s 1830s 1840s 1850s 1860s
- Years: 1827 1828 1829 1830 1831 1832 1833

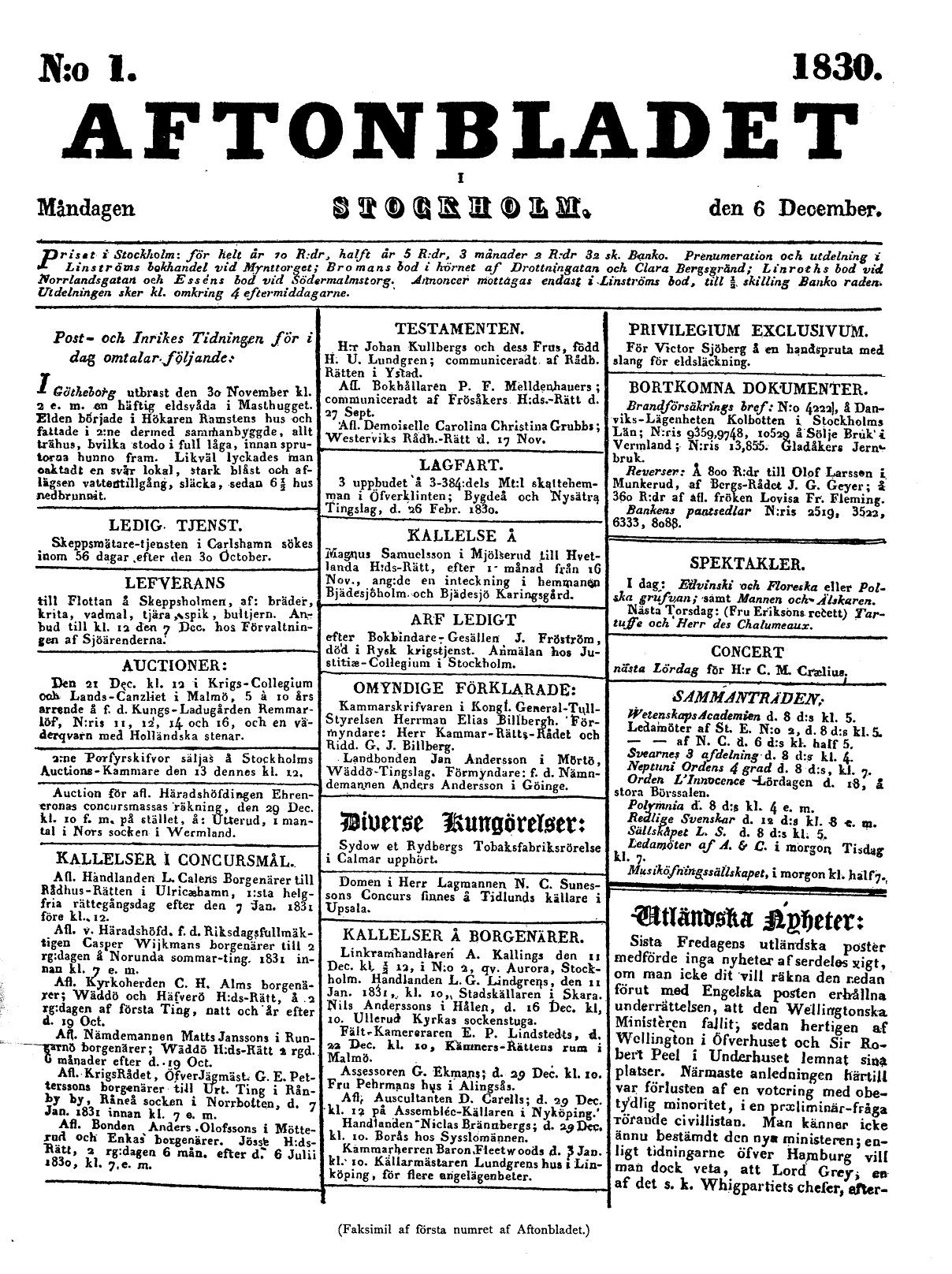
The first page of the first issue of Aftonbladet

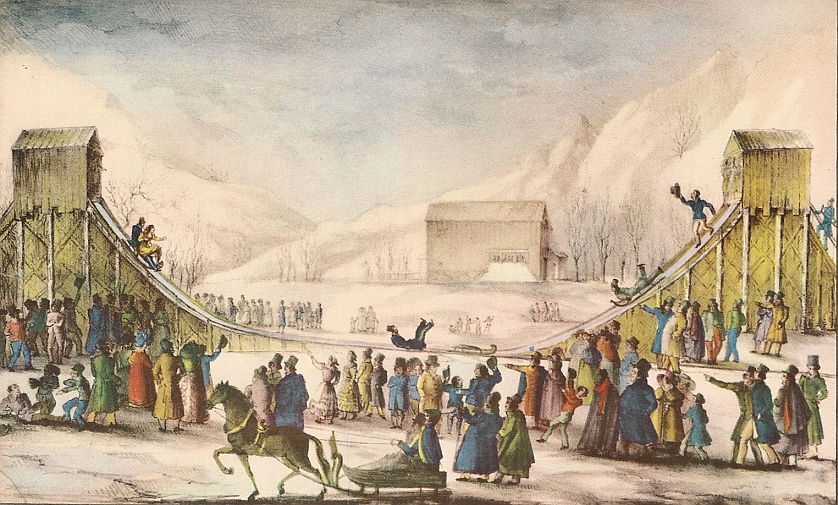
Montagne Russe 1830 Stockholm

Events from the year 1830 in Sweden

== Incumbents ==
- Monarch – Charles XIV John

== Events ==
- December - First issue of Aftonbladet.
- - Royal Swedish Yacht Club is founded
- - Västanfors Church is completed
- - Familjen H*** by Fredrika Bremer
- - Lek och alfwar (part 1) by Johan Anders Wadman
- - Alarik eller Wikingarne by Amelie von Strussenfelt

== Births ==
- 24 April – ⁣Princess Eugenie of Sweden and Norway, princess (died 1889)
- 17 May – Louise Michaëli, opera singer (died 1875)
- 2 September – Josefina Wettergrund, writer (died 1903)
- 25 November – ⁣Karin Åhlin, educator (died 1899)
- - Gumman Strömberg, local profile (died 1894)
- - Aurore von Haxthausen, composer (died 1888)
- - Hilda Sandels, opera singer (died 1921)
