= 1870 in Sweden =

- Decades: 1850s; 1860s; 1870s; 1880s; 1890s
- See also: Other events of 1870; Timeline of Swedish history

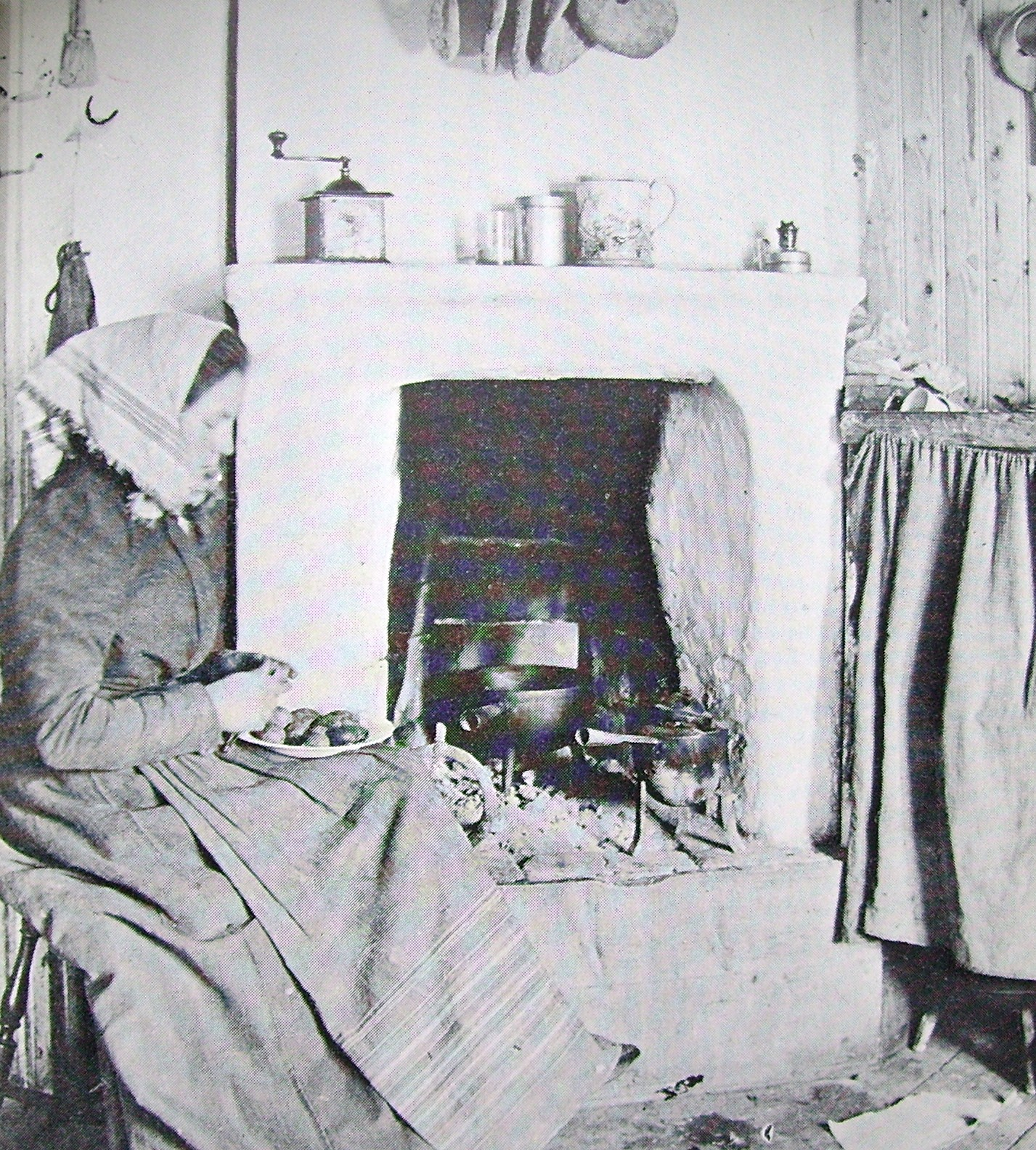

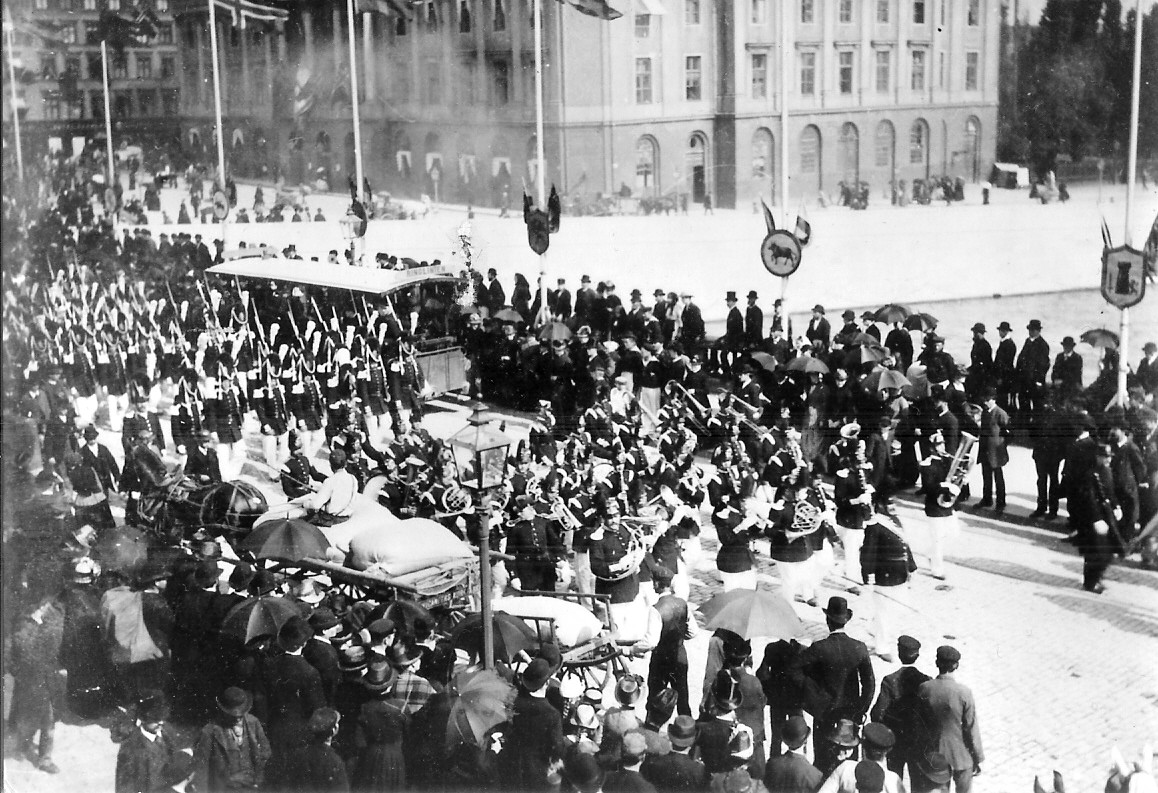
Grenadjärer 1870

Events from the year 1870 in Sweden

== Incumbents ==
- Monarch – Charles XV

== Events ==
- - In accordance with the recommendations of the progressive Girls' School Committee of 1866, the first gymnasium for women is opened (at Wallinska skolan in Stockholm).
- - Universities open to women (at the same terms as men 1873).
- - The first Folk high school open to women is founded by Fredrique Paijkull.
- - The Bukowskis is founded
- - First issue of Sydsvenskan

== Births ==
- 25 January - Helge von Koch, mathematician (died 1924)
- 27 May - Anna Stecksén, pathologist (died 1904)
- 3 April - Agda Östlund, suffragist and social democrat (died 1942)
- 7 April – Anna Lindhagen, politician and social reformer (died 1941)
- 2 October - Hilma Swedahl, gold prospector (died 1965)
- 11 November - Sigfrid Edström, 4th president of the IOC (died 1964)

== Deaths ==
- 28 June – Henrik Reuterdahl, archbishop (born 1795)
