= 1827 in Sweden =

- Years in Sweden: 1824 1825 1826 1827 1828 1829 1830
- Centuries: 18th century · 19th century · 20th century
- Decades: 1790s 1800s 1810s 1820s 1830s 1840s 1850s
- Years: 1824 1825 1826 1827 1828 1829 1830

Events from the year 1827 in Sweden

== Incumbents ==
- Monarch – Charles XIV John

== Events ==
- KTH Royal Institute of Technology is founded.
- Sophie Daguin appointed ballet mistress at the Royal Swedish Ballet.
- 9 June - Norra begravningsplatsen is inaugurated.
- Creation of the Norrlands nation.
- Foundation of Sällskapet för uppmuntran av öm och sedlig modersvård.

== Births ==
- 31 May - Zelma Hedin, stage actress (died 1874)
- 1 May – Agnes Börjesson, painter (died 1900)
- 22 August - Emil von Qvanten, poet, librarian, publisher and politician (died 1903)
- 8 September - Hilda Elfving, educator (died 1906)
- Emma Schenson, photographer (died 1913)

== Deaths ==
- Carl Adolph Grevesmühl, businessperson (born 1744)
