= Ramstedt =

Ramstedt may refer to:

- Ramstedt, Germany, a municipality in Schleswig-Holstein, Germany
- Ramstedt's operation or pyloromyotomy, a surgical procedure

== People ==
- Eva Ramstedt (1879–1974), Swedish physicist who worked with Marie Curie and Ellen Gleditsch, daughter of Johan Ramstedt
- Gustaf John Ramstedt (1873–1950), Finnish linguist specialising in Altaic languages
- Johan Ramstedt (1852–1935), Swedish politician, father of Eva Ramstedt
- Conrad Ramstedt (1867–1963), German surgeon

== See also ==
- Römstedt, a municipality in Lower Saxony, Germany
