= 1905 in Sweden =

- Decades: 1880s; 1890s; 1900s; 1910s; 1920s
- See also: Other events of 1905; Timeline of Swedish history

Events from the year 1905 in Sweden

== Incumbents ==
- Monarch – Oscar II
- Prime Minister –
  - until April 13: Erik Gustaf Boström
  - April 13-August 2: Johan Ramstedt
  - August 2-November 7: Christian Lundeberg
  - starting November 7: Karl Staaff

== Events ==
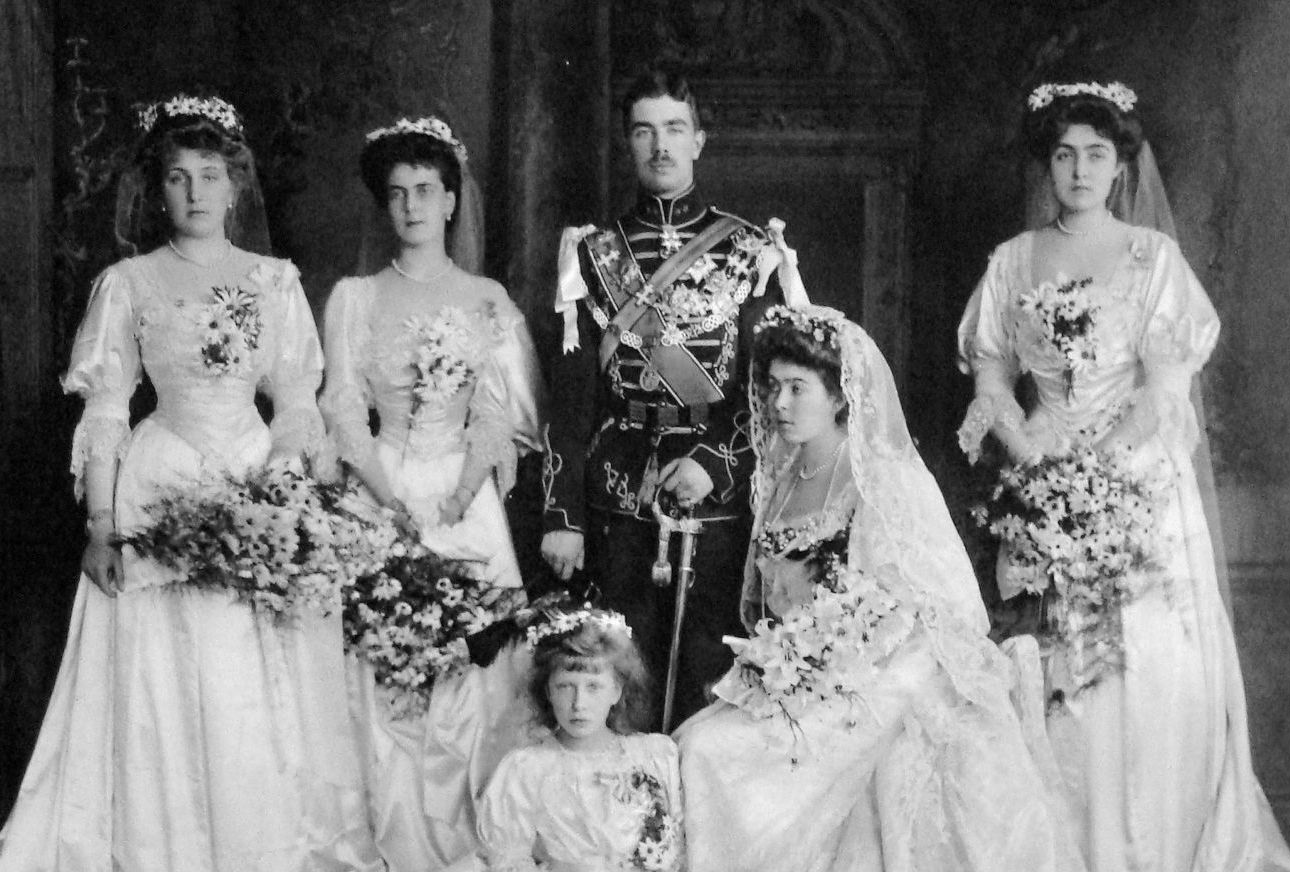
Wedding of Prince Gustaf Adolf and Princess Margaret in 1905.

- February 4–12 – The Nordic Games take place in Stockholm.
- April 14 – Erik Gustaf Boström resigns as the prime minister of Sweden, over the issue of the Swedish- Norwegian Union. His minister without portfolio, Johan Ramstedt, becomes the new prime minister of Sweden.
- June 7 – The Norwegian Parliament declares the union with Sweden dissolved, and Norway achieves full independence.
- June 15 – Princess Margaret of Connaught marries Prince Gustaf Adolf of Sweden, Duke of Skåne (Gustaf VI Adolf of Sweden).
- August 2 – The businessman and right-wing politician Christian Lundeberg becomes Prime Minister of Sweden.
- August 7 – King Oscar II appoints Prince Gustaf to serve as his regent.
- October 26 – Sweden agrees to the repeal of the union with Norway.
- November 7 – The lawyer and liberal politician Karl Staaff becomes Prime Minister of Sweden, after an Riksdag election based mainly about, voting rights reform.
- November 8 – Foundation of the Women's Cooperative Swedish Home by Anna Whitlock in Stockholm.

== Births ==
- 14 January – Sven Rydell, football player (died 1975)
- 3 February – Arne Beurling, mathematician
- 7 February – Ulf von Euler, physiologist
- 1 April – Torsten Nilsson, social democrat
- 27 May – Signe Johansson-Engdahl, Olympic diver (died 2010)
- 17 November - Astrid of Sweden, princess of Sweden; later queen of the Belgians.

== Deaths ==
- 16 April – Thérèse Elfforss, actress (born 1823)
- – Emily Nonnen, writer (born 1812)
- December – Martin Wiberg, inventor (born 1826)
- – Hjalmar Stolpe, entomologist, archaeologist, and ethnographer (born 1841)
