= 1836 in Sweden =

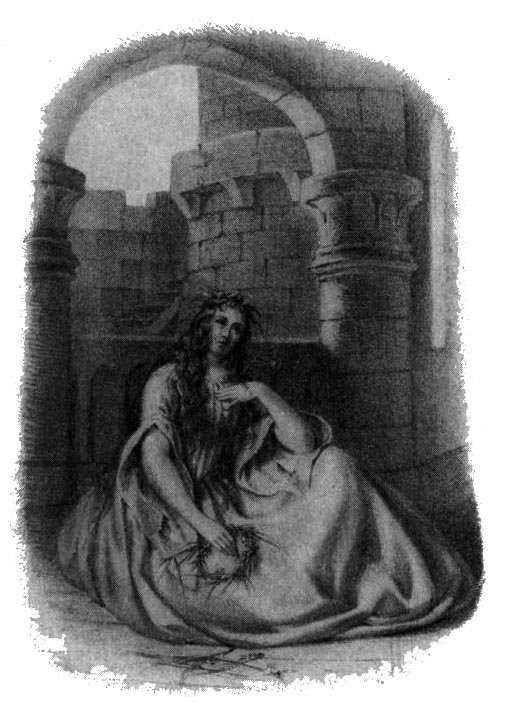
Ofelia, a painting depicting the character Ophelia from Shakespeare's Halmet, a popular subject among Swedish Romantic artists of the 1830s

Events from the year 1836 in Sweden

== Incumbents ==
- Monarch – Charles XIV John

== Events ==
- The liberal opposition in Sweden continued to grow in influence under King Charles XIV John, who pursued a strictly conservative policy exploiting the powers invested in him by the constitution.
- Lars Johan Hierta continued editing Aftonbladet, established in 1830 as Sweden's leading journal of liberal opposition.

== Births ==
- 21 March – Bertha Tammelin, operatic mezzo-soprano (died 1915)
- 24 March – Eufrosyne Abrahamson, Swedish soprano (died 1869)
- 12 October - Lars Olsson Smith, politician and manufacturer (died 1913)
- 22 September - Fredrique Paijkull, educational reformer (died 1899)
- Hilda Caselli, educational reformer (died 1903)
- Therese Kamph, educational reformer (died 1884)

== Deaths ==
- 28 February - Aurora Liljenroth, scholar (born 1772)
- 6 March - Henriette Löfman, composer (born 1784)
- 2 December – Carl von Rosenstein, archbishop (born 1766)
- Caroline Gother, banker (born 1761)
