= 1761 in Sweden =

- Years in Sweden: 1758 1759 1760 1761 1762 1763 1764
- Centuries: 17th century · 18th century · 19th century
- Decades: 1730s 1740s 1750s 1760s 1770s 1780s 1790s
- Years: 1758 1759 1760 1761 1762 1763 1764

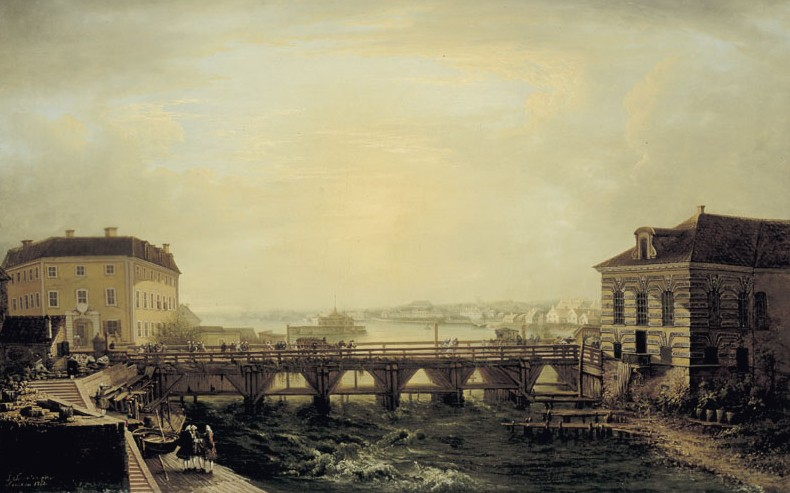
Norrbro 1761

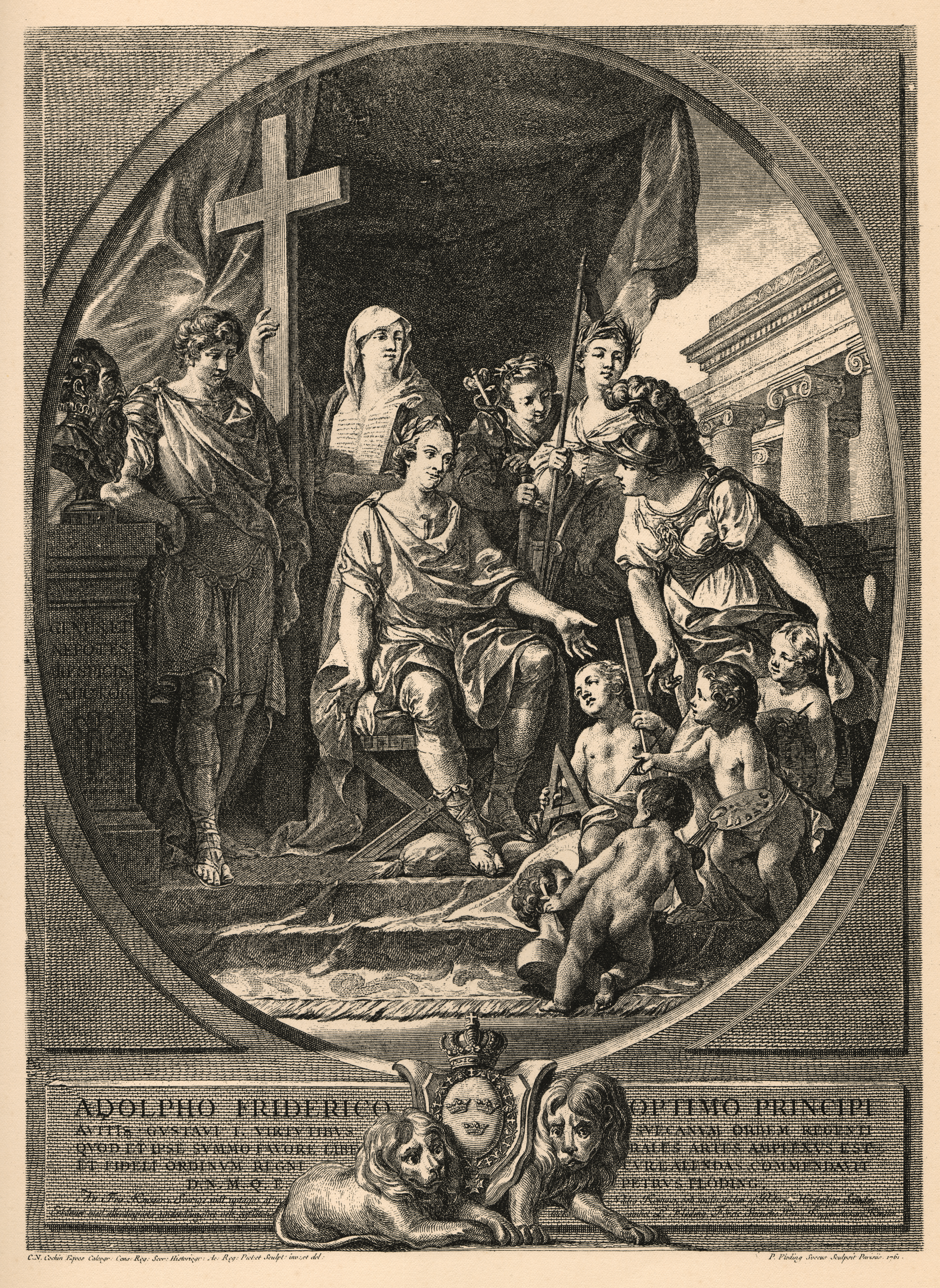
King Adolf Frederick

Events from the year 1761 in Sweden

== Incumbents ==
- Monarch – Adolf Frederick

== Events ==
- 5 February – Anders Johan von Höpken steps down as President of the Privy Council Chancellery.
- 10 April – Claes Ekeblad appointed Privy Council Chancellery.
- - Axel von Fersen the Elder becomes leader of the Hats (party), and issue negotiations with Queen Louisa Ulrika to bring about the end of Sweden's involvement in the war through mediation with her brother Frederick the Great.
- - Catherine Charlotte De la Gardie is officially awarded with a medal for having prevented a witch trial.

== Births ==
- Caroline Gother, banker (died 1836)
- 29 November - Hedvig Ulrika De la Gardie, courtier (died 1832)

== Deaths ==
- 2 June - Jonas Alströmer, pioneer of agriculture and industry (born 1685)
- Cecilia Elisabeth Würzer, singer
