= 1908 in Sweden =

- Decades: 1880s; 1890s; 1900s; 1910s; 1920s
- See also: Other events of 1908; Timeline of Swedish history

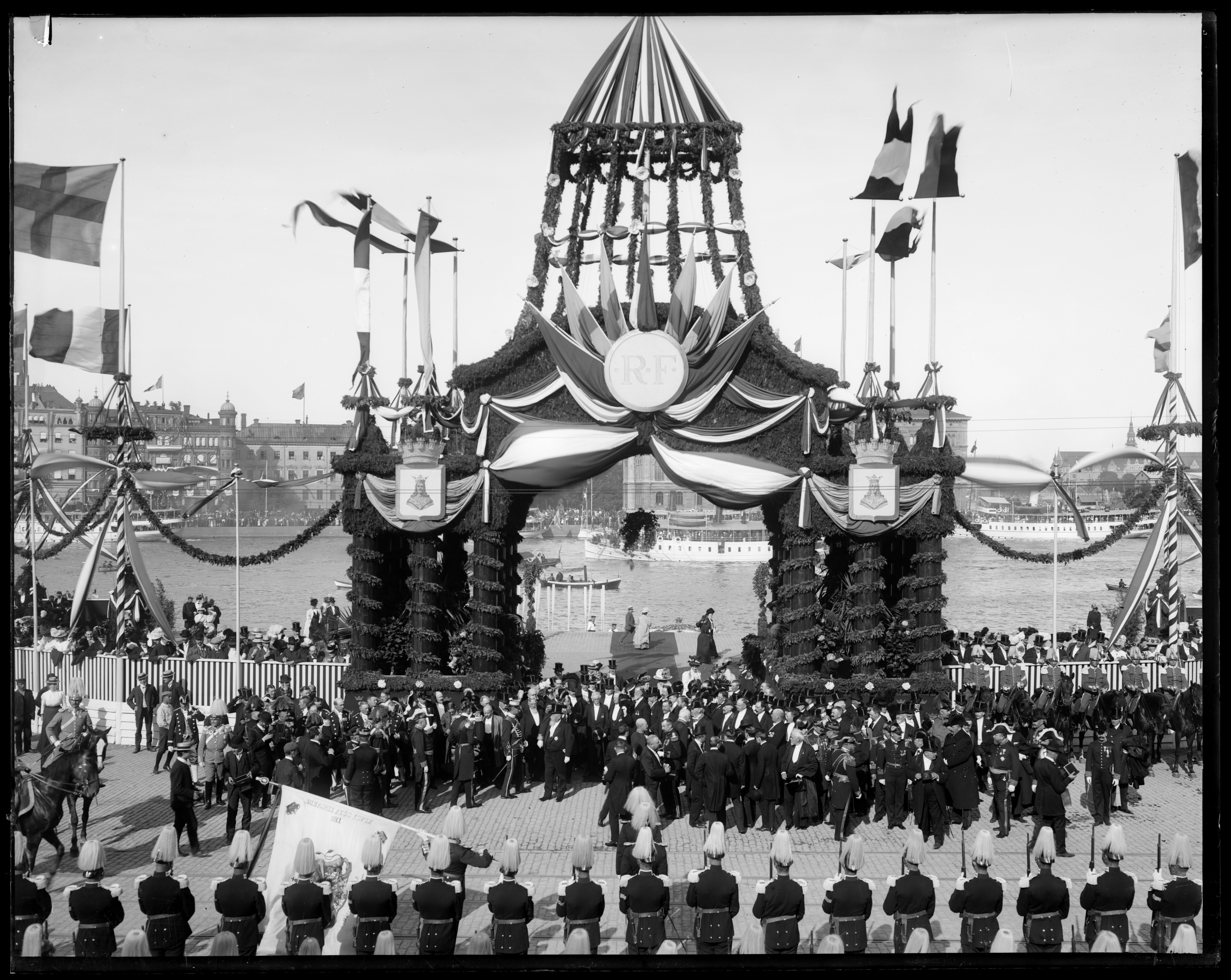

Events from the year 1908 in Sweden

== Incumbents ==
- Monarch – Gustaf V
- Prime Minister - Arvid Lindman

== Events ==
- 18 February - Inauguration of the new building of the Royal Dramatic Theatre.
- 11 December - The Swedish Cross-Country Skiing Association is founded in Sundsvall.
- - First female psychiatrist: Alfhild Tamm
- - The first women are employed in the Swedish Police Authority.
- - Karolina Olsson awakes from 32 years of hibernation.
- July 12 - Bombing of Amalthea Harbour
- The Dramaten (Royal Dramatic Theater) gets its own dedicated building

== Births ==
- 21 January – Bengt Strömgren, astronomer (died 1987)
- 26 January - Gideon Ståhlberg, chess grandmaster (died 1967)
- 30 May - Hannes Alfven, Plasma physicist and Nobe lprize winner (died 1995)

== Deaths ==
  - Amalia Planck, entrepreneur (born 1834)
- 8 June - Frans Hedberg, dramatist (born 1828)
