= 1910 in Sweden =

- Decades: 1890s; 1900s; 1910s; 1920s; 1930s
- See also: Other events of 1910; Timeline of Swedish history

== Population ==
The population that year was 5,522,403. There was a total of 135,625 births in 1910. The death total was 77,212. 8,142 legal immigrations were recorded. 27,816 emigrations happened that year.

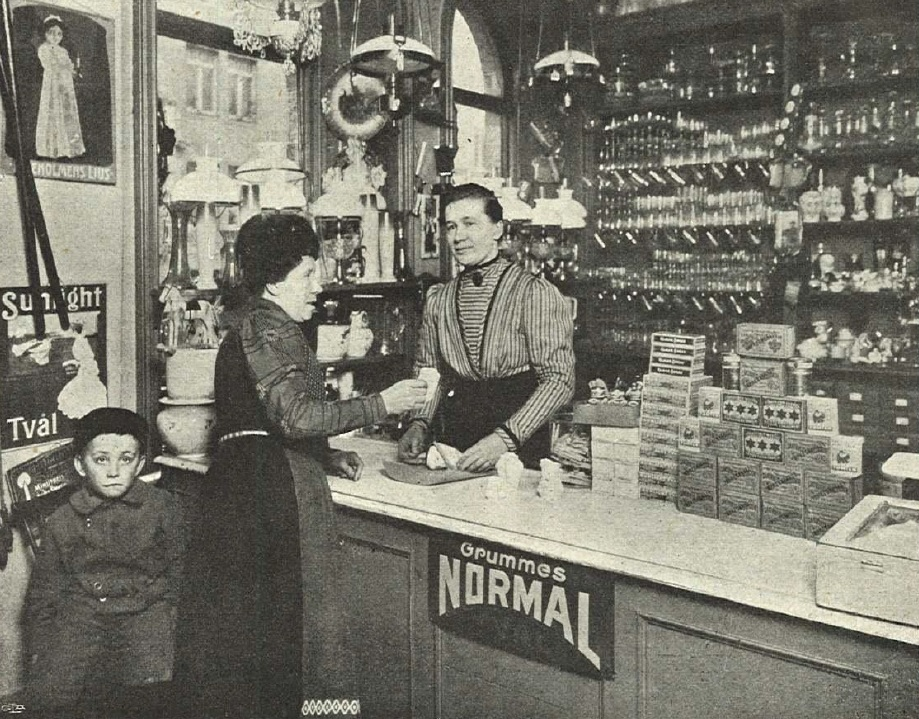
Gertrud Månsson in her shop, Idun (magazine), 3 April 1910

== Incumbents ==
Monarch – Gustaf V Prime Minister - Arvid Lindman

== Events ==
=== January ===
23 January - The Swedish Municipal Workers' Union is founded.

=== April ===
April - The "Strindbergsfejden" (Strindberg Feud) begins when August Strindberg launches newspaper attacks against conservative cultural symbols. 26 April - The Swedish Parliament votes to electrify the Iron Ore Line, initiating the world's first major railway electrification project.

=== May ===
May - Hilma Borelius becomes the first woman to complete a doctorate at Lund University, defending her thesis on writer Erik Gustaf Geijer.

=== June ===
June - The Church of Sweden Huskvarna Church in Huskvarna, Sweden is inaugurated.

=== October ===
16 October - IFK Göteborg wins the Svenska Mästerskapet (Swedish football championship), defeating Djurgårdens IF 3-0 in the final.

=== November ===
November - Sweden grants official recognition to the newly established Portuguese Republic. November - Secret military discussions occur between Swedish Chief of Staff Knut Bildt and German Chief of Staff Helmuth von Moltke the Younger. 2 November - Agreement signed for construction of the Olympic Stadium for the 1912 Summer Olympics. 18 November - Official invitations issued to 27 countries for the 1912 Stockholm Olympics.

- November 23 – Murderer Johan Alfred Ander becomes the last person to be executed in Sweden.

=== December ===
December - Industrial lockouts from the 1909 Swedish general strike finally end after affecting clothing, cellulose, road construction, sawmill, and textile industries. 10 December - Nobel Prize ceremony awards prizes to Paul Heyse (Literature), Johannes Diderik van der Waals (Physics), and Albrecht Kossel (Medicine).

=== Date unknown ===
Foundation of the Karolinska förbundet. Svenska Vitterhetssamfundet is founded. Publication of Elin Wägner's Pennskaftet, known as the first Swedish suffrage novel. Wilhelm Peterson-Berger's opera Arnljot premieres at the Royal Theatre. Strindberg's Intimate Theatre goes bankrupt after staging 25 plays since 1907. 40 women elected to municipal councils in the 1910-11 elections, the first time women could serve in these positions. Construction begins on the Porjus hydroelectric power plant.

== Politics and government ==
Prime Minister Arvid Lindman's conservative government, representing the General Electoral Union, continued implementing the 1909 suffrage reform that had extended voting rights to all men aged 24 and above. This prepared Sweden for its first election with universal male suffrage scheduled for September 1911. The Swedish Trade Union Confederation (LO) suffered a 50% membership decline following the failed 1909 General Strike, though union density would recover to 31% by 1920.

== Economy ==
Sweden's economy maintained approximately 2% annual GDP per capita growth during the 1870-1910 period. By 1910, Sweden had imported around 3.4 billion SEK in foreign capital since 1850 to finance industrialization. Major industrial companies active in 1910 included:

SKF (founded 1907, employing 325 people) ASEA (electrical equipment) LM Ericsson (telecommunications) Alfa Laval (centrifugal separators)

The country maintained the gold standard introduced in 1873 and participated in the Scandinavian Monetary Union with Denmark and Norway.

== Culture ==
The year marked the birth of Swedish Literary Modernism. The "Strindbergsfejden" (Strindberg Feud) generated approximately 1,000 articles across 80 newspapers over two years. Gertrud Månsson became the first woman elected to a municipal council. The National Association for Women's Suffrage continued campaigning with support from Selma Lagerlöf and Elin Wägner.

== Science and Technology ==
Svante Arrhenius became a Foreign Member of the Royal Society in 1910. The Parliament's decision to electrify the Malmbanan initiated Sweden's transition from coal dependence to hydroelectric power, with the Porjus power plant designed to provide electricity for both railway operations and the LKAB mines in Kiruna and Malmberget.

== Sports ==
IFK Göteborg won the Swedish football championship Örgryte IS won the inaugural Svenska Serien league championship First Swedish Cross-Country Skiing Championships held in Härnösand Greta Johansson won the Swedish women's breaststroke championship Sweden formed its first baseball club, Vesterås Baseball Club, for Olympic demonstration purposes

== Births ==
- 18 January – Roland Svensson, artist (died 2003)
- 5 April – Sven Andersson, politician, Minister of Defence 1957-1973 (died 1987)
- 28 June – Ingrid Luterkort, actress and stage director (died 2011)
- 15 October – Torbjörn Caspersson, biologist, pioneer of DNA research (died 1997)
- 4 November – Agda Rössel, politician and diplomat (died 2001)

== Deaths ==
- 18 February – Johanna Sundberg, ballerina (born 1828)
- 9 March – Fredrik von Otter, Prime Minister 1900-1902 (born 1833)
- 17 November – Sigrid Sparre, courtier (born 1825)
- Maria Ribbing, schoolteacher and philanthropist (born 1842)

== See also ==
- 1909 Swedish general strike
- 1912 Summer Olympics
- History of Sweden
- Industrialization in Sweden
