= 1909 in Sweden =

- Decades: 1880s; 1890s; 1900s; 1910s; 1920s
- See also: Other events of 1909; Timeline of Swedish history

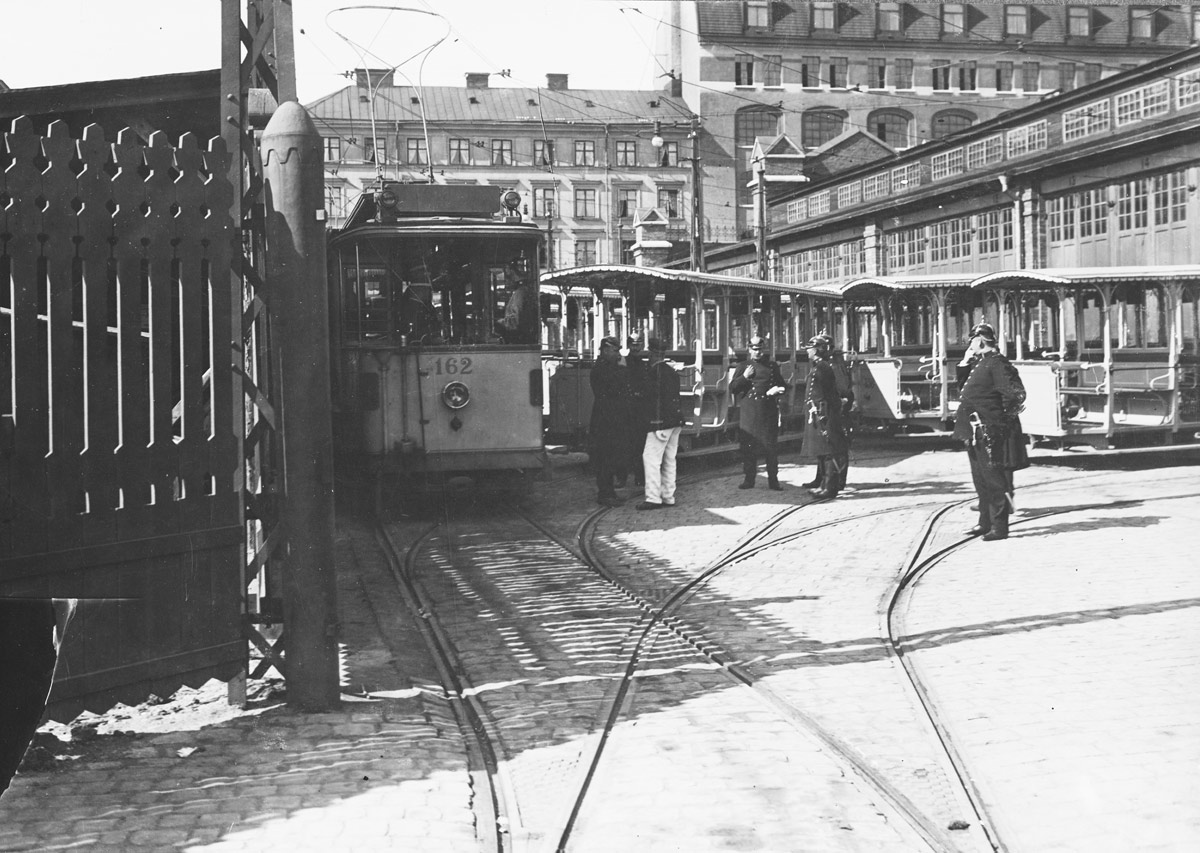
Police officers guard streetcars during the general strike.

Events from the year 1909 in Sweden

== Incumbents ==
- Monarch – Gustaf V
- Prime Minister - Arvid Lindman

== Events ==
- 6–14 February – The Nordic Games take place in Stockholm.
- 4 August to 4 September – Swedish General Strike (The Great Strike of 1909)
  - Introduction of the 8-hour day at the end of 1910s
- 10 December – Selma Lagerlöf becomes the first woman to be given the Nobel Prize in Literature.
- The right for women to vote in municipal elections are extended to include married women, and women are made eligible to municipal councils.
- The phrase "Swedish man" is removed from the application forms to public offices and women are thereby approved as applicants to most public professions.

== Births ==
- 12 January – Barbro Alving, reporter (died 1987)
- 21 March – Miff Görling, bandleader, trombonist, arranger, and composer (died 1988).
- 20 July – Sigfrid Heyner, Olympic swimmer (died 1995)

== Deaths ==
- 1 January – Ivar Arosenius, painter (born 1878)
- Elsa Borg, social worker (born 1826)
- Hanna Hammarström, industrialist (born 1829)
