= Ivar Afzelius =

Swedish jurist and politician (1848–1921)

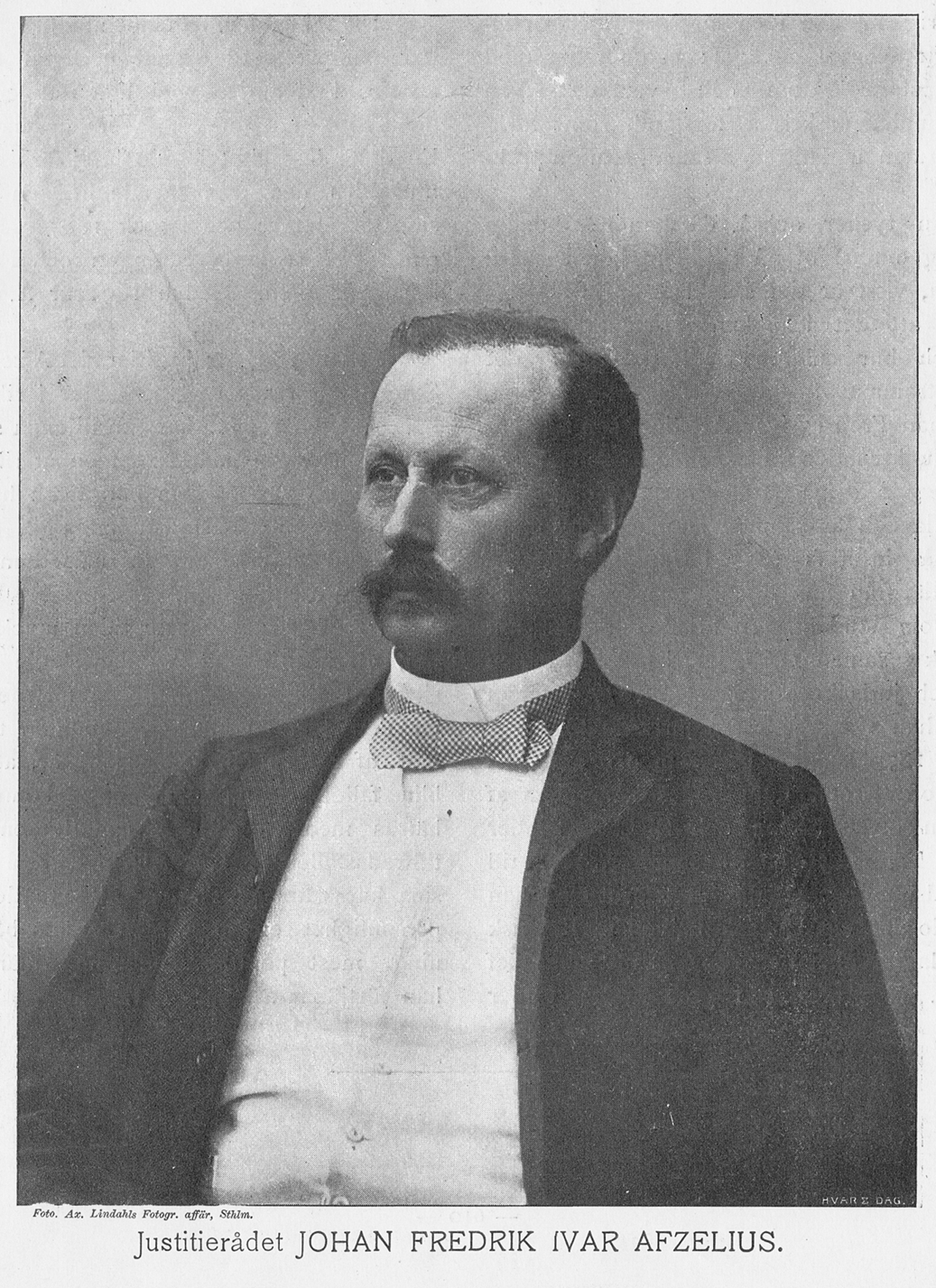
- Afzelius as Justice of the Supreme Court.
- Born: Johan Fredrik Ivar Afzelius; October 15, 1848; Uppsala, Sweden
- Died: October 30, 1921 (aged 73); Stockholm, Sweden
- Burial place: Uppsala Old Cemetery, Sweden
- Education: Uppsala Högre Elementarläroverk (University Entrance Examination, 1867); Uppsala University (Juris Utriusque Kandidat, 1871; Juris Utriusque Doktor, 1876)
- Occupations: Member of Parliament, Professor, Lawyer
- Years active: 1878–1917
- Political party: Moderate Party
- Board member of: Supreme Court of Sweden; Swedish Academy; Maritime Law Committee; Law Commission

Johan Fredrik Ivar Afzelius (15 October 1848 – 30 October 1921) was a Swedish jurist and politician.

== Early life and education ==
Afzelius was born 15 October 1848 in Uppsala into an academic family. He was the son of philosopher Fredrik Georg Afzelius and the grandson of the legal reformer Johan Gabriel Richert. Afzelius received his university entrance examination in 1867 and enrolled at Uppsala University the same year. He became a candidate of law (juris utriusque kandidat) in 1873. After completing his licentiate degree, he was awarded a doctorate in law (juris utriusque doktor) in 1877.

During his doctorate, he spent a year at the universities of Leipzig and Göttingen (1874–1875). In Leipzig, he studied under the Roman law scholar Bernhard Windscheid, whose logical and systematic methods profoundly shaped Afzelius's later legal thinking.

== Career ==
=== Legal and academic career ===
In 1878, Afzelius became a deputy district judge. Afzelius began his career as a docent and later an extraordinary professor of procedural law at Uppsala University (1879). In 1891, he was appointed a Justice of the Supreme Court (justitieråd), a position he held until 1902. From 1910 to 1918, he was the president of the Svea Court of Appeal. Internationally, he was a member of the Permanent Court of Arbitration in The Hague starting in 1905. He was made a member of the Royal Swedish Academy of Sciences in 1905, and of the Swedish Academy in 1907, on seat 4. Afzelius was a member of the men's association Sällskapet Idun.

Afzelius assisted the New Law Commission (Nya lagberedningen) starting in 1880 on the reform of the Code of Judicial Procedure and served as a member of the Maritime Law Committee (1882–1887). Afzelius was involved in standardising legislation across the Nordic countries. He contributed to the 1891 Maritime Law (Sjölagen) and authored a widely used commentary on the act, which reached its tenth edition by 1917.

As chairman of the Law Commission (Lagberedningen) from 1902 to 1909, Afzelius oversaw the drafting of a new Land Code (Jordabalken). While the draft was not enacted in its entirety at the time, parts of the proposal were adopted as separate legislation, including the 1907 law on usufruct (nyttjanderätt) and the 1912 regulations on the execution of real property. Erik Thyselius details that Afzelius applied Roman legal methods to domestic Swedish law. He advocated for "simple and comprehensible" legal language, distancing his work from the more abstract technicality of the contemporary German Bürgerliches Gesetzbuch.

=== Political career ===
Afzelius was a member of the First Chamber of the Riksdag from 1898 to 1903 and again from 1905 to 1915, representing the Moderate Party. He served as the Speaker of the First Chamber between 1912 and 1915.

Politically, Afzelius had a moderate-conservative position. He supported the introduction of universal suffrage in 1909 and the implementation of proportional representation. He was an opponent of the 1908 proposal for a "birching law" (corporal punishment), arguing that such methods were incompatible with a democracy. He also advocated for improved legal rights for the incarcerated and the inheritance rights of children born out of wedlock

== Personal life ==
Ivar Afzelius was the son of Fredrik Afzelius and Edla Richert, and the grandson of Johan Gabriel Richert. Ivar Afzelius married Anna Sofia Gabriella Richert (1862–1930) in 1883; she was the daughter of Janne Richert and Anna Granfelt. The Afzelius' had five children: Ellen Tiselius, Axel Afzelius, artist Märta Afzelius, librarian Ingrid Afzelius (1890–1976), and Sven Afzelius. He died on 30 October 1921 and is buried at the Uppsala Old Cemetery.

Political offices
Preceded by Christian Lundeberg	Speaker of the Riksdag; 1912–1915	Succeeded by Hugo Hamilton
Cultural offices
Preceded by Claes Herman Rundgren	Swedish Academy, Seat No.4; 1907–21	Succeeded by Tor Hedberg
