= 1907 in Sweden =

- Decades: 1880s; 1890s; 1900s; 1910s; 1920s
- See also: Other events of 1907; Timeline of Swedish history

Events from the year 1907 in Sweden

== Incumbents ==
- Monarch – Oscar II (until December 8), Gustaf V (starting December 8)
- Prime Minister – Arvid Lindman

== Events ==
- 23 January - Sweden's record highest atmospheric pressure value occurs in Kalmar and Visby at 1063.7 hPa.
- 11 March - SKF is founded.
- 8 December – King Oscar II dies and is succeeded by his eldest son, Gustaf V.
- Swedish Emigration Commission

== Births ==
- 14 March – Björn-Erik Höijer, writer (died 1996)
- 15 March – Zarah Leander, actress (died 1981)
- 11 April - Nancy Eriksson, social democrat (died 1984)
- 21 July - Georg Rydeberg, actor (died 1983)
- 14 November – Astrid Lindgren, author of Pippi Longstocking (died 2002)

== Deaths ==
- 21 February – Erik Gustaf Boström, prime minister
- 7 March – Charlotta Raa-Winterhjelm, actress and drama teacher (born 1838)
- 30 March – Aurora von Qvanten, writer and artist (born 1816)
- 8 December – Oscar II of Sweden, monarch
- 28 December – Louise Granberg, playwright and theater director
