= 1911 in Sweden =

- Decades: 1890s; 1900s; 1910s; 1920s; 1930s
- See also: Other events of 1911; Timeline of Swedish history

Events from the year 1911 in Sweden.

== Incumbents ==
- Monarch – Gustaf V
- Prime Minister - Arvid Lindman, Karl Staaff

== Events ==
- 27 April – The film Stockholmsfrestelser by Anna Hofman-Uddgren, the first movie by a female director in Sweden.
- 11 June – The Sixth Conference of the International Woman Suffrage Alliance is held in Stockholm.
- 3-24 September - The first election with universal suffrage for men.
- 7 October – Liberal leader Karl Staaff returns as Prime Minister of Sweden after a Riksdag election victory based on the promises of defense cuts and social reforms.
  - 1911 Liberal policy focused on decrease in military expenditure. This led to conflict between Staaf and King Gustav V.
- Date unknown – The Swedish Cross-Country Skiing Association is renamed the Swedish Ski Association.
- Date unknown - Start of the Swedish intervention in Persia.

== Births ==
- 15 January – Gösta Bohman, politician (died 1997)
- 5 February - Jussi Björling, operatic tenor (died 1960)

== Deaths ==
- 28 January – Wilhelmina Fundin, operatic soprano (died 1819)
- 8 February – Gustaf Fröding, poet and writer (born 1860)
- 10 March - Elsa Eschelsson, first woman to finish a Doctor of Laws (born 1861)
- 8 May - Rosalie Fougelberg, dentist (born 1841)
- 7 October - Hilda Lund, ballerina (born 1840)
