= Christian Lundeberg =

Prime minister of Sweden in 1905

His Excellency Christian Lundeberg
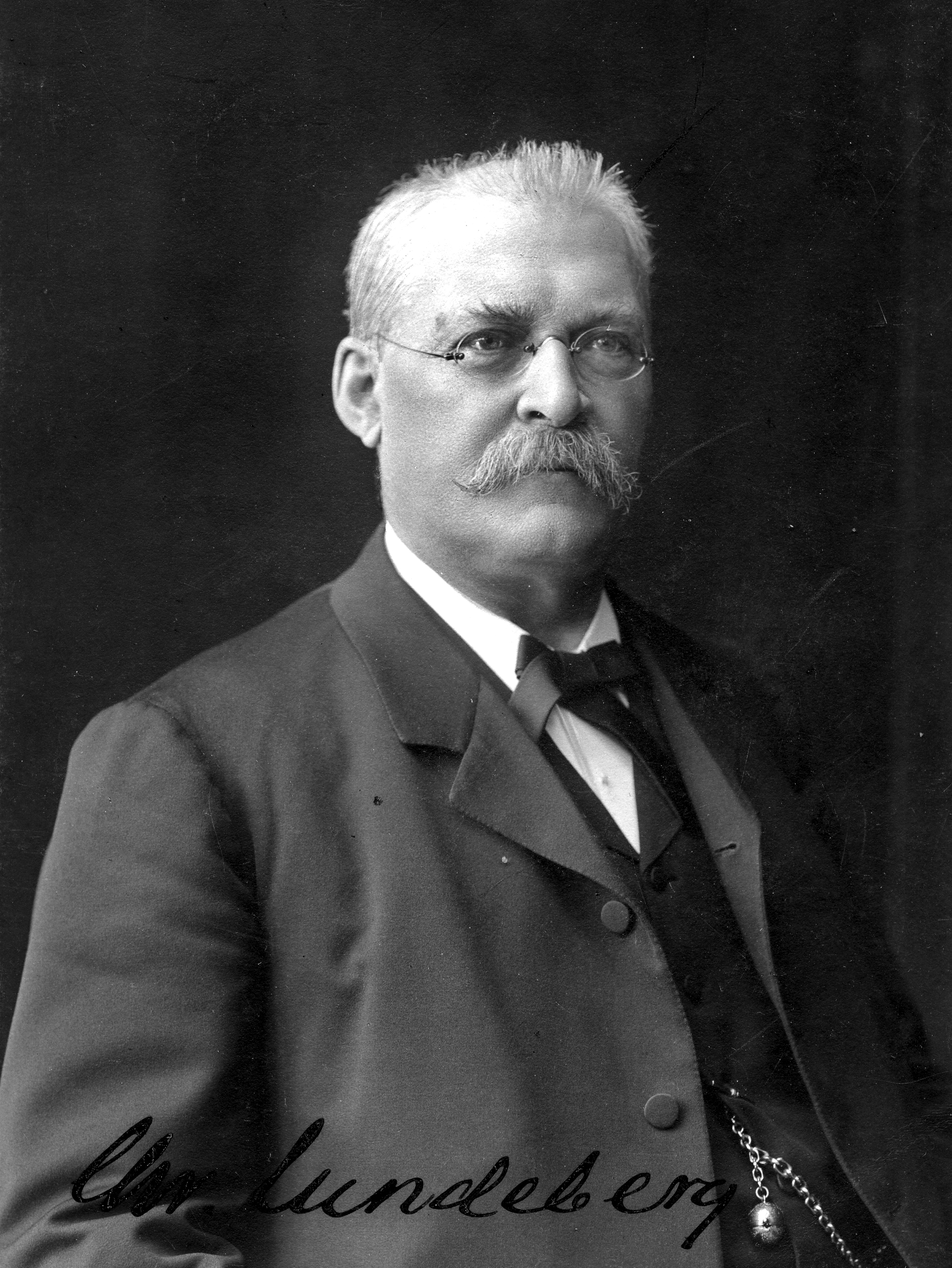
- Lundeberg in 1905

Prime Minister of Sweden
- In office 2 August 1905 – 7 November 1905
- Monarch: Oscar II
- Preceded by: Johan Ramstedt
- Succeeded by: Karl Staaff

Personal details
- Born: Christian Lundeberg; 14 July 1842 Forsbacka, Sweden
- Died: 10 November 1911 (aged 69) Stockholm, Sweden
- Party: Protectionist Party
- Spouse: Anna Elfbrink (m. 1865)
- Children: 6

Christian Lundeberg (14 July 1842 – 10 November 1911) was a Swedish statesman and military officer who served as Prime Minister of Sweden from August to November 1905. He led the Protectionist Party from 1900 to 1908 and represented Gävleborg in the Riksdag from 1886 to 1911. He also served as Speaker of the First Chamber from 1909 until his death. He led the coalition government responsible for successfully negotiating the peaceful dissolution of the union with Norway, helping to secure a constitutional settlement between the two kingdoms.

== Biography ==
Lundeberg was born in Forsbacka, Gävleborg County, on 14 July 1842. He was the son of Johan Ulrik August Lundeberg, a mill owner, and Maria Benjamina Eckman. He studied at Ultuna and at a military school, and was a Löjtnant (roughly equivalent to lieutenant) from 1861 to 1874, after which he left the military service. He worked at the iron works at Forsbacka bruk, where he was CEO from 1885 to 1906.

He was a member of the First Chamber of Parliament for the conservative and protectionist party, and became its leader in 1899.

Lundeberg was a leading figure during the parliamentary discussions regarding the union between Sweden and Norway. He was the chairman of a committee that was critical of, and eventually lead to the demise of Johan Ramstedt's government. In June 1905, the King appointed Lundeberg to create a government. He created a coalition government that in September 1905 reached an agreement which allowed Norway to hold a referendum for, or against, independence from Sweden.

Following the resolution of the Union Crisis, Lundeberg tried to find a mandate to continue with the coalition government in order to resolve the issue of suffrage. When his attempt failed, he went back to being a member of parliament, and was a speaker in the First Chamber of Parliament from 1909 until his death in 1911.

Political offices
Preceded by Johan Ramstedt	Prime Minister of Sweden; August – November 1905	Succeeded by Karl Staaff
Preceded by Gustaf Sparre	Speaker of the Riksdag; 1909–1911	Succeeded by Ivar Afzelius
