= Aurora von Qvanten =

Swedish writer and artist (1816–1907)

- Born: Aurora Magdalena Örnberg; 12 September 1816; Piteå, Norrbotten, Sweden
- Died: 30 March 1907 (aged 90); Stockholm, Sweden
- Occupations: Writer, translator, artist
- Spouse: Emil von Qvanten (m. 1857; died 1903)
- Writing career
- Pen name: Turdus Merula
- Language: Swedish
- Notable works: Tusen och en natt; One Thousand and One Nights

Aurora Magdalena von Qvanten (née Örnberg; 12 September 1816 – 30 March 1907) was a Swedish writer, translator and artist who used the pseudonym Turdus Merula.

== Early and personal life ==
Aurora Magdalena Örnberg was born on 12 September 1816 in Piteå, Norrbotten County to Carl Jacob Örnberg, the town's mayor and a member of parliament and Helena Catharina Degerman. In 1857, she married the much younger Emil von Qvanten, who was a member of a Finnish-Swedish noble family. From 1864 to 1872, he worked as King Charles XV's librarian and was a regular contributor to Stockholm newspapers. The couple had no children.

== Career ==
In 1856, she anonymously released her first two publications, the two-story collections Smått och gott and När och fjerran: roande berättelse för barn från nio till fjorton års ålder, which were both aimed at children aged between 9 and 14 and contained colourful illustrations. von Qvanten also wrote works for adults, such as the novels Rosa Arntson in 1868, Musikerns dotter in 1881 and En roman på landsbygden in 1882, and contributed to magazines including Svenska Familj-journalen and Tidskrift för hemmet. Furthermore, she was known for her translation work, the first of which was published in 1850. Her best known translations were the epic Tusen och en natt and One Thousand and One Nights, the latter of which she translated from a German edition written by Gustav Weil. Additionally she translated A Love Story by George Eliot and Mott och mal by Ouida as well as translating French plays for the Royal Dramatic Theatre in Stockholm. In 1860, her monologue Tanten premiered at the Södra theatre.

Beginning in the 1860s, she began using the pseudonym Turdus Merula, meaning blackbird in Latin. In addition to her writing, she was active as an artist and participated in exhibitions held by the Swedish Women Artist's Association.

The von Qvantens were both engaged in philanthropic causes and social circles. Author and social reformer Fredrika Bremer recalled in her letters how in 1863 Aurora von Qvanten helped organise benefit concerts to support the Polish injured during the January Uprising. von Qvanten also donated the proceeds of her short piece En nyårsafton i Norrland to the underprivileged in Norrbotten.

== Later life and death ==
von Qvanten and her husband lived modestly and over time they became increasingly more isolated. The couple retired to Italy in 1890 due to Emil's increasing health issues, and lived on the island Capri until 1900. However, Aurora struggled with the Southern Italian climate, so they moved north to Sanremo. Emil von Qvanten died there on 5 December 1903. Following his death, Aurora returned to Sweden. She died four years in Stockholm on 30 March 1907, at the age of 90.
