= Helmer Grundström =

Swedish writer (1904–1986)

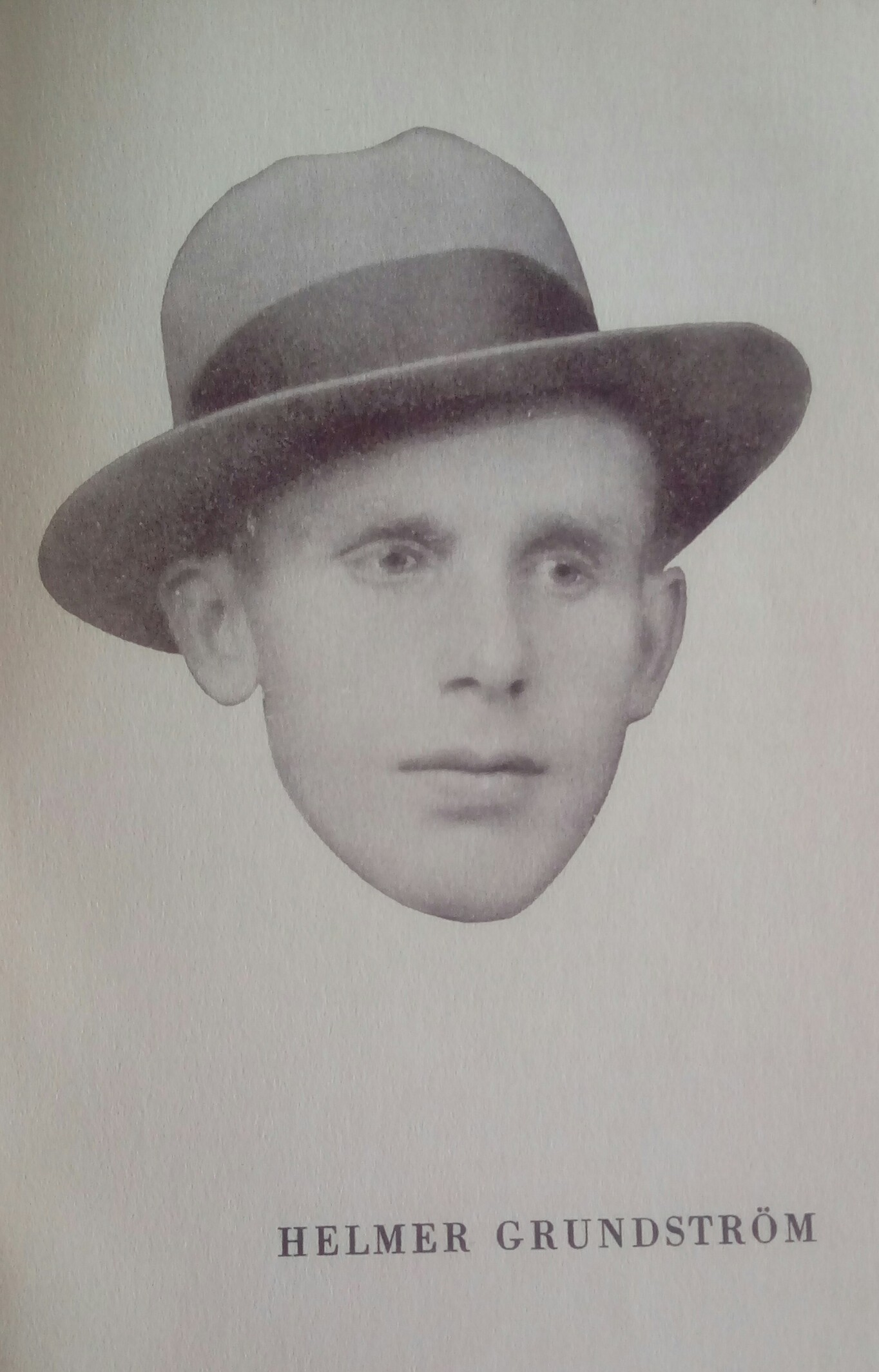
- Helmer Grundström
- Born: 29 February 1904; Bodum, Ångermanland, Sweden
- Died: 29 May 1986 (aged 82); Stockholm, Sweden
- Writing career
- Period: 1929–1980

Helmer Grundström (29 February 1904 – 29 May 1986) was a Swedish writer and poet, born in the village of Svanavattnet in Ångermanland. Grundström was deeply associated with the Swedish workers’ movement and is characterized as a proletarian author.

Some of his poems have been interpreted by Swedish folk singers Thorstein Bergman and Tor Bergner and are featured on the album Langt nol i väla / Dikter av Helmer Grundström, along with poems read by the author himself.
