= 1906 in Sweden =

- Decades: 1880s; 1890s; 1900s; 1910s; 1920s
- See also: Other events of 1906; Timeline of Swedish history

Events from the year 1906 in Sweden

== Incumbents ==
- Monarch – Oscar II
- Prime Minister – Karl Staaff (until May 29), Arvid Lindman (starting May 29)

== Events ==
- Swedish Electricians' Union is founded.
- Swedish Commercial Employees' Union is founded.
- 1906 spelling reform

== Births ==
- 18 January - Nils Axelsson, footballer
- 5 February - Victor Carlund, footballer and football manager
- 3 March - Artur Lundkvist, writer, poet and translator
- 8 March – Victor Hasselblad, inventor
- 17 April - Jan G Waldenstrom, doctor
- 22 April - Prince Gustaf Adolf, prince
- 9 June - Emy Hagman, actress
- 19 June - Knut kroon, footballer
- 21 June - Karin Kavli, actress
- 15 August - Nils Skoglund, diver
- 22 August - Stig Wennerstrom, military officer and spy
- 14 September - Tord stal, actor
- 23 December - Gunner Strang, politician

== Deaths ==
- 28 November – Oskar Andersson, cartoonist (born 1877)
- Hilda Elfving, educator
- Wilhelmina Josephson, pianist
