= Hilma Swedahl =

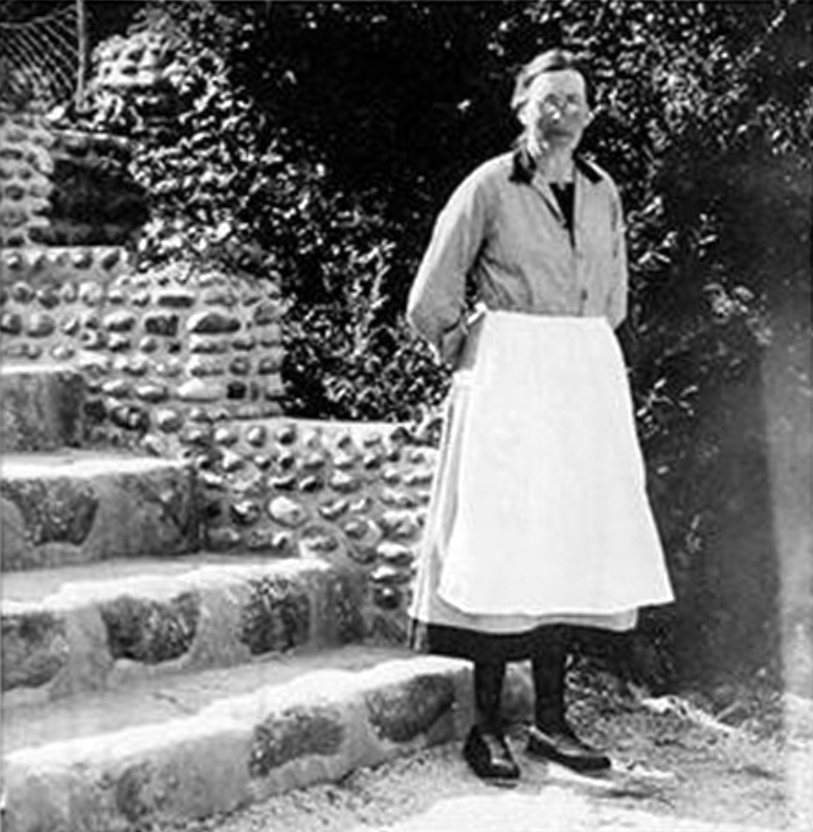
- Hilma Swedahl
- Born: 2 October 1870; Skee church parish
- Died: 2 July 1965 (aged 94); Skee church parish

Hilma Swedahl, née Wounsch (2 October 1870 – 2 July 1965) was a Swedish-American gold prospector and the founder of the Swedish tourist village of Alaska i Strömstad.

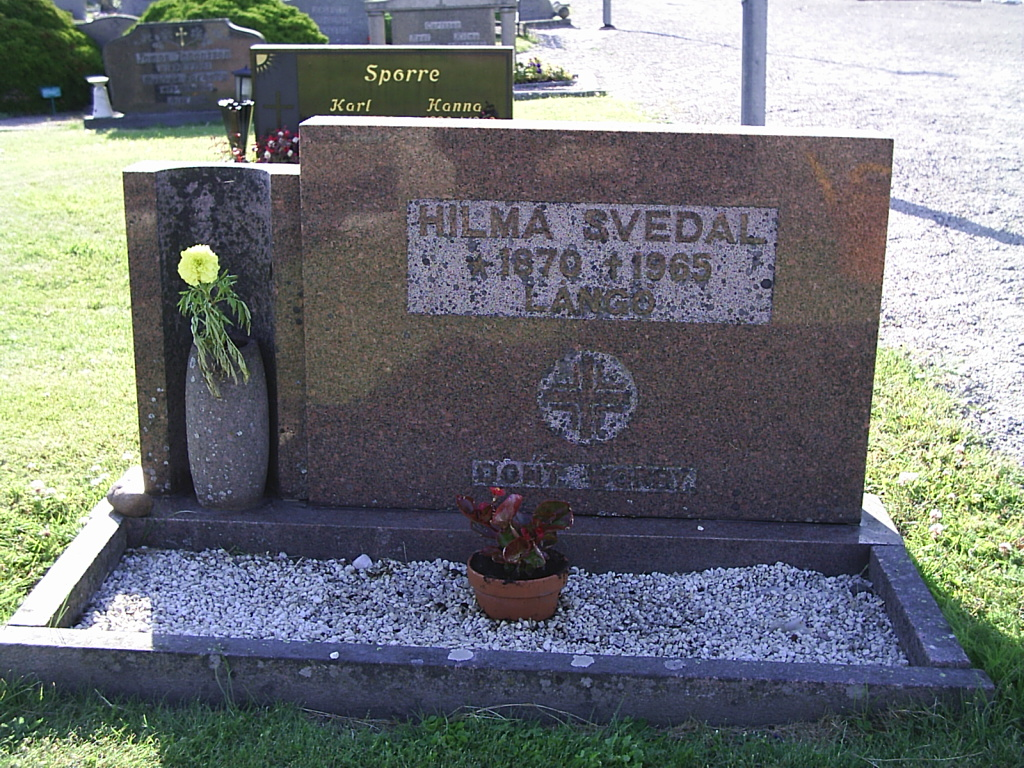
Hilma Swedahl's grave

Hilma Wounsch was born on the island of Syd-Hälsö, Strömstads kommun in Västra Götaland County, Sweden. She was the daughter of a fisher in Bohuslän. During the spring of 1896, she traveled to New York City, where she worked as a domestic. After four years, she left for Alaska and the Klondike Gold Rush. She joined a group of young people in Dawson with whom she reached the gold camp near Ruby, Alaska. She lived alone in the wilderness for fifteen years until she married John Swedahl, a gold prospector originally from Trondheim, Norway. The couple visited Sweden in 1912 and in 1928. After the last visit, Hilma Swedahl remained in Sweden, while her husband returned to the United States. During the 1930s, she founded the Alaska i Strömstad, a park and rock garden located on Norra Långöns naturreservat, an island and nature reserve located in an archipelago northwest of Stromstad. Largely built of stone, this tourist village was inspired by her experience while living in the state of Alaska.

Hilma Swedahl died in 1965 and was buried in the churchyard at Skee church (Skee kyrka) in Strömstad. On her grave stone is carved her saying: "Don´t worry!".

== Other sources ==
- Dave, Göran (2010) I Hilmas fotspår: en resa till Alaska i Strömstad och i USA (Visby: Nomen) ISBN 978-91-7465-133-1
- Jägerbrand, Mikael (2011) Hilmas Alaska: en guidebok (Lysekil: Virvelvind) ISBN 978-91-975331-8-8
