= Amalia Planck =

Swedish entrepreneur

Amalia Planck (1834–1908), was a Swedish entrepreneur.

She was married to the adjunct professor Erik Wilhelm Planck. In 1880, she founded a sausage factory to supplement the family income, which became successful. She is known as the inventor of the sausage "Doktorinnan Plancks korv" ('Doctoress' Planck's Sausage'), which was popular in the charcuteries of Stockholm.
