= Linde Klinckowström-von Rosen =

Swedish baroness and equestrian

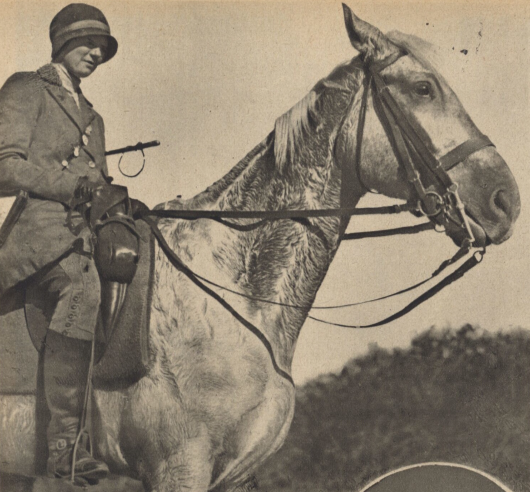
Linde Klinckowström-von Rosen (Pestrý týden magazine, 1928)

Linde Klinckowström-von Rosen (September 1, 1902 – March 26, 2000), was a Swedish baroness, writer and equestrian. She was known for her trips on the horse Castor through Europe, which she made between 1926 and 1940, and which she reported through travelling letters in magazines.

== Biography ==
Linde Klinckowström-von Rosen was the daughter of Baron Axel Klinckowström and his wife, Thyra. She grew up at the Stavsund estate on Ekerö, just outside of Stockholm. Her father, who had gained a PhD and was a lecturer in zoology, left responsibility for the estate garden entirely to Thyra, his independent wife, whilst he focused on bacteriology, research trips, and writing. Linde Klinckowström-von Rosen, along with her siblings Harald and Thora, were all home-educated by a governess. Linde Klinckowström-von Rosen was artistically talented and spent 1921 and 1922 at art schools in Munich and Dresden. She also improved her riding skills and purchased her first show-jumping horse, a mare called Regina. However, an export ban was slapped on the horse as a result of a shortage in breeding mares in Germany following the First World War (see Horses in World War I). Regina was then quickly sold locally and Linde Klinckowström-von Rosen travelled home and purchased Castor. Linde Klinckowström-von Rosen signed up for a riding course with Hans von Rosen at the Swartlingriding school. Hans von Rosen was a newly divorced man who performed operettas when he needed money to provide for his horses. He had also won two Olympic gold medals as part of the Swedish show-jumping team as well as an individual bronze medal in dressage. Linde Klinckowström-von Rosen married Hans von Rosen on 26 November 1933 at Ekerö church where the condition that Castor could also be present was met. The couple settled on Lindö. For a long time Linde Klinckowström-von Rosen longed for and missed the open roads. Despite this she dedicated herself to life on the farm at Lindö with Hans and their two daughters where, amongst other things, she bred horses and went on hunts.

In 1932 she traveled to Rome, and from there to Hungary. On April 18 she reached the city of Nagykanizsa. Days before she was in the castle of Letenye visiting the counts Andrássy. She left the next day to the city of Marcali to visit the counts Pejacsevics, and after that she traveled to Székesfehérvár and then to Budapest where she stayed 5 days. In the middle of June she traveled back to Sweden.

== Bibliography ==
- På långritt med Castor. Stockholm: Geber. 1929. Libris 1333152
- Ritt genom livet. Stockholm: Hökerberg. 1962. Libris 1240991
- Ett hästminne: [långritter genom Europa]. Stockholm: Karlebo. 1990. Libris 7744814. ISBN 91-85026-36-0
- En landsvägsstrykerska berättar: möten och minnen i Europa under 1900-talet. Stockholm: Carlsson. 1998. Libris 7622400. ISBN 91-7203-824-1

== Other sources ==
- Interviews with Linde Klinckowström-von Rosen's daughter Margaretha Reuterskiöld
