= Forsbacka =

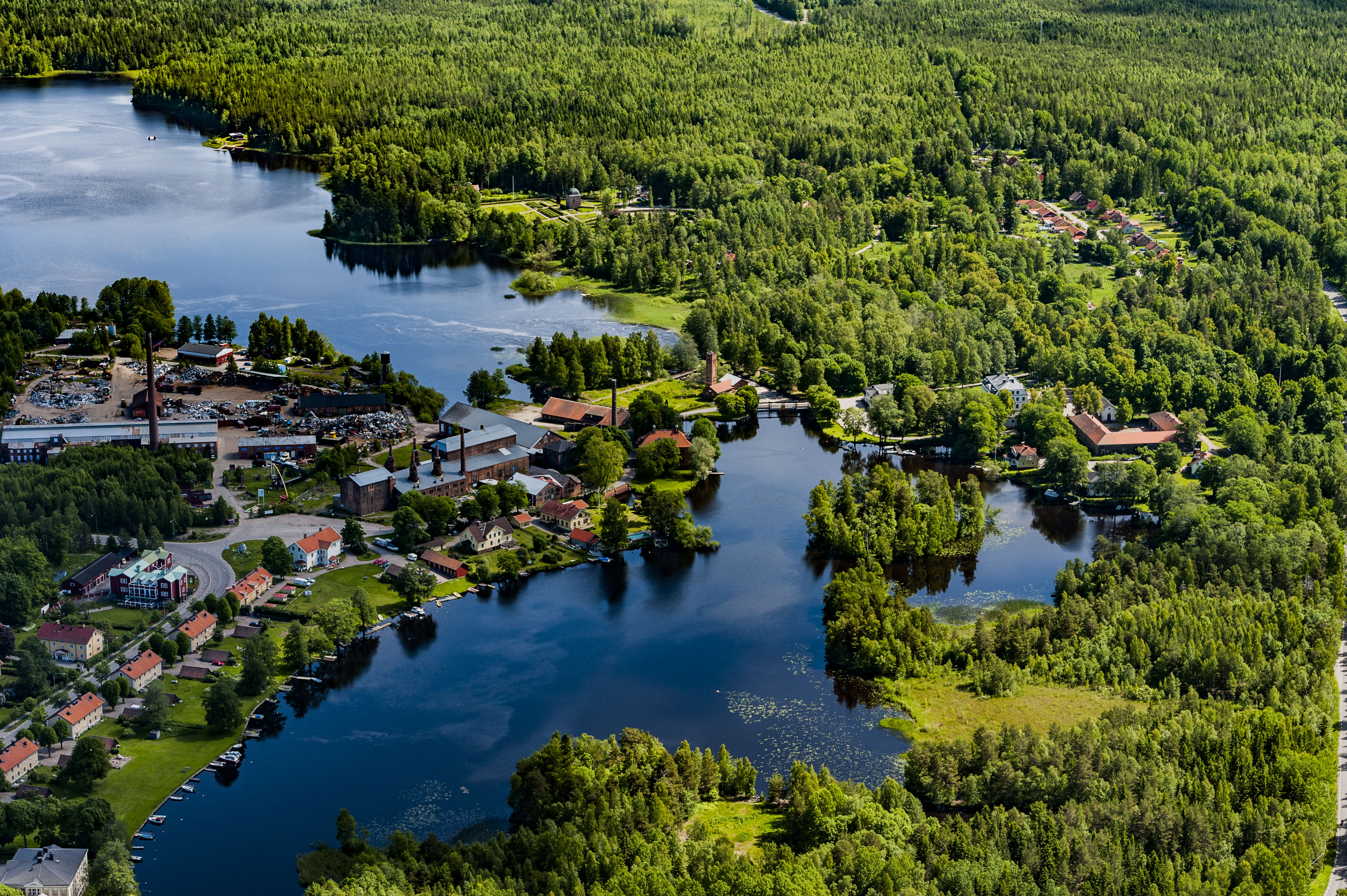
- Photo of Forsbacka bruk in 2021

- Location within Sweden Gävleborg Location within Sweden
- Coordinates: 60°37′N 16°53′E
- Country: Sweden
- Province: Gästrikland
- County: Gävleborg County
- Municipality: Gävle Municipality

Area
  - Total: 1.72 km^{2} (0.66 sq mi)

Population (31 December 2010)
  - Total: 1,702
  - Density: 991/km^{2} (2,570/sq mi)
- Time zone: UTC+1 (CET)
  - Summer (DST): UTC+2 (CEST)

Forsbacka is a locality situated in Gävle Municipality, Gävleborg County, Sweden with 1,702 inhabitants in 2010.

== Economy ==
Steel production company Ovako has a production site in Forsbacka with approximately 70 employees.

== Culture ==
Sites of interest include the Forsbacka bruk and Forsbacka herrgård. The latter was built at the behest of Johan Magnus af Nordin in 1777.

== Transport ==
It is located along European route E16.
