= Hilda Sandels =

Swedish opera singer

Hilda Augusta Adelaide Sandels (1830–1921) was a Swedish opera singer.

Sandels was born to colonel lieutenant Lars Sandels. She was the student of Julius Günther and continued her studies in Leipzig. She performed in Berlin, Stockholm, Oslo, and Copenhagen. She married custom official Jakob Björklund in 1857.
