= Johan Gabriel Richert =

Swedish jurist and politician

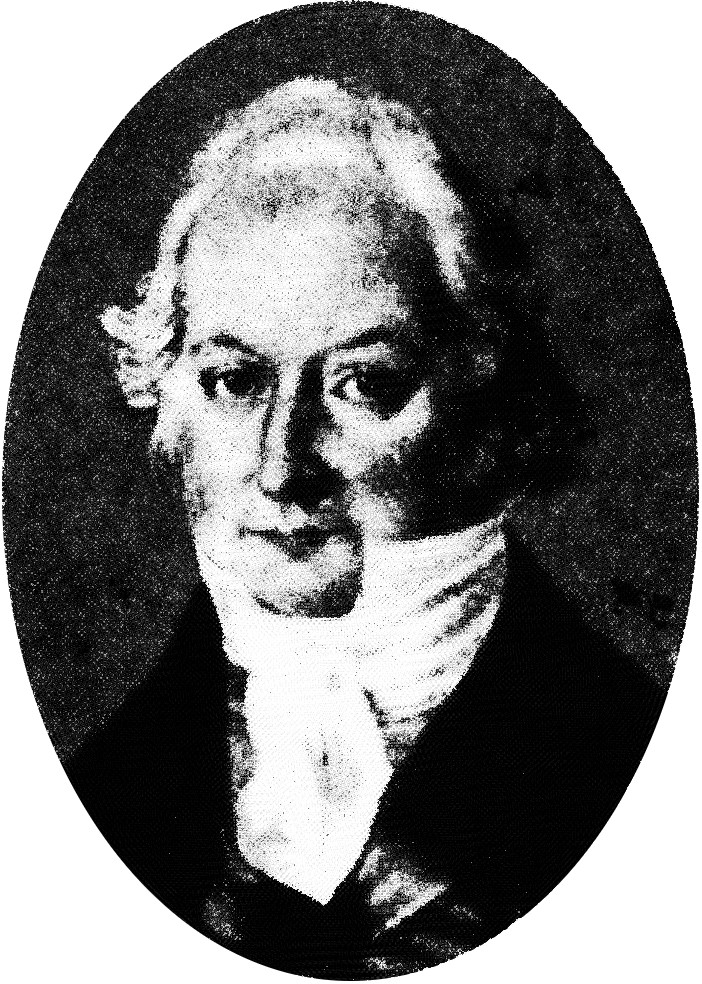

Johan Gabriel Richert (24 March 1784 – 2 January 1864), Swedish jurist and politician. He was one of Sweden's most distinguished lawyers during the former half of the 19th century and is regarded as the father of Swedish liberalism. His thinking was mainly influenced by Benthamism, but Richert was also influenced by Kant. Richert played an instrumental role in mid-nineteenth century Sweden legal reform and he was a vocal proponent of the replacement of the Riksdag of the Estates with a unicameral legislature.
