= Eufrosyne Abrahamson =

Swedish singer (1836–1869)

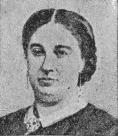
Eufrosyne Abrahamson

Eufrosyne Abrahamson (née Leman; 24 March 1836 – 7 February 1869) was a Swedish soprano.

== Biography ==
Born in Stockholm, Abrahamson was the daughter of Jewish parents, merchant John Leman and his wife Emma Jacobson. She began operatic studies under Julius Günther in 1852, which were completed in 1855. She made a successful debut in May 1855 as Panima in The Magic Flute. She then continued study under Gilbert Duprez in Paris. She was later contracted to Teatro Real, Madrid where she made her debut in September 1858 as Elvira in Ernani. In 1859, Abrahamson made a move to a Viennese theatre company, receiving acclaim. However, her career as a soprano ended when she married the businessman August Abrahamson on 4 October 1859. She later devoted herself to philanthropy and continued to sing at weddings.

In 1868, she was elected to the Royal Swedish Academy of Music. Following a short illness, Abrahamson died in Gothenburg in 1869, at the age of 32.
