= Augusta Björkenstam =

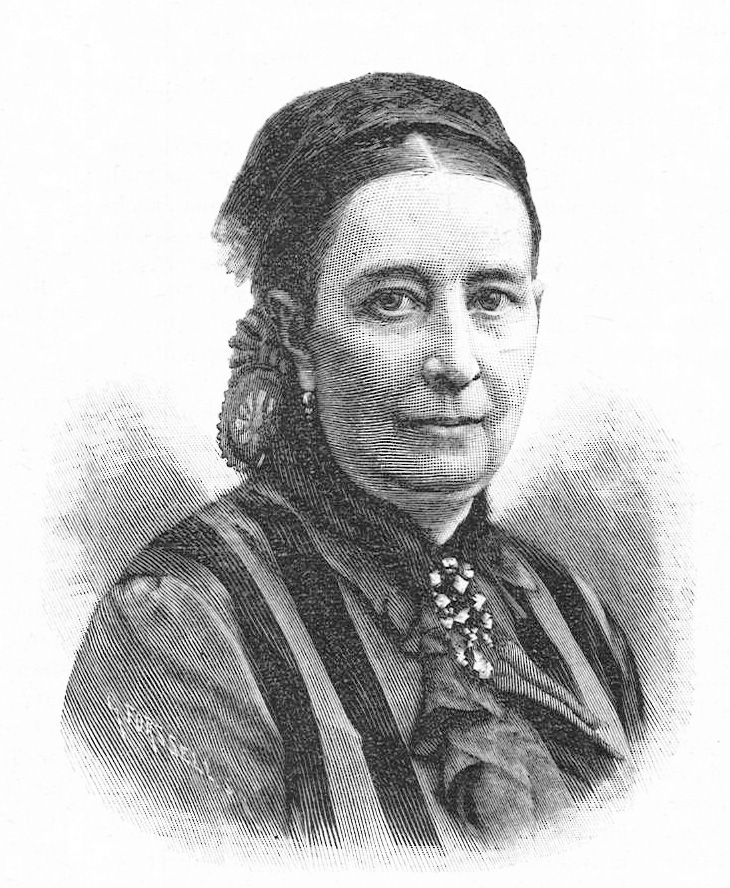
Augusta Björkenstam

Augusta Björkenstam (3 December 1829 - 10 July 1892) was a Swedish countess and businessperson. She founded the transport company Stockholms Expressbyrå (1877), which managed the transport of luggage from the Stockholm Central Train Station to its recipients. Her company was eventually also engaged by the authorities, the customs, railway stations, boat traffic and shops as well as the postal offices.
