= Eva Ramstedt =

Swedish physicist (1879–1974)

- Born: Eva Julia Augusta Ramstedt; 15 September 1879; Stockholm, Sweden
- Died: 11 September 1974 (aged 94); Stockholm
- Education: Uppsala University; Sorbonne University
- Known for: Radiology, half life of radium
- Scientific career
- Fields: Physics

Eva Julia Augusta Ramstedt (15 September 1879 – 11 September 1974) was a Swedish physicist who specialized in radiology and studied under Nobel laureate Marie Curie. She was heavily involved in women's rights in academia and was among the founding members of an association for female academics now known as Kvinnliga Akademikers Förening. Due in part to the association's efforts, several legal changes were enacted that nudged Swedish female academics closer to having the same rights as their male colleagues, including a change to the Basic Laws of Sweden in 1909 and universal suffrage in 1921.

== Family background and social origin ==
Ramstedt was born in Stockholm in 1879, the daughter of Henrika Charlotta Torén and Johan Ramstedt—a politician and Governor-General who briefly served as Prime Minister of Sweden in 1905. She grew up in an environment with significant social and economic capital.

== Education ==
She attended Uppsala University as an undergraduate and graduate student, and finished her doctorate on the properties of expanding liquids at Uppsala University in 1910. After earning her doctorate, Ramstedt studied under Marie Curie at Sorbonne University in Paris.

== Career ==
In 1903, Ramstedt returned to Sweden and began working at the Nobel Institute of Physical Chemistry. She was appointed to a radiology position at Stockholms högskola (Stockholm University College) in 1915 and continued there until 1932. However, as a woman she was not considered for a permanent professorship and taught classes there only briefly. Instead, she also took a position as a teacher of mathematics and physics at the Stockholm Folkskoleseminariet, a normal school (teacher training college), from 1919 to 1945.

Throughout her career, Ramstedt collaborated with many other scientists. Some of her most notable work was produced through her collaboration with Norway-based radiochemist Ellen Gleditsch. They studied radiology, specifically the half-life of radium. In 1917, they published a book on the subject called Radium och radioaktiva processer. As a result of her work, Ramstedt received the Illis quorum of the eighth degree in 1942.

== University association activity ==
During her studies at Uppsala University, Ramstedt was a member and, at one point, president of the Uppsala kvinnliga studentförening (Uppsala Women's Student Association), one of the few organisations of its kind at the beginning of the 20th century.

== Details regarding her research in Paris ==
In 1910–1911, she spent a year at the Sorbonne in Paris studying radioactive processes, where she received direct training from Marie Curie and expanded her expertise in experimental physics. Based in Curie's first laboratory on Rue Cuvier, she established long-lasting friendships with Ellen Gleditsch and May Sybil Leslie. In 1920 and 1926, she spent several weeks at the recently established Curie Institute.

== Scientific work and expeditions ==
During her time at the Nobel Institute of Physical Chemistry, Ramstedt published the essay On the activity of the undissociated molecule in ester catalysis (1915) and participated in an expedition to observe the solar eclipse in Strömsund, where she measured atmospheric electricity.

== Notable scientific contacts ==
Ramstedt established strong scientific relationships with prominent researchers of the era, including Lise Meitner, a pioneer in nuclear physics, and the radiochemist Ellen Gleditsch, with whom she co-authored the work Radium och radioaktiva processer (1917).

== Other roles and social functions ==
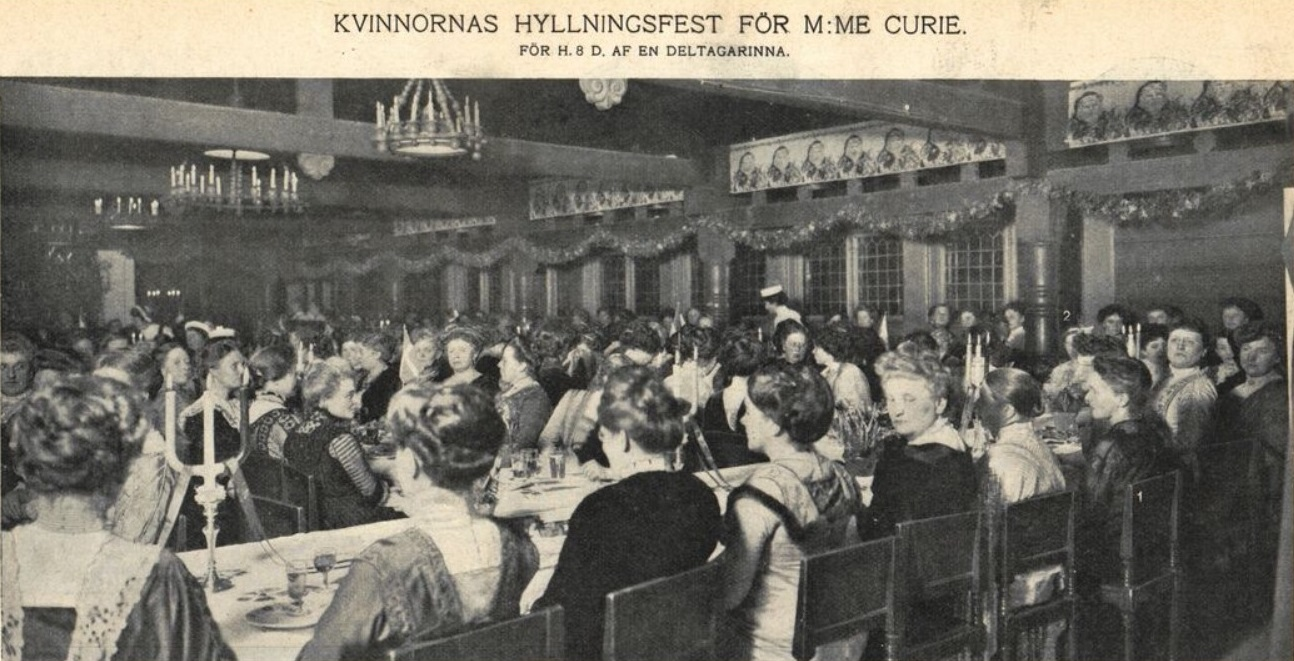
Akademiskt bildade kvinnors förening celebrating Marie Curie at Skansens Högloft in Stockholm, Sweden on 14 December 1911.

When Marie Curie visited Stockholm in 1911 to collect her Nobel Prize for chemistry, Ramstedt was one of the speakers at the reception that Akademiskt bildade kvinnors förening (now Kvinnliga Akademikers Förening) held in her honour three days later. She took the opportunity to tell Curie what she meant to her closest colleagues. In addition to her scientific and teaching activities, Ramstedt served as vice-chair of the board of the Stockholm Women's Technical School (1920) and was the secretary and later president of the Sällskapet Nya Idun association between 1921 and 1939.

== Later life ==
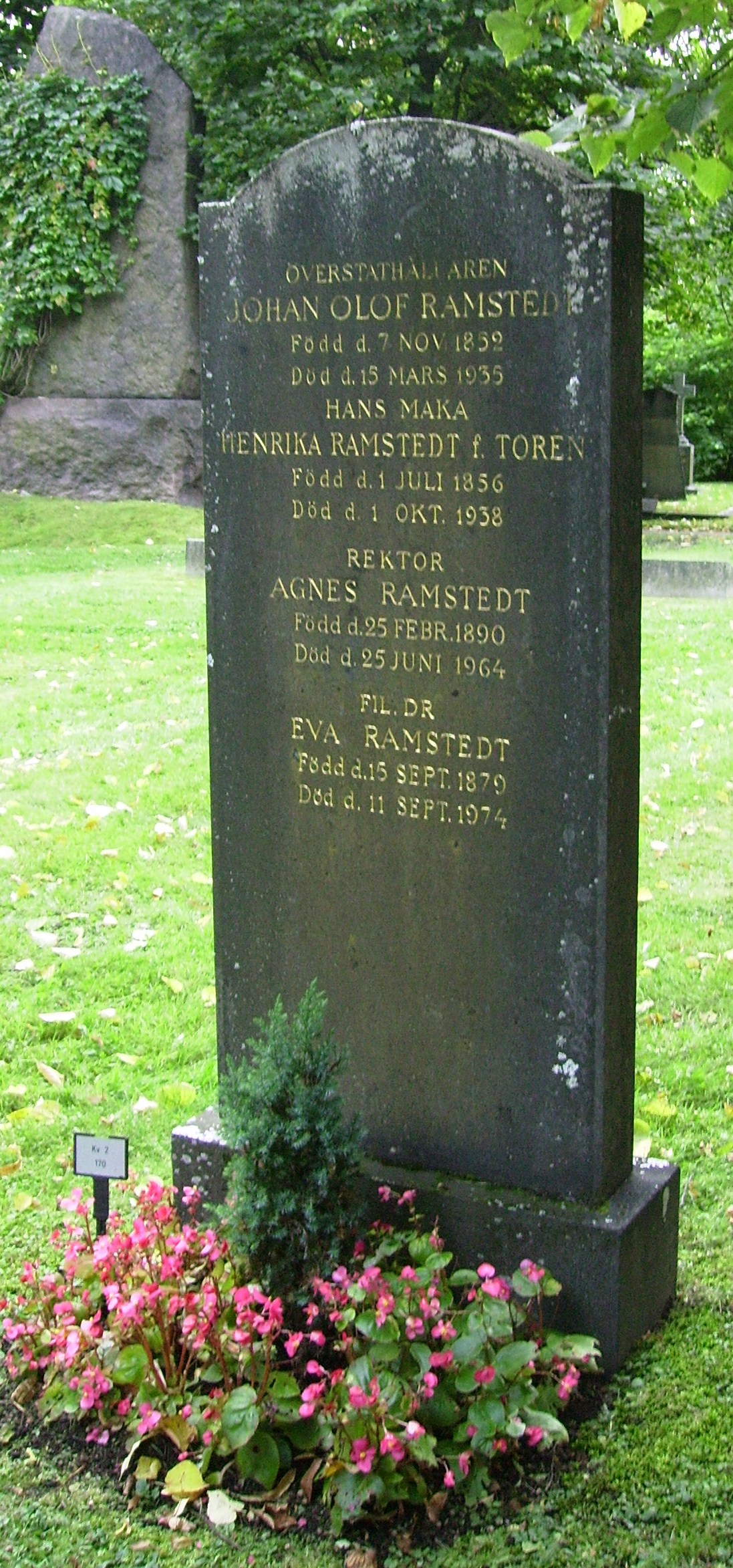
Gravestone of Ramstedt family

Eva Ramstedt retired in 1945 when she was 66. After spending the next 29 years living peacefully, she died on 11 September 1974, aged 95. She is buried in the family grave in Solna's Northern Cemetery.

== See also ==
- List of women associated with Marie Curie and Irène Joliot-Curie
