= Solveig Rönn-Christiansson =

Swedish politician

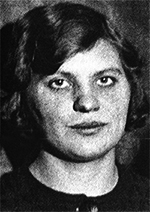
- Solveig Rönn-Christiansson

Member of the Riksdag
- In office 1945–1958
- In office 1937–1940

Member of Gothenburg City Council
- In office 1943–1946

Personal details
- Born: November 11, 1902 Gothenburg, Sweden
- Died: June 8, 1982 (aged 79) Stockholm, Sweden
- Party: Communist Party of Sweden

Solveig Adina Olena Rönn-Christiansson (11 November 1902 – 8 June 1982) was a Swedish politician and trade unionist. She served as a member of the Second Chamber of the Parliament of Sweden for the Communist Party for two separate terms: the first term 1937–1940 and the second term 1945–1958. Between her two terms in Parliament, she served as a member of the Gothenburg City Council in 1943–1946.

== Life ==
Solveig Rönn-Christiansson was born in Gothenburg as one of ten children to lamplighter Olof Natanael Ståhle Rönn and Alma Charlotta Johansdotter. In 1934 she married metalworker Bertil Joar Christiansson, whom she divorced in 1948. They had a daughter.

=== Unionist ===
Rönn-Christiansson started to work as a teenager and worked as a maid, in a confectionery and as a washerwoman at Sahlgrenska University Hospital. She was politically engaged early on. She joined the Swedish Municipal Workers' Union in 1925, sat on the board of the local union from 1926 to 1928 and served as its secretary in 1935. In 1931, she was arrested in connection with the Ådalen shootings. She was prosecuted but was in the end released. She herself commented on the fact that she escaped a prison sentence:

"In a way, I did felt it was a shame, because I thought that if I was placed in prison, I would have been given the opportunity to educate myself somewhat".

=== Political career ===
In parallel to her union work, she became engaged in the Communist Party. She served as member of the Gothenburg district of the Communist Party from 1930 to 1932 and as a representative of the Communists on the Gothenburg school board in 1936. In the 1936 election, she was nominated to the Riksdag's Andra kammar (Second Chamber of Parliament) by the Gothenburg Communists and won. In the election of 1940, she lost her seat after the Communist Party in Sweden lost favor with Swedish voters due to the Soviet Union's attack on Finland. Instead, she took a seat on the Gothenburg City Council. When the sympathy for Communists grew after the Russians' victory over Nazi Germany, she was able to win back her Parliament seat in 1945.

Rönn-Christiansson was the first woman Communist to be elected to the Swedish Parliament. She was very active during her time there. In Parliament, she focused on social politics and union issues, such as legislation of the right to sedation during delivery and equal pay for equal work between men and women. She also motioned for the ban of spanking in the educational system, which she condemned both for being pedagogically counterproductive as well as socially discriminatory, as she claimed the spanking was mainly used on working-class students. She was before her time when she stated that the issue of economy in the home was not an issue for women and housewives but for the nation as a whole. This was an issue in which she had experience from her work as a unionist and as a school board member. In 1945, she was elected to serve on the school textbook commission, in which she served until 1953.

Rönn-Christiansson was a popular member of the labor movement in Gothenburg, where was often able to mediate between the Communists and the Social Democrats.

=== Later life ===
After leaving her seat in Parliament in 1958, Solveig Rönn-Christiansson worked as a janitor at Sahlgrenska University Hospital.

She was also active as a lay judge.

== Sources ==
- Tvåkammarriksdagen 1867–1970 (Almqvist & Wiksell International 1992), vol. 4, p. 144
- Hemarbete som politik, Britta Lövgren, Almqvist & Wiksell, 1993
- Wiberg, Roger: Den stora agadebatten (2006)
- Solveig Rönn-Christiansson at Svenskt kvinnobiografiskt lexikon
