= Huskvarna Church =

Coordinates: 57.7875°N 14.2736°E

- Huskvarna kyrka
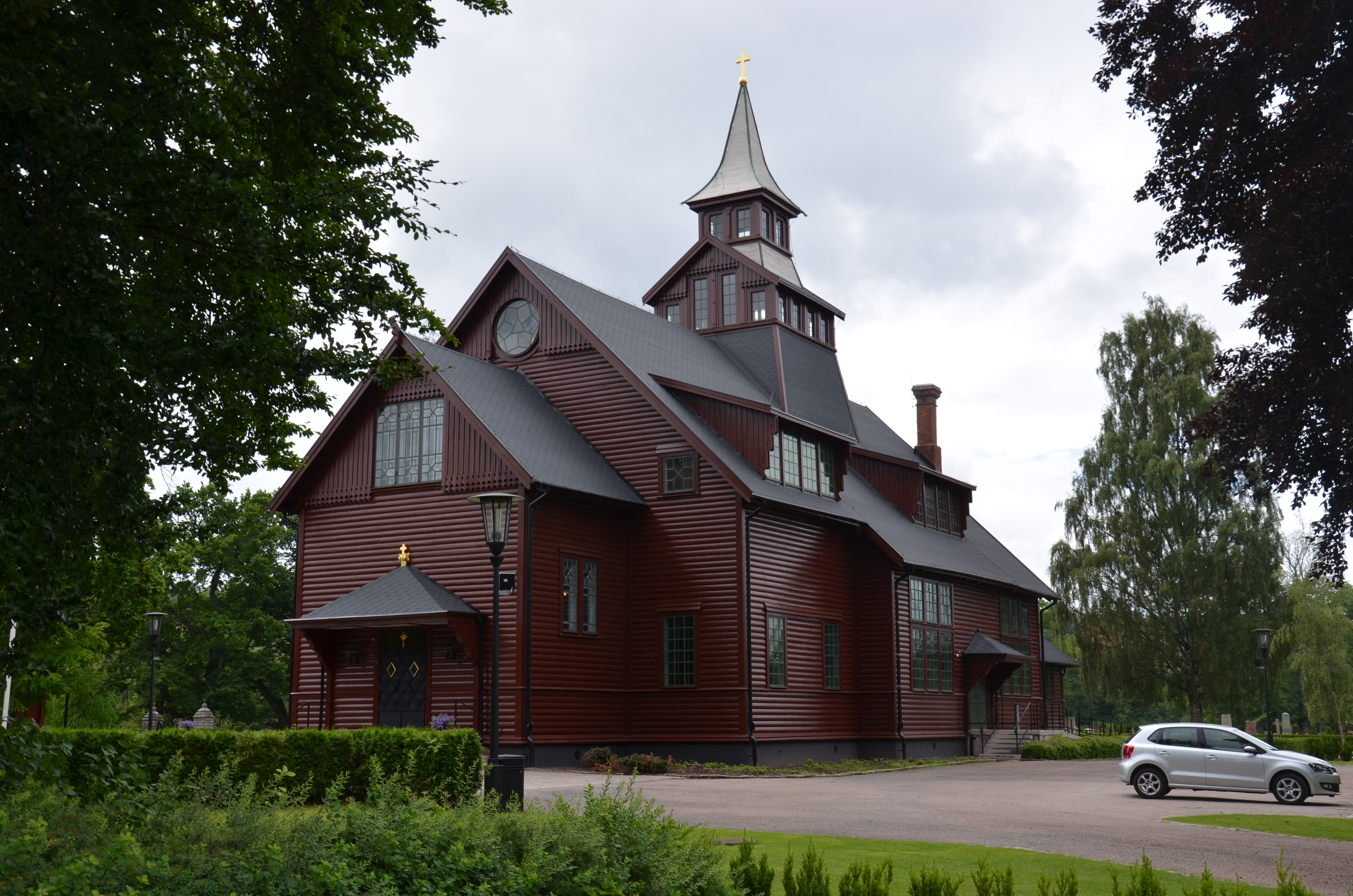
- Huskvarna Church in July 2012
- Huskvarna Church
- Location: Huskvarna
- Country: Sweden
- Denomination: Church of Sweden

History
- Consecrated: June 1910

Administration
- Diocese: Växjö
- Parish: Huskvarna

Huskvarna Church (Swedish: Huskvarna kyrka) is a wooden church in Huskvarna in Sweden. Belonging to Huskvarna Parish of the Church of Sweden, it was inaugurated in June 1910.
