= 1832 in Sweden =

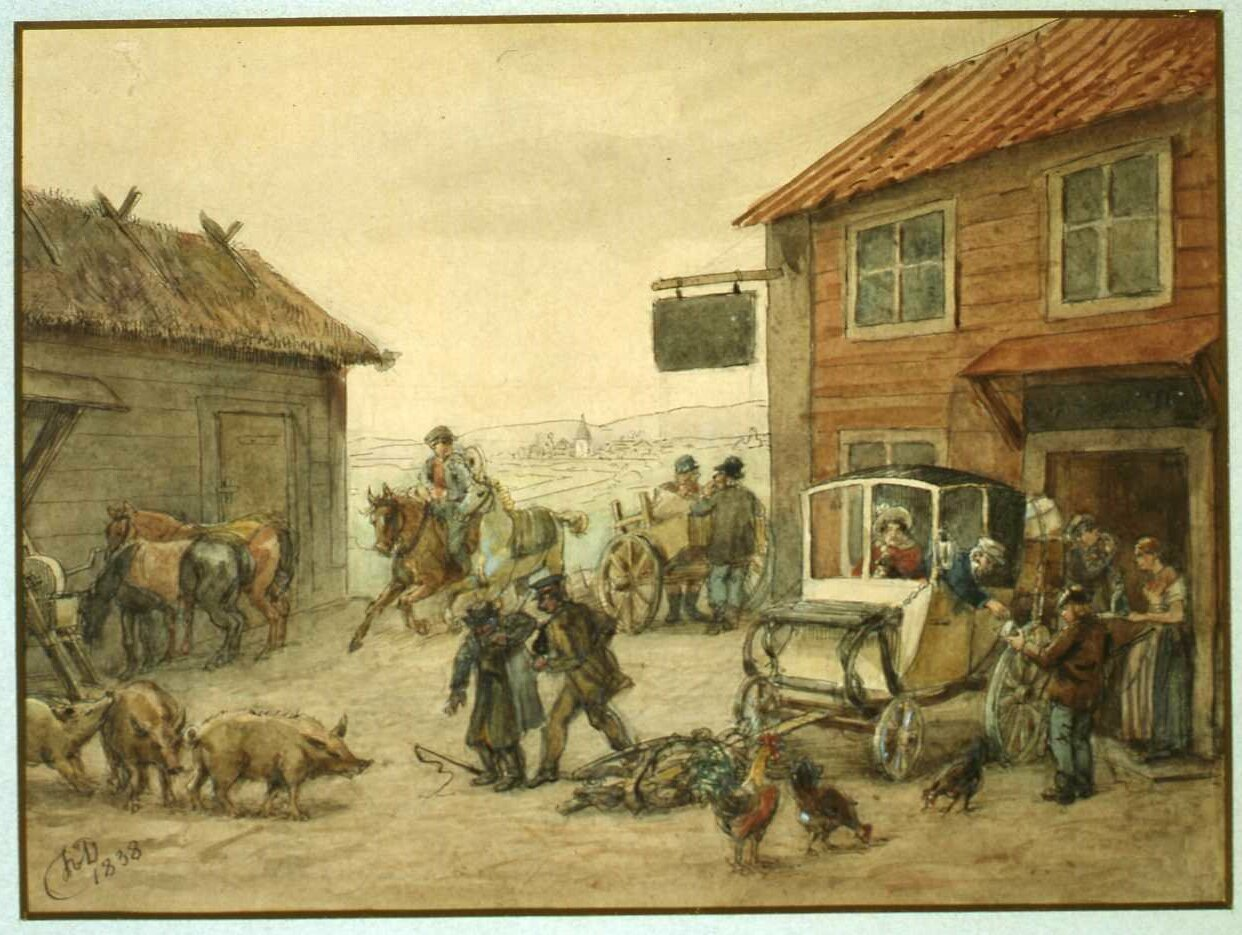

Events from the year 1832 in Sweden

== Incumbents ==
- Monarch – Charles XIV John

== Events ==
- 26 September - Inauguration of the Göta Canal.
- The trade with meat, bread and drink is liberalized in 37 Swedish cities.
- First issue of the Göteborgs Handels- och Sjöfartstidning

== Births ==
- 23 January - Charlotte Pousette, stage actress (died 1877)
- 17 July - August Söderman, composer (died 1876)
- 3 October - Lina Sandell, writer (died 1903)
- 12 November - Nancy Edberg, pioneer swimmer (died 1892)
- 18 November - Adolf Erik Nordenskiöld, Arctic explorer (died 1901)
- 4 October - Thorborg Rappe, pioneer in the education of students with Intellectual disability (died 1902)
- Amanda Rylander, actress (died 1920)

== Deaths ==
- 22 February - Charlotta Cederström, artist (born 1760)
- 30 November - Carl Roth II, ironmaster
- Jonas Kjellberg, Kjellbergska flickskolan funder
- Hedvig Ulrika De la Gardie, courtier (born 1761)
