= Emil von Qvanten =

Finnish and Swedish poet (1827–1903)

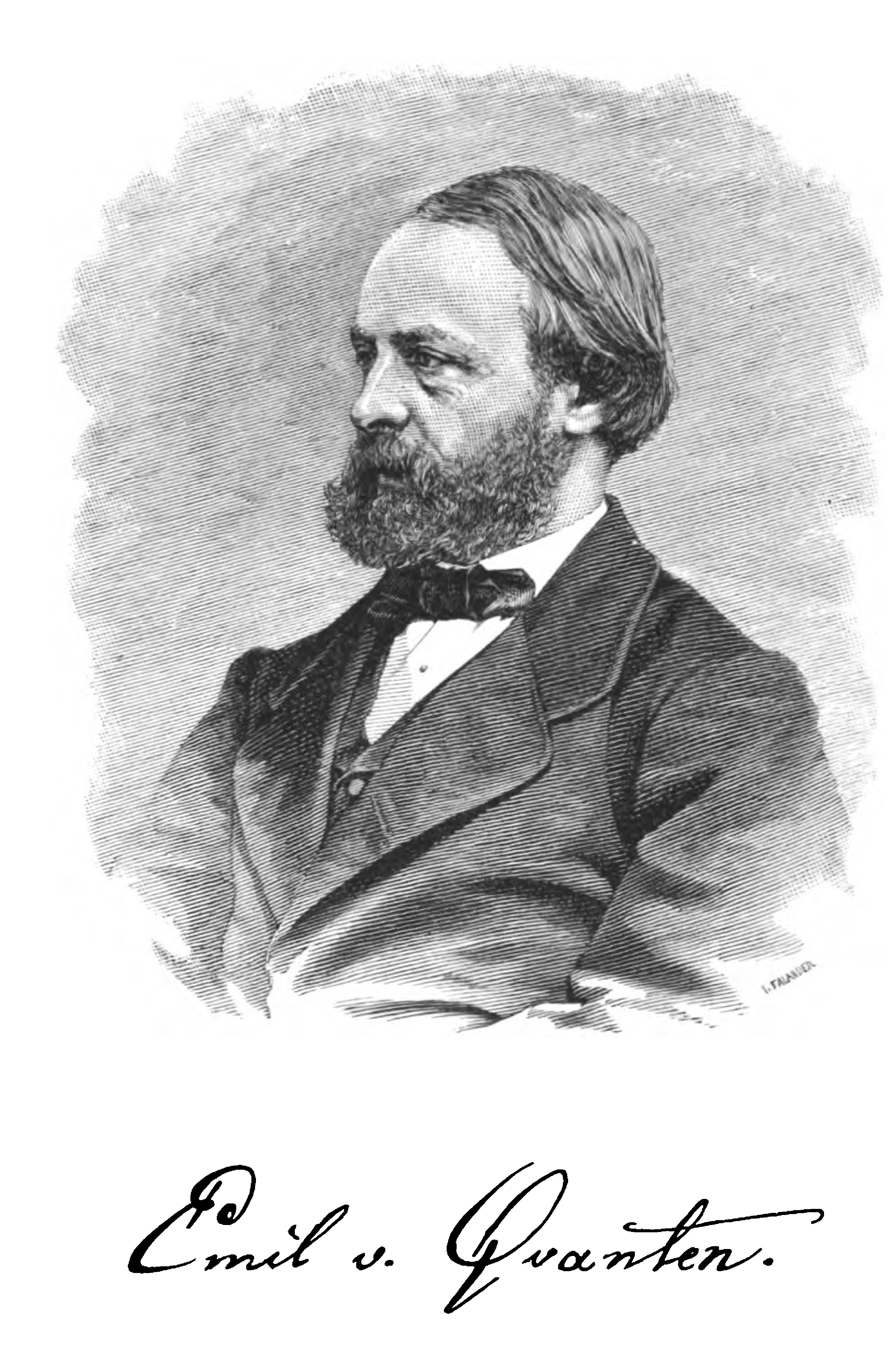

Emil von Qvanten (22 August 1827 – 5 December 1903) was a Swedish-speaking Finnish and Swedish poet, librarian, publisher, and politician. He was born in Pori, Finland, and died in San Remo, Italy. Throughout his life, Finland was governed as the Grand Duchy of Finland, part of the Russian Empire.

Qvanten was the son of Captain Johan Edvard von Qvanten and Carolina Fredrika von Kothen. He was married to Aurora Magdalena Örnberg, who was also known by her pen name Turdus Merula. He attended the Haminan Cadet School and graduated in 1846. He began his career as a newspaper contributor and editor and lived in Sweden from 1853 onward. Qvanten acquired Swedish citizenship in 1857. He served as the deputy librarian of the Royal Library in 1864 and became the permanent librarian from 1865 to 1872. From 1890 to 1903, he worked as a journalist in Rome.

Qvanten traveled both in the Far East and visited South Africa before settling in exile in Stockholm, Sweden. Here he produced anonymous political propaganda that was smuggled into Finland. He sought a form of Finnish nationalism that combined Scandinavianism with Fennomania. In 1855, Oskar Tammelander, working for the Russian secret police, went to Stockholm and met Qvanten, but aroused Qvanten's suspicions. So Qvanten supplied the infiltrator with a letter full of literary parodies to excite the suspicions of his contacts in Finland. This succeeded and Tammelander was unmasked as a spy.

== Publications ==
- Dikter (1851)
- Fennomani och skandinavism (1855)
- Lyriska dikter (1859)
- Två månader i Rhentrakterna under kriget 1870 (1870)
- Dikter, nya och gamla (1880)
- Fyra sagodikter (1900)
- I djurskyddsfrågan (1901)
- Kritiska ströftåg af Heimdall (1857)
