= Johan Ramstedt =

Swedish Prime Minister

His Excellency Johan Ramstedt
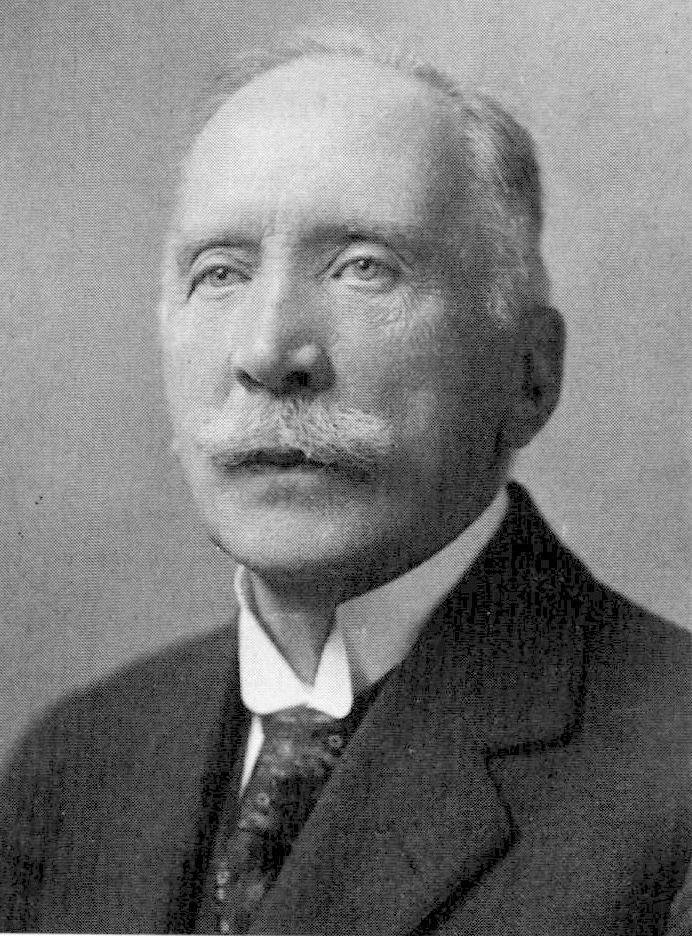

Prime Minister of Sweden
- In office 14 April 1905 – 2 August 1905
- Monarch: Oscar II
- Preceded by: Erik Gustaf Boström
- Succeeded by: Christian Lundeberg

Personal details
- Born: Johan Olof Ramstedt; 7 November 1852 Stockholm, Sweden
- Died: 15 March 1935 (aged 82) Stockholm, Sweden
- Party: Independent
- Spouse: Henrika Charlotta Torén (m. 1878)
- Children: Eva Ramstedt
- Education: Uppsala University

Johan Olof Ramstedt (7 November 1852 – 15 March 1935) was a Swedish statesman and jurist who served as Prime Minister of Sweden from April to August 1905. Appointed during the political crisis surrounding the dissolution of the union with Norway, his short tenure was marked by efforts to resolve the conflict through negotiation and constitutional means. After the union’s breakup, Ramstedt resigned and later served as Governor of Uppsala from 1905 to 1925.

== Early life and family ==
Johan Ramstedt was born in Stockholm, son to clothing manufacturer Reinhold Ramstedt and his wife Maria Sofia Haeggström. He attended Uppsala university where he earned a degree in Government Studies in 1873 after which he interned at the Svea Court of Appeal in Stockholm. In 1878 he married Henrika Charlotta Torén. Their daughter Eva Ramstedt was born the following year and grew up to be a physicist who worked with Marie Curie and Ellen Gleditsch and campaigned for women's rights.

== Career ==
In 1878 he was appointed Vice Prolocutor. He became acting official of the Court of Appeals in 1880, associate member in 1882, and full member official of the Court of Appeals in 1884.

Ramstedt was appointed as a government notary to the Second Chamber of the Swedish parliament in 1876 and then to the 1st Chamber from 1877 to 1882. He moved on to the Ministry of Justice in 1892, after which he was promoted to Head of the Justice department in 1896 until 1898 when he was appointed Justice Councillor of the Supreme Court of Sweden.

In 1902 the newly elected prime minister Erik Gustaf Boström called upon Ramstedt to join his cabinet. Under Boström, Ramstedt served as acting Foreign Minister. Boström resigned as prime minister due to the Swedish-Norwegian Union crisis of 1905 at which time Ramstedt was appointed prime minister. His immediate task was to solve the union crisis. Together with the Crown prince Gustav V a plan was designed allowing the Norwegians to exit the Union with the caveat that the Norwegians would exit the Union without the involvement of the Norwegian Parliament. However the plan never came to fruition as the Norwegian Parliament dissolved the Union on 7 June. Ramstedt's government made a proposal to the Swedish Parliament where in the Parliament was to grant the Government power to negotiate the terms for the dissolving of the Union with the Norwegians. A secret committee led by the First Chamber’s Protectionist Party leader Christian Lundeberg rejected the Government's proposal which led to the resignation of Ramstedt and his entire Cabinet, something which had not occurred since 1809.

Ramstedt was re-appointed Justice Councillor by his successor Prime Minister Lundeberg and in 1909 became the first Government Councillor of the newly created Supreme Administrative Court. In 1912, Ramstedt was appointed Governor of Stockholm by Prime Minister Staaff.

In 1920, Ramstedt retired and lived peacefully until his death in 1935.

Preceded by Erik Gustaf Boström	Prime Minister of Sweden; April – August 1905	Succeeded by Christian Lundeberg
