= Anna Stecksén =

Swedish scientist, physician and pathologist

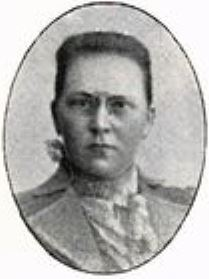
Anna Stecksén

Anna Magdalena Stecksén (May 27, 1870 – October 15, 1904) was a Swedish scientist, physician and pathologist. She was the first female Doctor of Medicine in Sweden.

Born in Stockholm, Anna Stecksén was the daughter of general major Johan Olof Billdau Stecksén, who encouraged her to pursue advanced education. She was awarded a Bachelor of Arts at Uppsala University in 1890, and became a student at Karolinska institutet the same year. She pursued her studies at Tübingen and Paris 1898–99. At a time when most women who studied medicine specialized in gynecology, she specialized in pathology

She became the first Swedish woman to defend a thesis in medicine. She was awarded the Doctor of Medicine in 1900. Her thesis, Studie öfver Curtis blastomyocel - från svulst - etiologisk synpunk investigated whether there was any truth in the then-popular theory that cancer was caused by Saccharomyces cerevisiae. Her findings were not conclusive, but interesting enough for her to raise the funds to continue her research. She was only the second women to publish in the Swedish medical journal Hygiea. She contracted an infection caused by her work in her laboratory in 1902 which eventually led to her death in 1904, in Södertälje. She was buried at Norra cemetery in Solna.
