= Caroline Gother =

Caroline Gother (1761–1836) was a Swedish banker.

== Life ==
She was born to Maria Elisabeth Bedoir (1726–1783) and the rich merchant and city official Engelbert Gother (1708–1775). Her father died bankrupted, and her sisters swiftly married to support themselves; but she chose to become a governess. She corresponded with the poet Johan Elers.

In 1793, she inherited a fortune from a relative. In accordance with the Civil Code of 1734, unmarried women were legal minors under the guardianship of their closest male relative for life and could not handle their own money, but they could have themselves declared of legal majority by a petition to the monarch, which was a common procedure for unmarried business women. Caroline Gother had herself declared of legal majority on 22 November of that year, and engaged in business. She used her fortune by managing her own bank, investing her money in real estate and speculated in business, buying shares. She was successful and reportedly managed to use her inherited fortune to create another one, and was at her death described as one of the richest women in Sweden.
