= Hanna Hammarström =

Swedish inventor and industrialist

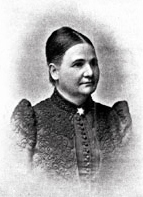
- Hanna Hammarström in 1898
- Born: Joanna Hammarström; 4 September 1829; Stockholm
- Died: 27 November 1914 (aged 85)
- Occupations: inventor and industrialist

Johanna (Hanna) Hammarström was a Swedish inventor who was born on 4 September 1829 and died on 27 November 1914. Although telephones had already been invented, no one in Sweden could manufacture the copper wires needed to function telephones. She became the first person in Sweden to manufacture telephone wires and ran her own business in the production of these wires.

== Early life ==
Hanna Hammarstrom was born on 4 September 1829 in Stockholm, Sweden, to her parents Nils Hammerstrom and Christina Holmberg [2]. Her father was a cotton and silk merchant in Stolkholm, but was originally from Dalarna, a central province of Sweden a little more than 300 km away [1]. While completing her early education at Ms. Norbergson's girls' school, her father encouraged her to learn a trade. She apprenticed for a handicraft maker, who specialized in small wire ornaments. Her experience working with wire would prove useful later in her life when she launched her venture. She left home after she completed her primary education to learn how to become a housekeeper, but soon had to go back to care for her dying mother [3]. Her mother died 5 years later, and the Hammerstrom family business of textiles trading had fallen into disarray [2]. Hanna knew that she would have to support herself because she did not have a spouse. She spent between 10- and 20-years making hat frames out of wire, but decided to abandon that business when telephones started coming to Sweden [3]. Her experience in creating wire ornaments as a child, and then using large machinery to fabricate wire hat frames, would soon become useful. Although the telephone was invented in 1876 by Alexander Graham Bell, it did not become viable in Sweden until the early 1880s [5].

== Innovation ==
As telephones became a commonplace in Sweden, a provider of telecommunication services, Telefonaktiebolaget, opened in Stockholm. The owner of the factory, Lars Magnus Ericsson, offered Hanna the adjacent building, for 1 Króna per day [2]. She took advantage of the opportunity and got to work fabricating telephone wire. The products included double-spun thread, wires, and the cords that connected the mouthpiece to the earpiece [2]. Prior to her entrance into the market, these wires had to be imported from Germany because the technology was unknown in Sweden [3]. Hanna single-handedly figured out how the wires worked and established a method of production which allowed her to undercut her German competition. As technology improved, Hanna was able to keep up and maintain market share. Her high-quality work product gained her more factories as clients and greatly expanded her order book. Eventually, she even began selling her wire to companies in Finland as well [2].

At the height of production, Hanna oversaw a factory with 5 large fabrication machines [3]. The factory was run by 8 women, all of whom Hanna had trained herself. Hanna won first prize at an exhibition for power and production machinery in 1886 for her ingenuity [3].

Today, the company that originally relied on her wires is known as Ericsson, a publicly traded telecommunications company listed on the NASDAQ [4]. The company has a market capitalization of US$21.65 billion as of 12/6/2022 [6]. Without Hanna's wires and fabrication innovations, Ericsson would not be the company that it is today.

== Late life ==
The factory that she originally founded closed its doors in 1909 because Hannah was in her old age. She died just 5 years later at the age of 85 [2].
