= 1903 in Sweden =

- Decades: 1880s; 1890s; 1900s; 1910s; 1920s
- See also: Other events of 1903; Timeline of Swedish history

Events from the year 1903 in Sweden

== Incumbents ==
- Monarch – Oscar II
- Prime Minister – Erik Gustaf Boström

== Events ==
- The National Association for Women's Suffrage is founded.
- Agnes Arvidsson becomes the first woman to graduate in pharmacology.
- Public medical offices open to women.
- Forming of the Central Employers' Association (SAF)
  - The SAF game rather late in the labor union movement of Sweden
  - Counterpart of the labor union, LO
  - Acted as open cartel

== Popular culture ==
=== Literature ===
- August Strindberg's novel Alone (Swedish: Ensam) is published.

== Births ==
- 31 January – Ivar Johansson, wrestler (died 1979).
- 26 May – Israel Ruong, Swedish-Sámi linguist and politician (died 1986).
- 21 June – Alf Sjöberg, theatre and film director (died 1980).
- 7 July – Gustaf Jonsson, Olympic cross country skier (died 1990).
- 13 July – Olle Hallberg, Olympic long jumper (died 1996)

== Deaths ==
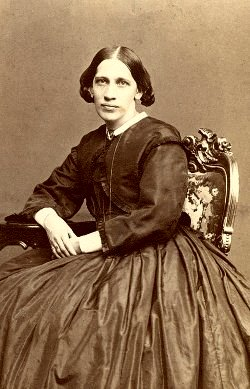
Lina Sandell.

- 19 May – Carl Snoilsky, poet (born 1841)
- 27 July – Lina Sandell, hymn writer (born 1832).
- 14 September – Johanna Berglind, sign language teacher and principal (born 1816).
- March – Josefina Wettergrund, writer (born 1830)
