= Josefina Wettergrund =

Swedish writer and poet (1830–1903)

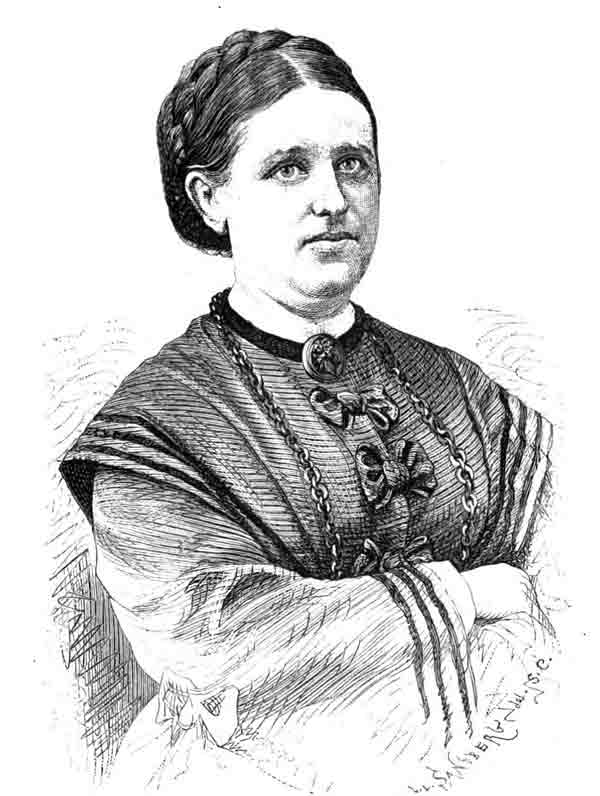
- Josefina Wettergrund
- Born: 2 September 1830; Ronneby
- Died: 8 March 1903 (aged 72)
- Occupations: Poet, writer, editor

Josefina Leontina Amanda Wettergrund (née Lundberg; 2 September 1830 – 8 March 1903, in Stockholm), known by the pseudonym Lea, was a Swedish writer and poet. She was the editor of the family magazine Svalan in 1871–1875. She was admired particularly for her ability to depict the defects of human character with humor.

== Life ==
Wettergrund was born in 1830 to Carl Gustaf Kjellberg and Ulrika Lundberg, in the parish of Färlöv in Scania. Her father was a custom official and her mother was a teacher, not married to her father. She grew up with her mother in Blekinge, and attended school in Karlshamn. Wettergrund was active as a governess and opened and managed a girls' school in Ronneby in 1850–1857 before she married the telegrapher and later auditor Wilhelm Wettergrund and moved to Kalmar. From 1866, she lived in Stockholm.

Wettergrund has written poems and stories since childhood, and debuted as a published poet in 1858, with Småbitar på vers och prosa, which had a foreword by Wilhelm von Braun. This volume was followed by four others in a series. Wettergrund continued to contribute to various magazines and papers. In 1871–1875, she edited the weekly family magazine Svalan, where August Strindberg debuted as a novelist. She also edited the Aftonbladet serials section for a few years. She was a well known and popular writer in contemporary Sweden, and admired particularly for her ability to depict the defects of human character with humor. She wrote under the pseudonym Lea.

Wettergrund died in 1903 and is buried in Norra cemetery in Stockholm.

== Works ==
- Småbitar på vers och prosa. Stockholm: Brudin. 1858–1869.
- Tant Fridas minnesblad: novell. Stockholm: Flodin. 1866. Libris 1585942
- Blommor för dagen: tre berättelser. Stockholm: Flodin. 1868. Libris 1585941
- En trip till Bleking. 1872. Libris 10051341
- Logogryfer, äldre och nyare. Stockholm: Bonnier. 1879. Libris 1601571
- Ett fågelpar: berättelse. Öreskrifter för folket, 99-1474700-0; 115. Stockholm: Bonnier. 1882. Libris 1601991 – Med tre illustrationer av Victor Andrén.
- Sven Vandring: berättelse. Öreskrifter för folket, 99-1474700-0; 121. Stockholm: Bonnier. 1882. Libris 8835304 – Med trenne teckningar av C.G. Hellqvist
- "Ett par Ronnebybilder: 1 från "Lycksalighetens ö": 2 Karön". Svea: folk-kalender "1884,": sid. [153]-164. 1883. Libris 10649515
- Småherrskap: verklighetsbilder i fotografi från barnens krets. Stockholm: Bonnier. 1884. Libris 1601572
- Små bref till under- och öfverklassfolk från bror och syster. Linköping: Sahlström. 1890. Libris 1621683 – Medförfattare: Isidor Kjellberg.

== Sources ==
- Schöldström, Birger (1903). "Josephine Wettergrund (Lea) [nekrolog]". Svea Folk-kalender (1904): sid. 229–236. Libris 2105141
- Josefina Wettergrund, författarpresentation i Projekt Runeberg
- Bäckström, Maud, "Vår första kvinnliga redaktör Josefina Wettergrund". Ingår i: Vitterhetsnöjen: läsning för humanister och andra: till Magnus von * * Platen den 1 maj 1980. Umeå: Univ. 1980. Libris 7615327. ISBN 91-7174-052-X
- Heggestad, Eva (1991). Fången och fri: 1880-talets svenska kvinnliga författare om hemmet, yrkeslivet och konstnärskapet = [Captive and free]: [Swedish women writers of the 1880s on the home, working life, and artistry]. Skrifter utgivna av Avdelningen för litteratursociologi vid Litteraturvetenskapliga institutionen i Uppsala, 0349-1145; 27. Uppsala: Avd. för litteratursociologi vid Litteraturvetenskapliga institutionen, Univ. Libris 7746142. ISBN 91-85178-19-5
- Ryberg, Inga (1996). "Josephine Wettergrund – "Lea" – människa och skriftställarinna.". Carlshamniana (Karlshamn: Föreningen Karlshamns museum, 1986–) "1996 (11),": sid. 39–100 : ill. ISSN 0283-7862. ISSN 0283-7862 ISSN 0283-7862. Libris 2271667
- Schaffer, Ingrid (1999). "Jag är endast en sparf, som sitter i takrännan och qvittrar": Josefina Wettergrund skriver för den läsande familjen. Stockholm: * Litteraturvetenskapliga institutionen, univ. Libris 2879697
