= Blekinge County (Riksdag constituency) =

Constituency of the Riksdag, the national legislature of Sweden

- Blekinge Län
- Constituency for the Riksdag
- Location of Blekinge County within Sweden
- County: Blekinge
- Population: 156,620 (2025)
- Electorate: 123,336 (2026)
- Area: 3,052 km^{2} (2026)

Current constituency
- Created: 1970
- Seats: List (Note: Constituency seats only.): 5 (2002–present); 6 (1970–2002)
- Member of the Riksdag: List: Heléne Björklund (S); Åsa Coenraads (M); Magnus Johansson (S); Richard Jomshof (SD); Karolina Widerberg (SD)
- Created from: Blekinge County

Blekinge County (Swedish: Blekinge Län) is one of the 29 multi-member constituencies of the Riksdag, the national legislature of Sweden. The constituency was established in 1970 when the Riksdag changed from a bicameral legislature to a unicameral legislature. It is conterminous with the county of Blekinge. The constituency currently elects five of the 349 members of the Riksdag using the open party-list proportional representation electoral system. At the 2026 general election it had 123,336 registered electors.

== Electoral system ==
Blekinge County currently elects five of the 349 members of the Riksdag using the open party-list proportional representation electoral system. Constituency seats are allocated using the modified Sainte-Laguë method. Only parties that reach the 4% national threshold and parties that receive at least 12% of the vote in the constituency compete for constituency seats. Supplementary Levelling seats may also be allocated at the constituency level to parties that reach the 4% national threshold.

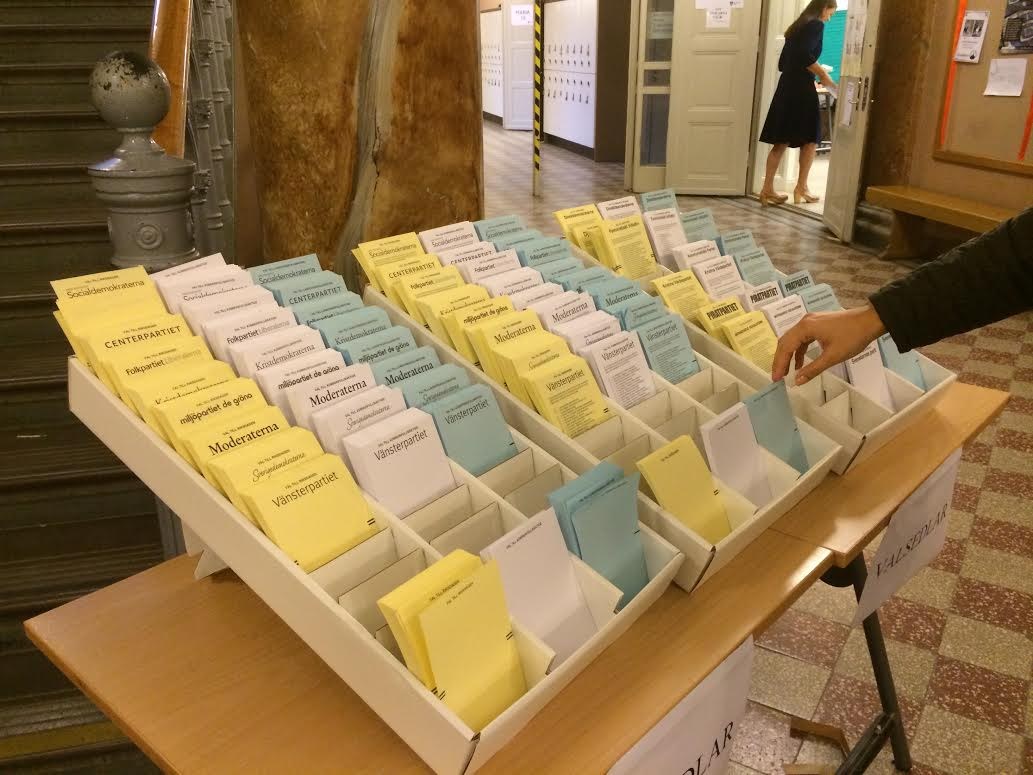
A selection of ballot papers available for voters at the 2014 general election in Stockholm - yellow for the Riksdag, blue for the regional council and white for the municipal council

Prior to 1997 voters could cast any ballot paper they wanted, though it had to contain the name of a party and the name of at least one candidate nominated by that party in the constituency. It was common for parties to hand out ballot papers with their name and list of candidates at the entrance of polling stations. Voters could delete the names of candidates or write-in the names of other candidates but in practice these options weren't used enough by voters to have any significant impact on the results and consequently elections operated as a closed system.

Since 1997, elections in Sweden follow the French model in having separate ballot papers for each party/list in a constituency. There are two ballot papers for each party - a party ballot paper (partivalsedel) with just the name of the party and a name ballot paper (namnvalsedel) with the name of the party and its list of candidates. There are also blank ballot papers (blank valsedel). Voters can initially pick as many ballot papers as they wish and then, in the secrecy of the voting booth, they select a single ballot paper of their choice. If they chose a name ballot paper they have the option of casting a preferential vote for one of their chosen party's candidates. If they chose a blank ballot paper they can write the name of any party including unregistered parties and, optionally, they can write the name of any person as their preferred candidate, even one that does not belong to their chosen party. They then place their chosen ballot paper in an envelope which is placed in the ballot box, discarding all other ballot papers they picked.

Seats won by each party/list in a constituency are allocated to its candidates in order of preference votes (a personal mandate), provided that the candidate has received at least 8% of votes cast for their party in the constituency (5% since January 2011). Any unfilled seats are then allocated to the party's remaining candidates in the order they appear on the party list (a party mandate).

== Election results ==
=== Summary ===
Election	Left V / VPK			Social Democrats S			Greens MP			Centre C			Liberals L / FP / F			Moderates M			Christian Democrats KD / KDS			Sweden Democrats SD		
Election	Votes	%	Seats	Votes	%	Seats	Votes	%	Seats	Votes	%	Seats	Votes	%	Seats	Votes	%	Seats	Votes	%	Seats	Votes	%	Seats
2026	6,113	5.86%	0	29,892	28.66%	2	3,985	3.82%	0	5,672	5.44%	0	5,066	4.86%	0	19,092	18.30%	1	7,601	7.29%	0	25,467	24.41%	2
2022	4,600	4.44%	0	32,255	31.14%	2	3,015	2.91%	0	5,014	4.84%	0	3,637	3.51%	0	18,500	17.86%	1	5,735	5.54%	0	29,556	28.53%	2
2018	5,699	5.45%	0	32,824	31.41%	2	3,025	2.89%	0	7,094	6.79%	0	4,197	4.02%	0	18,038	17.26%	1	5,954	5.70%	0	26,342	25.20%	2
2014	4,746	4.64%	0	37,981	37.15%	3	4,969	4.86%	0	5,792	5.67%	0	3,984	3.90%	0	19,824	19.39%	1	3,483	3.41%	0	18,960	18.55%	1
2010	5,075	5.07%	0	36,520	36.46%	3	5,289	5.28%	0	5,771	5.76%	0	5,431	5.42%	0	27,387	27.34%	2	3,973	3.97%	0	9,830	9.81%	0
2006	5,193	5.42%	0	40,532	42.32%	3	3,505	3.66%	0	6,855	7.16%	0	6,105	6.37%	0	21,109	22.04%	2	4,964	5.18%	0	5,945	6.21%	0
2002	7,827	8.28%	0	43,178	45.66%	3	3,631	3.84%	0	5,777	6.11%	0	10,470	11.07%	1	12,467	13.18%	1	8,319	8.80%	0	2,634	2.79%	0
1998	12,282	13.10%	1	39,762	42.41%	3	3,672	3.92%	0	4,923	5.25%	0	3,401	3.63%	0	18,040	19.24%	1	10,330	11.02%	1			
1994	6,505	6.49%	0	53,000	52.88%	4	4,430	4.42%	0	7,629	7.61%	0	5,178	5.17%	0	18,573	18.53%	2	3,285	3.28%	0			
1991	4,114	4.15%	0	45,679	46.04%	4	2,808	2.83%	0	8,975	9.05%	1	7,403	7.46%	0	17,986	18.13%	1	6,170	6.22%	0			
1988	4,713	4.79%	0	51,412	52.24%	4	5,235	5.32%	0	11,120	11.30%	1	9,466	9.62%	0	13,573	13.79%	1	2,746	2.79%	0			
1985	4,550	4.43%	0	53,026	51.61%	3	1,365	1.33%	0	12,791	12.45%	1	12,778	12.44%	1	18,067	17.58%	1	with C					
1982	4,151	4.02%	0	54,462	52.74%	4	1,194	1.16%	0	16,134	15.62%	1	5,802	5.62%	0	19,457	18.84%	1	1,961	1.90%	0			
1979	4,023	3.90%	0	51,443	49.93%	3				16,967	16.47%	1	11,638	11.29%	1	17,134	16.63%	1	1,448	1.41%	0			
1976	3,435	3.33%	0	51,122	49.51%	3				22,674	21.96%	1	10,852	10.51%	1	13,024	12.61%	1	1,545	1.50%	0			
1973	4,082	4.15%	0	48,778	49.56%	3				22,515	22.88%	2	9,264	9.41%	0	11,784	11.97%	1	1,744	1.77%	0			
1970	3,963	4.15%	0	48,021	50.24%	4				17,908	18.74%	1	14,550	15.22%	1	9,458	9.90%	0	1,545	1.62%	0			

(Excludes levelling seats. Figures in italics represent alliances/joint lists.)

=== Detailed ===
Party has received at least 4% of the vote nationally and is entitled to compete for constituency seats.

==== 2020s ====
===== 2026 =====
Results of the 2026 general election held on 13 September 2026:

Party		Votes per municipality					Total votes	%	Seats		
Party		Karls- hamn	Karls- krona	Olof- ström	Ronne- by	Sölves- borg	Total votes	%	Con.	Lev.	Tot.
Swedish Social Democratic Party	S	6,121	13,387	2,385	5,159	2,840	29,892	28.66%	2	0	2
Sweden Democrats	SD	5,236	9,130	2,322	4,900	3,879	25,467	24.41%	2	0	2
Moderate Party	M	3,596	9,055	1,242	2,945	2,254	19,092	18.30%	1	0	1
Christian Democrats	KD	1,445	3,307	465	1,490	894	7,601	7.29%	0	0	0
Left Party	V	1,315	2,533	486	1,336	443	6,113	5.86%	0	0	0
Centre Party	C	1,084	2,708	362	1,056	462	5,672	5.44%	0	0	0
Liberals	L	898	2,406	286	865	611	5,066	4.86%	0	0	0
Green Party	MP	882	2,006	173	661	263	3,985	3.82%	0	0	0
Alternative for Sweden	AfS	98	214	52	83	47	494	0.47%	0	0	0
Örebro Party	ÖP	58	141	53	92	58	402	0.39%	0	0	0
Pirate Party	PP	12	53	12	20	5	102	0.10%	0	0	0
Christian Values Party	KrVP	11	40	15	18	17	101	0.10%	0	0	0
Ambition Sweden	AS	11	41	18	12	15	97	0.09%	0	0	0
Citizens' Coalition	MED	19	41	1	13	10	84	0.08%	0	0	0
Human Rights and Democracy	MoD	29	17	0	3	8	57	0.05%	0	0	0
Direct Democrats	DD	6	4	3	6	1	20	0.02%	0	0	0
Communist Party of Sweden	SKP	3	9	2	2	1	17	0.02%	0	0	0
Nordic Resistance Movement	NMR	3	4	0	0	2	9	0.01%	0	0	0
United Voice	ER	0	5	1	1	1	8	0.01%	0	0	0
Independent Rural Party	LPo	1	1	0	2	1	5	0.00%	0	0	0
Donald Duck Party		0	2	1	1	0	4	0.00%	0	0	0
The Push Buttons	Kn	0	2	0	0	2	4	0.00%	0	0	0
Classical Liberal Party	KLP	0	1	1	0	1	3	0.00%	0	0	0
Turning Point Party	PV	0	0	0	3	0	3	0.00%	0	0	0
Animal Lovers' Party		1	0	1	0	0	2	0.00%	0	0	0
For the Good of All		0	0	0	0	2	2	0.00%	0	0	0
Unity	ENH	0	0	0	2	0	2	0.00%	0	0	0
A Good Sweden		0	0	0	1	0	1	0.00%	0	0	0
AI Party		1	0	0	0	0	1	0.00%	0	0	0
O		0	1	0	0	0	1	0.00%	0	0	0
RegleraAI.nu		0	1	0	0	0	1	0.00%	0	0	0
Resource Democracy		0	1	0	0	0	1	0.00%	0	0	0
Valid votes		20,830	45,110	7,881	18,671	11,817	104,309	100.00%	5	0	5
Blank votes		263	437	90	212	154	1,156	1.09%			
Rejected votes – unregistered parties		7	9	1	1	2	20	0.02%			
Rejected votes – other		15	57	5	19	11	107	0.10%			
Total polled		21,115	45,613	7,977	18,903	11,984	105,592	85.61%			
Registered electors		24,947	52,206	9,924	22,186	14,073	123,336				
Turnout		84.64%	87.37%	80.38%	85.20%	85.16%	85.61%				

The following candidates were elected:

- Constituency seats (personal mandates) - Heléne Björklund (S), 2,200 votes.
- Constituency seats (party mandates) - Åsa Coenraads (M), 761 votes; Magnus Johansson (S), 595 votes; Richard Jomshof (SD), 373 votes; and Karolina Widerberg (SD), 92 votes.

===== 2022 =====
Results of the 2022 general election held on 11 September 2022:

Party		Votes per municipality					Total votes	%	Seats		
Party		Karls- hamn	Karls- krona	Olof- ström	Ronne- by	Sölves- borg	Total votes	%	Con.	Lev.	Tot.
Swedish Social Democratic Party	S	6,671	14,051	2,678	5,699	3,156	32,255	31.14%	2	0	2
Sweden Democrats	SD	6,051	10,737	2,817	5,762	4,189	29,556	28.53%	2	0	2
Moderate Party	M	3,737	8,386	1,083	3,024	2,270	18,500	17.86%	1	0	1
Christian Democrats	KD	1,032	2,603	401	999	700	5,735	5.54%	0	0	0
Centre Party	C	992	2,376	365	846	435	5,014	4.84%	0	0	0
Left Party	V	967	2,014	375	865	379	4,600	4.44%	0	0	0
Liberals	L	640	1,875	165	604	353	3,637	3.51%	0	0	0
Green Party	MP	692	1,494	162	456	211	3,015	2.91%	0	0	0
Alternative for Sweden	AfS	55	138	27	61	31	312	0.30%	0	0	0
Nuance Party	PNy	25	70	8	117	6	226	0.22%	0	0	0
Citizens' Coalition	MED	25	99	5	23	20	172	0.17%	0	0	0
Pirate Party	PP	30	63	10	20	11	134	0.13%	0	0	0
Christian Values Party	KrVP	20	41	6	3	13	83	0.08%	0	0	0
The Push Buttons	Kn	28	22	6	12	10	78	0.08%	0	0	0
Human Rights and Democracy	MoD	16	34	3	5	17	75	0.07%	0	0	0
Direct Democrats	DD	6	13	5	26	2	52	0.05%	0	0	0
Feminist Initiative	FI	14	13	0	7	3	37	0.04%	0	0	0
Independent Rural Party	LPo	3	16	0	5	1	25	0.02%	0	0	0
Unity	ENH	3	9	0	6	1	19	0.02%	0	0	0
Climate Alliance	KA	4	6	0	2	6	18	0.02%	0	0	0
Nordic Resistance Movement	NMR	3	7	0	2	0	12	0.01%	0	0	0
Classical Liberal Party	KLP	0	3	1	0	0	4	0.00%	0	0	0
Donald Duck Party		1	3	0	0	0	4	0.00%	0	0	0
Volt Sweden	Volt	0	3	0	0	1	4	0.00%	0	0	0
Communist Party of Sweden	SKP	0	1	0	0	2	3	0.00%	0	0	0
Hard Line Sweden		0	2	0	1	0	3	0.00%	0	0	0
National Law of Sweden		0	0	0	0	2	2	0.00%	0	0	0
Socialist Welfare Party	S-V	0	2	0	0	0	2	0.00%	0	0	0
Basic Income Party	BASIP	0	1	0	0	0	1	0.00%	0	0	0
Freedom Party		0	0	0	0	1	1	0.00%	0	0	0
Turning Point Party	PV	0	0	0	1	0	1	0.00%	0	0	0
Valid votes		21,015	44,082	8,117	18,546	11,820	103,580	100.00%	5	0	5
Blank votes		263	468	104	171	145	1,151	1.10%			
Rejected votes – unregistered parties		3	2	1	4	5	15	0.01%			
Rejected votes – other		15	44	7	18	16	100	0.10%			
Total polled		21,296	44,596	8,229	18,739	11,986	104,846	86.09%			
Registered electors		24,986	50,805	10,168	21,933	13,897	121,789				
Turnout		85.23%	87.78%	80.93%	85.44%	86.25%	86.09%				

The following candidates were elected:

- Constituency seats (personal mandates) - Heléne Björklund (S), 2,227 votes; and Camilla Brunsberg (M), 1,693 votes.
- Constituency seats (party mandates) - Ann-Christine From Utterstedt (SD), 0 votes; Richard Jomshof (SD), 181 votes; and Magnus Manhammar (S), 1,304 votes.

==== 2010s ====
===== 2018 =====
Results of the 2018 general election held on 9 September 2018:

Party		Votes per municipality					Total votes	%	Seats		
Party		Karls- hamn	Karls- krona	Olof- ström	Ronne- by	Sölves- borg	Total votes	%	Con.	Lev.	Tot.
Swedish Social Democratic Party	S	7,073	13,845	3,054	5,573	3,279	32,824	31.41%	2	0	2
Sweden Democrats	SD	5,218	9,553	2,407	5,483	3,681	26,342	25.20%	2	0	2
Moderate Party	M	3,632	8,134	1,002	3,024	2,246	18,038	17.26%	1	0	1
Centre Party	C	1,392	3,177	542	1,313	670	7,094	6.79%	0	0	0
Christian Democrats	KD	1,095	2,758	410	969	722	5,954	5.70%	0	0	0
Left Party	V	1,306	2,458	472	1,027	436	5,699	5.45%	0	0	0
Liberals	L	727	2,304	192	603	371	4,197	4.02%	0	0	0
Green Party	MP	718	1,503	160	398	246	3,025	2.89%	0	0	0
Feminist Initiative	FI	95	139	20	61	36	351	0.34%	0	0	0
Alternative for Sweden	AfS	66	103	28	64	24	285	0.27%	0	0	0
Citizens' Coalition	MED	18	112	7	33	13	183	0.18%	0	0	0
Pirate Party	PP	34	71	6	21	15	147	0.14%	0	0	0
Direct Democrats	DD	21	49	9	31	5	115	0.11%	0	0	0
Unity	ENH	11	36	4	13	4	68	0.07%	0	0	0
Independent Rural Party	LPo	14	8	9	7	19	57	0.05%	0	0	0
Christian Values Party	KrVP	7	23	2	1	11	44	0.04%	0	0	0
Nordic Resistance Movement	NMR	2	9	3	7	3	24	0.02%	0	0	0
Animal Party	DjuP	3	9	3	6	1	22	0.02%	0	0	0
Basic Income Party	BASIP	2	7	1	0	3	13	0.01%	0	0	0
Classical Liberal Party	KLP	1	6	2	0	2	11	0.01%	0	0	0
Initiative	INI	2	8	0	0	0	10	0.01%	0	0	0
Scania Party	SKÅ	0	1	0	0	0	1	0.00%	0	0	0
Security Party	TRP	0	0	1	0	0	1	0.00%	0	0	0
Parties not on the ballot		2	4	3	0	0	9	0.01%	0	0	0
Valid votes		21,439	44,317	8,337	18,634	11,787	104,514	100.00%	5	0	5
Blank votes		226	401	96	158	131	1,012	0.96%			
Rejected votes – unregistered parties		5	11	6	3	4	29	0.03%			
Rejected votes – other		10	24	4	15	8	61	0.06%			
Total polled		21,680	44,753	8,443	18,810	11,930	105,616	88.47%			
Registered electors		24,694	49,784	9,930	21,450	13,518	119,376				
Turnout		87.79%	89.89%	85.03%	87.69%	88.25%	88.47%				

The following candidates were elected:

- Constituency seats (personal mandates) - Heléne Björklund (S), 2,232 votes; Annicka Engblom (M), 1,501 votes; and Magnus Manhammar (S), 1,741 votes.
- Constituency seats (party mandates) - Angelika Bengtsson (SD), 5 votes; and Richard Jomshof (SD), 252 votes.

===== 2014 =====
Results of the 2014 general election held on 14 September 2014:

Party		Votes per municipality					Total votes	%	Seats		
Party		Karls- hamn	Karls- krona	Olof- ström	Ronne- by	Sölves- borg	Total votes	%	Con.	Lev.	Tot.
Swedish Social Democratic Party	S	8,114	15,522	3,839	6,731	3,775	37,981	37.15%	3	0	3
Moderate Party	M	3,923	8,848	1,123	3,335	2,595	19,824	19.39%	1	0	1
Sweden Democrats	SD	3,867	6,603	1,602	4,028	2,860	18,960	18.55%	1	0	1
Centre Party	C	1,015	2,493	473	1,289	522	5,792	5.67%	0	0	0
Green Party	MP	1,192	2,309	295	732	441	4,969	4.86%	0	0	0
Left Party	V	1,044	1,954	413	972	363	4,746	4.64%	0	0	0
Liberal People's Party	FP	616	2,225	168	653	322	3,984	3.90%	0	0	0
Christian Democrats	KD	647	1,674	287	534	341	3,483	3.41%	0	0	0
Feminist Initiative	FI	430	755	97	274	145	1,701	1.66%	0	0	0
Pirate Party	PP	69	182	25	62	29	367	0.36%	0	0	0
Unity	ENH	20	54	10	30	7	121	0.12%	0	0	0
Animal Party	DjuP	28	17	3	25	8	81	0.08%	0	0	0
Party of the Swedes	SVP	6	44	11	9	9	79	0.08%	0	0	0
Christian Values Party	KrVP	3	10	12	1	8	34	0.03%	0	0	0
Independent Rural Party	LPo	3	2	2	8	4	19	0.02%	0	0	0
Classical Liberal Party	KLP	5	9	2	0	1	17	0.02%	0	0	0
Direct Democrats	DD	1	5	1	7	2	16	0.02%	0	0	0
Swedish Senior Citizen Interest Party	SPI	1	2	0	2	3	8	0.01%	0	0	0
Progressive Party		0	0	4	0	0	4	0.00%	0	0	0
Health Party		0	0	2	0	0	2	0.00%	0	0	0
Communist Party of Sweden	SKP	0	0	0	1	0	1	0.00%	0	0	0
Parties not on the ballot		8	19	3	2	4	36	0.04%	0	0	0
Valid votes		20,992	42,727	8,372	18,695	11,439	102,225	100.00%	5	0	5
Blank votes		218	364	111	169	112	974	0.94%			
Rejected votes – other		3	4	7	5	2	21	0.02%			
Total polled		21,213	43,095	8,490	18,869	11,553	103,220	86.84%			
Registered electors		24,702	49,012	10,131	21,746	13,273	118,864				
Turnout		85.88%	87.93%	83.80%	86.77%	87.04%	86.84%				

The following candidates were elected:

- Constituency seats (personal mandates) - Annicka Engblom (M), 4,693 votes; and Magnus Manhammar (S), 2,937 votes.
- Constituency seats (party mandates) - Peter Jeppsson (S), 1,599 votes; Richard Jomshof (SD), 321 votes; and Suzanne Svensson (S), 783 votes.

===== 2010 =====
Results of the 2010 general election held on 19 September 2010:

Party		Votes per municipality					Total votes	%	Seats		
Party		Karls- hamn	Karls- krona	Olof- ström	Ronne- by	Sölves- borg	Total votes	%	Con.	Lev.	Tot.
Swedish Social Democratic Party	S	7,709	14,651	3,859	6,478	3,823	36,520	36.46%	3	0	3
Moderate Party	M	5,426	11,905	1,552	5,006	3,498	27,387	27.34%	2	0	2
Sweden Democrats	SD	1,947	3,682	802	2,042	1,357	9,830	9.81%	0	1	1
Centre Party	C	1,023	2,304	502	1,407	535	5,771	5.76%	0	0	0
Liberal People's Party	FP	1,099	2,695	300	878	459	5,431	5.42%	0	0	0
Green Party	MP	1,299	2,312	299	929	450	5,289	5.28%	0	0	0
Left Party	V	1,253	1,814	462	1,098	448	5,075	5.07%	0	0	0
Christian Democrats	KD	722	1,777	373	662	439	3,973	3.97%	0	0	0
Pirate Party	PP	130	223	46	118	71	588	0.59%	0	0	0
Feminist Initiative	FI	34	104	11	48	17	214	0.21%	0	0	0
Unity	ENH	7	4	1	1	1	14	0.01%	0	0	0
Sweden's National Democratic Party	SNDP	6	0	1	0	0	7	0.01%	0	0	0
Freedom Party		3	0	0	1	2	6	0.01%	0	0	0
National Democrats	ND	1	1	2	1	1	6	0.01%	0	0	0
Party of the Swedes	SVP	1	3	0	2	0	6	0.01%	0	0	0
Classical Liberal Party	KLP	1	2	1	0	1	5	0.00%	0	0	0
Swedish Senior Citizen Interest Party	SPI	0	1	1	1	1	4	0.00%	0	0	0
Socialist Justice Party	RS	0	0	0	2	0	2	0.00%	0	0	0
Spirits Party		0	1	1	0	0	2	0.00%	0	0	0
Communist Party of Sweden	SKP	0	1	0	0	0	1	0.00%	0	0	0
European Workers Party	EAP	0	1	0	0	0	1	0.00%	0	0	0
Freedom of the Justice Party	FRP	0	1	0	0	0	1	0.00%	0	0	0
Health Care Party	Sjvåp	1	0	0	0	0	1	0.00%	0	0	0
Parties not on the ballot		4	10	4	4	6	28	0.03%	0	0	0
Valid votes		20,666	41,492	8,217	18,678	11,109	100,162	100.00%	5	1	6
Blank votes		272	535	108	240	150	1,305	1.29%			
Rejected votes – other		7	14	8	4	4	37	0.04%			
Total polled		20,945	42,041	8,333	18,922	11,263	101,504	85.82%			
Registered electors		24,606	48,178	10,130	22,114	13,251	118,279				
Turnout		85.12%	87.26%	82.26%	85.57%	85.00%	85.82%				

The following candidates were elected:

- Constituency seats (personal mandates) - Annicka Engblom (M), 2,554 votes.
- Constituency seats (party mandates) - Kerstin Haglö (S), 827 votes; Peter Jeppsson (S), 1,426 votes; Gustav Nilsson (M), 700 votes; and Suzanne Svensson (S), 991 votes.
- Levelling seats (party mandates) - Jonas Åkerlund (SD), 17 votes.

==== 2000s ====
===== 2006 =====
Results of the 2006 general election held on 17 September 2006:

Party		Votes per municipality					Total votes	%	Seats		
Party		Karls- hamn	Karls- krona	Olof- ström	Ronne- by	Sölves- borg	Total votes	%	Con.	Lev.	Tot.
Swedish Social Democratic Party	S	8,827	15,782	4,059	7,570	4,294	40,532	42.32%	3	0	3
Moderate Party	M	3,912	9,330	1,142	3,888	2,837	21,109	22.04%	2	0	2
Centre Party	C	1,288	2,810	543	1,634	580	6,855	7.16%	0	0	0
Liberal People's Party	FP	1,179	2,956	416	1,067	487	6,105	6.37%	0	0	0
Sweden Democrats	SD	1,252	2,325	482	1,065	821	5,945	6.21%	0	0	0
Left Party	V	1,332	1,761	496	1,128	476	5,193	5.42%	0	0	0
Christian Democrats	KD	898	2,297	410	824	535	4,964	5.18%	0	0	0
Green Party	MP	834	1,623	192	618	238	3,505	3.66%	0	0	0
Feminist Initiative	FI	118	199	44	90	53	504	0.53%	0	0	0
Pirate Party	PP	68	199	24	118	64	473	0.49%	0	0	0
June List		57	124	38	117	25	361	0.38%	0	0	0
Swedish Senior Citizen Interest Party	SPI	20	38	14	14	12	98	0.10%	0	0	0
National Socialist Front	NSF	1	24	0	23	5	53	0.06%	0	0	0
Unity	ENH	8	7	3	2	2	22	0.02%	0	0	0
Health Care Party	Sjvåp	3	2	1	6	3	15	0.02%	0	0	0
People's Will		3	1	0	0	7	11	0.01%	0	0	0
Classical Liberal Party	KLP	6	2	0	0	2	10	0.01%	0	0	0
National Democrats	ND	1	5	0	1	0	7	0.01%	0	0	0
New Future	NYF	0	3	0	0	0	3	0.00%	0	0	0
Freedom of the Justice Party	FRP	0	1	0	0	0	1	0.00%	0	0	0
Unique Party		0	1	0	0	0	1	0.00%	0	0	0
Partiet.se		0	1	0	0	0	1	0.00%	0	0	0
Rikshushållarna		1	0	0	0	0	1	0.00%	0	0	0
Other parties		1	6	1	3	1	12	0.01%	0	0	0
Valid votes		19,809	39,497	7,865	18,168	10,442	95,781	100.00%	5	0	5
Blank votes		450	725	166	351	224	1,916	1.96%			
Rejected votes – other		6	15	5	6	5	37	0.04%			
Total polled		20,265	40,237	8,036	18,525	10,671	97,734	83.08%			
Registered electors		24,616	47,554	10,081	22,398	12,994	117,643				
Turnout		82.32%	84.61%	79.71%	82.71%	82.12%	83.08%				

The following candidates were elected:

- Constituency seats (personal mandates) - Annicka Engblom (M), 1,866 votes; and Jeppe Johnsson (M), 2,632 votes.
- Constituency seats (party mandates) - Kerstin Andersson (S), 1,116 votes; Jan Björkman (S), 1,513 votes; and Peter Jeppsson (S), 1,470 votes.

Permanent substitutions:

- Jeppe Johnsson (M) resigned on 16 August 2009 and was replaced by Gustav Nilsson (M) on the same day.

===== 2002 =====
Results of the 2002 general election held on 15 September 2002:

Party		Votes per municipality					Total votes	%	Seats		
Party		Karls- hamn	Karls- krona	Olof- ström	Ronne- by	Sölves- borg	Total votes	%	Con.	Lev.	Tot.
Swedish Social Democratic Party	S	9,176	17,172	4,127	8,188	4,515	43,178	45.66%	3	0	3
Moderate Party	M	2,235	5,426	652	2,287	1,867	12,467	13.18%	1	0	1
Liberal People's Party	FP	2,000	4,876	747	1,910	937	10,470	11.07%	1	0	1
Christian Democrats	KD	1,442	3,884	719	1,399	875	8,319	8.80%	0	1	1
Left Party	V	1,994	2,820	690	1,614	709	7,827	8.28%	0	0	0
Centre Party	C	1,052	2,393	503	1,321	508	5,777	6.11%	0	0	0
Green Party	MP	881	1,557	220	675	298	3,631	3.84%	0	0	0
Sweden Democrats	SD	532	1,040	255	537	270	2,634	2.79%	0	0	0
New Future	NYF	4	6	15	2	15	42	0.04%	0	0	0
Popular Democrats	FDEM	0	10	0	2	0	12	0.01%	0	0	0
Unity	ENH	0	4	0	2	1	7	0.01%	0	0	0
Norrbotten Party	NBP	0	4	0	1	0	5	0.01%	0	0	0
Socialist Party	SOC.P	0	3	0	0	1	4	0.00%	0	0	0
Rikshushållarna		0	1	0	0	0	1	0.00%	0	0	0
Other parties		30	81	18	36	19	184	0.19%	0	0	0
Valid votes		19,346	39,277	7,946	17,974	10,015	94,558	100.00%	5	1	6
Rejected votes		383	549	119	342	215	1,608	1.67%			
Total polled		19,729	39,826	8,065	18,316	10,230	96,166	82.35%			
Registered electors		24,259	47,127	10,181	22,449	12,760	116,776				
Turnout		81.33%	84.51%	79.22%	81.59%	80.17%	82.35%				

The following candidates were elected:

- Constituency seats (personal mandates) - Jeppe Johnsson (M), 2,514 votes.
- Constituency seats (party mandates) - Kerstin Andersson (S), 1,186 votes; Heli Berg (FP), 622 votes; Jan Björkman (S), 2,057 votes; and Christer Skoog (S), 1,421 votes.
- Levelling seats (personal mandates) - Johnny Gylling (KD), 1,372 votes.

==== 1990s ====
===== 1998 =====
Results of the 1998 general election held on 20 September 1998:

Party		Votes per municipality					Total votes	%	Seats		
Party		Karls- hamn	Karls- krona	Olof- ström	Ronne- by	Sölves- borg	Total votes	%	Con.	Lev.	Tot.
Swedish Social Democratic Party	S	8,664	15,232	3,988	7,569	4,309	39,762	42.41%	3	0	3
Moderate Party	M	3,263	8,032	1,063	3,504	2,178	18,040	19.24%	1	0	1
Left Party	V	2,983	4,565	1,126	2,496	1,112	12,282	13.10%	1	0	1
Christian Democrats	KD	1,906	4,662	854	1,875	1,033	10,330	11.02%	1	0	1
Centre Party	C	870	1,966	465	1,190	432	4,923	5.25%	0	0	0
Green Party	MP	907	1,453	355	673	284	3,672	3.92%	0	0	0
Liberal People's Party	FP	618	1,621	256	651	255	3,401	3.63%	0	0	0
Other parties		253	598	97	188	210	1,346	1.44%	0	0	0
Valid votes		19,464	38,129	8,204	18,146	9,813	93,756	100.00%	6	0	6
Rejected votes		512	963	202	450	292	2,419	2.52%			
Total polled		19,976	39,092	8,406	18,596	10,105	96,175	82.30%			
Registered electors		24,344	46,644	10,663	22,574	12,636	116,861				
Turnout		82.06%	83.81%	78.83%	82.38%	79.97%	82.30%				

The following candidates were elected:

- Constituency seats (personal mandates) - Jeppe Johnsson (M), 2,150 votes.
- Constituency seats (party mandates) - Jan Björkman (S), 1,830 votes; Johnny Gylling (KD), 401 votes; Karin Olsson (S), 790 votes; Christer Skoog (S), 1,267 votes; and Willy Söderdahl (V), 631 votes.

===== 1994 =====
Results of the 1994 general election held on 18 September 1994:

Party		Votes per municipality					Total votes	%	Seats		
Party		Karls- hamn	Karls- krona	Olof- ström	Ronne- by	Sölves- borg	Total votes	%	Con.	Lev.	Tot.
Swedish Social Democratic Party	S	11,963	19,651	5,318	10,368	5,700	53,000	52.88%	4	0	4
Moderate Party	M	3,306	8,295	1,203	3,592	2,177	18,573	18.53%	2	0	2
Centre Party	C	1,267	3,215	625	1,813	709	7,629	7.61%	0	0	0
Left Party	V	1,589	2,523	624	1,224	545	6,505	6.49%	0	0	0
Liberal People's Party	FP	1,047	2,359	439	885	448	5,178	5.17%	0	0	0
Green Party	MP	1,067	1,787	393	779	404	4,430	4.42%	0	0	0
Christian Democratic Unity	KDS	629	1,497	348	450	361	3,285	3.28%	0	0	0
New Democracy	NyD	199	464	74	159	165	1,061	1.06%	0	0	0
Other parties		96	230	76	99	73	574	0.57%	0	0	0
Valid votes		21,163	40,021	9,100	19,369	10,582	100,235	100.00%	6	0	6
Rejected votes		358	669	157	260	188	1,632	1.60%			
Total polled		21,521	40,690	9,257	19,629	10,770	101,867	87.58%			
Registered electors		24,464	46,147	10,836	22,413	12,447	116,307				
Turnout		87.97%	88.17%	85.43%	87.58%	86.53%	87.58%				

The following candidates were elected: Jan Björkman (S); Jeppe Johnsson (M); Karin Olsson (S); Yvonne Sandberg-Fries (S); Christer Skoog (S); and Karl-Gösta Svenson (M).

Permanent substitutions:

- Yvonne Sandberg-Fries (S) resigned on 17 September 1996 and was replaced by Magnus Johansson (S) on the same day.

===== 1991 =====
Results of the 1991 general election held on 15 September 1991:

Party		Votes per municipality					Total votes	%	Seats		
Party		Karls- hamn	Karls- krona	Olof- ström	Ronne- by	Sölves- borg	Total votes	%	Con.	Lev.	Tot.
Swedish Social Democratic Party	S	10,329	16,742	4,703	9,101	4,804	45,679	46.04%	4	0	4
Moderate Party	M	3,315	7,970	1,228	3,288	2,185	17,986	18.13%	1	0	1
Centre Party	C	1,527	3,650	834	2,172	792	8,975	9.05%	1	0	1
Liberal People's Party	FP	1,438	3,395	613	1,300	657	7,403	7.46%	0	0	0
Christian Democratic Unity	KDS	1,244	2,717	610	967	632	6,170	6.22%	0	0	0
New Democracy	NyD	890	1,857	327	882	645	4,601	4.64%	0	0	0
Left Party	V	1,083	1,589	415	738	289	4,114	4.15%	0	0	0
Green Party	MP	688	1,058	270	500	292	2,808	2.83%	0	0	0
Other parties		386	598	76	297	115	1,472	1.48%	0	0	0
Valid votes		20,900	39,576	9,076	19,245	10,411	99,208	100.00%	6	0	6
Rejected votes		419	637	188	263	184	1,691	1.68%			
Total polled		21,319	40,213	9,264	19,508	10,595	100,899	87.48%			
Registered electors		24,435	45,611	10,881	22,222	12,185	115,334				
Turnout		87.25%	88.17%	85.14%	87.79%	86.95%	87.48%				

The following candidates were elected: Jan Björkman (S); Hans Gustafsson (S); Sven-Olof Petersson (C); Yvonne Sandberg-Fries (S); Christer Skoog (S); and Karl-Gösta Svenson (M).

==== 1980s ====
===== 1988 =====
Results of the 1988 general election held on 18 September 1988:

Party		Votes per municipality					Total votes	%	Seats		
Party		Karls- hamn	Karls- krona	Olof- ström	Ronne- by	Sölves- borg	Total votes	%	Con.	Lev.	Tot.
Swedish Social Democratic Party	S	11,381	19,329	5,325	10,124	5,253	51,412	52.24%	4	0	4
Moderate Party	M	2,506	5,994	889	2,408	1,776	13,573	13.79%	1	0	1
Centre Party	C	1,938	4,462	978	2,639	1,103	11,120	11.30%	1	0	1
Liberal People's Party	FP	1,877	4,310	738	1,654	887	9,466	9.62%	0	0	0
Green Party	MP	1,160	1,989	452	1,013	621	5,235	5.32%	0	0	0
Left Party – Communists	VPK	1,294	1,836	479	803	301	4,713	4.79%	0	0	0
Christian Democratic Unity	KDS	583	1,217	335	332	279	2,746	2.79%	0	0	0
Other parties		26	93	8	19	13	159	0.16%	0	0	0
Valid votes		20,765	39,230	9,204	18,992	10,233	98,424	100.00%	6	0	6
Rejected votes		267	418	128	208	127	1,148	1.15%			
Total polled		21,032	39,648	9,332	19,200	10,360	99,572	87.02%			
Registered electors		24,321	45,284	10,823	22,025	11,977	114,430				
Turnout		86.48%	87.55%	86.22%	87.17%	86.50%	87.02%				

The following candidates were elected: Jan Björkman (S); Hans Gustafsson (S); Sven-Olof Petersson (C); Yvonne Sandberg-Fries (S); Christer Skoog (S); and Karl-Gösta Svenson (M).

===== 1985 =====
Results of the 1985 general election held on 15 September 1985:

Party		Votes per municipality					Total votes	%	Seats		
Party		Karls- hamn	Karls- krona	Olof- ström	Ronne- by	Sölves- borg	Total votes	%	Con.	Lev.	Tot.
Swedish Social Democratic Party	S	11,704	20,193	5,301	10,462	5,366	53,026	51.61%	3	0	3
Moderate Party	M	3,401	7,844	1,249	3,296	2,277	18,067	17.58%	1	0	1
Centre Party	C	2,359	5,077	1,273	2,821	1,261	12,791	12.45%	1	0	1
Liberal People's Party	FP	2,503	5,708	1,071	2,240	1,256	12,778	12.44%	1	0	1
Left Party – Communists	VPK	1,259	1,721	474	769	327	4,550	4.43%	0	0	0
Green Party	MP	286	515	115	304	145	1,365	1.33%	0	0	0
Other parties		31	77	13	31	22	174	0.17%	0	0	0
Valid votes		21,543	41,135	9,496	19,923	10,654	102,751	100.00%	6	0	6
Rejected votes		185	336	76	140	90	827	0.80%			
Total polled		21,728	41,471	9,572	20,063	10,744	103,578	89.91%			
Registered electors		24,336	45,977	10,731	22,240	11,921	115,205				
Turnout		89.28%	90.20%	89.20%	90.21%	90.13%	89.91%				

The following candidates were elected: Lennart Alsén (FP); Hans Gustafsson (S); Ralf Lindström (S); Karl-Anders Petersson, (C); Yvonne Sandberg-Fries (S); and Karl-Gösta Svenson (M).

===== 1982 =====
Results of the 1982 general election held on 19 September 1982:

Party		Votes per municipality					Total votes	%	Seats		
Party		Karls- hamn	Karls- krona	Olof- ström	Ronne- by	Sölves- borg	Total votes	%	Con.	Lev.	Tot.
Swedish Social Democratic Party	S	11,797	20,848	5,405	10,923	5,489	54,462	52.74%	4	0	4
Moderate Party	M	3,763	8,429	1,365	3,488	2,412	19,457	18.84%	1	0	1
Centre Party	C	2,981	6,279	1,549	3,728	1,597	16,134	15.62%	1	0	1
Liberal People's Party	FP	1,068	2,748	487	908	591	5,802	5.62%	0	0	0
Left Party – Communists	VPK	1,145	1,569	415	702	320	4,151	4.02%	0	0	0
Christian Democratic Unity	KDS	474	892	248	169	178	1,961	1.90%	0	0	0
Green Party	MP	273	479	96	251	95	1,194	1.16%	0	0	0
K-Party	K-P	2	7	20	3	1	33	0.03%	0	0	0
Other parties		22	20	7	12	7	68	0.07%	0	0	0
Valid votes		21,525	41,271	9,592	20,184	10,690	103,262	100.00%	6	0	6
Rejected votes		168	362	56	145	82	813	0.78%			
Total polled		21,693	41,633	9,648	20,329	10,772	104,075	91.50%			
Registered electors		23,896	45,489	10,521	22,080	11,762	113,748				
Turnout		90.78%	91.52%	91.70%	92.07%	91.58%	91.50%				

The following candidates were elected: Claes Elmstedt (C); Hans Gustafsson (S); Ralf Lindström (S); Mats Olsson (S); Yvonne Sandberg-Fries (S); and Hans Wachtmeister (M).

Permanent substitutions:

- Claes Elmstedt (C) resigned on 31 March 1984 after being appointed Governor of Gotland County and was replaced by Karl-Anders Petersson (C) on 1 April 1984.

==== 1970s ====
===== 1979 =====
Results of the 1979 general election held on 16 September 1979:

Party		Votes per municipality					Total votes	%	Seats		
Party		Karls- hamn	Karls- krona	Olof- ström	Ronne- by	Sölves- borg	Total votes	%	Con.	Lev.	Tot.
Swedish Social Democratic Party	S	10,994	19,885	5,061	10,361	5,142	51,443	49.93%	3	0	3
Moderate Party	M	3,254	7,446	1,230	2,988	2,216	17,134	16.63%	1	0	1
Centre Party	C	3,208	6,496	1,576	4,049	1,638	16,967	16.47%	1	0	1
Liberal People's Party	FP	2,200	5,547	959	1,796	1,136	11,638	11.29%	1	0	1
Left Party – Communists	VPK	1,178	1,428	409	674	334	4,023	3.90%	0	0	0
Christian Democratic Unity	KDS	309	663	192	122	162	1,448	1.41%	0	0	0
Communist Party of Sweden	SKP	48	45	20	31	0	144	0.14%	0	0	0
Workers' Party – The Communists	APK	5	4	33	4	3	49	0.05%	0	0	0
Other parties		32	88	13	39	19	191	0.19%	0	0	0
Valid votes		21,228	41,602	9,493	20,064	10,650	103,037	100.00%	6	0	6
Rejected votes		128	183	34	84	43	472	0.46%			
Total polled		21,356	41,785	9,527	20,148	10,693	103,509	91.20%			
Registered electors		23,612	45,772	10,401	22,011	11,695	113,491				
Turnout		90.45%	91.29%	91.60%	91.54%	91.43%	91.20%				

The following candidates were elected: Claes Elmstedt (C); Hans Gustafsson (S); Margot Håkansson (F); Helge Karlsson (S); Ralf Lindström (S); and Hans Wachtmeister (M).

===== 1976 =====
Results of the 1976 general election held on 19 September 1976:

Party		Votes per municipality					Total votes	%	Seats		
Party		Karls- hamn	Karls- krona	Olof- ström	Ronne- by	Sölves- borg	Total votes	%	Con.	Lev.	Tot.
Swedish Social Democratic Party	S	10,854	19,993	4,920	10,164	5,191	51,122	49.51%	3	0	3
Centre Party	C	4,418	8,513	2,251	5,215	2,277	22,674	21.96%	1	1	2
Moderate Party	M	2,451	5,691	974	2,282	1,626	13,024	12.61%	1	0	1
People's Party	F	1,895	5,412	800	1,685	1,060	10,852	10.51%	1	0	1
Left Party – Communists	VPK	1,026	1,157	381	575	296	3,435	3.33%	0	0	0
Christian Democratic Unity	KDS	414	616	219	166	130	1,545	1.50%	0	0	0
Communist Party of Sweden	SKP	63	95	31	67	2	258	0.25%	0	0	0
Other parties		7	316	7	4	4	338	0.33%	0	0	0
Valid votes		21,128	41,793	9,583	20,158	10,586	103,248	100.00%	6	1	7
Rejected votes		69	113	27	71	29	309	0.30%			
Total polled		21,197	41,906	9,610	20,229	10,615	103,557	91.95%			
Registered electors		23,297	45,504	10,366	21,963	11,492	112,622				
Turnout		90.99%	92.09%	92.71%	92.10%	92.37%	91.95%				

The following candidates were elected: Claes Elmstedt (C); Hans Gustafsson (S); Margot Håkansson (F); Helge Karlsson (S); Ralf Lindström (S); Karl-Anders Petersson (C); and Hans Wachtmeister (M).

===== 1973 =====
Results of the 1973 general election held on 16 September 1973:

Party		Votes per municipality					Total votes	%	Seats		
Party		Karls- hamn	Karls- krona	Olof- ström	Ronne- by	Sölves- borg	Total votes	%	Con.	Lev.	Tot.
Swedish Social Democratic Party	S	10,435	19,207	4,737	9,578	4,821	48,778	49.56%	3	0	3
Centre Party	C	4,403	8,601	2,171	5,124	2,216	22,515	22.88%	2	0	2
Moderate Party	M	2,325	5,068	870	2,056	1,465	11,784	11.97%	1	0	1
People's Party	F	1,433	4,737	703	1,411	980	9,264	9.41%	0	1	1
Left Party – Communists	VPK	1,237	1,317	413	760	355	4,082	4.15%	0	0	0
Christian Democratic Unity	KDS	347	785	268	183	161	1,744	1.77%	0	0	0
Communist Party of Sweden	SKP	56	40	33	30	3	162	0.16%	0	0	0
Communist League Marxist–Leninists (the revolutionaries)	KFML(r)	31	19	14	21	3	88	0.09%	0	0	0
Other parties		3	0	5	0	0	8	0.01%	0	0	0
Valid votes		20,270	39,774	9,214	19,163	10,004	98,425	100.00%	6	1	7
Rejected votes		14	34	12	29	14	103	0.10%			
Total polled		20,284	39,808	9,226	19,192	10,018	98,528	90.84%			
Registered electors		22,455	43,911	10,097	21,055	10,946	108,464				
Turnout		90.33%	90.66%	91.37%	91.15%	91.52%	90.84%				

The following candidates were elected: Valdo Carlström (F); Claes Elmstedt (C); Helge Karlsson (S); Ralf Lindström (S); Mats Olsson (S); Karl-Anders Petersson (C); and Hans Wachtmeister (M).

===== 1970 =====
Results of the 1970 general election held on 20 September 1970:

Party		Votes per municipality											Total votes	%	Seats		
Party		Fridlev- stad	Hasslö	Jämjö	Karls- hamn	Karls- krona	Nättra- by	Olof- ström	Röde- by	Ronne- by	Sölves- borg	Postal votes	Total votes	%	Con.	Lev.	Tot.
Swedish Social Democratic Party	S	1,171	550	2,550	9,528	9,981	979	4,270	1,094	8,711	4,303	4,884	48,021	50.24%	4	0	4
Centre Party	C	1,109	118	1,546	3,087	2,223	362	1,548	625	3,960	1,527	1,803	17,908	18.74%	1	0	1
People's Party	F	213	48	684	1,898	3,915	280	897	336	1,809	1,215	3,255	14,550	15.22%	1	0	1
Moderate Party	M	308	9	601	1,427	1,571	165	628	202	1,259	1,056	2,232	9,458	9.90%	0	0	0
Left Party – Communists	VPK	72	80	67	1,075	772	76	440	35	650	297	399	3,963	4.15%	0	0	0
Christian Democratic Unity	KDS	58	56	106	238	287	9	211	43	122	149	266	1,545	1.62%	0	0	0
Communist League Marxists-Leninists	KFML	0	0	3	57	16	0	2	0	9	5	28	120	0.13%	0	0	0
Other parties		0	0	0	1	0	0	2	0	0	0	8	11	0.01%	0	0	0
Valid votes		2,931	861	5,557	17,311	18,765	1,871	7,998	2,335	16,520	8,552	12,875	95,576	100.00%	6	0	6
Rejected votes		0	0	2	7	15	2	3	2	13	4	55	103	0.11%			
Total polled exc. postal votes		2,931	861	5,559	17,318	18,780	1,873	8,001	2,337	16,533	8,556	12,930	95,679				
Postal votes		257	40	548	2,419	5,047	258	929	230	2,145	999	-12,930	-58				
Total polled inc. postal votes		3,188	901	6,107	19,737	23,827	2,131	8,930	2,567	18,678	9,555	0	95,621	88.39%			
Registered electors		3,672	1,037	6,796	22,458	27,384	2,324	10,030	2,829	20,939	10,706		108,175				
Turnout		86.82%	86.89%	89.86%	87.88%	87.01%	91.70%	89.03%	90.74%	89.20%	89.25%		88.39%				

The following candidates were elected: Valdo Carlström (F); Claes Elmstedt (C); Nils Fridolfsson (S); Helge Karlsson (S); Mats Olsson (S); and Göte Peterson (S).

Permanent substitutions:

- Göte Peterson (S) died in May 1971 and was replaced by Ralf Lindström (S).
