= 1967 in Sweden =

- Decades: 1940s; 1950s; 1960s; 1970s; 1980s
- See also: Other events of 1967; Timeline of Swedish history

Events from the year 1967 in Sweden

== Incumbents ==
- Monarch – Gustaf VI Adolf
- Prime Minister – Tage Erlander

== Events ==
- 3 September – Sweden switches from driving on the left-hand side to the right-hand side of the road. The day is known as Dagen H.

== Births ==
- 4 March – Jonas Edman, rifle shooter.
- 17 March – Johan Hammarström, footballer.
- 18 March – Stefan Lindqvist, footballer (died 2020).
- 20 March – Jonas Thern, footballer.
- 21 March – Jonas Berggren, Musical artist
- 17 April – Roger Johansson, ice hockey player.
- 18 April – Eva Zeikfalvy, footballer.
- 16 June – Mikael Nilsson, footballer.
- 11 July – Ola Svensson, footballer.
- 13 July – Roger Hansson, ice hockey player.
- 17 July – Regina Lund, actress and singer
- 25 July – Magdalena Forsberg, cross-country skier.
- 25 July – Günther, singer
- 29 July – Magnus Andersson, footballer.
- 16 August – Ulrika Jonsson, television presenter.
- 24 August – Jan Eriksson, footballer.
- 6 October – Kennet Andersson, footballer.
- 26 October – Elisabeth Svantesson, politician
- 9 November – Patric Karlsson, footballer.
- 30 November – Patrik Andersson, footballer.
- 27 December – Per Fahlström, footballer.
- Unknown date – Magnus Johansson, politician

== Deaths ==
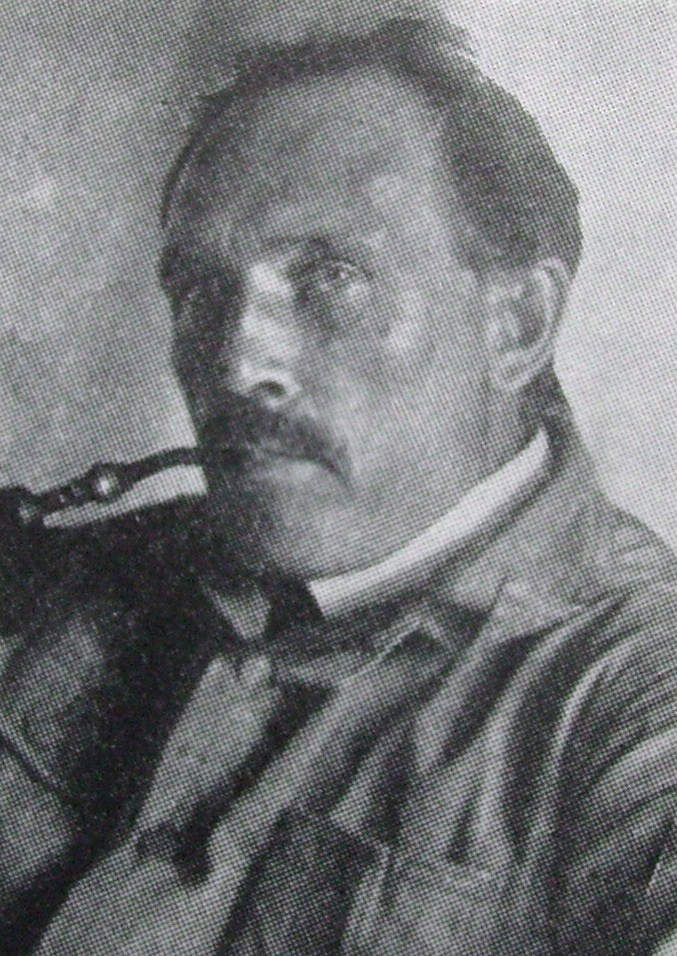
Gustav Hedenvind-Eriksson.

- 21 January - Nils Löfgren, chemist (born 1913)
- 10 February – Anders Hylander, gymnast (born 1883).
- 13 March – Ragnar Gunnarsson, footballer (born 1891).
- 17 April – Gustav Hedenvind-Eriksson, writer (born 1880).
- 14 May – Fausto Acke, gymnast (born 1897).

=== Exact date unknown ===
- – Ellen Hagen
