= Dalmo =

Dalmo or DALMO may refer to:

- Dalmo (footballer, born 1932), Brazilian football left-back Dalmo Gaspar (1932–2015)
- Dalmo (footballer, born 1984), Brazilian football striker Dalmo Inácio da Silva
- David Dalmo (born 1972), Swedish dancer
- Daru-Al-Moameneen (DALMO), an Islamic organization for South West England
