= 1972 in Sweden =

- Decades: 1950s; 1960s; 1970s; 1980s; 1990s
- See also: Other events of 1972; Timeline of Swedish history

Events from the year 1972 in Sweden

== Incumbents ==
- Monarch – Gustaf VI Adolf
- Prime Minister – Olof Palme

== Events ==
- 30 September – The Öland Bridge between mainland Sweden and Swedish Baltic Sea island of Öland is inaugurated.
- On 28 November, Princess Sibylla, Duchess of Vasterbotten dies at age 64. She was the widow of Prince Gustaf Adolf, Duke of Vasterbotten (1906–1947), and mother of Crown Prince Carl Gustaf (future King of Sweden).
- June - The first global conference on the environment was held in Stockholm.

== Births ==
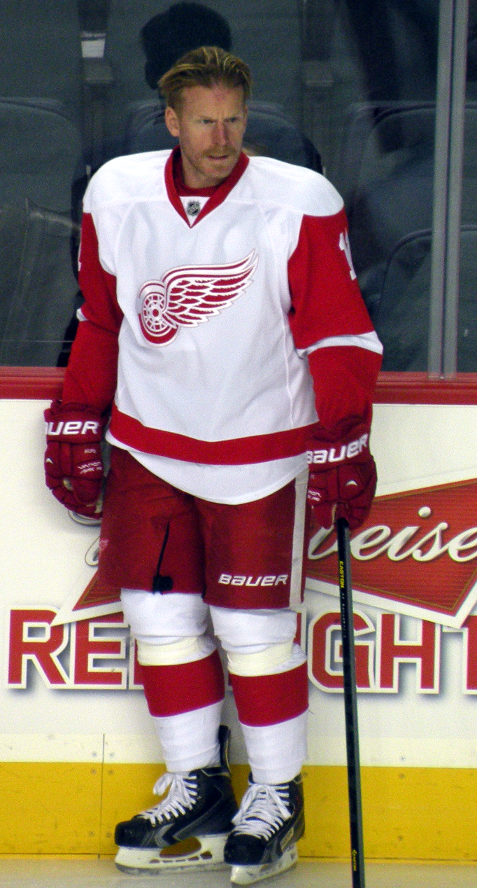
Daniel Alfredsson.

- 20 January – Oscar Dronjak, guitarist
- 17 February – Lars-Göran Petrov, singer and drummer (Entombed and Morbid)
- 23 March – Jonas Björkman, tennis player and coach
- 25 April – Malin Östh, politician
- 29 April – Fredrik Kempe, songwriter and opera and pop singer
- 19 May – Jenny Berggren, rock singer
- 20 May – Andreas Lundstedt, singer and actor (Alcazar)
- 3 July – Henrik Fritzon, politician
- 18 July – Fredrik Åkesson, guitarist
- 3 August – Patrik Isaksson, singer and songwriter
- 5 September – David Dalmo, Swedish dancer
- 29 September – Jörgen Jönsson, ice hockey player.
- 6 October – Anders Iwers, musician
- 28 November – Jesper Strömblad, musician
- 11 December – Daniel Alfredsson, ice hockey player.
- 29 December – Andreas Dackell, ice hockey player.
- Unknown date – Robert Andersson Hammarstrand, politician

== Deaths ==
- 14 February – Andreas Cervin, gymnast (born 1888).
- Aurora Nilsson (born 1894)
- 28 November – Sibylla, princess of Sweden (born 1908).
