= 1968 in Sweden =

- Decades: 1940s; 1950s; 1960s; 1970s; 1980s
- See also: Other events of 1968; Timeline of Swedish history

Events in the year 1968 in Sweden.

== Incumbents ==
- Monarch – Gustaf VI Adolf
- Prime Minister – Tage Erlander

== Events ==
- 15 September – The 1968 Swedish general election is held.
- 28–29 September – The 1968 World Orienteering Championships are held in Linköping.

== Births ==
- January 12 - Anders Bagge.
- May 3 - Anders Sandberg.
- May 8 - Annika Andersson.
- October 18 - Anders Kraft.
- November 25 - Mikael Martinsson.

== Deaths ==
- March 31 - Eivar Widlund.
- November 16 - Carl Bertilsson.

== Other ==
- Socialist Solidarity Committee for Czechoslovakia formed in response to the Prague Spring.
