= 1973 in Sweden =

- Decades: 1950s; 1960s; 1970s; 1980s; 1990s
- See also: Other events of 1973; Timeline of Swedish history

Events from the year 1973 in Sweden

== Incumbents ==
- Monarch – Gustaf VI Adolf (died 15 September), then Carl XVI Gustaf
- Prime Minister – Olof Palme

== Events ==
- 20 January – A 34-year-old academic lecturer, Alf Svensson, becomes party leader of the Swedish political party Kristen Demokratisk Samling (KDS), a position he would hold for 31 years.
- 16 March – Residents of the municipality of Dorothea go on hunger strike in protest of the Swedish government's plans to merge with the municipalities of Åsele and Frederika, giving up after a week.
- 11 May – The Data Act (Sw. Datalagen) − the world's first national data protection law − is enacted in Sweden.
- 23–28 August – Norrmalmstorg robbery – a bank robbery and hostage crisis best known as the origin of the term Stockholm syndrome.
- 15 September – King Gustaf VI Adolf dies in his 91st year at 8:35 pm. He's succeeded by his 27-year-old grandson, Carl XVI Gustaf.
- 16 September – 1973 Swedish general election.

== Births ==
- 23 January – Tomas Holmström, ice hockey player.
- 23 February – Linda Ulvaeus, actress and singer
- 19 March – Magnus Hedman, footballer
- 22 March – Martina Fortkord, alpine skier.
- 25 March – Anders Fridén, singer
- 1 April – Anna Carin Zidek, biathlete
- 3 April – Andreas Carlsson, music producer and songwriter
- 15 April – Teddy Lučić, footballer and manager
- 27 April – Sharlee D'Angelo, musical artist
- 5 May – Johan Hedberg, ice hockey player
- 24 May – Jill Johnson, Musical artist
- 5 July – Marcus Allbäck, footballer and coach
- 20 July – Peter Forsberg, ice hockey player.
- 24 July – Marléne Lund Kopparklint, politician
- 30 July – Markus Näslund, ice hockey player
- 6 August – Tina Nordström, chef
- 7 August – Armand Krajnc, professional boxer
- 9 August – Katarina Wennstam, journalist
- 15 September – Prince Daniel, Duke of Västergötland, Duke of Västergötland
- 26 September – Maria Bonnevie, Swedish-Norwegian actress
- 3 October – Ljubomir Vranjes, handball player
- 16 October – Eva Röse, actress
- 12 October – Martin Österdahl, author and television producer
- Unknown date – Agnes Hultén, politician

== Deaths ==
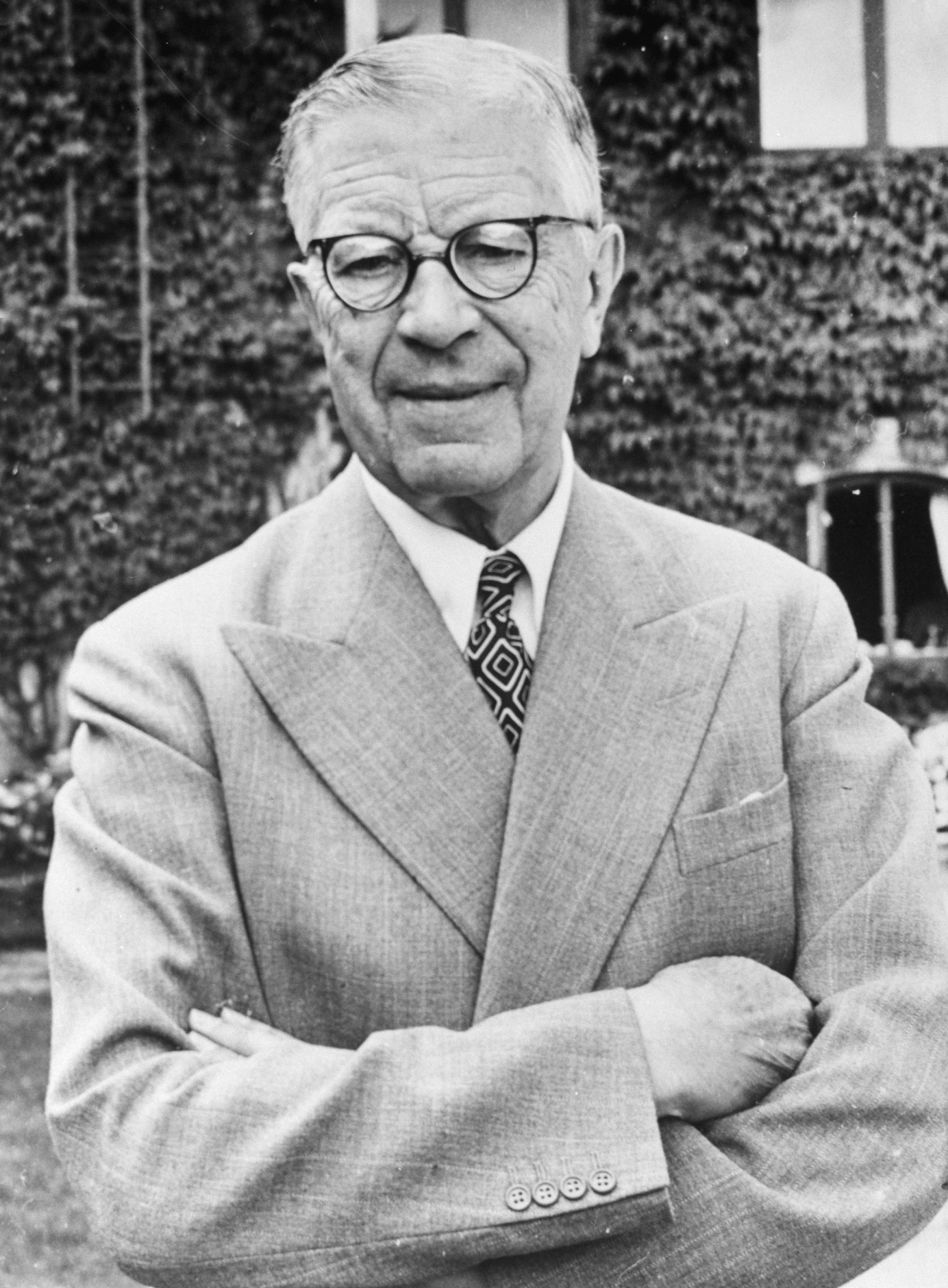
Gustaf VI Adolf was king of Sweden from 1950 until his death.

- 4 August – Gustav Freij, wrestler, Olympic champion in 1948 (born 1922).
- 7 September – Ernst Casparsson, horse rider (born 1886).
- 15 September – Gustaf VI Adolf, king (born 1882).
