= Brunnberg =

Brunnberg is a Swedish surname. Notable people with the surname include:

- Mike Brunnberg (born 1958), Swedish-born American tennis player
- Ulf Brunnberg (born 1947), Swedish actor

== See also ==
- Brunsberg
