= Annette Rydell =

Swedish politician (born 1965)

Member of the Riksdag
- In office 5 October 2022 – 31 July 2023
- Succeeded by: Magnus Manhammar
- Constituency: Blekinge County

Personal details
- Born: 8 August 1965 (age 60)
- Party: Social Democratic

Pia Marie Annette Rydell (born 8 August 1965) is a Swedish politician from the Swedish Social Democratic Party. She was a member of the parliament from 2022 to 2023.

== See also ==
- List of members of the Riksdag, 2022–2026
