= Gylling =

Gylling may refer to:

- Gylling (Odder Municipality), a village in Jutland, Denmark
- a Danish- and Swedish-language surname. Notable people with the surname include
  - Edvard Gylling, Finnish (later Soviet) politician
  - Jane Gylling, Swedish swimmer
  - Johnny Gylling, Swedish politician
