= Magnus Andersson =

Magnus Andersson may refer to:

- Magnus Andersson (footballer, born 1958), former Swedish footballer
- Magnus Andersson (footballer, born 1967), former Swedish footballer
- Magnus Andersson (footballer, born 1981), Swedish football midfielder
- Magnus Andersson (guitarist) (born 1956), Swedish classical guitarist
- Magnus Andersson (handballer) (born 1966), Swedish handball player
- Magnus Andersson (Centre Party Youth politician) (born 1981), Swedish politician
- Magnus Andersson (Pirate politician) (born 1974), leader of the Pirate Party of Sweden

== See also ==
- Magnus Andersen (disambiguation)
