= Widerberg =

Widerberg is a surname. Notable people with the surname include:

- Bo Widerberg (1930–1997), Swedish film director, writer, and actor
- Frans Widerberg (1934–2017), Norwegian painter and graphic artist
- Henriette Widerberg (1796–1872), Swedish opera singer
- Johan Widerberg (born 1974), Swedish actor
- Karolina Widerberg (born 1984), Swedish politician
- Siv Widerberg (1931–2020), Swedish writer and journalist
