= Magnus Johansson =

Magnus Johansson may refer to:

- Magnus Johansson (footballer, born 1964), football player for SK Brann, later coach
- Magnus Johansson (footballer, born 1971), football player for Ölme, IFK Göteborg and FC Groningen
- Magnus Johansson (handball coach) (born 1969), handball coach
- Magnus Johansson (ice hockey) (born 1973), professional ice hockey player who currently plays with SEL team Linköpings HC
- Magnus Johansson (politician) (born 1967), politician

== See also ==
- Magnus Johansen (1886–1970), Norwegian politician
