= Brunsberg =

Brunsberg may refer to:

== People ==
- Arlo Brunsberg (born 1940), American professional baseball player
- Camilla Brunsberg (born 1972), Swedish politician

== Places ==
- Brunsberg (Harburg), a high hill in northern Germany
