= 1969 in Sweden =

- Decades: 1940s; 1950s; 1960s; 1970s; 1980s
- See also: Other events of 1969; Timeline of Swedish history

Events from the year 1969 in Sweden

== Incumbents ==
=== National level ===
- Monarch – Gustaf VI Adolf
- Prime Minister – Tage Erlander until 14 October, then Olof Palme.

== Events ==
=== October ===
- October 1
  - In Sweden, Olof Palme is elected Leader of the Social Democratic Worker`s Party, replacing Tage Erlander as Prime Minister on October 14.
- 5 December – Swedish public television broadcaster Sveriges Radio-TV launches its second channel, TV2.

== Births ==
- 16 January - Per "Dead" Ohlin, vocalist and lyricist (died 1991).
- 3 February - Paolo Roberto, boxer and actor.
- 5 February - Joakim Andersson, ice hockey player.
- 12 February - Anna Pernilla Torndahl, composer, artist and singer better known by her stage name Meja.
- 23 March - Fredrik Nyberg, alpine skier.
- 5 April - Pontus Kåmark, footballer.
- 20 May - Camilla Rinaldo Miller, politician.
- 19 July - Anders Lindström, musician
- 25 July - Mats Söderlund, singer better known by his stage name Günther.
- 6 October - Mattias Eklundh, musician.
- Unknown date - Michael Melby, politician.

== Deaths ==
- 1 January — Bruno Söderström, pole vaulter and javelin thrower (born 1881)
- 28 March — Kurt Petter, German physician, youth leader and educational administrator (born 1909).
- 7 June — Olivia Nordgren, politician (born 1880)
- 23 June - Albert Viksten, writer (born 1898).
- 31 July - Harry Ahlin, film actor (born 1900).
- 15 September - Åke Grönberg, film actor (born 1914).
- 1 October - Gunnar Andersson, footballer (born 1928).
- 16 November - Marcel Riesz, Hungarian mathematician (born 1886).
