= Heléne Björklund =

Swedish politician (born 1972)

Heléne Björklund S
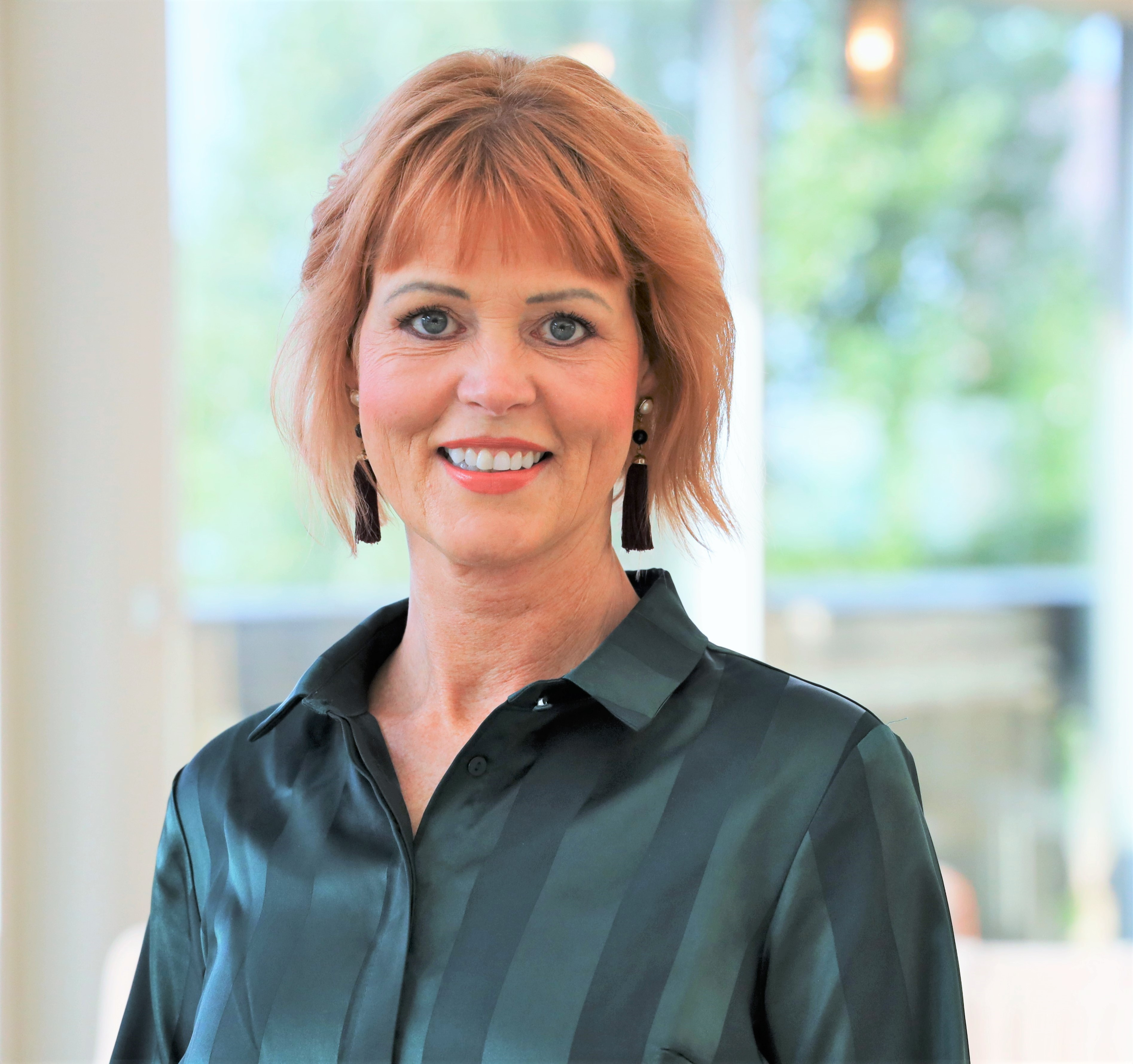
- Björklund in 2020

Member of the Riksdag
- Incumbent
- Assumed office 24 September 2018
- Constituency: Blekinge County

President of the Nordic Council
- Incumbent
- Assumed office 1 January 2025
- Preceded by: Bryndís Haraldsdóttir

Personal details
- Born: Eva Heléne Persson; 29 September 1972 (age 53) Sölvesborg, Sweden
- Party: Social Democratic
- Spouse: Markus Alexandersson
- Profession: Politician, teacher

Eva Heléne Björklund (née Persson; born 29 September 1972) is a Swedish Social Democratic politician who has been a member of the Riksdag since the 2018 general election. She holds seat number 184 for the Blekinge County's constituency but originally was seated on seat number 93. She is currently a member of the Committee on Defence.

== Biography ==
Björklund was born and raised in Sölvesborg Municipality. She is the daughter of Gunnar Persson (born 1947) and Monica Gadd (born 1953). She currently lives in Sölvesborg with her husband Markus Alexandersson and her four children. She is a teacher by profession.

== Career ==
Björklund started off as a municipal politician for municipal council of Sölvesborg Municipality. From the years 2006 until 2018 she was the municipal board chairperson when her successor Louise Erixon was elected in 2018. She is the president of the Swedish Social Democratic Party in Blekinge County where she is also a board member.

She took over as the chairperson for Sölvesborg Municipality in 2006 from Jens Åberg who had been serving as the chairperson since 1988. She became the first woman to serve as chairperson for Sölvesborg Municipality.

On 2 June 2021 she became a godparent of Sofia Sapega, a Russian-Belarusian political prisoner.
