= Suzanne Svensson =

Swedish politician (born 1958)

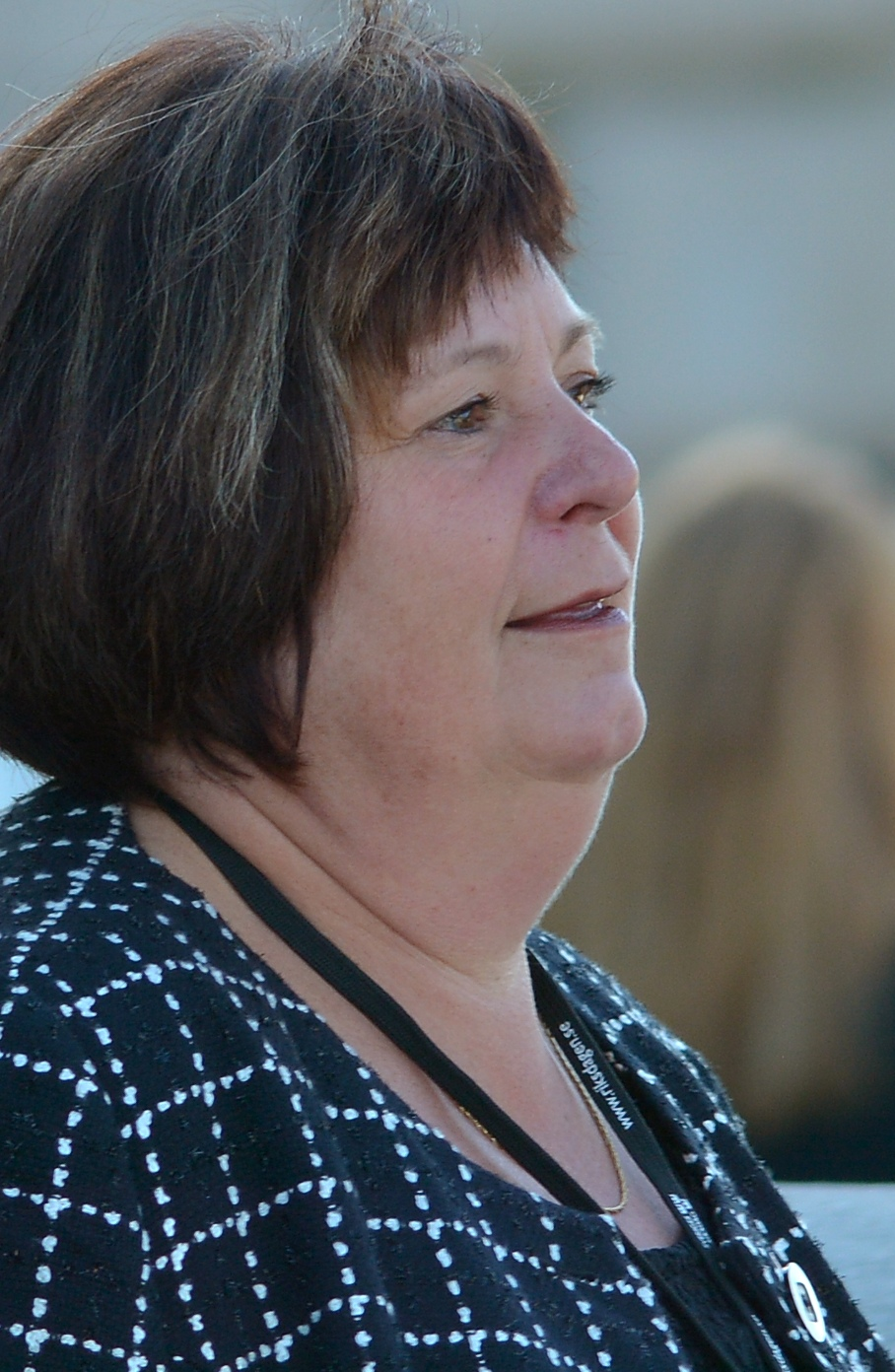

Member of the Riksdag
- In office 4 October 2010 – 24 September 2018
- Constituency: Blekinge County

Personal details
- Born: 1958 (age 67–68)
- Party: Social Democrats

Suzanne Svensson (born 1958) is a Swedish politician. She served as member of the Riksdag from 4 October 2010 to 24 September 2018, representing the constituency of Blekinge County.
