= 1971 in Sweden =

- Decades: 1950s; 1960s; 1970s; 1980s; 1990s
- See also: Other events of 1971; Timeline of Swedish history

Events from the year 1971 in Sweden

== Incumbents ==
- Monarch – Gustaf VI Adolf
- Prime Minister – Olof Palme

== Events ==
- 11–12 May – The Elm Conflict in Stockholm.

== Births ==
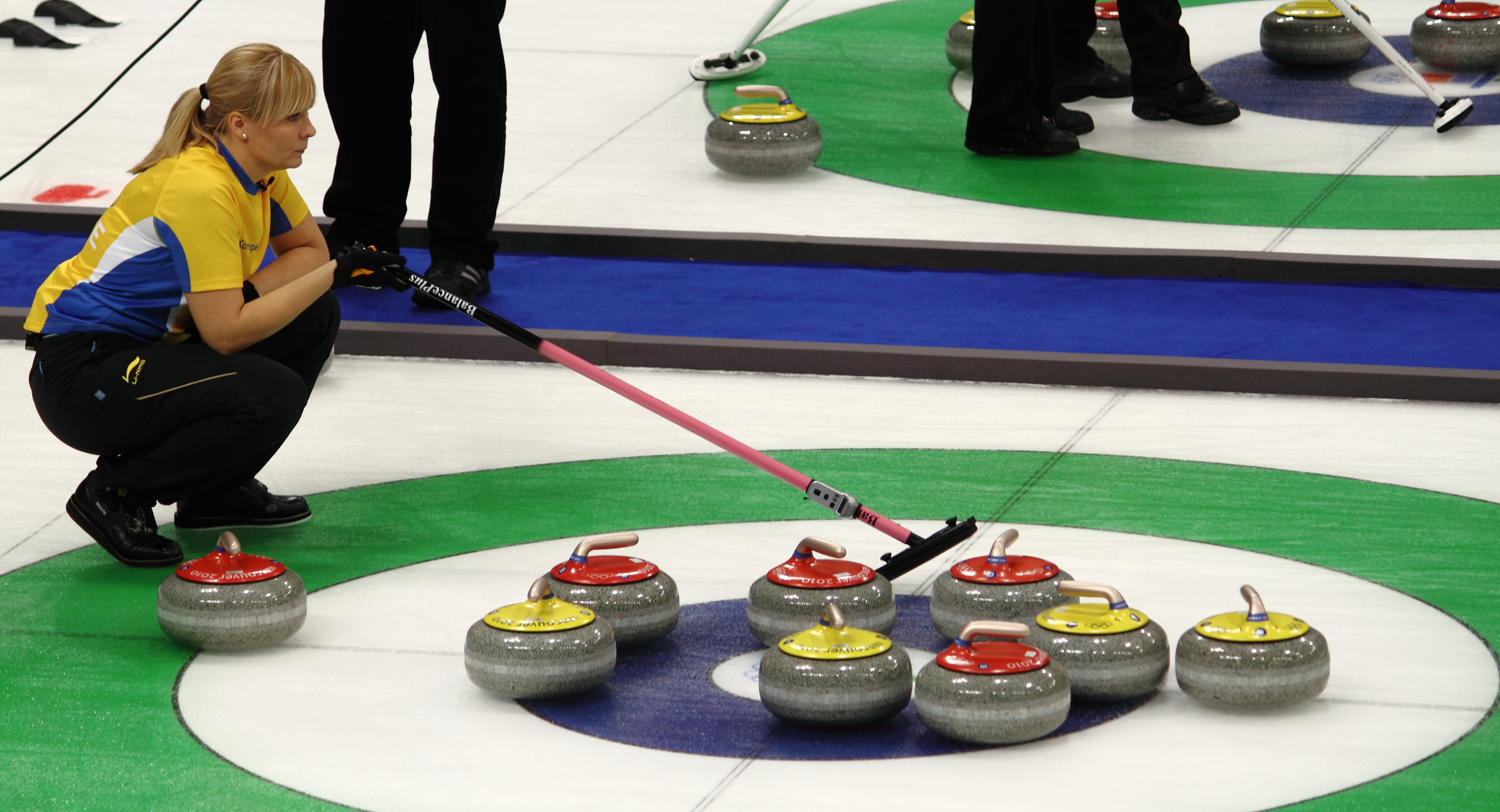
Eva Lund.

- 8 January – Jesper Jansson, footballer
- 1 May – Eva Lund, curler, Olympic champion in 2006 and 2010.
- 19 May – Peter Boström, music producer and songwriter, co-writer of Euphoria
- 22 July – Fredrik Florén, diplomat.
- 5 October – Ivan Mathias Petersson, actor.
- 5 November – Mårten Olander, golfer.
- 7 November – Martin Björk, television presenter.
- 9 November – Melinda Kinnaman, actress.
- 25 November – Magnus Arvedson, hockey player
- 26 November – Åsa Kullgren, politician
- Unknown date – Åsa Andersson, politician

== Deaths ==
- 2 November – Hjalmar Andersson, athlete (born 1889).
