= Christer Skoog =

Swedish politician (born 1945)

Member of the Riksdag
- In office 3 October 1988 – 2 October 2006
- Constituency: Blekinge County

Personal details
- Born: 1945 (age 80–81)
- Party: Social Democratic Party

Christer Skoog (born 1945) is a Swedish politician and former member of the Riksdag, the national legislature. A member of the Social Democratic Party, he represented Blekinge County between October 1988 and October 2006.
