= Magnus Johansson (politician) =

Swedish politician (born 1967)

- Johansson in August 2020

Member of the Riksdag
- Incumbent
- Assumed office 28 September 2026
- Constituency: Blekinge County
- In office 17 September 1996 – 5 October 1998
- Preceded by: Yvonne Sandberg-Fries
- Constituency: Blekinge County

Personal details
- Born: 1967 (age 58–59) Karlskrona, Sweden
- Party: Social Democratic Party

Jan Magnus Johansson (born 1967) is a Swedish politician and Member of the Riksdag. A member of the Social Democratic Party, he has represented Blekinge County since September 2026. He was previously a member from September 1996 to October 1998.

Johansson was born in 1967 in Karlskrona. He was a painter and an official for the Swedish Painters' Union (Målarna). He later worked as a party official for the Social Democratic Party branches in Karlskrona Municipality and Blekinge County. He was a member of the Swedish Commercial Employees' Union (Handels).

Johansson was a member of the Swedish Social Democratic Youth League (SSU) in Rödeby. He was a member of the municipal council in Karlskrona and was municipal commissioner (kommunalråd). He was also member of Region Blekinge, the regional council (regionfullmäktige) in Blekinge. He was a substitute member of the Riksdag for Yvonne Sandberg-Fries between January 1995 and October 1995. He was appointed to the Riksdag in September 1996 following the resignation of Sandberg-Fries. He was elected to the Riksdag at the 2026 general election.
