= Magnus Manhammar =

Swedish politician (born 1980)

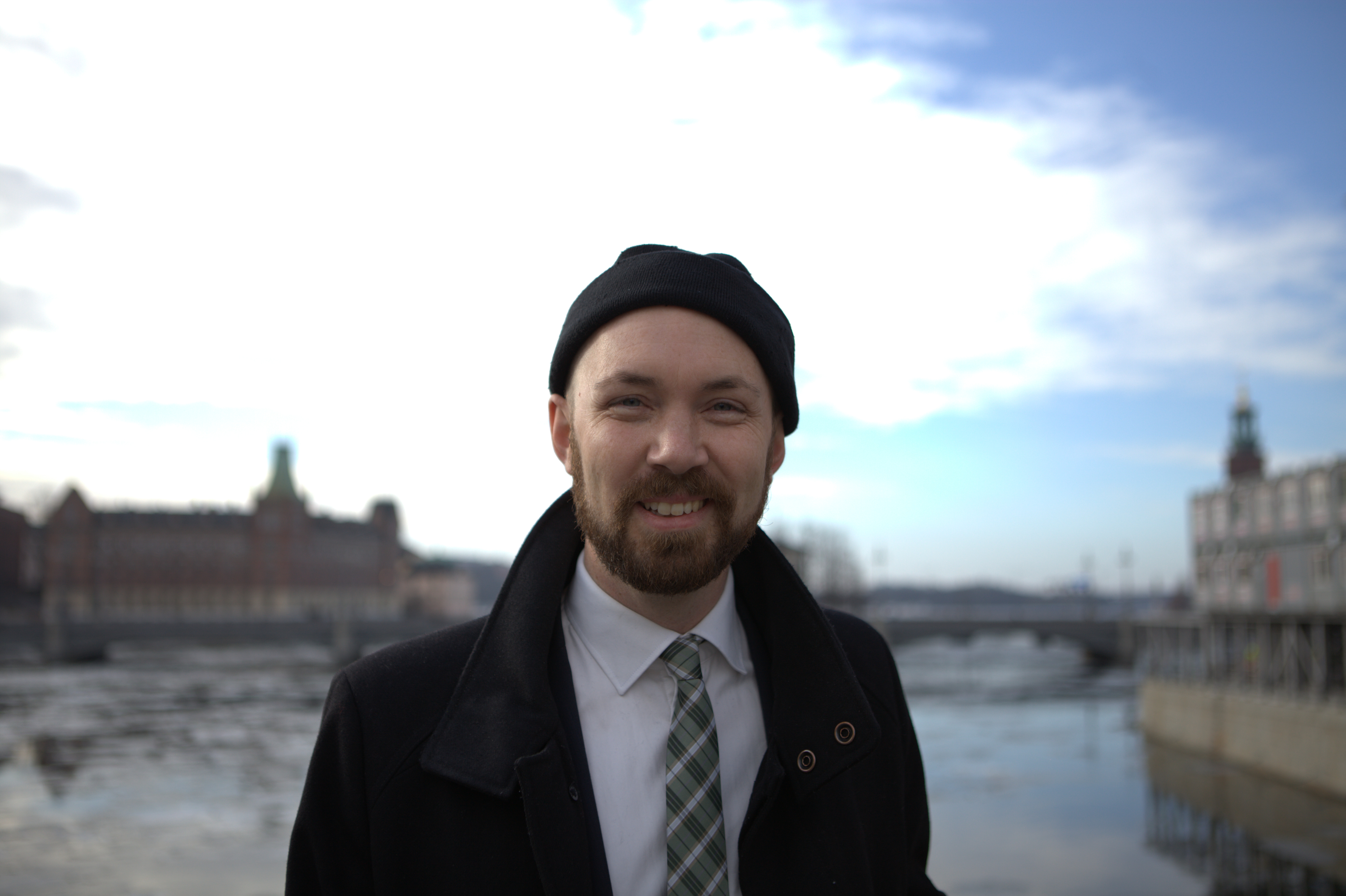
- Magnus Manhammar's official portrait Picture: Sveriges riksdag

Member of the Riksdag
- In office 29 September 2014 – 26 September 2022
- Succeeded by: Annette Rydell
- Constituency: Blekinge County

Personal details
- Born: 1980 (age 44–45)
- Political party: Social Democrats

Magnus Manhammar (born 1980) is a Swedish politician. From September 2014 to September 2022, he served as Member of the Riksdag representing the constituency of Blekinge County.
