= 1974 in Swedish television =

This is a list of Swedish television related events from 1974.

== Events ==
- 6 April - Sweden wins the 19th Eurovision Song Contest in Brighton, United Kingdom. The winning song is "Waterloo", performed by ABBA. The year marks the first time the contest was won by a group.

== Television shows ==
- 1–24 December - Rulle på Rullseröd

=== 1960s ===
- Hylands hörna (1962-1983)

=== 1970s ===
- Hem till byn (1971-2006)

== Births ==
- 24 February - David Hellenius, comedian & TV host
- 9 December - Peter Magnusson, comedian & actor

== See also ==
- 1974 in Sweden
