= Jan Björkman =

Swedish politician

Member of the Riksdag
- Incumbent
- Assumed office 1988
- Constituency: Blekinge County

Personal details
- Party: Social Democratic

Jan Björkman, is a Swedish Social Democratic politician, member of the Riksdag from 1988 to 2010. From 2006 to 2010, he was First Vice Speaker of the Riksdag.
