= 1970 in Sweden =

- Decades: 1950s; 1960s; 1970s; 1980s; 1990s
- See also: Other events of 1970; Timeline of Swedish history

Events from the year 1970 in Sweden

== Incumbents ==
- Monarch – Gustaf VI Adolf
- Prime Minister – Olof Palme

== Events ==
- 20 September – The 1970 Swedish general election is held.

== Births ==
- 26 February – Cathrine Lindahl, curler, Olympic champion in 2006 and 2010.
- 4 March – Mats Berglund, politician
- 24 April – Patrik Juhlin, ice hockey player.
- 13 June – Mikael Ljungberg, wrestler, Olympic champion in 2000 (died 2004).

== Deaths ==
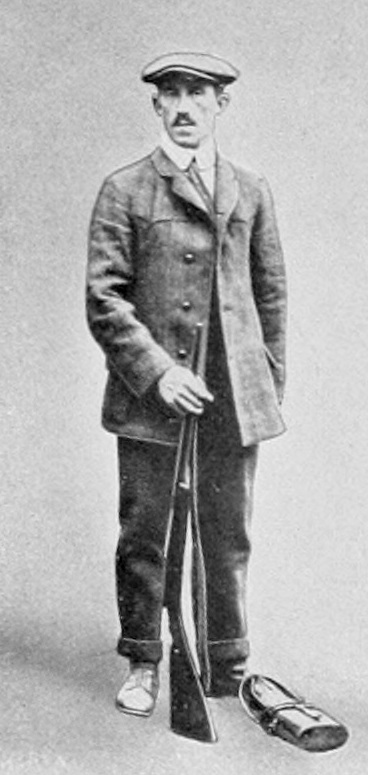
Vilhelm Carlberg in 1912, when he won three Olympic gold medals in shooting.

- 12 May — Nelly Sachs, German-Swedish poet and playwright (born 1891).
- 1 October – Vilhelm Carlberg, sport shooter (born 1880).
