= 1974 in Sweden =

- Decades: 1950s; 1960s; 1970s; 1980s; 1990s
- See also: Other events of 1974; Timeline of Swedish history

Events from the year 1974 in Sweden

== Incumbents ==
- Monarch – Carl XVI Gustaf
- Prime Minister – Olof Palme

== Events ==
- 2 January – Electricity rationing is introduced in Sweden due to the oil crisis
- 29 January – The Swedish petrol rationing ends after three weeks
- 7 March – Electricity rationing in Sweden ends, among other things, the street lights turn on fully again
- 6 April – Sweden wins the 19th Eurovision Song Contest in Brighton, United Kingdom. The winning song is "Waterloo", performed by ABBA. The year marks the first time the contest was won by a group.
- 26 April – Sweden's first videographer is inaugurated.
- 18 September – Swedish spy Stig Wennerström, sentenced in 1964 to life imprisonment, is released by decision of the Swedish government

== Popular culture ==
=== Literature ===
- Eyvind Johnson and Harry Martinson are awarded the Nobel Prize in Literature. The two laureates were members of the Swedish Academy at the time; the decision was criticized by the media, and Martinson committed suicide in 1978.

== Births ==
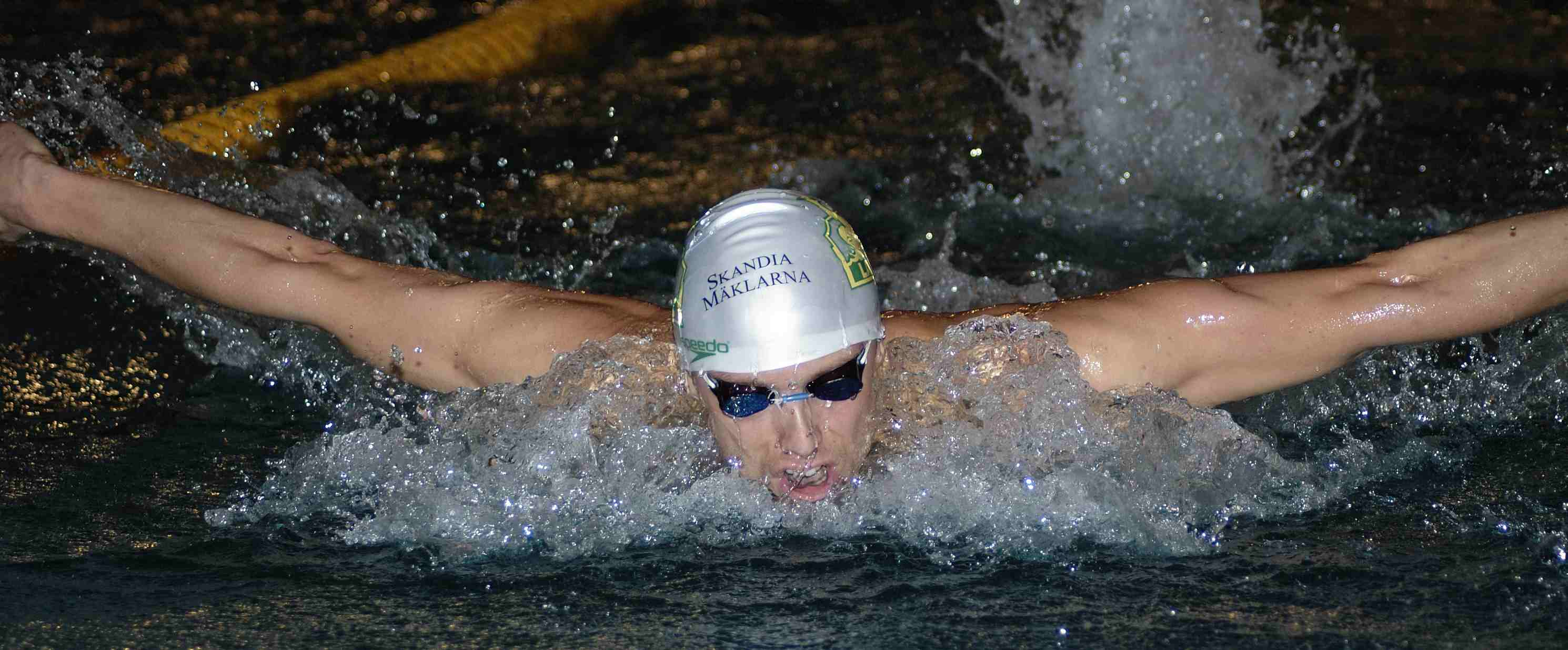
Lars Frölander.

- 16 January – Mattias Jonson, footballer
- 13 March – Thomas Enqvist, former professional tennis player
- 20 March – Mattias Asper, footballer
- 31 March – Stefan Olsdal, Musical artist
- 2 April – Håkan Hellström, singer-songwriter
- 16 April – Mattias Timander, former ice hockey player
- 17 April – Mikael Åkerfeldt, musician
- 26 May – Lars Frölander, swimmer.
- 24 June – Magnus Carlsson, Musical artist
- 25 June – Fredrik Bild, footballer
- 9 July – Nikola Šarčević, musician of Serbian origin
- 30 July – Josefin Åsberg, film art director.
- 30 August – Camilla Läckberg, crime writer
- 6 September – Nina Persson, singer
- 7 October – Charlotte Perrelli, Musical artist
- 8 October – Fredrik Modin, ice hockey player
- 24 October – Joakim Nätterqvist, actor
- 19 December – Minna Telde, horse rider.
- 20 December – Angelica Ljungquist, beach volleyball player
- 24 December – Thure Lindhardt, actor
- 30 December – Johanna Sällström, actress

== Deaths ==
- 7 May – Gustaf Dyrsch, horse rider (born 1890).
- 11 July – Pär Lagerkvist, writer (born 1891)
- 29 October – Axel Cadier, wrestler, Olympic champion in 1936 (born 1906).

== See also ==
- 1974 in Swedish television
