= Magnus Andersen =

Magnus Andersen may refer to:

- Magnus Andersen (politician) (1916–1994), Norwegian politician
- Magnus Andersen (footballer, born 1986), Norwegian footballer
- Magnus Andersen (footballer, born 2006), Danish footballer
- Magnus Kofod Andersen (born 1999), Danish footballer

== See also ==
- Magnus Andersson (disambiguation)
