= Johan Hammarström =

Swedish footballer and manager

Personal information
- Date of birth: 17 March 1967 (age 59)
- Positions: Midfielder; defender

Senior career*
Years	Team	Apps	(Gls)
- IFK Stockholm
1987–1996	Hammarby		
1997–1998	Kongsvinger	18	(0)

Managerial career
- 1999–2004: NTG/Kongsvinger (youth)
- 2005–2007: Galterud
- 2009–2012: Kongsvinger (women)
- 2014: Kongsvinger (women)
- * Club domestic league appearances and goals

Johan Hammarström (born 17 March 1967) is a Swedish retired footballer. Mainly a central midfielder, he could also play as a central defender. He played in the highest leagues of Sweden and Norway for Hammarby IF and Kongsvinger IL respectively, and also managed the youth and women's teams of the latter club.

== Playing career ==
He was born in Vårberg in Stockholm. He started his career in IFK Stockholm before joining Hammarby IF. After three seasons in Division 1, Hammarby returned to the 1994 Allsvenskan. Hammarström was now the team captain. He played 48 of the 52 Allsvenskan games in 1994 and 1995, scoring thrice. Hammarby became a bottom team in the Allsvenskan, however, surviving the 1994 Allsvenskan playout, being relegated from the 1995 Allsvenskan and failing to win repromotion in the 1996 Allsvenskan playoff.

After the latter competition, Hammarström decided to finally leave the club after 181 matches. He notably had offers from Norway. In December 1996, he met with both Lyn and Kongsvinger representatives. The transfer was described as a "tug-of-war" between Kongsvinger and Lyn, where Hammarström chose to sign for Kongsvinger. He later revealed his first impression of Kongsvinger as being "a place that God forgot". He came together with countryfellow Ludwig Ernstsson. Hammarström was mainly considered as a "number 6", a deep-lying midfielder.

In the early stages of the 1997 Eliteserien, he succeeded in his role as distributor of the ball. Norwegian football used less time to build up play, however, and Hammarström was more often asked to start counter-attacks. He was also an alternative at centre-back position. Hammarström stated that Kongsvinger trained more often than Swedish clubs, and suffered from minor injuries during his first months in Kongsvinger. In mid-June 1997, just as he had finished settling into the team, he broke his leg.

Starting the match against Viking in July 1998, it was Hammarström's first Eliteserien match in thirteen months. He strained a thigh muscle in September and was sidelined again. In the end, he played eighteen Eliteserien games in 1997 and 1998 and represented Kongsvinger once in Europe, in the 1998 UEFA Intertoto Cup against FC Twente. Hammarström then retired after the 1998 season. Being declared medically invalid as a sportsman, Hammarström was able to recoup money from insurance.

== Manager career ==
Hammarström started working as a coach at the Norwegian School of Elite Sport when its branch in Kongsvinger opened for the 1999–2000 school year. At that time, Hammarström shared the duties with Arnfinn Engerbakk. He coached the school team and Kongsvinger IL youth teams. Having been considered as a coach in the IK Start system in 2004, he declined to move to Southern Norway. Instead, he became head coach of Third Division side Galterud IF ahead of the 2005 season. He remained for three seasons, resigning after the 2007 season. Ahead of the 2009 season he took over as head coach of Kongsvinger IL's women's team.

During his years as manager of Kongsvinger women from 2009 to 2012, the club won promotion twice. He coached no team in 2013, and was reportedly considered as director of sports in Hammarby. At the end of the year, Hammarström's return to Kongsvinger was announced, effective from the 2014 season. The board cited Hammarström's knowledge of the 4-4-2 formation, which the board wanted to implement in all teams. He resigned as manager after the 2014 season, only to continue as managing director of Kongsvinger IL.

== Personal life ==
Hammarström left KIL in 2018, first on a health absence before resigning. He found a job at a primary school and took up amateur painting, holding local exhibitions.

Johan's father Rolf Hammarström was a member of the rock group The Violents, which eventually included Erik "Jerry Williams" Fernström. Johan Hammarström thus grew up with an interest in music, playing with a friend and mimicking Art Garfunkel's style for a time. By the time he played for Kongsvinger, Hammarström had written "between 300 and 400 melodies" and wanted to join a songwriter collective after retiring. While at home, he saved his ideas on a tape recorder, whereas when he was out, he would call his own answering machine to hum the newly conceived tune.

His brother Peter Hammarström was an elite ice hockey player.
