= Anders Kraft =

Swedish journalist and news anchor (born 1968)

Karl Anders Kraft (born 18 October 1968 in Askim) is a Swedish journalist and news anchor working for TV4.

== See also ==
- Mass media in Sweden
