= Camilla Brunsberg =

Swedish politician (born 1972)

Member of the Riksdag
- Incumbent
- Assumed office 26 September 2022
- Constituency: Blekinge County

Personal details
- Born: Anna Brita Camilla Tillerkvist; 15 April 1972 (age 53)
- Party: Moderate Party

Anna Brita Camilla Brunsberg (née Tillerkvist; born 15 April 1972) is a Swedish politician from the Moderate Party who has been a member of parliament for Blekinge County since the 2022 general election.

== See also ==
- List of members of the Riksdag, 2022–2026
