= Robert Andersson Hammarstrand =

Swedish politician (born 1972)

Member of the Riksdag
- Incumbent
- Assumed office 28 September 2026
- Constituency: Gothenburg Municipality

Personal details
- Born: 1972 (age 53–54) Angered, Sweden
- Party: Social Democratic Party
- Education: University of Gothenburg

Robert Nikola Andersson Hammarstrand (born 1972) is a Swedish politician and Member of the Riksdag. A member of the Social Democratic Party, he has represented Gothenburg Municipality since September 2026.

Andersson Hammarstrand was born in 1972 in Angered. His father is Macedonian and his mother is Swedish. He studied law, English and political science at the University of Gothenburg. He has worked for Volvo and in psychiatric care and elderly care. He is a trade union activist for Unionen.

Andersson Hammarstrand joined the Social Democratic Party in 1991 and served as municipal secretary in Mayor Anneli Hulthén's administration for two years. He was chair of the Centrum District Council (SDN Centrum), a member of the municipal council in Gothenburg and a municipal commissioner (kommunalråd). He was elected to the Riksdag at the 2026 general election.
