= Yvonne Sandberg-Fries =

Swedish politician (1950–2020)

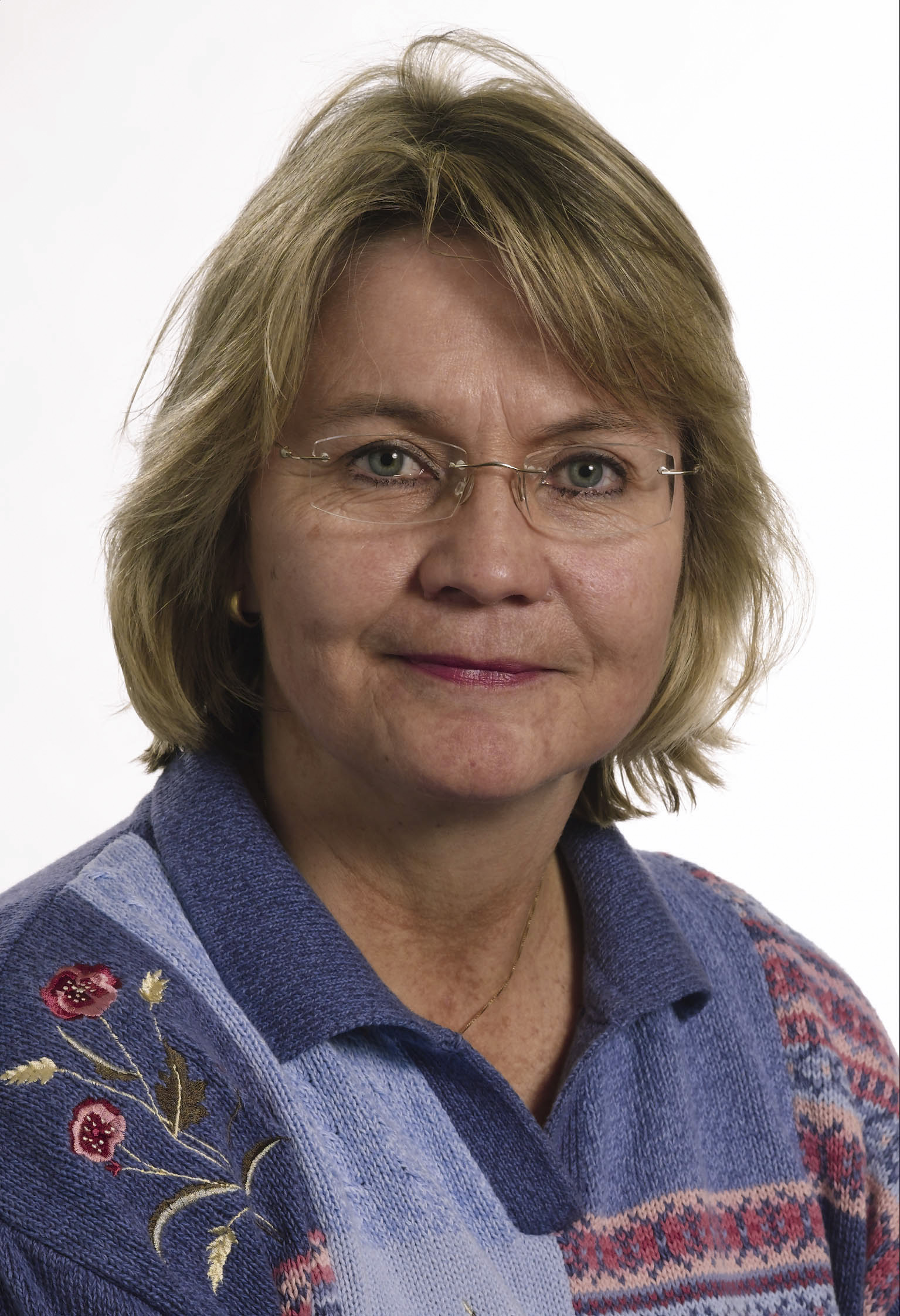

Member of the European Parliament
- In office 1 February 2003 – 19 July 2004

Member of the Riksdag for Blekinge County
- In office 4 October 1982 – 17 September 1996

Personal details
- Born: 14 October 1950 Umeå, Sweden
- Died: 20 December 2020 (aged 70) Blekinge, Sweden
- Party: S/SAP

Yvonne Sandberg-Fries (14 October 1950 – 20 December 2020) was a Swedish politician. She was a member of the Swedish Social Democratic Party until 2014, when she joined the Green Party. She served in the Riksdag from 1982 to 1996 and in the European Parliament from 2003 to 2004.
