= Katarina Wennstam =

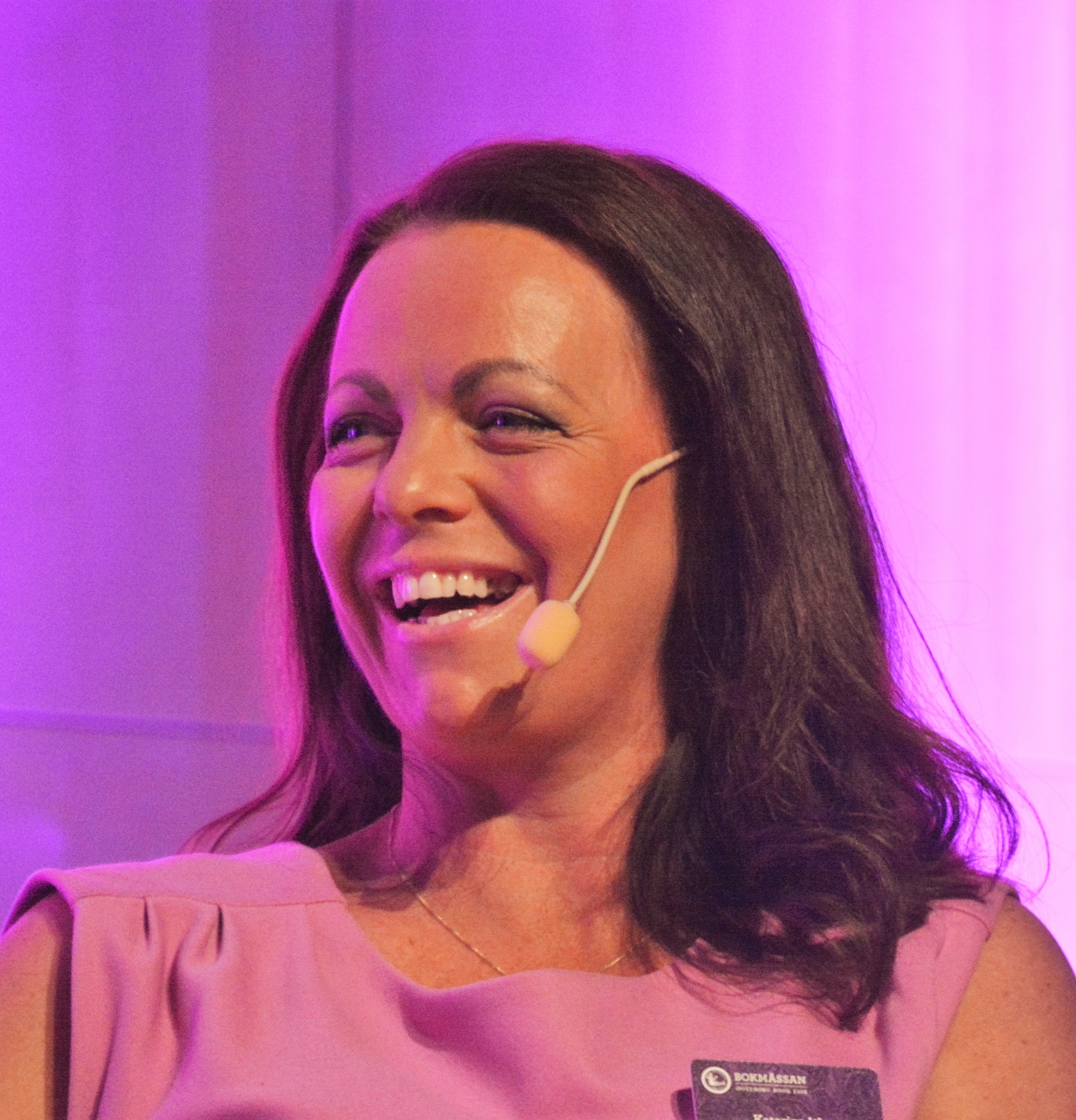
- Katarina Wennstam (2016)
- Born: Anna Katarina Wennstam; 9 August 1973 (age 52); Gothenburg, Sweden
- Occupation: Journalist

Anna Katarina Wennstam (born 9 August 1973) is a Swedish journalist, author, debater, moderator and lecturer. She grew up in Gothenburg but today lives in Nacka. She has previously worked as a crime reporter for SVT, but resigned in 2007 to write and be a lecturer full-time. Wennstam has authored two books with documentary elements about rape and abuse of women. The books have created debate in Sweden about rape, abuse and sexual violence, as well as how female victims are treated in the courts. She also criticizes medias coverage of these kind of crimes in her books.

Her book Flickan och skulden (The girl and the guilt) was nominated for the Swedish August-prize, and she also won Vilhelm Moberg-scholarship and the journalist-prize issued by the Swedish Bar Association.

== Bibliography ==
- 2002 – Flickan och skulden: en bok om samhällets syn på våldtäkt (ISBN 91-0-057840-1)
- 2004 – En riktig våldtäktsman: en bok om samhällets syn på våldtäkt (ISBN 91-0-010113-3)
- 2007 – Smuts (ISBN 978-91-0-010933-2)
- 2008 – Dödergök (ISBN 91-0-011637-8)
- 2010 – Alfahannen (ISBN 978-91-0-012302-4)
- 2012 – Svikaren (ISBN 978-91-0-012549-3)
- 2013 – Stenhjärtat (ISBN 978-91-0-013794-6)
- 2014 – Skuggorna (ISBN 978-91-0-012550-9)
- 2015 – Skymningsflickan (ISBN 978-91-0-014589-7)
