= Ola Svensson (footballer, born 1967) =

Swedish footballer

Personal information
- Full name: Ola Tomas Svensson
- Date of birth: 11 July 1967 (age 59)
- Position: Defender

Senior career*
Years	Team	Apps	(Gls)
1986–1995	Degerfors IF		
1996–1997	Moss FK	25	(2)
1998	Aalesunds FK	10	(0)
1998–2002	Degerfors IF		
- * Club domestic league appearances and goals

Ola Svensson (born 11 July 1967) is a Swedish retired football defender.

He came to Moss FK on a short trial in January 1996. Having spent his senior career hitherto in Degerfors IF, Svensson was now a Bosman player. He was able to play in central midfield, central defense and as left back. He made his debut in a friendly match against Odd, but was injured after an hour. It turned out to be a fracture of the tibia. Nevertheless, he signed a two-year contract with Moss, as a direct replacement of Leif Erik Andersen in central defense. The injury was severe, keeping him away from playing for five months. He underwent a strength training and swimming regime before he could do light ball training after four and a half months.

In his actual debut, in the 1996 cup against Fana, Svensson scored the only goal, an unopposed header in the box, sending Moss through to the fourth round. However, only minutes after the goal, he was injured again and stretchered off. He would now miss the entirety of the 1996 season. His comeback would come in a March 1997 friendly match.

Svensson's performances in the 1997 Norwegian First Division were mixed. According to Moss Avis, Svensson was the worst performer against Drøbak-Frogn in May, "almost setting a Swedish record in weak passes", but then man of the match against Hamkam in June, the "ubestridte ener". He also managed to score in the return leg against Drøbak-Frogn.

By July, Moss Dagblad opined that Svensson had played badly in matches, but was better in training. He had not discussed a contract renewal thus far. In September, Moss Avis wrote that the contract would not be removed, but that Svensson played well against Hødd, imploring him to continue to maybe warrant a contract extension.

Ahead of the 1998 season, Svensson had transfer options in Aalesund and Skeid. He signed a two-year deal with Aalesund. Shortly after joining Aalesund, Svensson became injured again, with a tackle to his leg resulting in a strained ligament.

Svensson did not appreciate his stay in Ålesund, and returned to Degerfors in the summer of 1998. In a loss to Västerås, Svensson was embroiled in an unprecedented hubbub. Following two late red cards for his team, Svensson "snapped" when a free kick was awarded against him, and shot the ball directly at the referee.
