= Dalmo (footballer, born 1984) =

Brazilian footballer

Personal information
- Full name: Dalmo Inácio da Silva
- Date of birth: 18 February 1984 (age 42)
- Place of birth: Sobral Pinto, Brazil
- Height: 1.90 m (6 ft 3 in)
- Position: Striker

Team information
- Current team: Cerâmica

Youth career
- 1994–2002: Cruzeiro

Senior career*
Years	Team	Apps	(Gls)
2003–2004	Democrata-GV	32	(9)
2004–2005	Rioverdense	27	(9)
2005–2006	Goiás	17	(8)
2007–2009	Itumbiara	?	(?)
2009–2010	1. FC Brno	12	(2)
2010	Chernomorets Burgas	1	(0)
2012–	Cerâmica	4	(0)
- * Club domestic league appearances and goals as of June 27, 2012

Dalmo Inácio da Silva or simply Dalmo (born February 18, 1984) is a Brazilian footballer who currently plays for Cerâmica.

== Career ==
Dalmo was invited by Bulgarian side Chernomorets Burgas to join a trial period, which began in February 2010. During the winter camp in Antalya he scored a goal in a friendly match against FC Winterthur. On February 18, 2010, Dalmo signed a two years contract with the club. Shortly after he was released.
