= Gustav Hedenvind-Eriksson =

Swedish novelist (1880–1967)

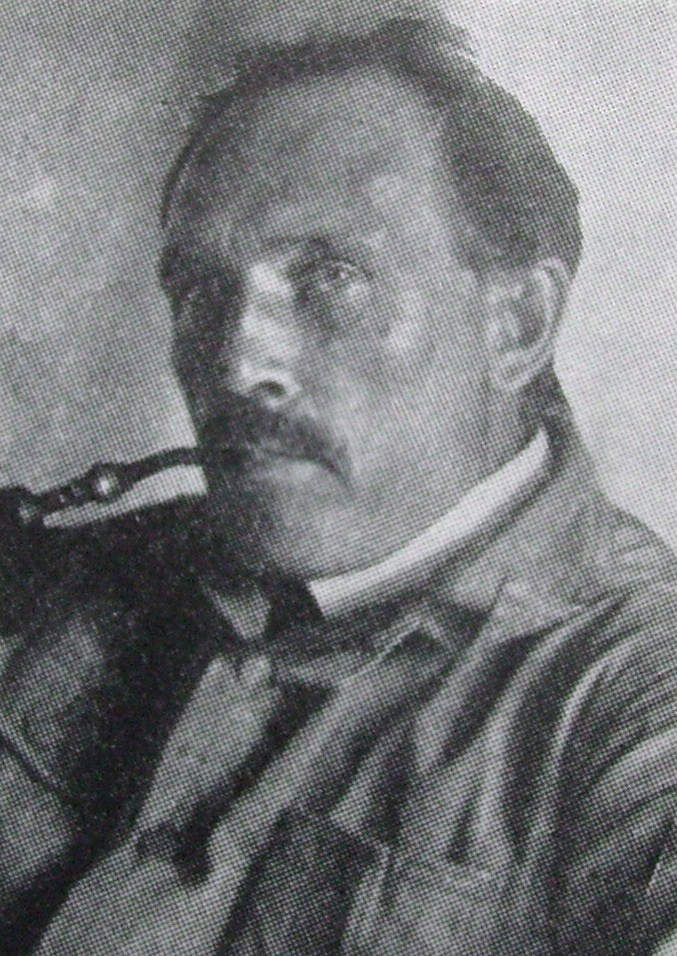
- Born: 17 May 1880; Jämtland County
- Died: 17 April 1967 (aged 86); Stockholm
- Occupation: Novelist
- Awards: Dobloug Prize (1959)

Gustav Hedenvind-Eriksson (17 May 1880 – 17 April 1967) was a Swedish novelist. He made his literary debut in 1910 with the novel Ur en fallen skog. Later novels are Vid Eli vågor from 1914, Järnets gåta from 1921, and På friköpt jord from 1930. His books often deal with his experiences as a logger, a navvy or a sailor, and are inspired by the oral storytelling he heard as a child in Jämtland. He was awarded the Dobloug Prize in 1959.
