= Annicka Engblom =

Swedish politician (born 1967)

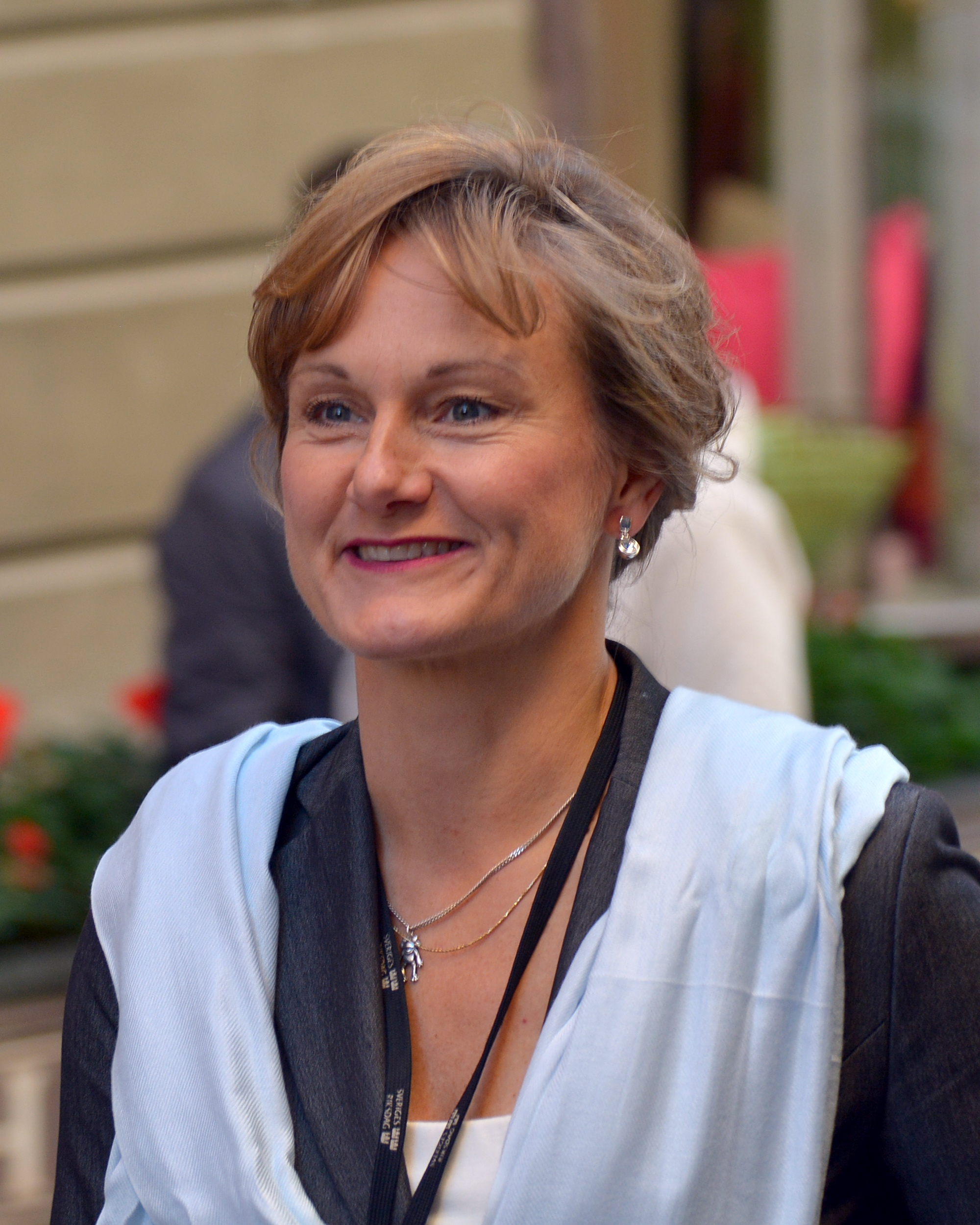

Member of the Riksdag
- In office 2006–2022

Personal details
- Born: 15 June 1967
- Political party: Moderate Party

Annicka Engblom (born 15 June 1967) is a Swedish politician of the Moderate Party who was a member of the Riksdag from 2006 to 2022.

In addition to her committee assignments, Engblom has been a member of the Swedish delegation to the Parliamentary Assembly of the Council of Europe (PACE) since 2017, where she has served on the Committee on Rules of Procedure, Immunities and Institutional Affairs (since 2020); the Committee on Culture, Science, Education and Media (since 2019); the Sub-Committee on Media and Information Society (since 2019); Committee on Equality and Non-Discrimination (2017–2019).
