= Jeppe Johnsson =

Swedish politician (born 1951)

Jeppe Johnsson (born 1951) is a Swedish politician of the Moderate Party. He served as member of the Riksdag from 3 October 1994 to 15 August 2009.
