= Claes Elmstedt =

Swedish politician (1928–2018)

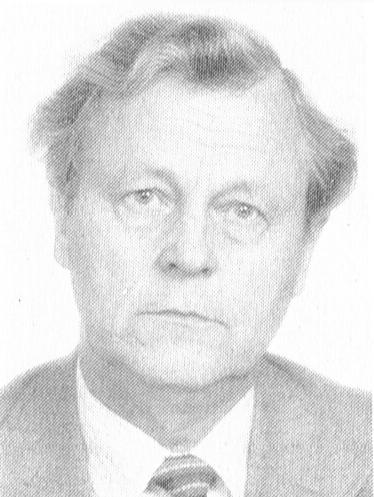

member of the Riksdag
- In office 1965–1984

Minister of Communications (Transport)
- In office 1981 to 1982

county governor of Gotland County
- In office 1984 to 1991

Personal details
- Born: 31 March 1928
- Died: 14 February 2018
- Political party: Centre Party

Claes Yngve Elmstedt (31 March 1928 – 14 February 2018 in Ronneby) was a Swedish politician. He was a member of the Centre Party. He was elected to the second chamber of parliament from 1965 to 1970, and then from 1971 of the unicameral parliament until 1984.

He was Minister of Communications (Transport) in the government of Thorbjörn Fälldin 1981 to 1982 and county governor of Gotland County from 1984 to 1991.

Preceded by Olof Johansson	Minister of Communications (Transport); 1981–1982	Succeeded by Curt Boström
Preceded by Lars Westerberg	Governor of Gotland County; 1984–1991	Succeeded by Thorsten Andersson
