= Karolina Widerberg =

Swedish politician (born 1984)

Member of the Riksdag
- Incumbent
- Assumed office 28 September 2026
- Constituency: Blekinge County

Personal details
- Born: 16 May 1984 (age 42) Sweden
- Party: Sweden Democrats

Karolina Widerberg (born 15 May 1984) is a Swedish politician from the Sweden Democrats. She has been a member of the Riksdag since 2026, elected for the Blekinge County constituency.

== Biography ==
Widerberg lives in Mjällby and works as a physical education teacher at Mjällby School.

Widerberg has been active in municipal politics for the Sweden Democrats in Sölvesborg Municipality. She was, among other things, chair of the municipality's leisure and culture committee during the 2019–2022 term.

She has also been a member of the diocesan council in the Diocese of Lund for the Sweden Democrats.

In the 2026 Swedish general election, Widerberg was elected as a member of parliament for the Blekinge County constituency.

== See also ==
- List of members of the Riksdag, 2026–2030
