= Socialist Solidarity Committee for Czechoslovakia =

Czechsvlovach-Swedish solidarity committee

Socialist Solidarity Committee for Czechoslovakia (Socialistiska Solidaritetskommittén för Tjeckoslovakien), a group formed in Sweden in 1968 by socialists and communists protesting against the intervention of the Warsaw Pact countries against the 'Prague Spring'. The committee supported the January 1968 reform line of the Communist Party of Czechoslovakia.

Chairman of the committee was Hjalmar Werner, secretary Nils Lalander and treasurer Hertta Fischer.

== Sources ==
- Socialistiska Solidaritetskommittén för Tjeckoslovakien, Charta 77 - Dokument om människorätt i Kafkas Prag, 1978 (ISBN 91-29-50585-2).
