= Peter Jeppsson =

Swedish politician (born 1968)

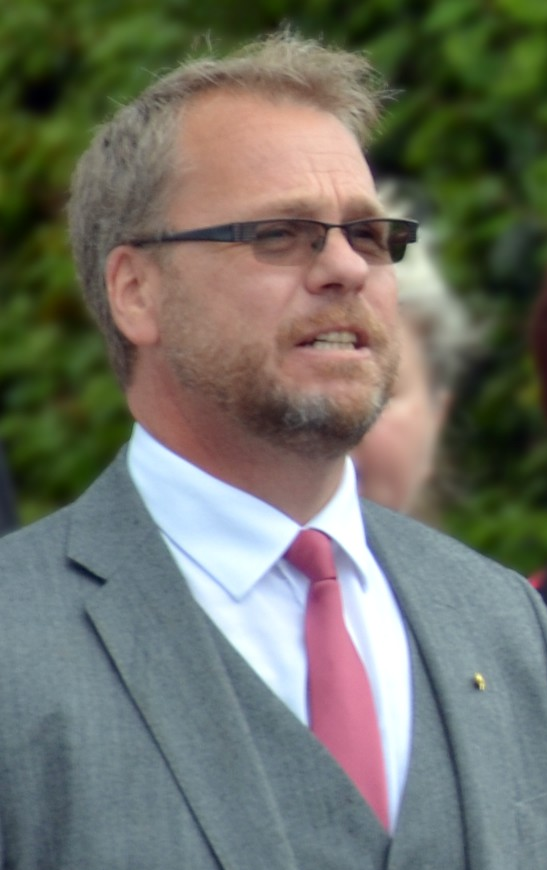

member of the Riksdag
- In office 2006–2018

Personal details
- Political party: Social Democratic

Peter Jeppsson (born 1968), is a Swedish Social Democratic politician who served as member of the Riksdag from 2006 to 2018.
