= Magnus Andersson (footballer, born 1967) =

Swedish footballer

Personal information
- Date of birth: 29 July 1967 (age 59)
- Position: Midfielder

Senior career*
| Years | Team | Apps | (Gls) |
| 1990–1991 | IFK Trelleborg | | |
| 1992–1996 | Trelleborgs FF | | |
- * Club domestic league appearances and goals

Magnus Andersson (born 29 July 1967) is a Swedish retired football midfielder.
