= David Dalmo =

Swedish dancer

David Dalmo (born 1972), is a Swedish dancer, world champion in Lindy Hop (1995), former member of The Rhythm Hot Shots and member of the Bounce Streetdance Company. David D has choreographed this on So You Think You Can Dance - Scandinavia:

- Finale: Mynte Lagoni and Martin Gæbe (Hip-Hop), Mona-Jeanette Berntsen and Daniel Koivunen (Lindy Hop)
