= Rödeby =

- Location within Blekinge Location within Sweden
- Coordinates: 56°15′N 15°36′E
- Country: Sweden
- Province: Blekinge
- County: Blekinge County
- Municipality: Karlskrona Municipality

Area
  - Total: 3.33 km^{2} (1.29 sq mi)

Population (31 December 2010)
  - Total: 3,402
  - Density: 1,023/km^{2} (2,650/sq mi)
- Time zone: UTC+1 (CET)
  - Summer (DST): UTC+2 (CEST)

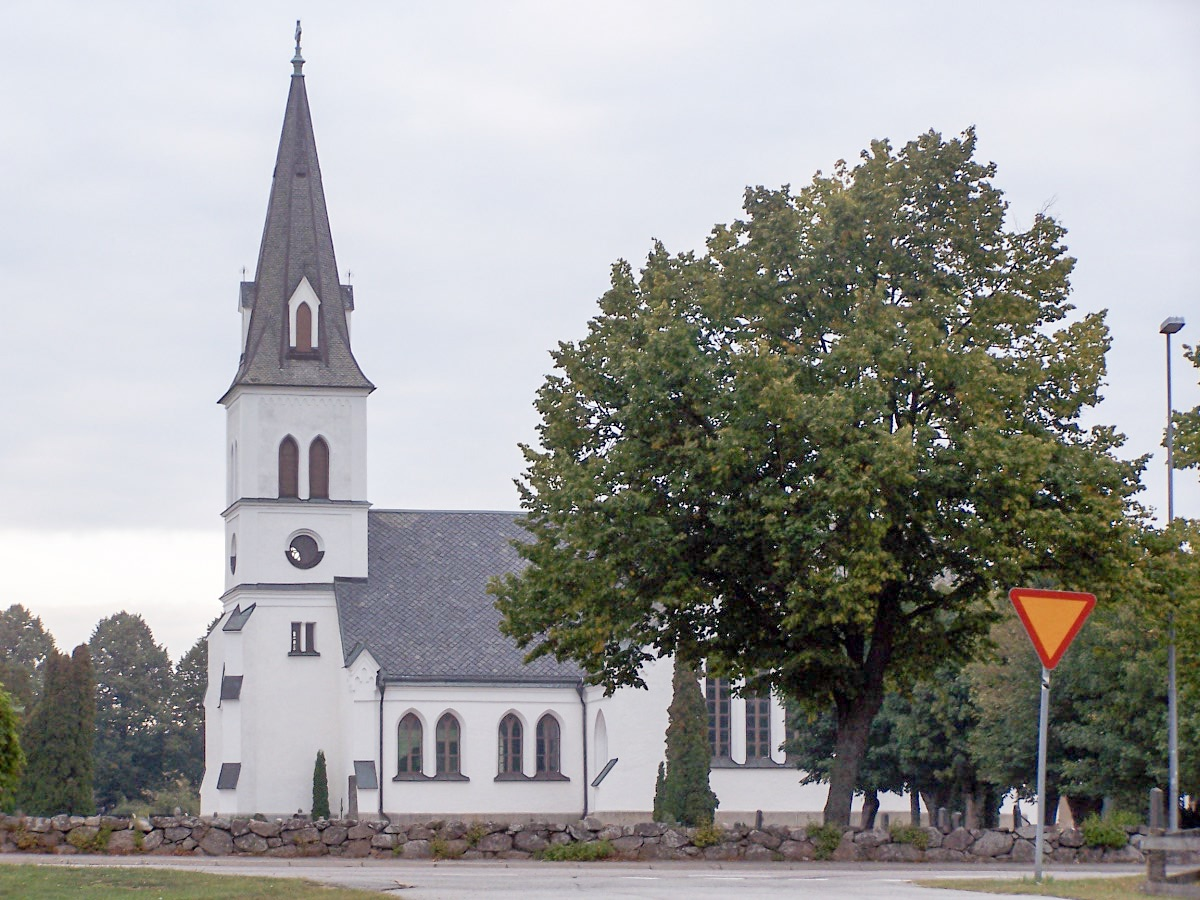
Rödeby church, Karlskrona, Sweden.

Rödeby is a locality situated in Karlskrona Municipality, Blekinge County, Sweden with 3,402 inhabitants as of 2010. It is located about 12 kilometers north of Karlskrona.

Notable things found in Rödeby are Rödeby kyrka, Rödebyskolan ("The Rödeby School") and the local football team Rödeby AIF. One of the municipality's three water towers is also located there.
