= Johnny Gylling =

Swedish politician (born 1956)

Johnny Gylling is a Swedish Christian democratic politician, member of the Riksdag 1998–2006. He is the owner of a consulting business, GE 99 (Good Enterprise 99 AB).

== Biography ==
=== Early life ===
Sven Johnny Gylling was born March 25, 1956, in Nättraby parish, Blekinge county (located in south-eastern Götaland and whose city of residence is Karlskrona),

=== Education ===
1976: Theological education, 2-year Mariannelunds Folk High-school.

1980: Truck mechanic 2-year vocational school, Ronneby AMU.

1986: IT systems analyst/programmer 60 hp at the University of Växjö

1990: Basic economy for enterprises 22,5 hp at the University of Karlskrona/Ronneby.

1996: studied Project management at Wenell and Negotiations at Almega.

1997: Personal leadership, Leadership Management International.

2000 - 2013: Studied Business English.

2011: Corporate Social Responsibility (ISO26000) 7,5 hp in the Luleå University of Technology

2019: Certified Board Director and Sustainability Course (Swedish Academy of Board Directors).

=== Career ===
1972–1986: Held jobs as a bus driver, truck mechanic, youth pastor, and storage worker.

1986–1989: He worked as a systems analyst/programmer in Karlskronavarvet.

1989–1996: Programmer/systems analyst at Sema Group, Ronneby.

1996–1998: Manager of consultants at Sema Group, Ronneby.

1998–2006: Participated in the Transport Committee while a member of the Swedish Parliament.

2007–2014: Coordinated CSR and government relations for Telenor Sweden.

2014 – Present: CSR and sustainability advisor at GE(owner and consultant).

=== Positions held ===
Gylling was group leader and part-time municipal councilor in Karlskrona municipality 1992 – 1995.

He was a regular Member of Parliament 1998–2006. In the Riksdag, he was a member of the traffic committee 1998–2006.

In 2006, he was the government's investigator into the parking legislation.

Sven Johnny Gylling is an author, and he's published notable articles like, In the Corridors of Power – A handbook for new parliamentarians, Proposals for a new parking regulation SOU, Article in “e-guide for parliamentarians”, The Hansard Society.

=== Awards ===
2018 Mentor of the Year in Blekinge - Nyföretagarcentrum.
