= Women in warfare (1500–1699) =

Aspect of women's history

Women have played a leading role in active warfare. The following is a list of prominent women in war and their exploits from about 1500 up to about 1699.

Only women active in direct warfare, such as warriors, spies, and women who actively led armies are included in this list.

For women in warfare in what is now the United States during this time period, see Timeline of women in war in the United States, pre-1945.

== Timeline of women in warfare from 1500 to 1699 ==
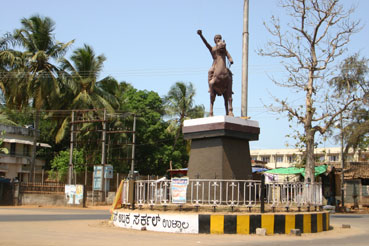
Abbakka Chowta

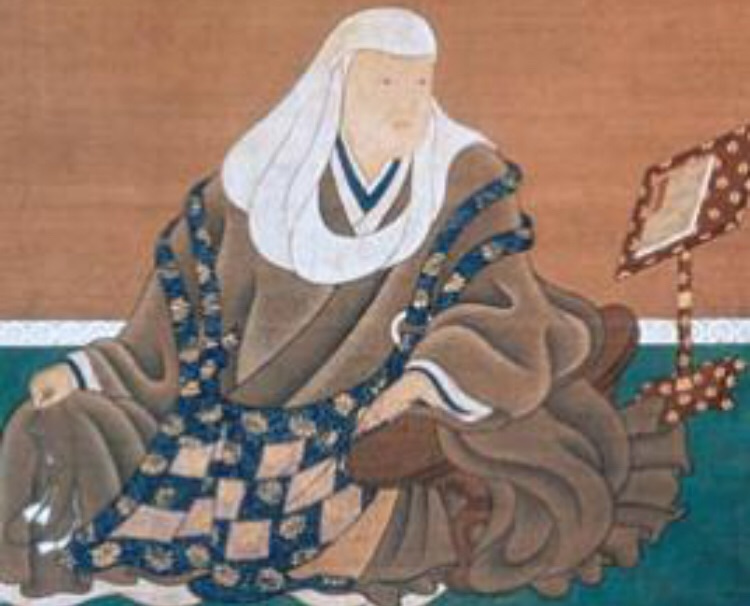
Maeda Matsu

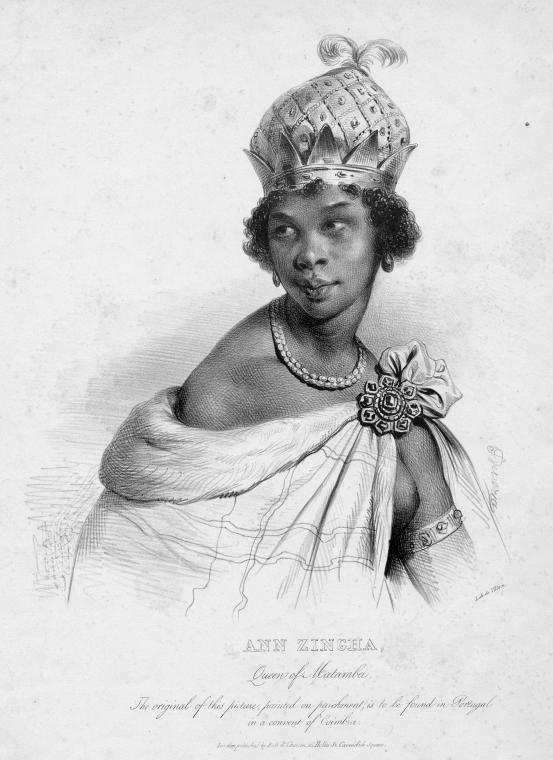
Nzinga of Ndongo and Matamba

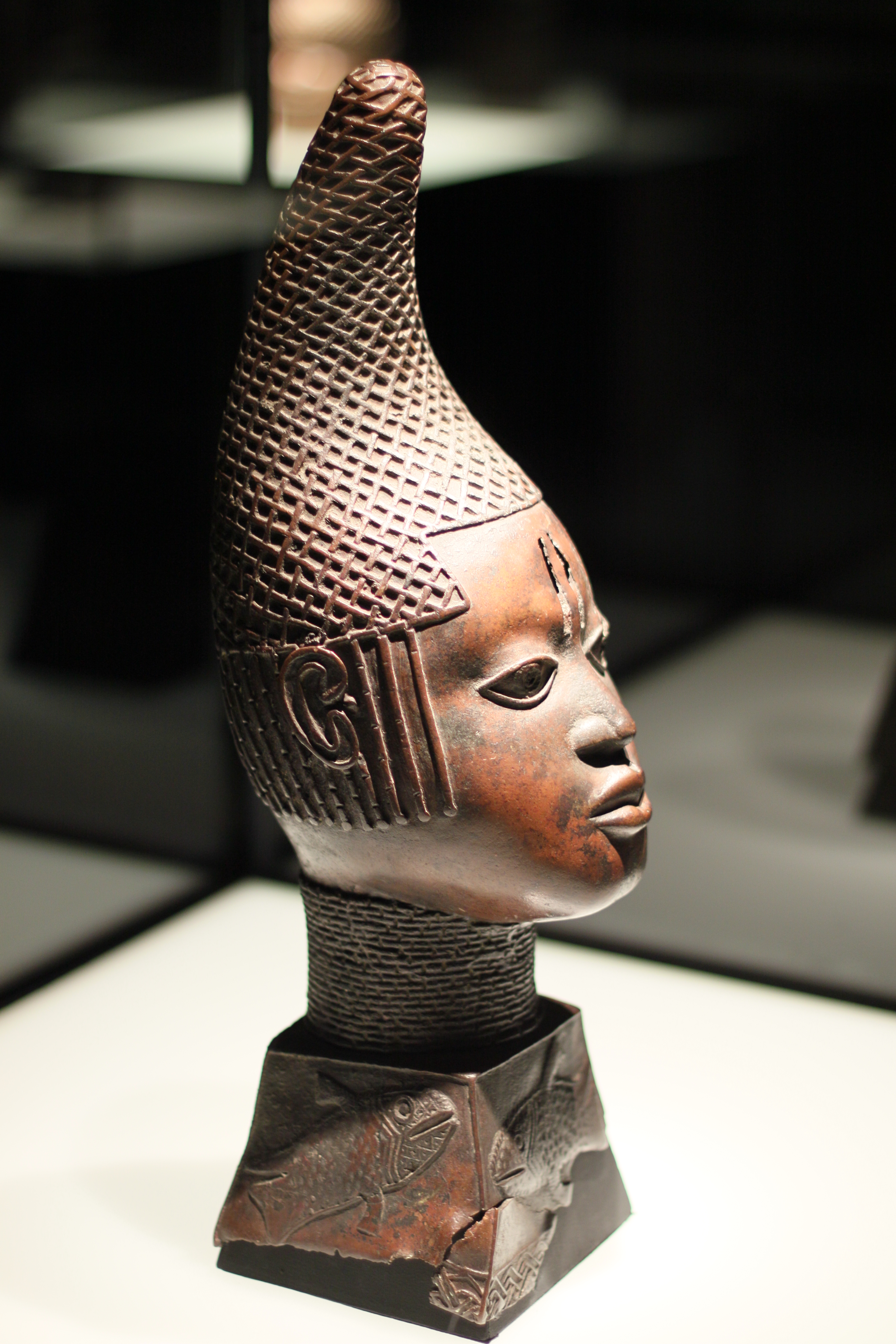
Idia

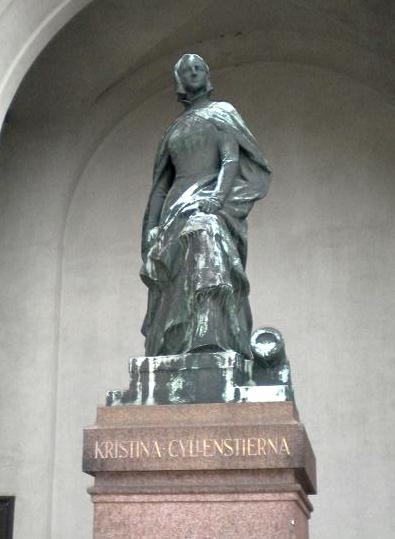
Christina Gyllenstierna

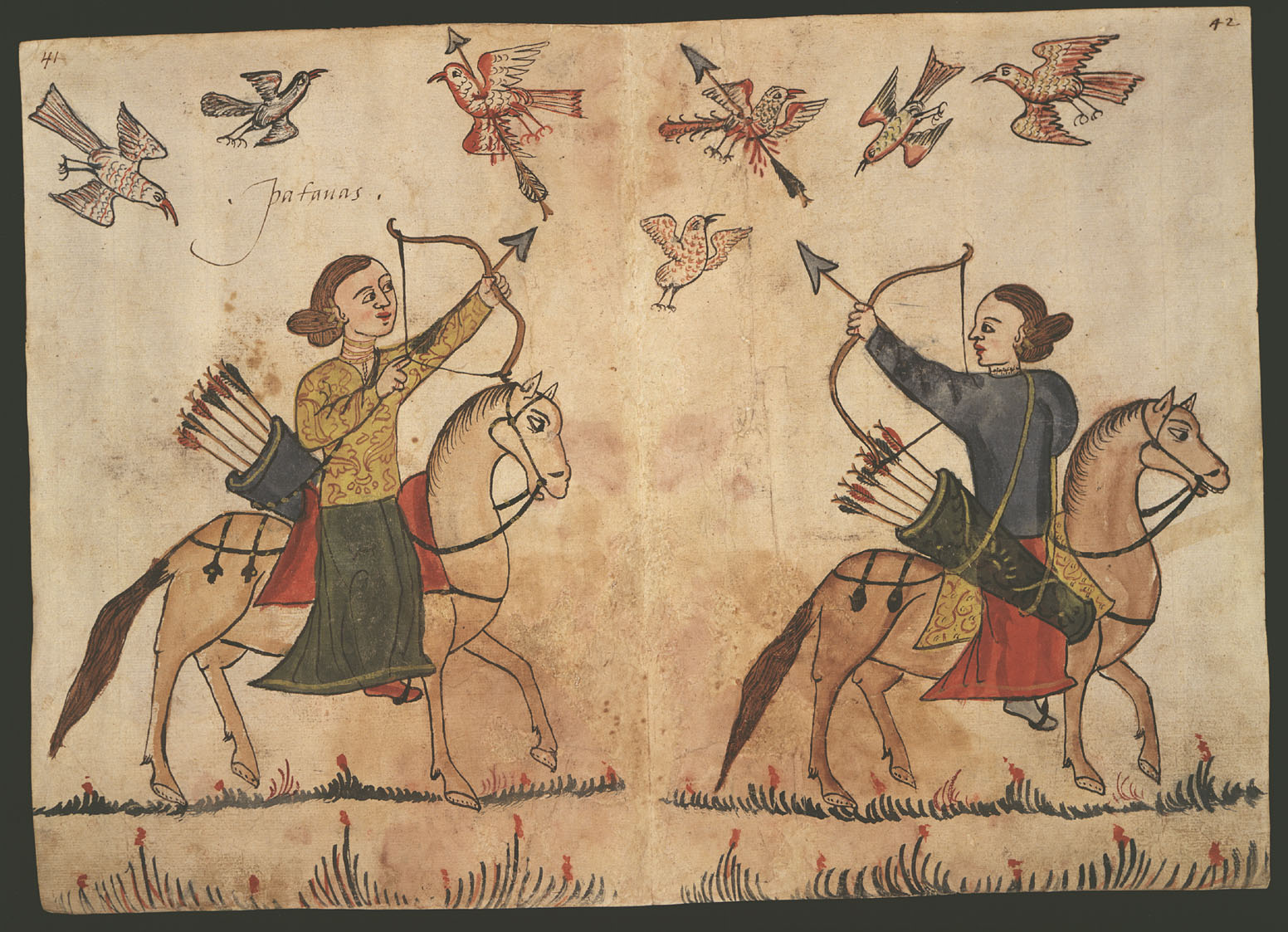
Women of Patna, c. 1540

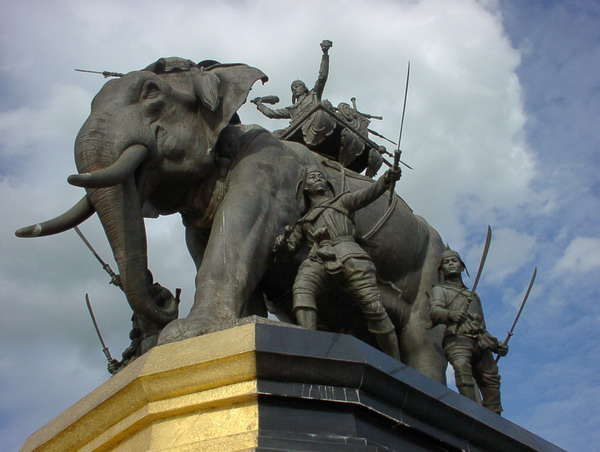
Suriyothai

Kenau Simonsdochter Hasselaer

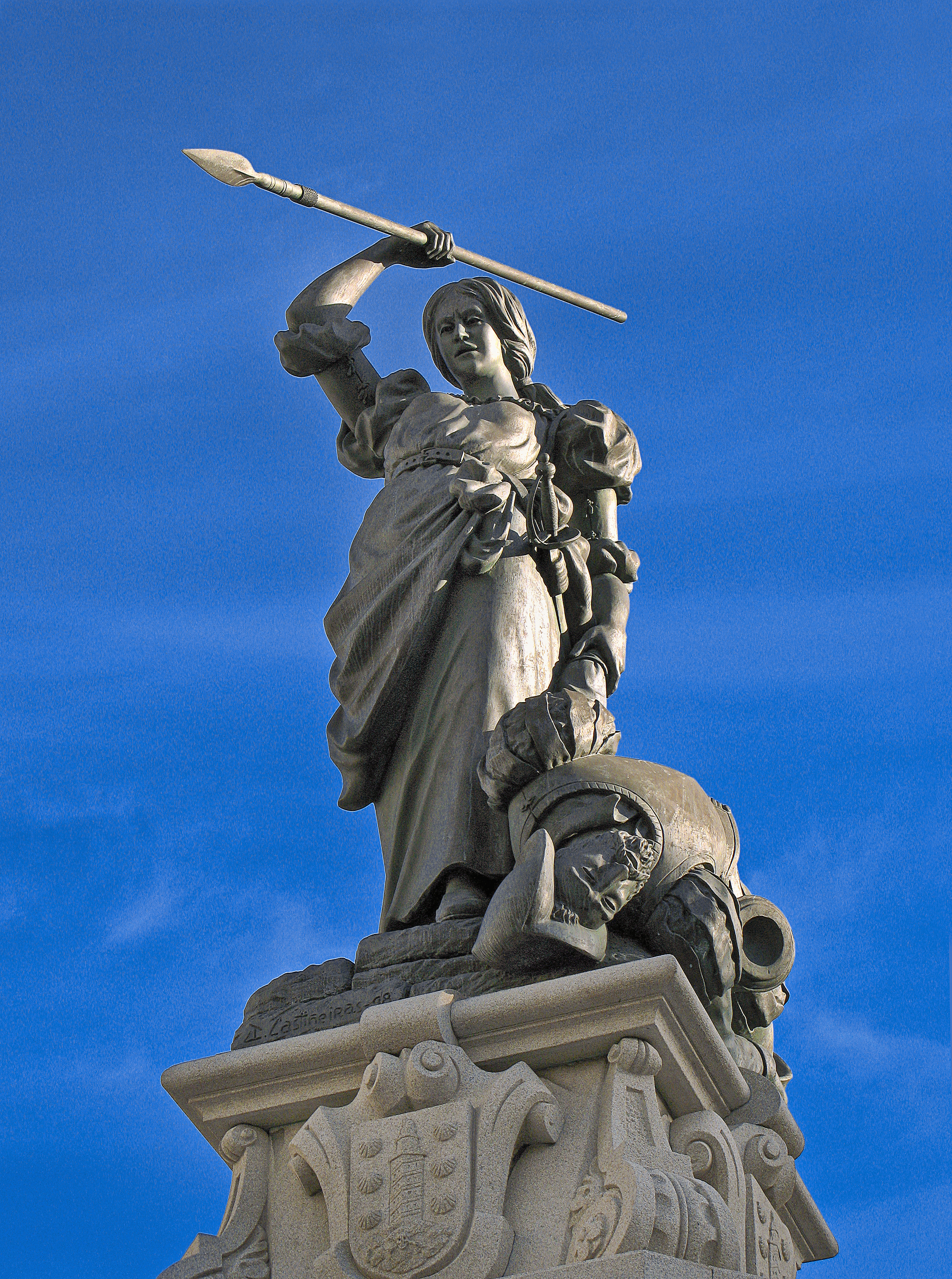
Maria Pita

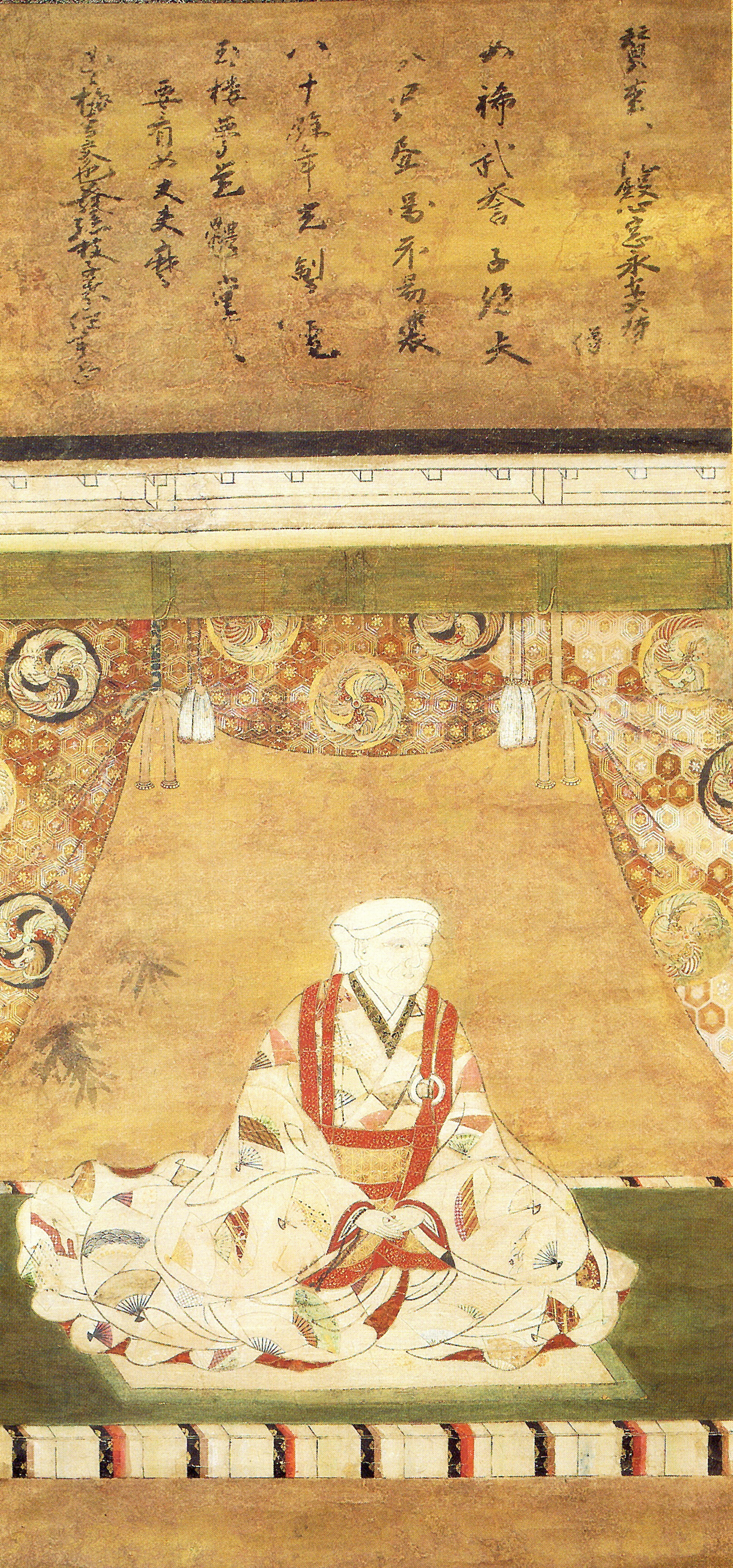
Katō Tsune

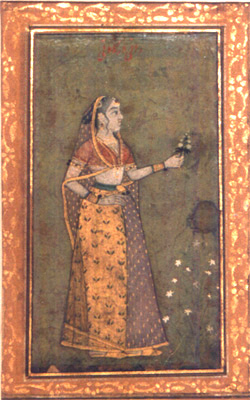
Rani Durgavati

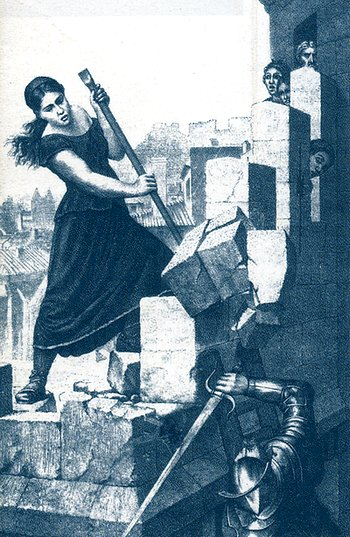
Marguerite Delaye

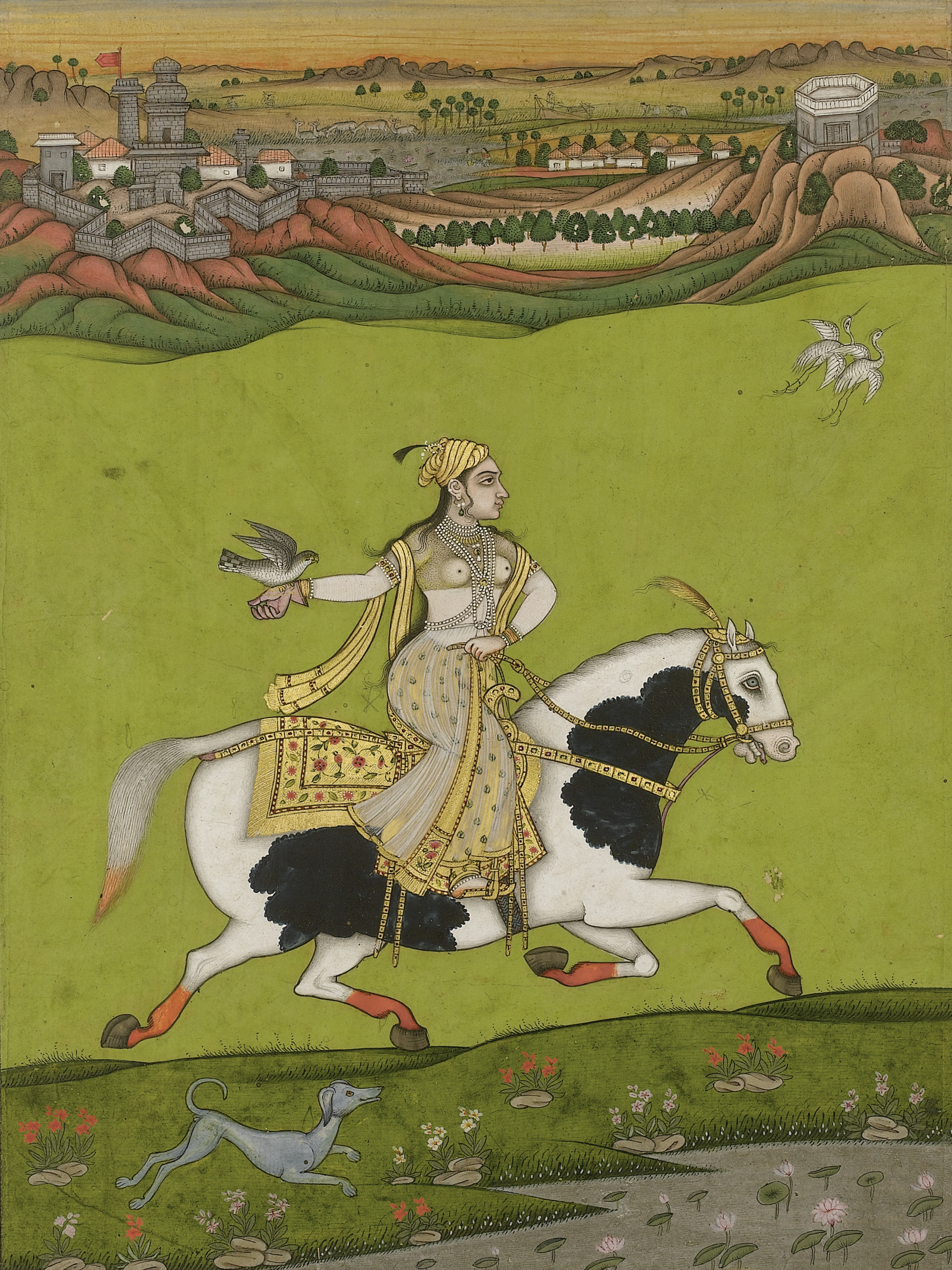
Chand Bibi

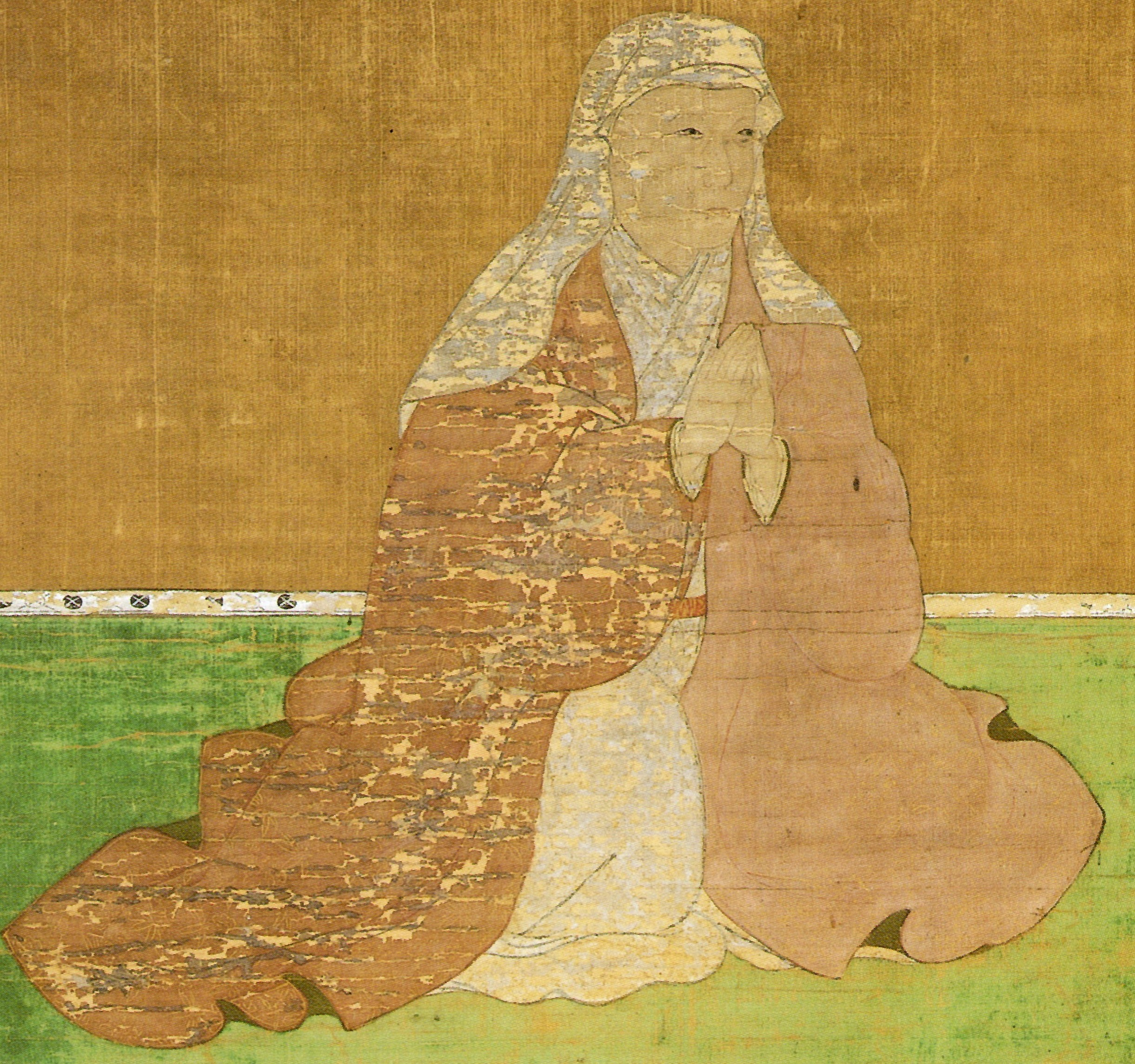
Numata Jakō

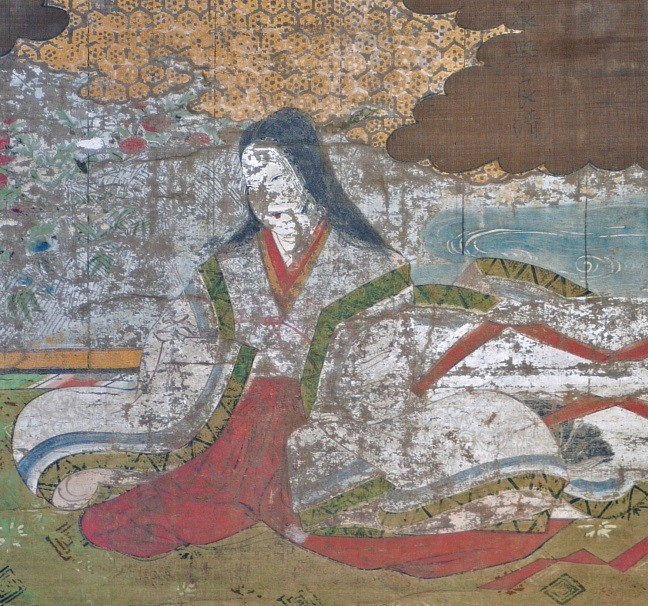
Tachibana Ginchiyo

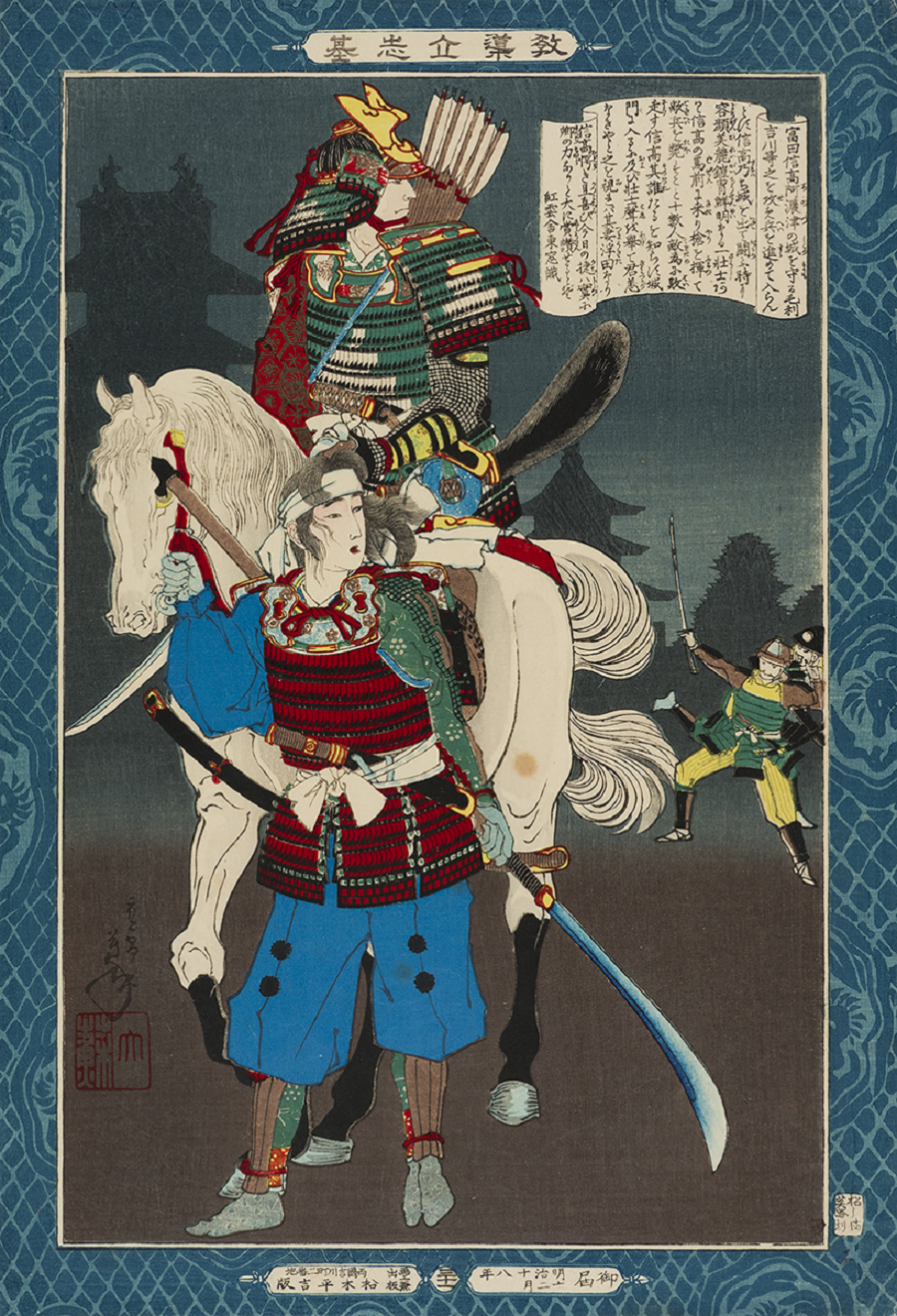
Yuki no Kata

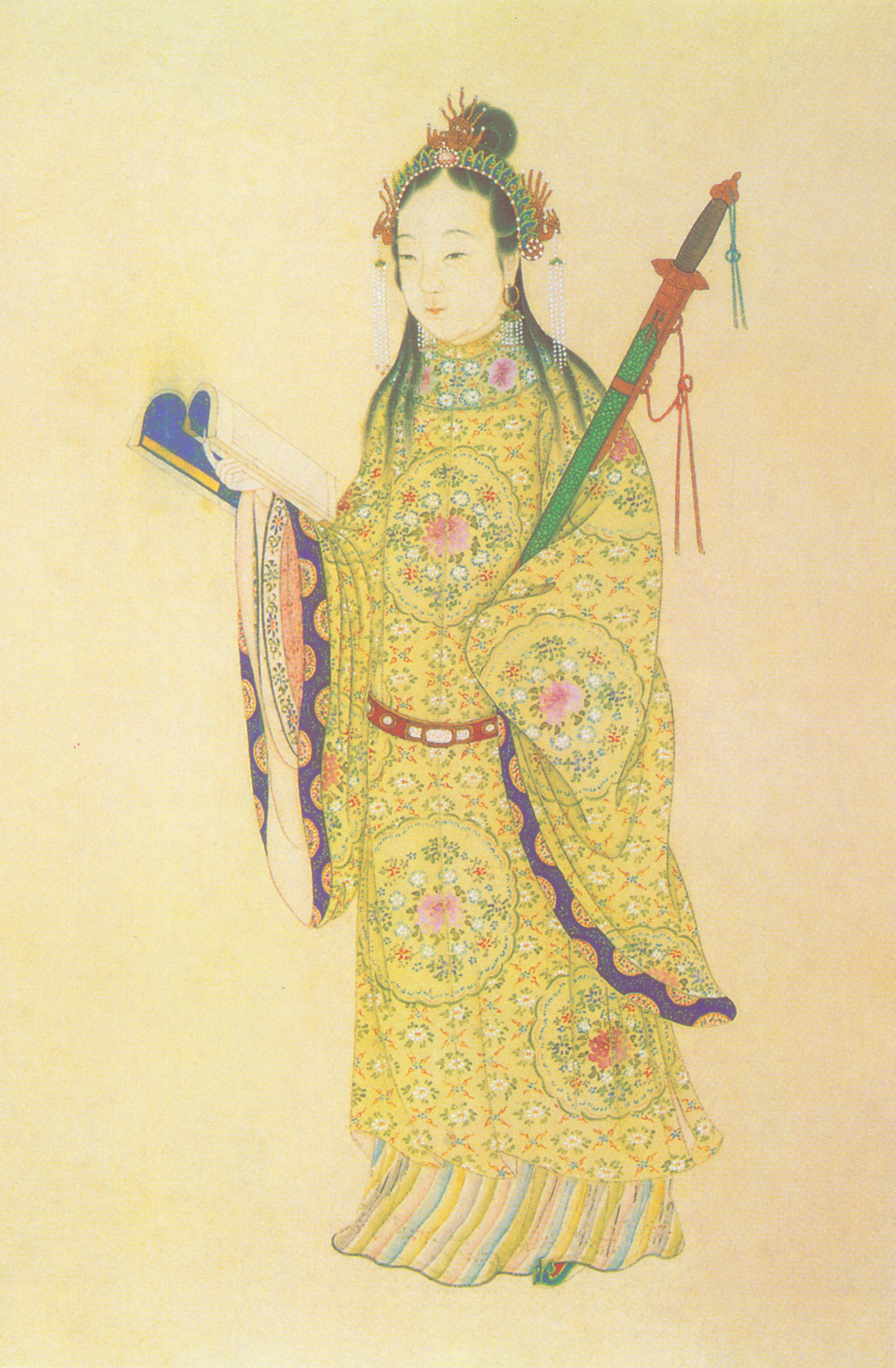
Qin Liangyu

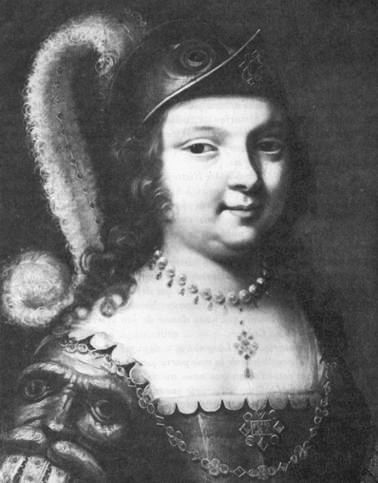
Françoise-Marie Jacquelin

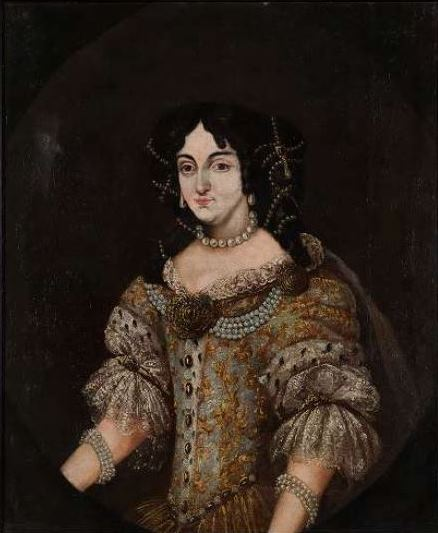
Ilona Zrínyi

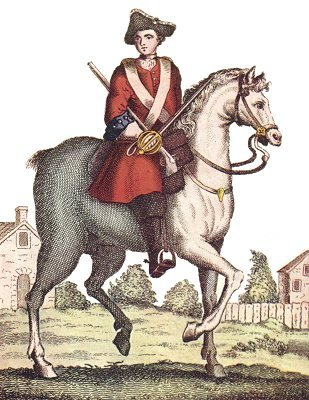
Kit Cavanagh

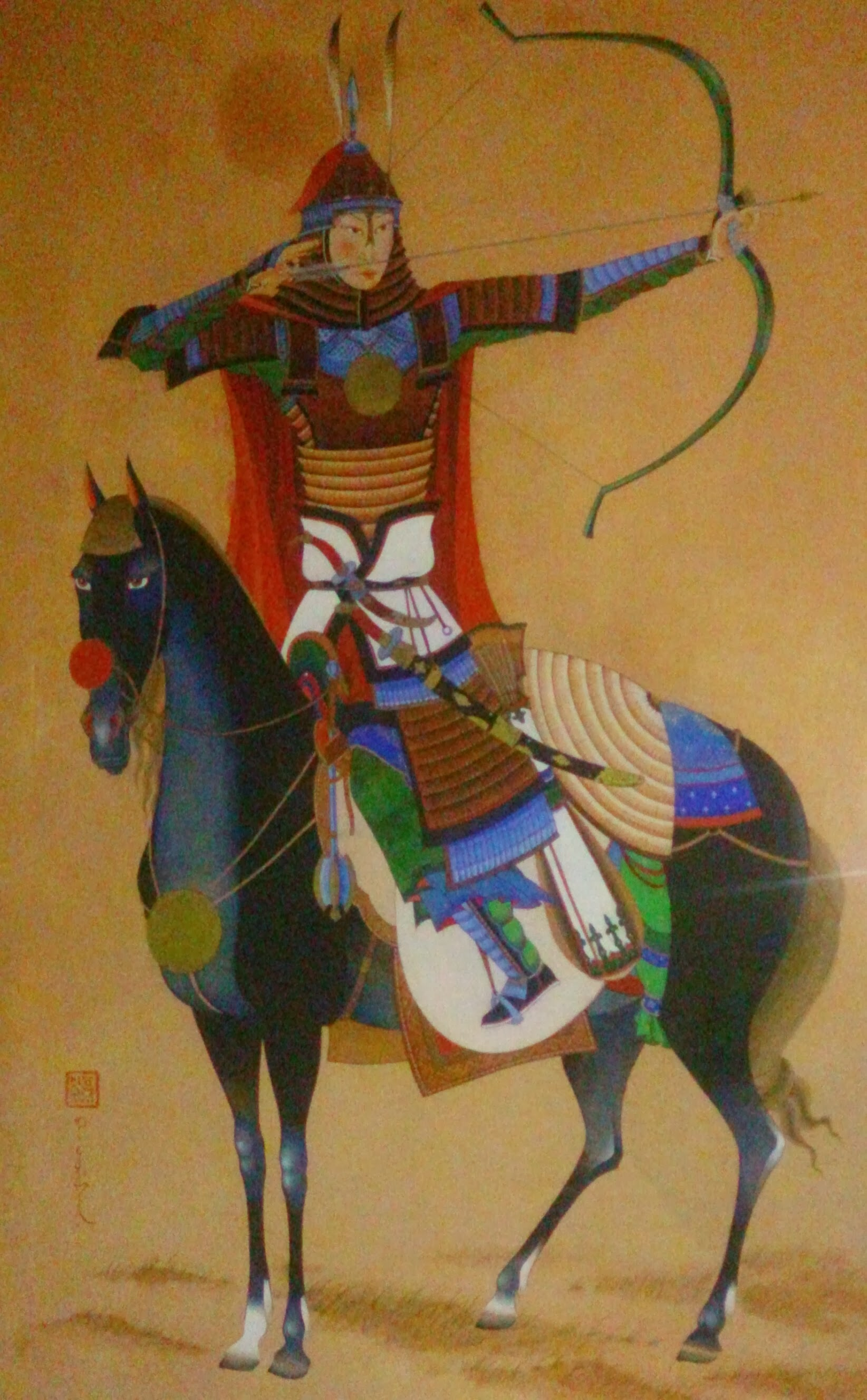
Queen Anu

=== 1500–1550 ===
- Early 16th century: Christopher Columbus reports being fired upon by female archers. Militarists accompanying Francisco de Orellana, Francisco Pizarro and Rodrigo de Bastidas report women fighting alongside men in South America. Various Spanish women fight as conquistadors along the men under Cortés's expedition; among them are María Estrada and Beatriz Bermúdez de Velasco.
- 1521: Cortés' advisor La Malinche and Tlaxcalan wives of Spanish conquistadors, like María Luisa Xicoténcatl, act as military leaders during the siege of Tenochtitlan.
- Early 16th century: Reign of Amina, ruler of the Hausa empire in Nigeria. She personally led armies on successful campaigns.
- 16th century: Abbakka, a ruler of Tulu Nadu in India fights the Portuguese army.
- 16th century: Maeda Matsu saves the Maeda clan from Tokugawa Ieyasu in Battle of Sekigahara and Siege of Osaka.
- 16th century: Mah Chuchak Begum leads her army in person and defeats Munim Khan at Jalalabad.
- 16th century: Portuguese explorers report that a group of female warriors existed in the Congo, and that their king assigned regions where only female children were raised. Angola resists the Portuguese under Queen Nzinga of Ndongo and Matamba.
- 16th century: Jeanne d'Albret is involved in the French Wars of Religion. She often accompanied Admiral de Coligny to the battlefield where the fighting was at its most intense; together they inspected the defences and rallied the Huguenot forces.
- 16th century: Sikhism founded. One of its tenets is equality for women which extends to allowing them into participate in combat and warfare. See Category:Female Sikh warriors for more information.
- 16th-century: Fujishiro Gozen dies fighting in battle.
- 16th century: Louise Labé dressed in male clothing and fought as a knight on horseback in the ranks of the Dauphin (afterwards Henry II) at the siege of Perpignan.
- 16th century: Orompoto of the Oyo Empire fights at the Battle of Illayi.
- Early 1500s: Idia, mother of Esigie, the Oba of Benin, is described as a great warrior, and receives much credit for her son's conquest of the Igala.
- 1501: Christina of Saxony holds the city of Stockholm for the Danish during a Swedish rebellion against the Danish.
- 1502: Anne Rud defends the Bohus Fortress in the absence of her spouse, commander Henrich Krummedige, during his war with Alv Knutsson.
- 1503: Costanza d'Avalos, Duchess of Francavilla leads the defence of the island fortress of Ischia against the French.
- 1505: Ingeborg Tott defends her fief Häme Castle in Finland against the attack from another noble fiefholder.
- 1511: According to popular legend, Gertruid Bolwater defends Venlo.
- 1511–1513: Gunilla Bese, widow of the governor of Vyborg Castle, defends it against the Russians.
- 1513: Catherine of Aragon acts as Regent for Henry VIII and attends the field at the Battle of Flodden Field dressed in armor.
- 1513–1515: Quilago, queen of the Cochasquí in Ecuador, defense her area against the expansion of the Inca Empire.
- 1520: Christina Gyllenstierna becomes the leader and commander of the defence of Sweden and Stockholm during the war between Denmark and Sweden.
- 1520: Swedish noble Anna Eriksdotter (Bielke) commands the city of Kalmar in place of her dead spouse during the war between Denmark and Sweden.
- 1520: Women participate actively in the defense of the Swedish city of Kalmar against the Danes. In his famous chronicle from 1555, Olaus Magnus briefly note that during the defense of Kalmar, the female inhabitants of the city participated in the defense as bravely as did the men. Anna Bielke also defends Kalmar.
- 1520: Barbro Stigsdotter helps the Swedish rebel and future King Gustav Vasa to escape capture by the Danes and are therefore hailed as a war heroine in Sweden.
- 1521: Maria Pacheco Padilla defends the city of Toledo, Spain for six months after her husband falls in battle.
- 1521–1523: Abbess Anna Leuhusen participates in the secret traffic in and out of the city of Stockholm during the Swedish War of Liberation.
- 1522–1524: Sati Sadhani was the queen of the Chutia kingdom. Born in the capital of Shadia, Sadhani's father Dharmadhwajapal married her to Nitipal or Nitai and handed over the rule to his son-in-law. The Ahoms invaded Shadia and demanded the beautiful queen Sadhani to be made their king. After this, the archer king Nita fought against the Ahoms and lost his life. After this, Queen Sadhani took over the rule and fought against the Ahoms. She formed an army of women and fought herself. Ultimately the Ahom army adopted various tactics to disperse the Chutia army and the Ahom king proposed to accept Sadhani as his queen again. But she refused to accept slavery and sacrificed herself by jumping from the mountain. Chutia-Ahom conflicts (1512–1522) in Ancient Assam of North East India.
- 1527: Euphemia Leslie conquers Elcho Castle.
- 1534: Hille Feicken and the women of the Anabaptist regime of Münster participate in the defense of the city.
- 1538: Veronica Gambara organizes a successful defense of Correggio against a siege.
- 1539–1540: Gaitana of the Paez leads the indigenous people of Colombia in armed resistance against the Spanish.
- ~1540: The Codice Casanatense describes the residents of Patna as "very warlike", with the women of the city accompanying the men to fight, followed by an illustration of two Patnan women shooting arrows from horseback.
- 1540: Gaspar de Carvajal, a Dominican friar, reports being attacked by a band of armed women while travelling in Brazil.
- 1541: Ōhōri Tsuruhime leads an army into battle.
- 1543: According to legend, Catherine Ségurane defends the city of Nice, France.
- 1545, February 12: Scottish women fight in the Battle of Ancrum Moor. Among them is Lilliard, after whom Lilliard Edge is named.
- 1546: Isabel Madeira, Isabel Fernandes, Catarina Lopes, Isabel Dias and others women serve in the defense of the city walls during the siege of Diu in Portuguese India.
- 1547: Scotland, Mariotta Haliburton defends and negotiates the surrender of Hume Castle.
- 1548: Thai queen Suriyothai, along with princess Tepastri, went into battle on war elephants with King Maha Chakkraphat against Burmese invaders.
- Mid 1500s: Inés de Suárez, fought alongside Pedro de Valdivia during the conquest of Chile. She led the Spanish forces that repulsed the attack of Michimalonco on the newly founded Santiago in 1541.
- 1548–1580: Likely time period for the reign of legendary Malaysian queen Siti Wan Kembang. According to legend, she rode into battle with a sword, leading women horse riders.

=== 1550–1599 ===
- 1546: Second Siege of Diu. Isabel Madeira (captain), Catarina Lopes, Garcia Rodrigues, Isabel Fernandes, and Isabel Dias, formed a group of female combatants who fought in front of the battle against the Turks.
- 1550s: Siena, Italy falls under siege. Every able citizen was mobilized in the effort to build fortifications, and Laudomia Forteguerri leads a group of 1,000 noble and artisan women to aid in the construction.
- 1555: Zhuang Chinese woman Wa Shi leads troops into battle on behalf of the Ming Dynasty.
- 1557: Wa Shi leads over 6000 Zhuang infantry against pirates and successfully defeated them at Wangjiangjing (north of modern Jiaxing). She personally fought in combat, using a dao sword.
- 1558: Scotland, Janet Beaton marches at the head of an armed party consisting of two hundred members of her clan to the Kirk of St. Mary of the Lowes in Yarrow, where she knocked down the doors in an attempt to apprehend Sir Peter Cranstoun.
- 1564: Indian queen Rani Durgavati leads her forces against the Mughal army, but is defeated.
- 1565: Lady Shirai dies fighting in battle.
- December 1568: Otazu no kata dies in battle while accompanied by 18 armed women.
- 1569: Marguerite Delaye loses an arm in while fighting Admiral Coligny during his siege of Montélimar. A one-armed statue is erected in her honor.
- 1569: Brita Olofsdotter, widow after soldier Nils Simonsson, serves in the Finnish troop in the Swedish cavalry in Livonia; she is killed in battle, and king John III of Sweden orders for her salary to be paid to her family.
- 1569: Lady Agnes Campbell, married to Turlough Luineach O'Neill, Chieftain of the O'Neill's in Ulster, leads her Scottish dowry troops into battle.
- 1569: Lady Ichikawa defends Konomine castle.
- December 1569: Myōki defends Hio castle in Musashi Province against the Takeda clan attack.
- 1571: Maria la Bailadora participates as a member of the Marines at the Battle of Lepanto dressed as a male.
- 1572: In defense of the city during a siege of Haarlem by Spanish troops, which lasted from December 1572 to 1573, Kenau Simonsdochter Hasselaer (1526–1588) was described by a source as an unusually fearless woman who worked night and day carrying earth to the city walls to rebuild the defense line.
- 1572: Maria van Schooten participates in the defense during the siege of Haarlem by Spanish troops, dies and are granted a military funeral.
- 1573: Trijn Rembrands allegedly participates in the defence of Alkmaar.
- 1575: Kamehime takes an active part in the Battle of Nagashino.
- 1576: Portuguese explorer Pedro de Magalhães de Gandavo reports that some Tupinamba Indian women of northeastern Brazil "give up all the duties of women and imitate men, and follow men's pursuits as if they were not women. They wear the hair cut in the same way as the men, and go to war with bows and arrows and pursue game, always in company with men; each has a woman to serve her, to whom she says she is married, and they treat each other and speak with each other as man and wife."
- 1576–1578: Civil war in Georgia. Dedisimedi was personally involved in fighting, directing operations at Queli and Tmogvi.
- 1577: Ueno Tsuruhime led thirty-three women in a suicidal charge against the Mōri army in the Tsuneyama castle.
- 1577: Dutch woman Trijn van de Leemput allegedly rallies women in Utrecht against the Spanish.
- 1580: At the Battle of Senbon Matsubaru between Takeda Katsuyori and Hojo Ujinao, approximately 30% of the army in battle consisted of samurai women (Onna-musha).
- 1581: Marie-Christine de Lalaing defended the city of Tournai against Alexander Farnese, Duke of Parma, in 1581.
- 1584: Mary Ambree participates in the fighting against the Spanish for the city of Ghent. A ballad is eventually written about her.
- 1584–1590: Akai Teruko was the commander of Battle of Kanayama Castle at 70 years old. She fought in the Siege of Matsuida Castle alongside Toshiie and Hideyoshi at the Siege of Odawara.
- 1584: Katō Tsune helped her family and the Maeda troops resist Sassa Narimasa at the Siege of Suemori Castle by providing food and medical aid to injured warriors and arming herself with a naginata to fight beside them during the conflict.
- 1585–1586: Myorin led the defense of Tsurusaki Castle in Kyushu Campaign. When Shimazu army retreated from Tsurusaki, she advanced against 3,000 men and beheaded 2 enemy commanders in Terajihama.
- 1585 to 1589: Onamihime fought against her nephew, Date Masamune, in the Battle of Hitotoribashi, Battle of Suriagehara and Battle of Koriyama.
- 1587: Catharina Rose commands a women's battalion at the Spanish siege of Sluis in Flanders.
- 1587: An unnamed woman served in the guise of a man in the Dutch army.
- 1589: Maria Pita aids in the defence of Corunna against the English armada.
- 1589: An unnamed woman served in the guise of a man in the Dutch army.
- 1590: Kaihime led 200 cavalry men in the Siege of Oshi against the Toyotomi clan in the Odawara campaign.
- 1590: Françoise de Cezelli defeats the Spanish army during the battle of Leucate
- 1595: Indian Queen Chand Bibi fights the Mughals.
- 1597: Ebba Stenbock leads the defense of the Turku Castle in Finland after the death of its governor, her spouse.

=== 1600–1650 ===
- 17th century: Belawadi Mallamma is the first woman to form a women's army in Indian history, which she uses to fight against the Maratha Confederacy in the 17th century.
- 17th century to 1894: Dahomey Amazons act as an all-female regiment (under female command) of the west African Kingdom of Dahomey.
- 17th century: Antónia Rodrigues serves as man in the Portuguese army and is decorated for bravery in the war against the Moors.
- 17th century: A woman serves in the Dutch dragoons sometime between 1642 and 1710: she is found dead after a private duel, and her unnamed skeleton is donated to the University of Rotterdam (founded in 1642), where it is first documented in 1710 as "Aal de Dragonder".
- 17th century: Keumalahayati was killed in combat while attacking the Portuguese fleet at Teuluk Krueng Raya.
- 1600: Ikeda Sen fought alongside her brother Terumasa against the Western army led by Ishida Mitsunari in the Siege of Gifu castle.
- 1600: Numata Jakō, also known as Hosokawa Maria, participates in the defense during the Siege of Tanabe.
- 1600: Tachibana Ginchiyo the former leader of Tachibana clan fight in Siege of Yanagawa.
- 1600: Yuki no Kata defended the Anōtsu castle in the Battle of Sekigahara.
- 1600–1615: Okaji no Kata dressed as a man, she fought at the Battle of Sekigahara and the Siege of Osaka.
- 1604–1611: Margaretha, a woman from Frisia, serves in the Dutch army dressed as a man for seven years before discovery in 1611.
- 1607–1620: Catalina de Erauso fights as a soldier in Mexico, Peru, and Chile.
- 1611: Mayken Blomme serves in the Dutch navy dressed as a man.
- 1612: Swedish Emerentia Krakow defends the Fortress of Gullberg against the Danes in the place of her wounded spouse, the commendant of the fortress.
- 1612: According to legend, Prillar-Guri participates in the Battle of Kringen.
- 1613–1648: Qin Liangyu commands armies in China.
- 1614–1615: Kōzōsu helped defend the Toyotomi clan at the Siege of Osaka.
- 1624: The settler Maria Ortiz (1603–1646) famously participate in the defense of the Portuguese colony of Espírito Santo against the attempted Dutch invasion.
- 1625: Trintje Symons (or Trijntje Sijmons) serves in the Dutch army dressed as a man.
- 1625–1629: Anne Jans serves as sailor in the Dutch navy as Jan Janz.
- 1628: Glasmästare-Kerstin is hanged after it is discovered that she enlisted as a soldier in the Swedish army.
- 1628–1629: Maritgen Jans serves in the Dutch navy dressed as a man under the name David van Gorkum.
- 1628–1632: Barbara Pieters Adriaens serve in the Dutch army dressed as a man under the name Wilhelm Adriaens.
- June 5, 1639: Lady Ann Cunningham leads a mixed-sex cavalry troop in the Battle of Berwick.
- 1629: Two women are discovered after having served in the Dutch army dressed as men.
- 1630s–1647: Gao Guiying leads her army as a general in China.
- 1641: Elizabeth Dowdall successfully defends Kilfinny Castle during the Irish Rebellion.
- 1641: Hendrickgen Lamberts van der Schuyr served in the Dutch army dressed as a man.
- 1641: Vrouwthe Frans is discovered after having served in the Dutch army dressed as a man.
- 1643–1715: Several soldiers are reportedly discovered to be female in the French Royal Army during the reign of King Louis XIV.
- 1643–1644: Shen Yunying leads her own army in China.
- 1643: Lady Mary Bankes defends Corfe Castle from a siege in the English Civil War.
- 1643: Lady Brilliana Harley defends Brampton Castle during the English Civil War.
- 1643: Henrietta Maria of France returns to England from France, landing in Yorkshire and joining Royalist troops in the English Civil War.
- 1643: Lady Blanche Arundell defends Wardour Castle during the English Civil War.
- 1643: An unnamed woman uses the name Claus Bernsen to enlist in the Dutch navy.
- 1644: Charlotte Stanley, Countess of Derby defends Latham House from Parliamentarian Forces.
- 1645: Françoise-Marie Jacquelin defence the Fort la Tour during the Acadian Civil War.
- 1644: Hilleke Sell and Jenneke Everts served in the Dutch army dressed as men.

=== 1650–1699 ===
- Roughly mid to late 1600s: Pashtun poet Nazo Tokhi defends a fortress.
- 1652: Anne Marie Louise d'Orléans, Duchess of Montpensier, fires the cannons against the army of Turenne during the Fronde.
- 1652–1653: Anna Jans serves in the Dutch Navy as a man during the war against England.
- 1652–1653: Johanna/Jannetje Pieters serves in the Dutch Navy as a man, Jan Pietersse, during the war against England.
- 1652–1653: Adriana La Noy serves as sailor dressed as a man in the Dutch Navy.
- 1653: Aagt de Tamboer serves in the Dutch navy dressed as a man.
- 1653: Anna Alders serves in the Dutch navy dressed as a man.
- 1653: The Princess of Moldavia, Doamna Ecaterina Cercheza, defends the city of Suceava toward the Ottoman siege.
- 1659: Anne Holck leads the defense of the Danish island of Langeland after the death of her spouse against the Swedes during the Dano-Swedish War (1658–1660).
- 1659–1665: Willemtge Gerrits serves in the Dutch Marine as a man.
- 1663: Annetje Barents serves in the Dutch navy dressed as a man under the name Klaas Barents.
- 1665: Jacoba Jacobs serves in the Dutch Marine as Jacob Jacobs.
- 1666: Hendrick Albertsz in the Dutch navy is discovered to have been a female dressed as a male.
- 1667: Engeltje Dirx serves in the Dutch army dressed as a man.
- 1667: Jacoba Jacobs serves in the Dutch navy dressed as a man.
- 1670: Alena Arzamasskaia, a Russian female ataman rebel, commanded a detachment of about 600 men and participated in the capture of Temnikov while disguised as a man.
- 1672: Annetje Pieters serves in the Dutch navy dressed as a man; the same year, another unnamed female is discovered to have done the same.
- 1672: Margaretha Sandra, as well as several other women, participate in the defence of the Dutch city of Aardenburg against the French.
- 1673: Elisabeth Someruell is reputed to have served as Tobias Morello in the Spanish army.
- 1673: Isabella Clara Gelvinck serves in the Dutch army dressed as a male.
- 1673: An unnamed female serves in the Dutch army dressed as a male.
- 1674: An unnamed female serves in the Dutch army dressed as a male.
- 1674: Francijntje van Lint serves in the Dutch army dressed as a male.
- 1675: An unnamed female serves in the Dutch army dressed as a male.
- 1675: An unnamed female serves in the Dutch navy dressed as a male.
- 1676: Kong Sizhen succeeds her spouse as Chinese Imperial military commander of Guanxi during the rebellion of Wu Sangui.
- 1676–1691: Geneviève Prémoy serves in the French army dressed as a male.
- 1677–1689: Reign of Keladi Chennamma. During her reign of 12 years, she repelled the advances of the Mughal Army led by Aurangzeb from her military base in the kingdom of Keladi located in Sagara, Karnataka India.
- 1677: An unnamed female serves in the Dutch navy dressed as a male.
- 1679: Lisbetha Olsdotter is put on trial for having served in the Swedish army under the name Mats Ersson.
- 1684: Catharina Rosenbrock serves in the Dutch army as well as the navy dressed as a male.
- 1685–1688: Ilona Zrínyi defends the Palanok Castle in Munkács against the Habsburg forces.
- 1688: Maria Jacoba de Turenne serves in the Dutch army dressed as a man
- 1690s: Kit Cavanagh disguises herself as a man in order to fight as a dragoon.
- 1690: Anne Chamberlyne, a female tar who disguised herself as a man, fights the French at Beachy Head.
- 1691: Anna Isabella Gonzaga, Duchess of Mantua, defends Mantua against the Spanish as regent during the absence of her spouse.
- 1691–1696: Marie Magdelaine Mouron serves in the French army dressed as a male.
- 1692: Philis de La Charce, led a peasant army to help vanquish invading forces in the Dauphiné region.
- 1694: An unnamed female serves in the Dutch navy dressed as a male.
- 1696: Joonas Dirckse in the Dutch navy is discovered to be a female dressed as a male.
- 1696: Mongolian Queen Anu dies saving her husband at the Battle of Zuunmod.
- Late 17th century: A Finnish female serves in the French, English and Danish armies dressed as a male.
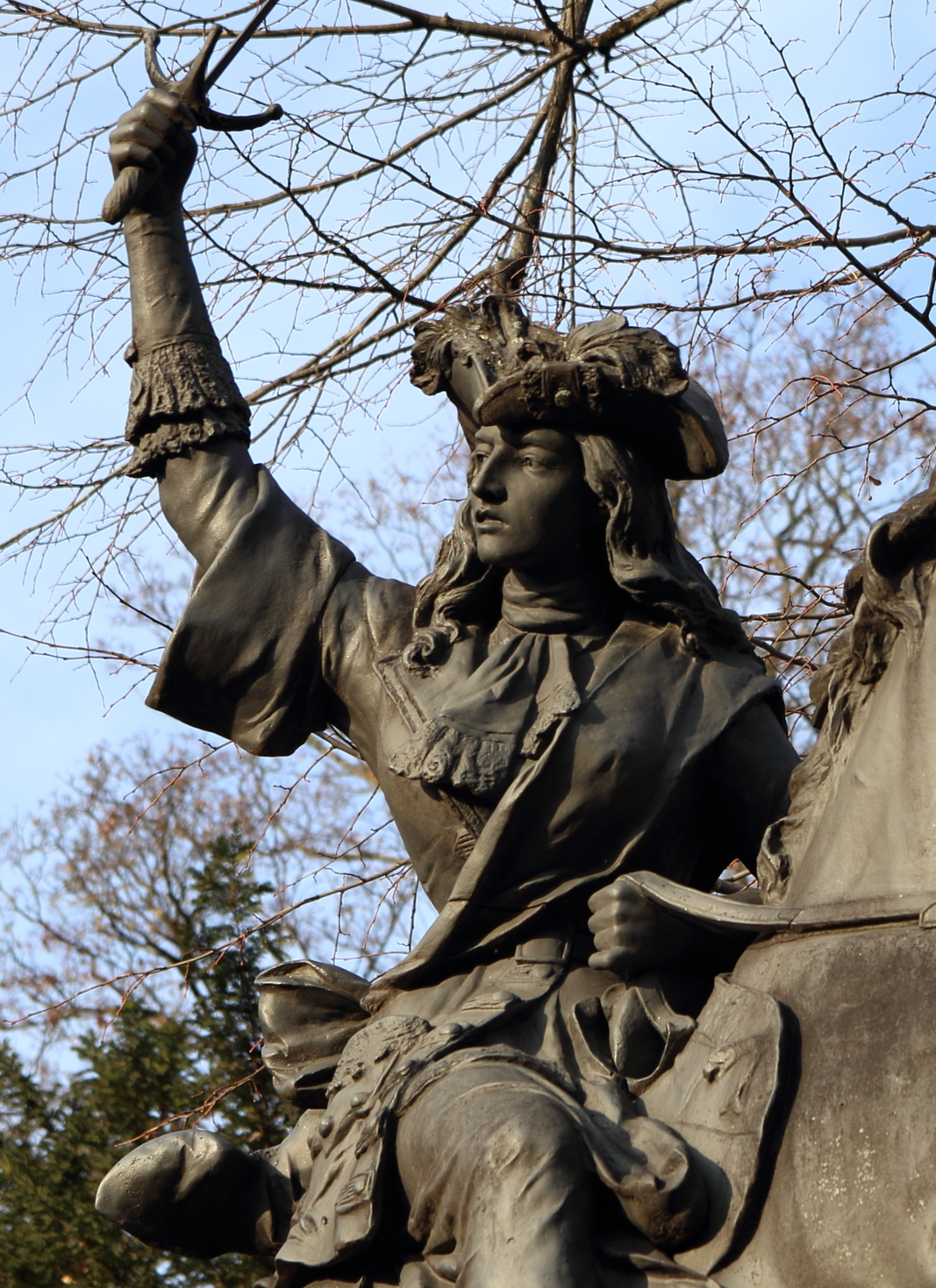
  Philis de La Charce

== See also ==
- Women in 18th-century warfare
