= Mayo Suzukaze =

Japanese actress

- 涼風 真世
- Born: Kaname Morinaga; September 11, 1960 (age 65); Ishinomaki, Miyagi Prefecture, Japan
- Other name: Kaname (かなめ)
- Occupation: Actress
- Years active: 1981–present
- Notable work: Himura Kenshin (Rurouni Kenshin)
- Height: 1.63 m (5 ft 4 in)
- Spouse: Kiyoshi Imazumi (2004-present)
- Website: ameblo.jp/suzukaze-mayo/

Kaname Morinaga (森永佳奈女, Morinaga Kaname; born September 11, 1960), known by her stage name Mayo Suzukaze (涼風真世, Suzukaze Mayo) is a Japanese actress and voice actress from Ishinomaki in Miyagi Prefecture. Suzukaze has also done some voice work as a voice actress, namely as the voice of Himura Kenshin in Rurouni Kenshin. She was previously a Takarazuka Revue stage actress and the Top Star of Moon Troupe. Her best-known Takarazuka role was that of Oscar François de Jarjayes in the 1991 Moon Troupe production of The Rose of Versailles.

== Personal life ==
In 2004, Suzukaze announced her marriage to former Japan rugby union international and, at the time, coach of the rugby team of Waseda University Kiyoshi Imazumi.

== Filmography ==
=== Television ===
Year	Title	Role	Notes
1994	Oda Nobunaga	Lady Noh	
1995	Uogashi no Princess	Mayumi Kusaka	The title part
1996	Taiga drama Hideyoshi	Otaki (Ishikawa Goemon's wife)	
1999	Taiga drama Genroku Ryōran	Nobuko Takatsukasa	
2002	Taiga drama Toshiie to Matsu	Kōzōsu	
2005	Aibou 4	A principal of the school	ep 14
2005	Mei bugyo! Ōoka Echizen no kami	Orin (a secret agent)	The sequel was broadcast in 2006.
2008	Taiga drama Atsuhime	Oyura	

=== Television animation ===
- Jungle Taitei Susume Leo as Guest
- Le Chevalier D'Eon as Mary Shalott
- Rurouni Kenshin as Himura Kenshin
- The Snow Queen as Snow Queen

=== Theatre ===
Title	Role	Duration in production
Carousel	Julie Jordan	May 1995 – July 1996
She Loves Me	Amalia Balash	December 1995 – November 1998
42nd Street	Peggy Sawyer	December 1997 – April 1999
Me and My Girl	Lady Jaqueline Carstone	March 2003
The Witches of Eastwick	Jane Smart	December 2003
Mozart!	Baroness von Waldstätten	June – November 2005
Marie Antoinette	Marie Antoinette	November – December 2006
Elisabeth	Elisabeth (share role with Hikaru Asami)	August 2008 – February 2009
Me and My Girl	Maria, Duchess of Dene	June – July 2009

=== Dubbing ===
- The Replacement Killers, Meg Coburn (Mira Sorvino)
