= Margaretha Sandra =

Dutch heroine (1629–1674)

- Born: 7 January 1629; Middelburg, Zeeland
- Died: 21 June 1674 (aged 45); Aardenburg, Zeeuws-Vlaanderen
- Occupation: Heroine
- Known for: Defending Aardenburg
- Spouse(s): 1) Jan Fraudenius 2) Jan Pz. puijs 3) Pieter Roman

Margaretha Sandra (7 January 1629 in Middelburg – 21 June 1674 in Aardenburg, Zeeland), was a Dutch heroine, known for her participation in the defense of Aardenburg during the two-night siege by the French in 1672.

== Life ==
Margaretha grew up in Middelburg and Sluis, as the eldest daughter in a family with nine children. By 1672, she had been widowed twice and had married for the third time to Pieter Roman. They were living in Aardenburg, Netherlands.

=== Battle ===
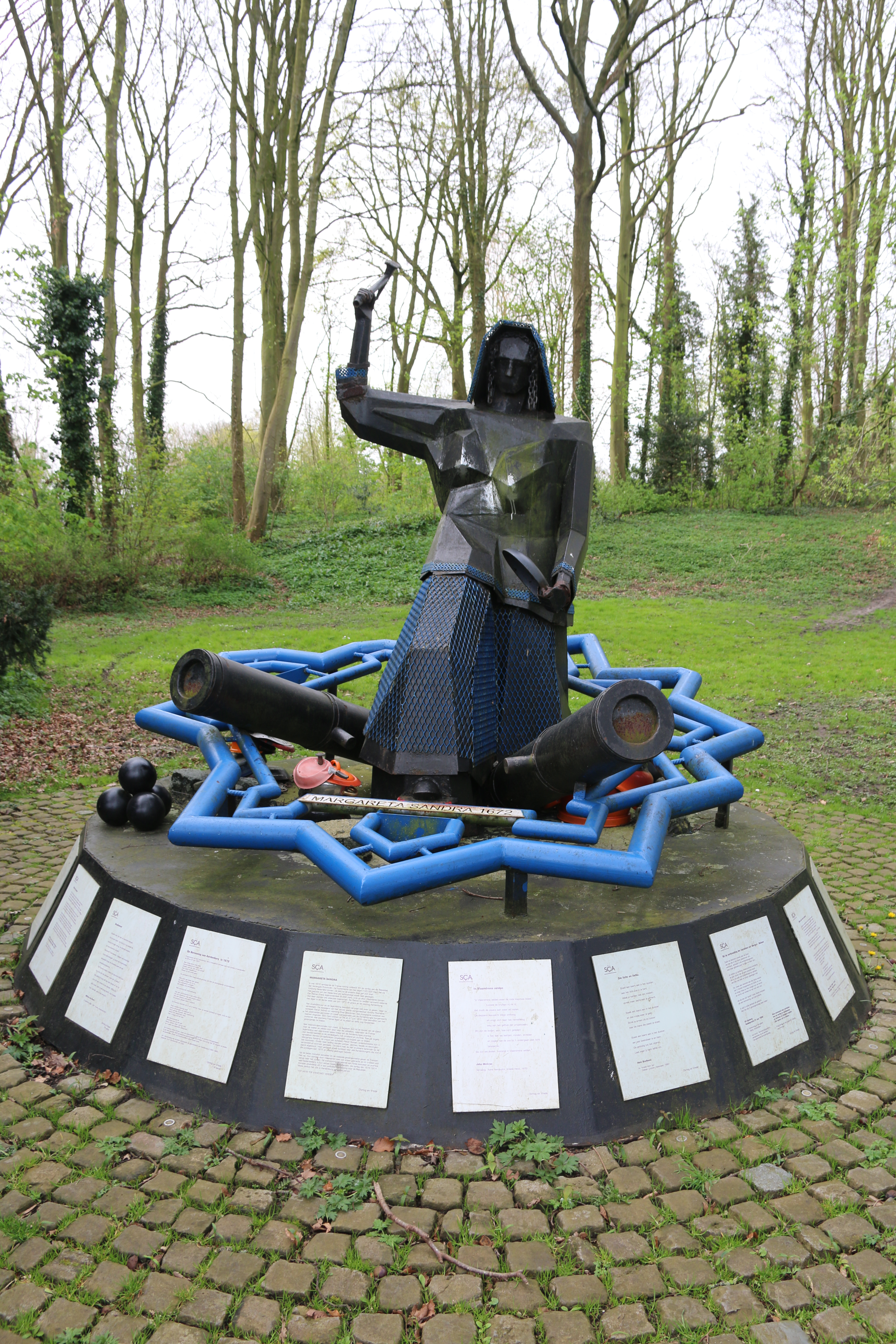
Statue of Margaretha Sandra in Aardenburg

During the weekend of 25 and 26 June 1672, a French invasion force totaling more than 5,000 men attacked the neglected fortress town of Aardenburg, which had only 186 civilians and 40 soldiers to defend it. During the two nights of the attack, the outnumbered soldiers were joined in battle by women who wore men's hats as they carried ammunition to the troops stationed on the city walls, thus giving the enemy the impression that the besieged city held many more men than was actually the case.

When the French troops attacked the second night, the defenders were joined by about 160 soldiers and boatswains from nearby Cadzand and Sluis. Together they vanquished the French having killed hundreds of attackers and capturing hundreds more. Not a single person was killed on the defenders' side.

Sandra is said to have crafted ammunition during the battle and has been singled out as a representative for all the women who took part in the city's defense.

=== A controversial reputation ===
Margaretha Sandra's name was not specifically mentioned in descriptions of the battle at that time, which has led to some controversy over her role as heroine. However, according to Kloek, Sandra's legend may have merit.

Indeed, the documents about the siege—mostly eyewitness letters, printed extracts of which were distributed immediately in 1672—make no mention of Margaretha Sandra. However, almost all of them report on the women's participation in the struggle... It is possible that Margaretha Sandra's name has been mentioned in one of these letters, but has not been included in the extract that appeared in print.

Sandra died two years after the battle and had no children.
