= Kiyoshi Imazumi =

Japan international rugby union player

- Born: September 13, 1967 (age 59) Setagaya Ward, Tokyo, Japan
- School: Kumagaya High School
- University: Waseda University

Rugby union career
- Position: Fullback
Amateur team(s)
Years	Team	Apps	(Points)
1984-1987	Maitsuru High School		
1987-1994	Waseda University RFC		
Senior career
Years	Team	Apps	(Points)
1995-2001	Suntory		
International career
Years	Team	Apps	(Points)
1988-1998	Japan	8	(21)
Coaching career
- Years: Team
- 2000: Waseda University
- 2001-2005: Suntory Foods Sundelphis

Kiyoshi Imazumi (今泉清, Imazumi Kiyoshi) (born 13 September 1967) is a Japanese former rugby union player. He played as fullback.

== Career ==
Born in Setagaya Ward, Tokyo. In 1971, Imazumi moved to Oita Prefecture and started to play rugby at the age of six. At Maizuru High School, entering through Ichinami, Makoto Hida at the second grade (who later served captain at Meiji University and active at Kobe Steel) and he missed participation in the National High School Championship (At the end of 2015, Maizuru could not play at Hanazono) after the defeat against Oita Fishery High School. He also plays as number 8 and as flanker. After attending Waseda University, he was converted to wing by Kenji Kimoto, then switched to fullback, while active as a player for Waseda. When he kicked a goal kick, the stand shouts "1, 2, 3, 4, 5!", keeping with the pace of going backwards one and two steps slowly, which was the air that envelopes the whole stadium. Originally, it was the correct manner to keep the quiet the place during the penalty kick, but it was different for Imazumi. It was originally during a fiery competition, when the opponent fans attempted to disrupt his concentration, but it became a chant dedicated to Imazumi. After that, similar chants almost not seen. In the 4th grade, kicking a drop lessened, but during the penalty kick near the halfway line during the University Championship semi-finals against Doshisha University, when Imazumi stood at the kicking pont, the clapping took off from the whole audience, followed by the "1, 2, 3, 4, 5!" chant, shaking the nation. Imazumi kicked a splendid penalty kick and got the best cheers on that day. He showed a big play that no one anticipated on the big stage, such as a miraculous try leading to the same score from the last 12 points in the 1990 match against Meiji. In his four years studying in the university, Imazumi won the University Championship twice and won the Japanese Championship once. From the late 1980s to the early 1990s, he was a player deserving to be called a "senior boss" who contributed greatly to the popularity of Japanese rugby. It was hard to be difficult to understand, while he did not know what to do, on the other hand, although he did not play for the Japanese national team, his talent was highly appreciated by Onishi Tetsunosuke. After graduating from university and studying abroad in New Zealand, Imazumi joined Suntory in 1994. The following year, he was called up in Japanese National team for the 1995 Rugby World Cup in South Africa, He also played for Japan sevens. In the 1995 Rugby World Cup, played in South Africa, he did not see action during the tournament. The leaders, who were interested in golf, criticized the disturbance in the management when Imazumi was appointed as backs coach for Amway. After the 2000 Japanese championship season, he retired, becoming, being appointed as coach for his alma mater, Waseda University RFC. In addition, he moved to subsidiary Suntoryfoods Sundelphis and assumed office as playing coach. In March 2005, Imazumi left Sundelphis (remaining the head coach in the rugby club) and went to Graduate School of Public Management at Waseda University. He is also a commentator at J Sports sports TV channel.

== Personal life ==
In 2004, Imazumi married the actress Mayo Suzukaze.

== TV ==
- Inochi no Hibiki - TBS documentary show. He appeared in the first 102 episodes of the 1997 broadcast.
