= Frans Dieleman =

Dutch geographer

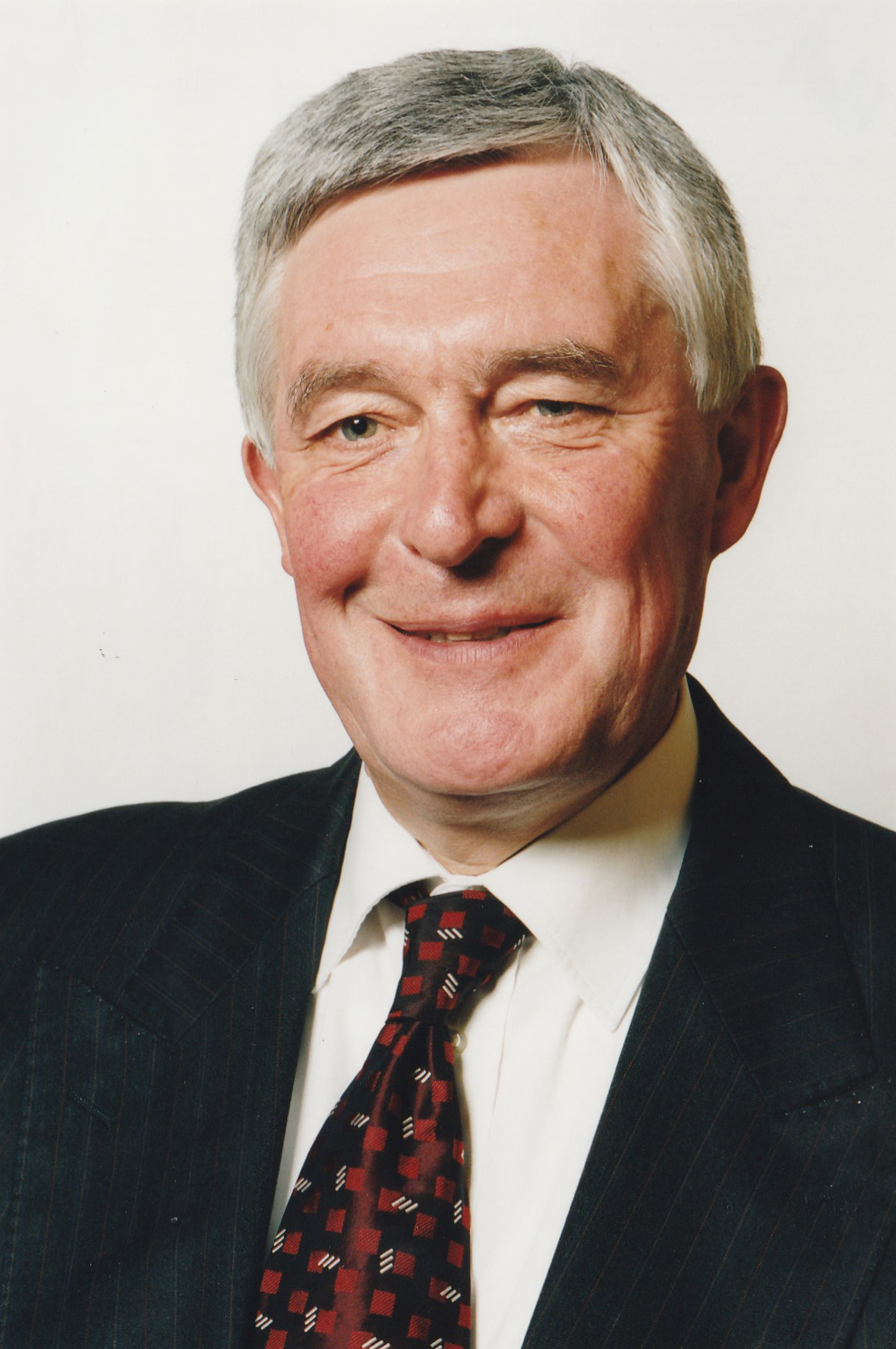
Frans Dieleman (2001).

François Marinus (Frans) Dieleman (2 September 1942 in Aardenburg – 11 April 2005) was a Dutch geographer and Professor in Urban and Rural Geography at the Utrecht University known for his work in the fields of urban geography and the geography of housing.

== Life and work ==
After studying social geography at the VU University Amsterdam in Amsterdam, where he graduated with honors, Dieleman continued his doctoral study at the University of Wisconsin. In 1978 he graduated from the university with a thesis entitled ""Een analyse van spreidingspatronen van vestigingen en van werkgelegenheidsgebieden in Tilburg en Eindhoven: een methodisch-technische studie" (An analysis of distribution patterns of branches and employment areas in Tilburg and Eindhoven: a methodical-technical study).

Dieleman's started his academic career in 1969 at the VU University Amsterdam in the Department of Urban and Rural Geography of Western countries, which was part of the Geographic and Planning Institute of the Vrije Universiteit of Amsterdam. Sequentially from 1981 to 2003 he was a professor in Urban and Rural Geography at the Faculty of Geosciences, Utrecht University. The last two years of his live he worked as Professor of Methods, Techniques and System Innovation in Spatial Planning at Delft University of Technology.

Late 1980s Dieleman and Hugo Priemus initiated the Netherlands Graduate School for Housing and Urban Research (NETHUR) in which the universities of Utrecht, Delft and Amsterdam worked together. In 1994 it acquired the official recognition of the Royal Netherlands Academy of Arts and Sciences. Dieleman directed NETHUR until 1998. Later in Delft he was also affiliated with the Institute for Spatial Research.

== Work ==
According to William A. V. Clark (2004) Dieleman played a prominent role in the geographer community in The Netherlands. Clark summarized:

His research contributions are inextricably bound up with our work on housing and residential mobility, and in association with Rinus Deurloo he made major contributions to how we think about neighborhoods, and communities, and our progress through these neighborhoods. He was a stimulating and unflagging research contributor and our joint work - Households and Housing: Choices and Outcomes in the Housing Market - is a summary of much of his thinking about housing and residential mobility.

And furthermore:

His contributions to both theoretical and policy issues in housing were presented at the biannual meetings of the European Network of Housing Research. In fact he was one of the founding figures in the Network and worked with colleagues in The Netherlands, Sweden, the United Kingdom, and the new Eastern European academic groups to further the outreach of the Housing Network and its contributions both in theory and in more applied settings.

== Selected publications ==
- Clark, William AV, and Frans M. Dieleman. Households and housing: Choice and outcomes in the housing market. Transaction Publishers, 1996.

Articles, a selection:

- Dieleman, Frans M. "Modelling residential mobility; a review of recent trends in research." Journal of housing and the built environment 16.3-4 (2001): 249–265.
- Clapham, David. "Housing pathways: A post modern analytical framework." Housing, theory and society 19.2 (2002): 57–68.
- Dieleman, Frans M., and Clara H. Mulder. "The geography of residential choice." in: Residential environments: choice, satisfaction, and behavior, J.I. Aragonés, G. Francescato, T. Gärling (eds.) (2002): 35–54.
- Dieleman, Frans M., Martin Dijst, and Guillaume Burghouwt. "Urban form and travel behaviour: micro-level household attributes and residential context." Urban Studies 39.3 (2002): 507–527.
- Van Dam, Frank, Saskia Heins, and Berien S. Elbersen. "Lay discourses of the rural and stated and revealed preferences for rural living. Some evidence of the existence of a rural idyll in the Netherlands." Journal of Rural Studies 18.4 (2002): 461–476.
