= Wa Shi =

Zhuang warrior, general and politician

Wa Shi 瓦氏夫人
- Born: 1498
- Died: 1560 (aged 61–62)
- Occupation(s): General, martial artist
- Children: Cen Bangzuo

Wa Shi (1498–1560), was a Zhuang noblewoman, who was a warrior, general, and political figure in southern China in the latter years of the Ming Dynasty, who is best known for countering the wokou pirates along China's southeastern coast during the reign of the Jiajing Emperor.

== Life ==
Wa Shi's father was nobleman Cen Zhang, a powerful lord of the Cen clan. She was a member of the minority Zhuang people from southern China, many of whose women trained as warriors. Her husband was the Zhuang noblemen Cen Meng, a Tusi (or chieftain) with whom she had a son, Cen Bangzuo. In the period 1524-1527 Cen Meng broke with the Chinese ruling dynasty. Because his rebellion endangered all of the Zhuang lords, Wa Shi's father, Cen Zhang, had Cen Meng poisoned. After Cen Meng's death, Wa Shi exploited the power vacuum to manoeuvre herself into a position of power, eventually becoming one of the most powerful lords in the Zhuang heartlands. Under the Jiajing Emperor, Wa Shi participated in the government of Tianzhou in the Guangxi region of China.

In 1553, the wokou pirates intensified their raids on the southeastern coast of China. In 1555, the emperor appointed Wa Shi as regional commander to assist general Yu Dayou in suppressing the pirates. In March 1555, Wa Shi led troops to cross several thousand li (Chinese miles) from Tianzhou to defend Jinshanwei (modern Shanghai), and rescued a Marshal of the Ming Dynasty from an enemy ambush. Wa Shi also had a victory at Shengun (‘Flourishing Mound’) in Suzhou, which was commemorated by changing its name to ‘Victorious Mound’. In 1557 Wa Shi was chosen as a general to act against the wokou pirates who plaguing the southeast Chinese coast. She led over 6000 Zhuang infantry against the pirates and successfully defeated them at Wangjiangjing (north of modern Jiaxing). As a consequence, the emperor ennobled Wa Shi and granted her the title of ‘Lady of Premier Rank’ (一品夫人; yi pin fu ren).

Wa Shi died in 1560 and was buried in the Guangxi region.
