= Assault on Aardenburg (1672) =

- Part of the Franco-Dutch War
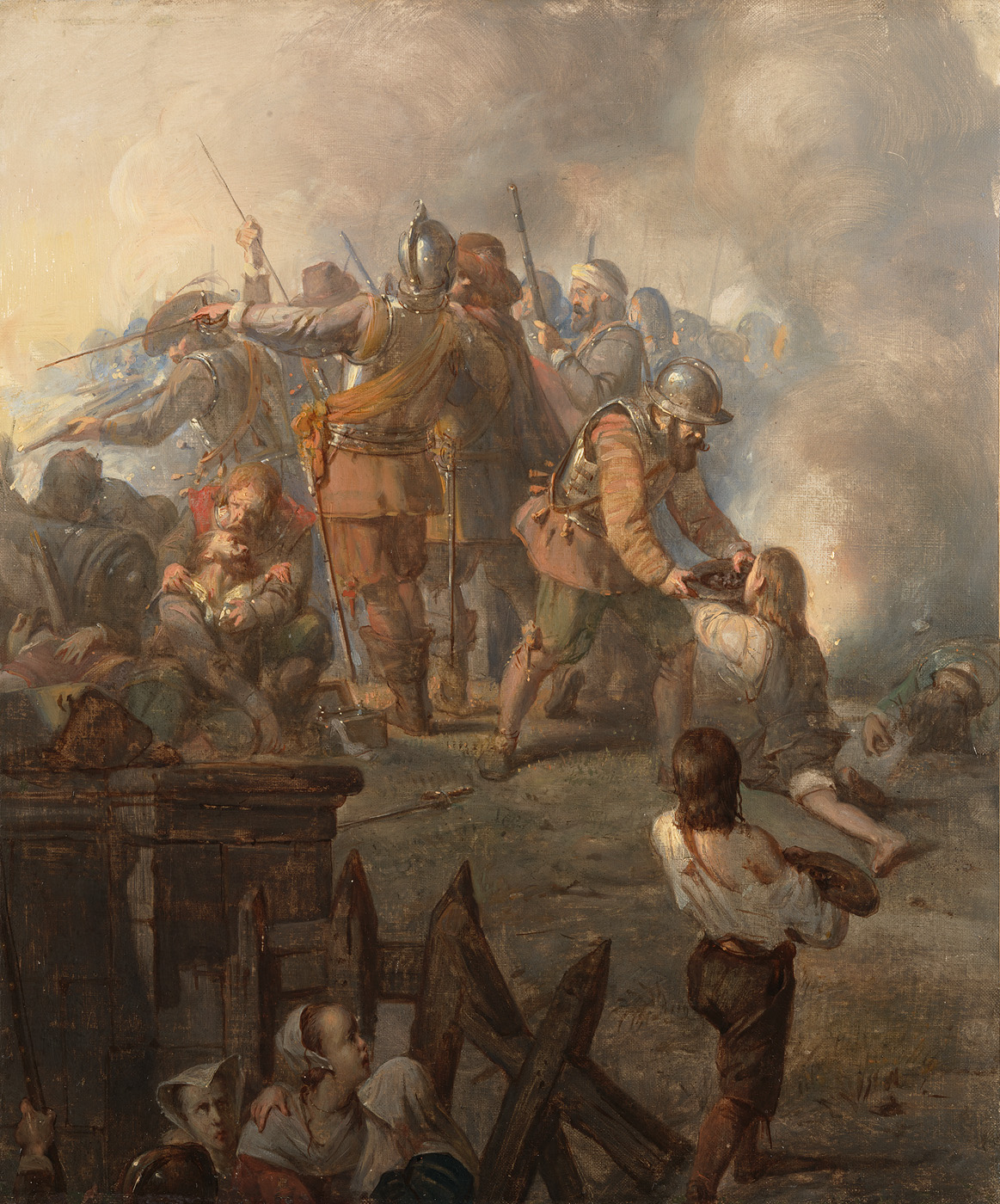
- The heroic defence of Aardenburg, by Barend Wijnveld
Date	June 25–27, 1672
Location	Aardenburg, Dutch Republic
Result	Dutch victory

Belligerents
France	Dutch Republic

Commanders and leaders
(Kingdom of France) Claude Antoine de Dreux (Kingdom of France) de Dreux-Nancré	(Dutch Republic) Elias Beeckman (Dutch Republic) Colonel Albert Spindler

Strength
5,000–9,000 men	165–198 soldiers 50–165 armed civilians

Casualties and losses
500–1,500 killed or wounded 500–620 prisoners	2–6 wounded

The Assault on Aardenburg took place between June 25–26 when a French force of 5,000–9,000 men, under de Nancré, tried to take the fortress town of Aardenburg. Its small garrison however held out and managed to repulse the assault.

== Background ==
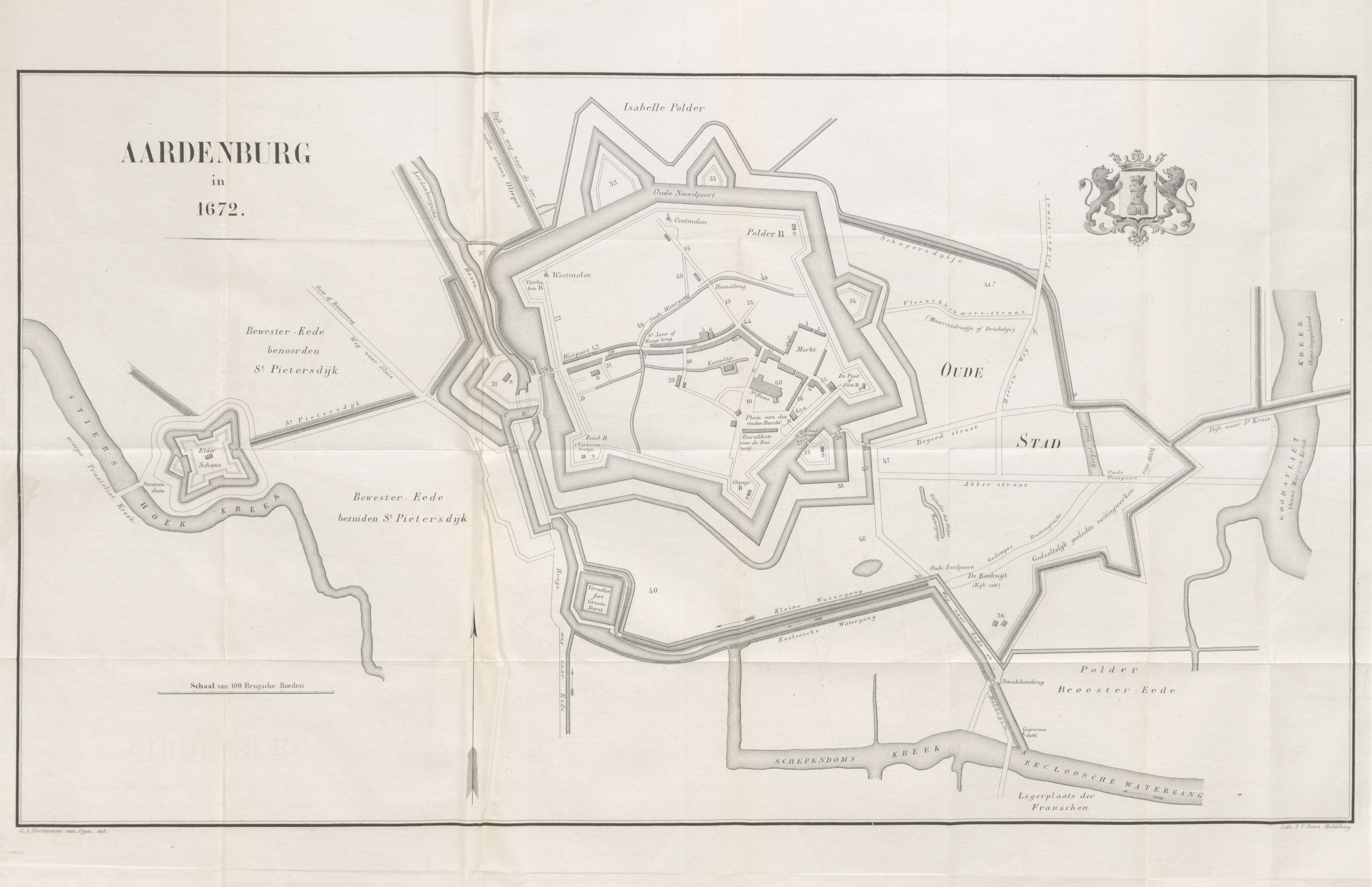
Detailed image of Aardenburg in 1672

On 1 April 1672 the inhabitants of Aardenburg got word that the fortress had to be dismantled. On the 18th of April it even had no defences, and all the banners would leave, but the commander would stay with 25 soldiers. With the outbreak of the Franco-Dutch War the French where taking over several Dutch Territories. Aardenburg was next. The commander of the fort left for The Hague trying to get reinforcements. The entire population of Aardenburg would have been around 50 at that time. On June 25 the French already reached Deinze. Aardenburg was in danger, and wanted to evacuate its citizens. In the evening they got word that the French left Deinze and were on the way to Aardenburg. The citizens worked together to prepare for the French invasion. They made bullets, melted lead, made loading powder, made scrap from old iron then crafted it into ramparts and even stones were taken to the walls for defence.

== Assault ==
In the Middle of the night the French have arrived in Smedekensbrugge, where the assault began the fortress resisted bravely, while waiting for the reinforcements from Sluis the French remained close but would undoubtedly try again. A French soldier came and asked for the fort to surrender, and was chased away. While this was happening the French took some citizens in the fields hostage. The Dutch shot from the fort at the camp. The French then fled and a few got captured, and the hostages where relieved. The canal got pierced, and more French soldiers where on the way to Aardenburg while the Dutch fought back hard shooting and trowing rocks, doing everything they could to resist French invasion, The woman dressed up as man and also fought, even the children where helping.

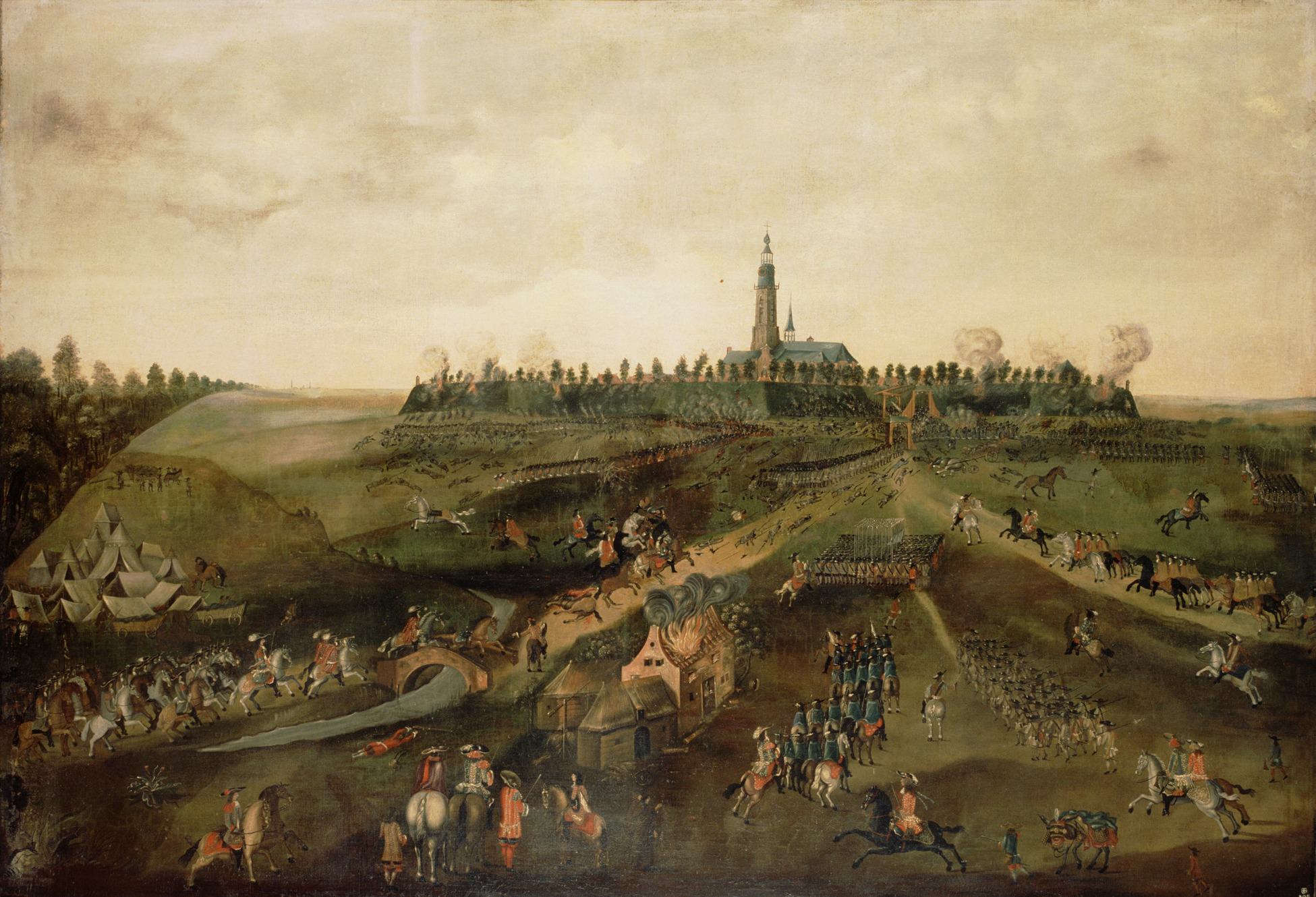
The French in the assault on Aardenburg

The magistrates were thinking of a possible surrender because they were so greatly outnumbered, however Beeckman refused to give up. The mayor made a new request for reinforcements. At around 7 pm, 40 more troops arrived from the town of Sluis. The children and woman could finally be evacuated. But the French still had great numbers of around 8000–9000, in the night the French tried again, but were unsuccessful.

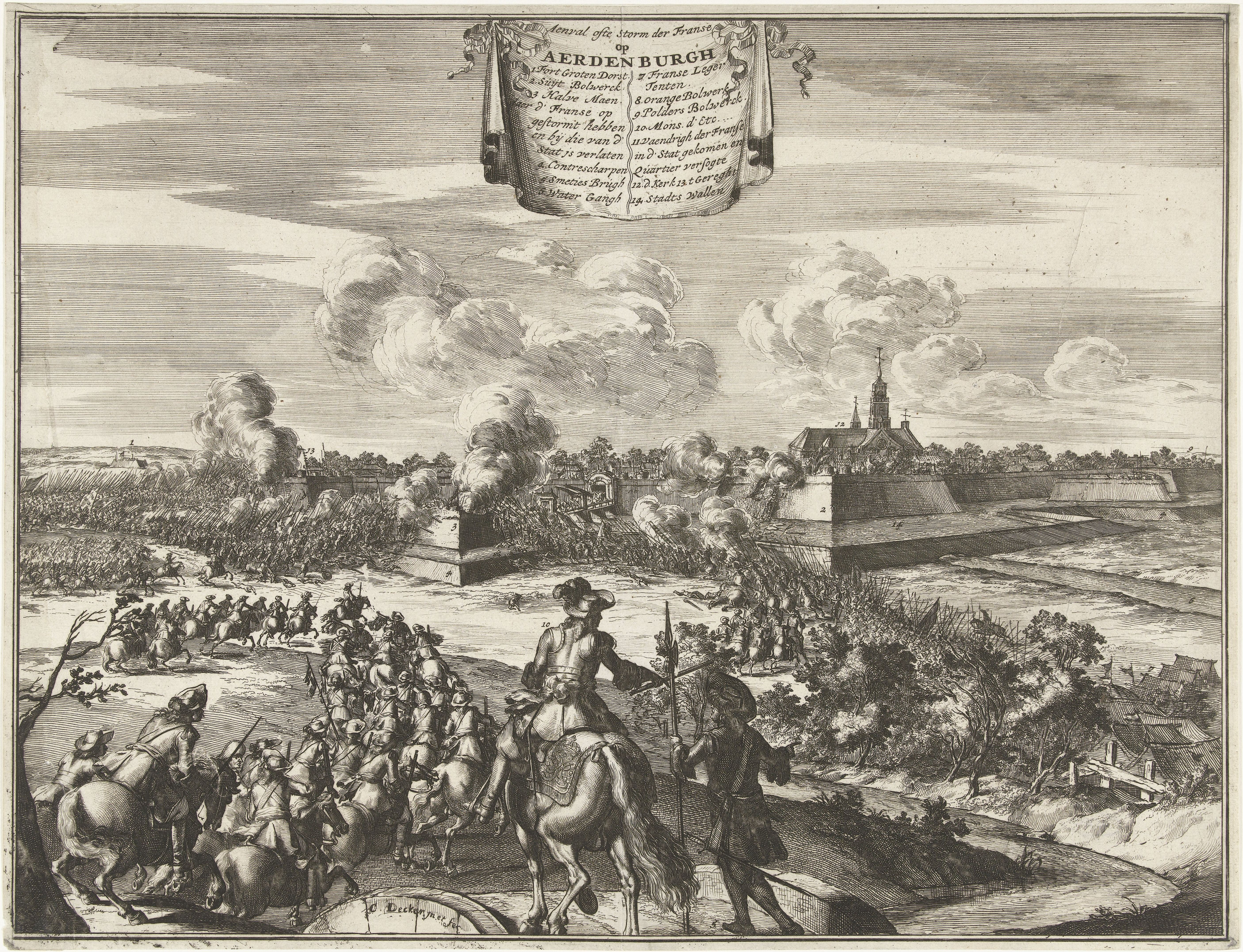
Commander watching the assault on Aardenburg from a hill

Help of 110 soldiers, led by Colonel Spindler from Sluis, approached the Waterpoort, while one group of the French soldiers initiated an attack on the outer barrier, shouting, "Forward with courage! Kill, kill them to death, death to the Dutch scum!" while the defenders screamed "French dogs, keep up your courage, but be careful not to hit anything!" Subsequently, the French forces lowered the drawbridge and opened the double inner gate, believing victory was within their grasp. They chanted, "City captured! Forward, cavalry! Kill, kill them all to death, no mercy!" Then attacked two strongholds of the city. The Defenders drove away the French from the outer crescent. The captured French soldiers were begging for mercy while locked up in the Church. 1 French soldier escaped and told another army about the Prisoners. on June 27 the French officially withdrew.

== Sources ==
- Van der Aa, Abraham Jacob (1854). "Elias Beeckman". Biographisch woordenboek der Nederlanden. Deel 2 (in Dutch). p. 240.
- van Damme, Harold. "Franse aanval op de stad Aardenburg d.d. 26 en 27 juni 1672" (in Dutch).
- Knoop, Willem Jan (1862). Krijgs – en geschiedkundige geschriften. Deel 2 [Martial and historical writings. Volume 2] (in Dutch). H. A. M. Roelants.
- Oijen, G (1872). De berenning van Aardenburg in 1672 verzameling van uit- en onuitgegeven stukken aangaande de geschiedenis van Aardenburg, van 1660-1680 · Volume 1 (in Dutch). Van Nooten.
