= Shen Yunying =

Chinese military general (1624–1660)

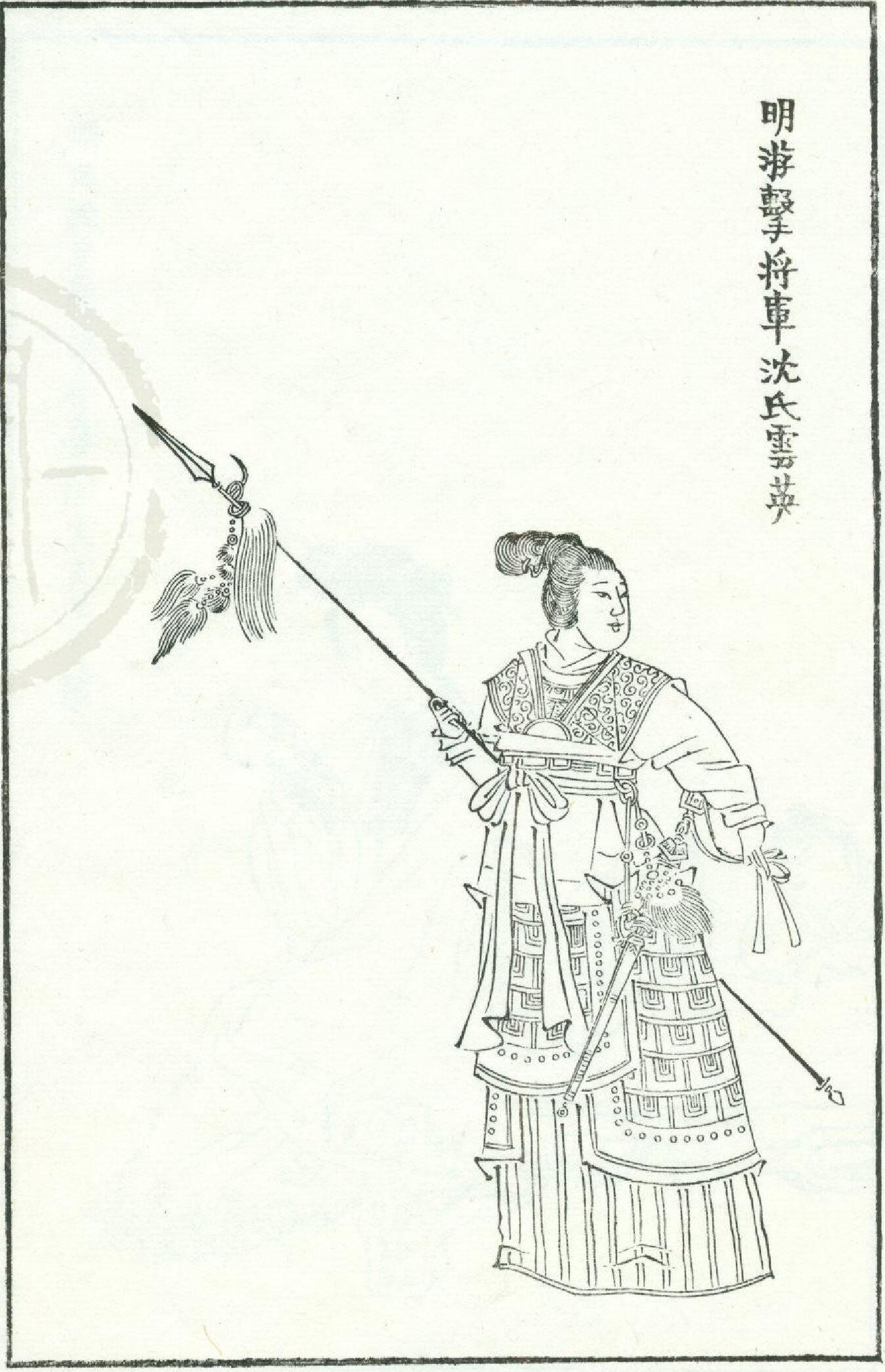
Shen Shiyunying, a guerrilla general in the Ming Dynasty, in the second volume of the portrait of Yu Yuexian, written by Wang Ling in the Qing Dynasty, the portrait of the bear in the Qing Dynasty, Xianfeng engraved in the Qing Dynasty

Shen Yunying (simplified Chinese: 沈云英; traditional Chinese: 沈雲英; 1624–1660), also known as Shen Guandi (沈官弟), was a Chinese female military general in the imperial army of the Ming dynasty in 17th century China.

== Life ==
Shen Yunying was the daughter of General Shen Zhixu, who was in command of the garrison at Daozhou, in modern-day Hunan. She accompanied her father on his missions, and she was married to a man of the army.

In 1643, her father was killed in battle against the rebel army of Zhang Xianzhong. Shen Yunying took command after his death, and managed to both defend the city and retrieve her father's body. In a move that was highly unusual for the time, the court formally appointed her to be her father's successor.

She displayed great military skill in her fight to protect the Ming dynasty from the armies of both the Manchu Qing dynasty and Gao Guiying, the other great female commander of the time, on whose opposite side she was, but she could not prevent the capture of Beijing in 1644 and the death of the last Ming emperor. When her husband Jia Jian was himself killed in battle at Jingzhou, she resigned her post and withdrew to private life. She founded a school where she educated girls in both academics and the martial arts.

Shen Yunying died in 1660.

== In literature ==
Shen's life story was retold in a number of works of literature. Dong Rong (d. 1760) published a play about Shen Yuying and another notable female military figure, Qin Liangyu. In the nineteenth century, Zhang Chaixin celebrated Shen Yunying's heroic deeds in the poem "The Ballad of General Shen", which depicts her as a powerful warrior and filial daughter, as well as a gifted writer, despite none of her writings surviving. In the twentieth century, Cheng Yanqiu, one of the four great performers of the dan role in Peking opera, also wrote an opera about Shen Yunying.
