= Gao Guiying =

Chinese rebel leader (died 1647)

Lady of the First degree Gao Guiying 高桂英
- Died: 1647
- Occupation: Military commander

Gao Guiying (Chinese: 高桂英) (died 1647) was a female Chinese rebellion leader and military commander of the short-lived Shun dynasty. She was the empress of the Shun founding emperor Li Zicheng.

== Life ==
From the beginning of the 17th century, the Ming dynasty of China was decaying during a large number of rebellions, the greatest one being the rebellion of Li Zicheng, who gathered a very large army of followers around him and became more successful every year.

It is said that Li met Gao while hiding in the house of her father, and when he left, she went with him and took an active part in the rebellion, following him side by side at the head of his army, sharing his command. While Li was the commander of the male troops, Gao educated, trained and lead the female troops of rebels.

The rebellion was so successful that the armies of Li and Gao effectively controlled large parts of China and ruled them as independent entities. This caused the Ming dynasty to fall to pieces, as it was at the same time attacked by the Qing dynasty.

In 1644, Li Zicheng captured Beijing, deposed the Ming dynasty and declared himself the emperor of a new dynasty, Shun. Accordingly, Gao became the empress and took control over the city as his regent, but soon after, the Qing dynasty took Beijing and extended its rule into China proper. Li was killed in 1645.

Gao now saw the Qing as her new enemies, and switched her allegiance to her former enemies: the remnants of the Ming ruling family had formed a new court in the southern China and ruled as the Southern Ming dynasty, and Gao, making herself known as the greatest enemy of the Qing dynasty, was called there to serve and continue the fight against the foreign intruders. She was styled "Lady of the first degree" in her own right, her position as military commander was secured and she was declared protector of the new Ming dynasty. Gao led the fight against the Qing dynasty until her death in 1647.

Gao Guiying is undoubtedly one of the most unusual and interesting characters in Chinese history, especially considering the time she lived; there have been a large number of women in her position earlier on in Chinese history, but in the 12th century, women's position in China diminished severely, and the only other women of her time to have a similar position were Shen Yunying and Qin Liangyu.
