= Marguerite Delaye =

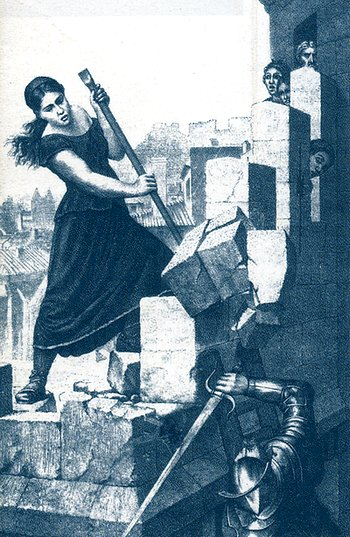
Marguerite Catherine Ponsoye alias Margot Delaye, by Grellet

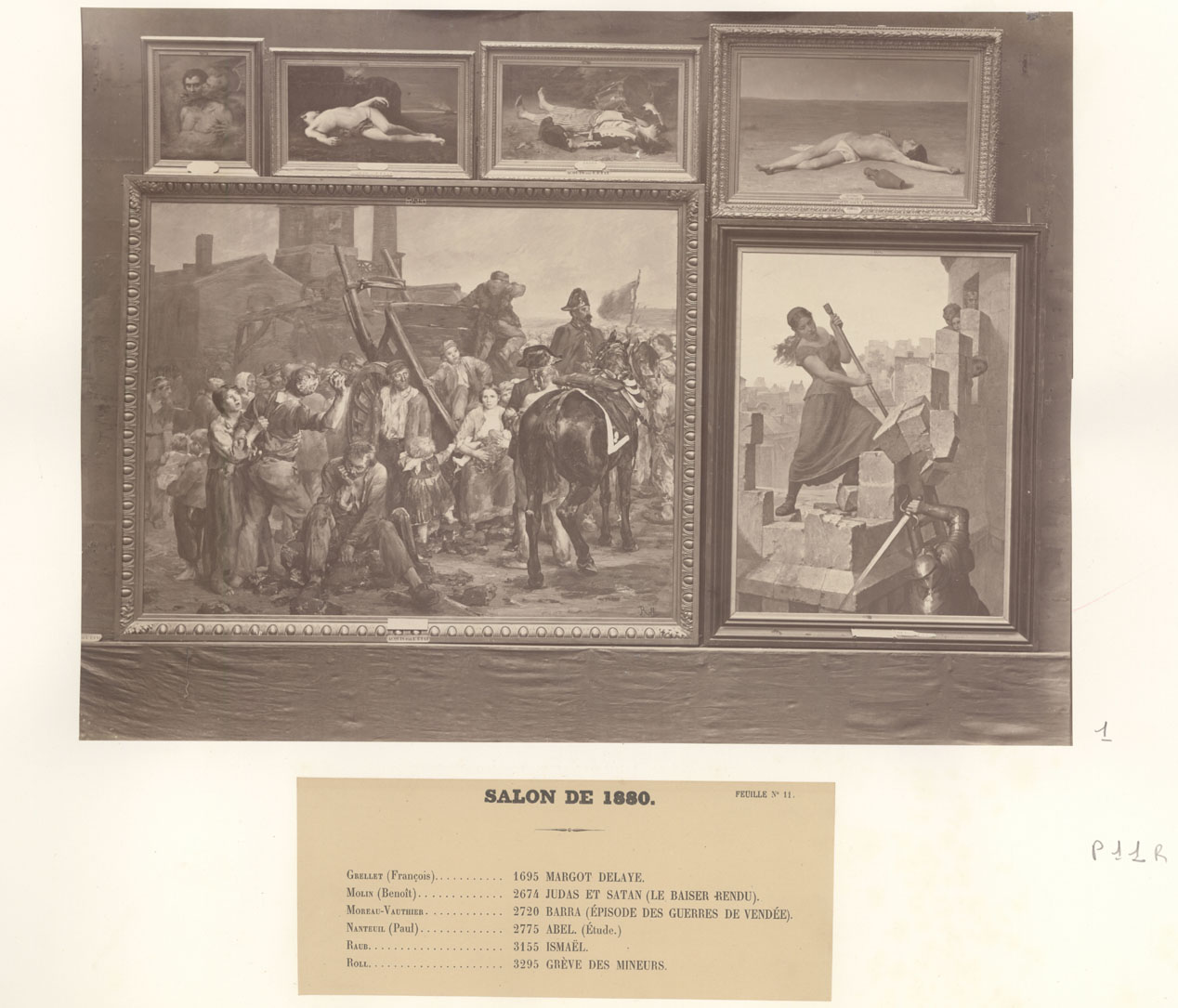
Margot Delaye, by François Grellet, Salon of 1880

During the French Wars of Religion, Marguerite Catherine Ponsoye Delaye, also known as Margot Delaye or La Gandonne, was a woman who fought during the siege of Montelimar by Admiral Coligny in April 1570, during which she lost an arm. This battle was part of the French Wars of Religion. A one-armed statue was erected in her honor.

== History ==
In April 1570, part of the Protestant army commanded by the admiral Gaspard II de Coligny and Ludovic of Nassau arrived at the gates of the town of Montélimar, which was controlled by the Catholics. It was during one of the assaults that the legend of Margot Delaye was born. The soldiers, who were short of ammunition, received reinforcements from the inhabitants, among them some women, including Margot Delaye. The latter went to battle on the rampart wall, and, short of arms, threw down all that was available, mainly various utensils and stones. She lost her right hand or arm in a fight with Ludovic of Nassau, whom she knocked out with a heavy cast-iron pot. Legend has it that it killed him, but he in fact died in 1574. The consuls of the town repaid Margot Delaye for her heroic acts with housing, bread and wine.

The origins and true history of Margot Delaye are poorly documented. She seems to belong to the Ponsoye family, more specifically the Bourg-Saint-Andéol branch, and is likely family of Pastor Edmond Ponsoye and his brother Dr. Charles Ponsoye, an historian. She was said to be a modest washerwoman and possibly betrothed or married to a knight who had likely died in battle. Gossip of the time also suggests that she was the illegitimate child of Pierre de Poitiers, lord of Laye.

The town of Montélimar has named one of its streets after her.

== Depictions in art ==
A 19th century painting signed by François Grellet, from the museum of Montélimar, now held at the Town Hall, depicts Margot Delaye. It was presented at the Salon of 1880 and acquired by the French State, then given to the city of Montélimar. An engraving was taken from it.
