= Aardenburg =

- Small city
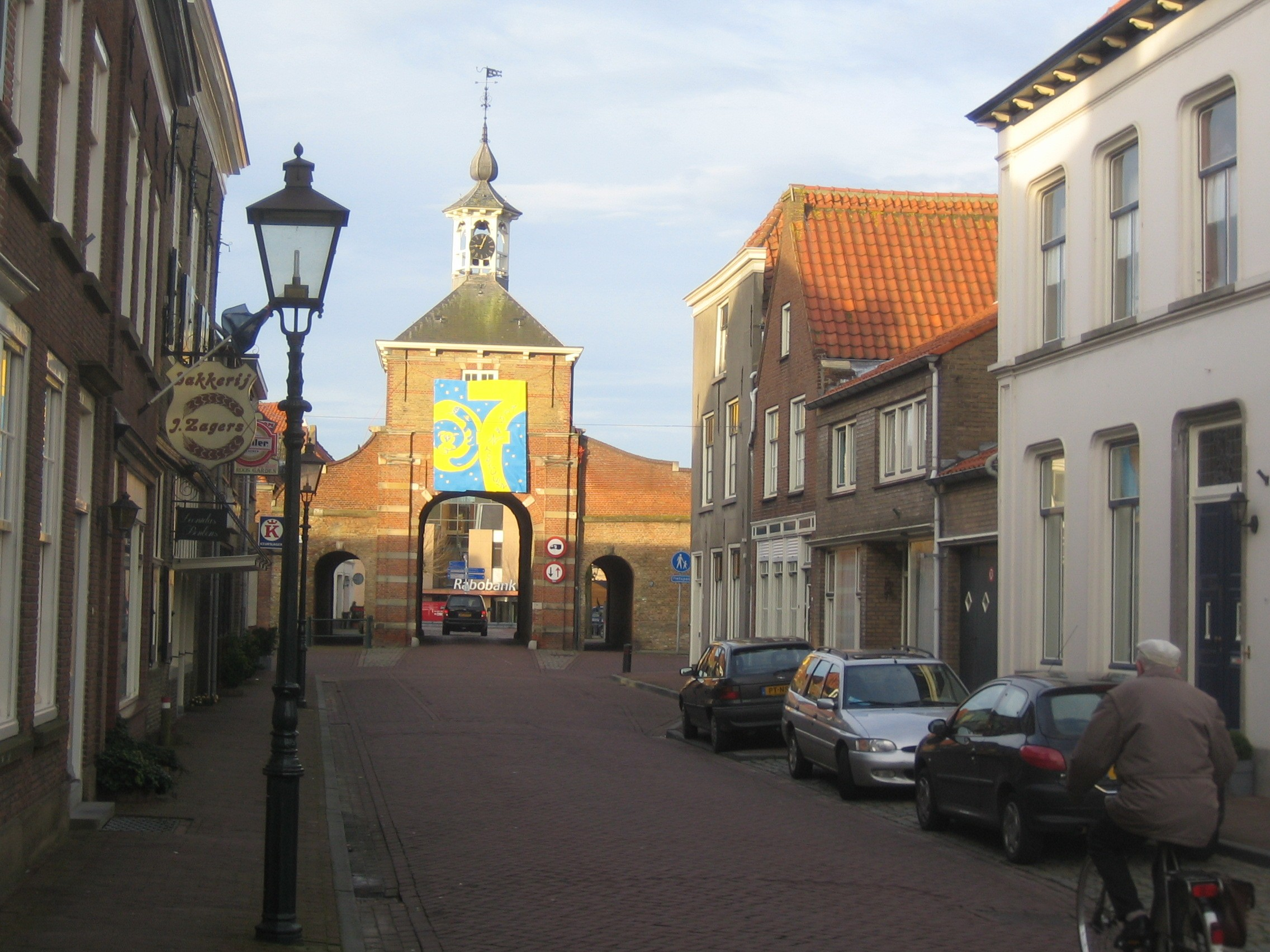
- Western Gate in c. 2007

- Flag Coat of arms

- Location of Aardenburg in the province of Zeeland Aardenburg (Netherlands)
- Coordinates: 51°16′28″N 3°26′43″E
- Country: Netherlands
- Province: Zeeland
- Municipality: Sluis

Area
  - Total: 31.82 km^{2} (12.29 sq mi)
- Elevation: 2.1 m (6.9 ft)

Population (2021)
  - Total: 2,520
  - Density: 79.2/km^{2} (205/sq mi)
- Time zone: UTC+1 (CET)
  - Summer (DST): UTC+2 (CEST)
- Postal code: 4527
- Dialing code: 0117

Aardenburg is a small city close to the Dutch border with Belgium. It is part of the Sluis Municipality, located in the province of Zeeland in the Netherlands. Its medieval name was Rodenburgh (Red Castle).

In the Sint-Baafskerk, (Saint Bavo's Church), Aardenburg houses the most complete example of the Scheldegotiek, the characteristic Gothic architecture of the Scheldt. It is also still possible today to see remains of some of the fortifications that used to enclose the city.

== History ==
Archeologists have found proof of settlement as early as 4500 BC. The site was a small Roman vicus, flourishing in the second and third centuries AD, where the foundations have been uncovered of a small Celto-Roman temple. After the Second World War restorations to damaged buildings uncovered fragments of Roman rooftiles, of which some bear the markings of a Roman military post, as well as black vases and Roman sandals. The most significant find, however, was that of a Roman building with a foundation of 18 by 10 meters. The Roman Castellum was in use from 175 to 270 AD.

On top of the foundations of this Roman building there were the remains of a Medieval building, which was destroyed in 1383 according to later accounts. Rodenburgh was granted city rights in 1127 and is thus one of the oldest cities in the Netherlands and is the oldest city in Zealand.

On 25-26 June 1672 it was the French tried to take over but the citizens resisted bravely

Until 1 January 1995 Aardenburg was a separate municipality. Then, until 1 January 2003, it was in the municipality of Sluis-Aardenburg. In 2003 Sluis-Aardenburg and nearby Oostburg were combined into an enlarged Sluis municipality.

Aardenburg was walled at the end of the thirteenth century: the present Kaaipoort at the old town's western entrance dates only from the sixteenth century. The name of the gate recalls Aardenburg's former harbour, the site of which is now dominated by a bank. The blue banner decorating the Kaaipoort in this picture is a temporary embellishment, celebrating the carnival that precedes Lent.

== Gallery ==
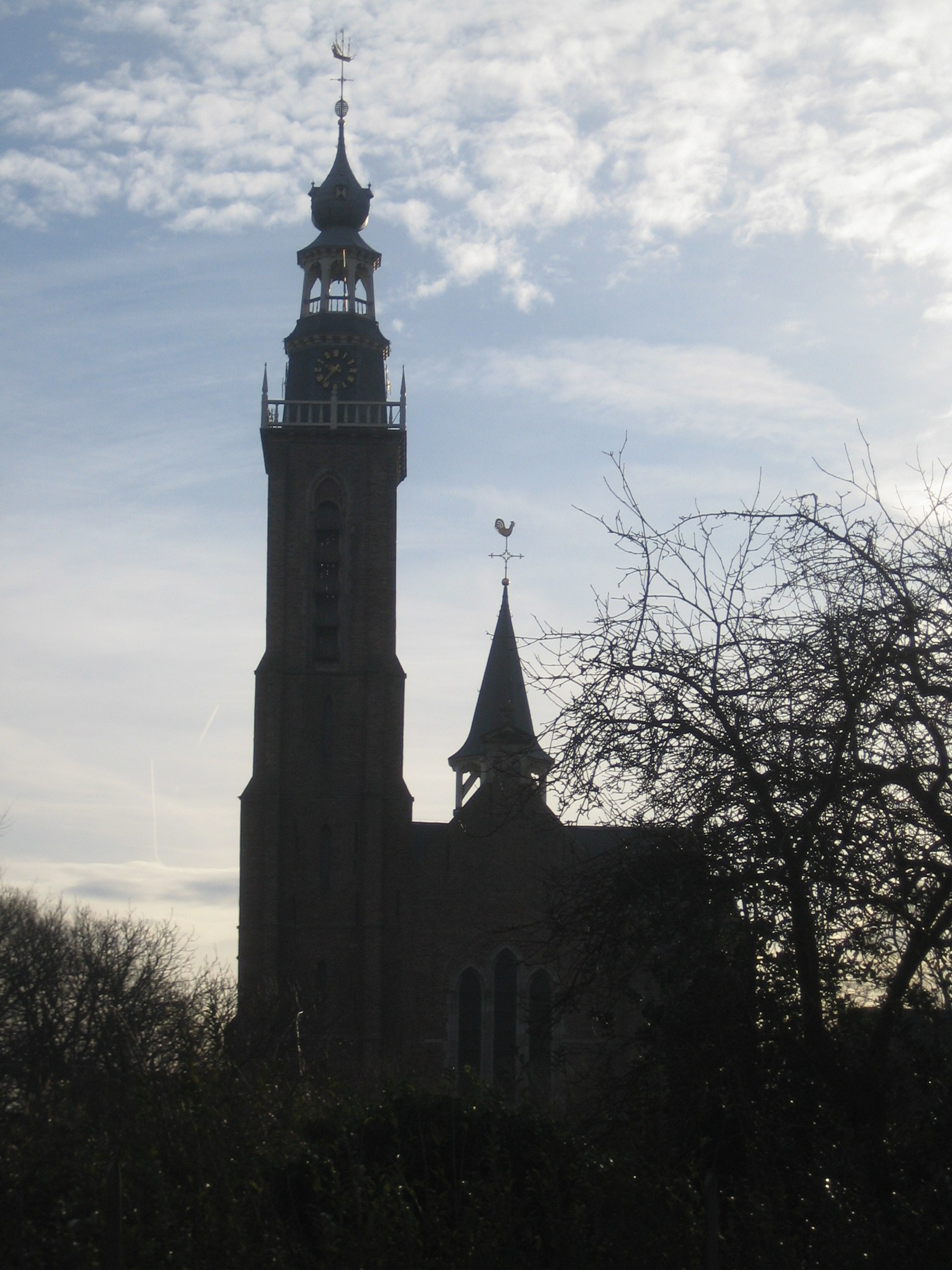
Sint-Baafskerk / Saint Bavo's Church, Aardenburg from the west

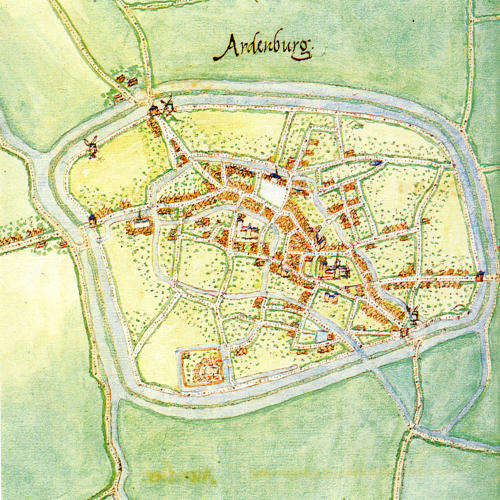
Aardenburg around 1560

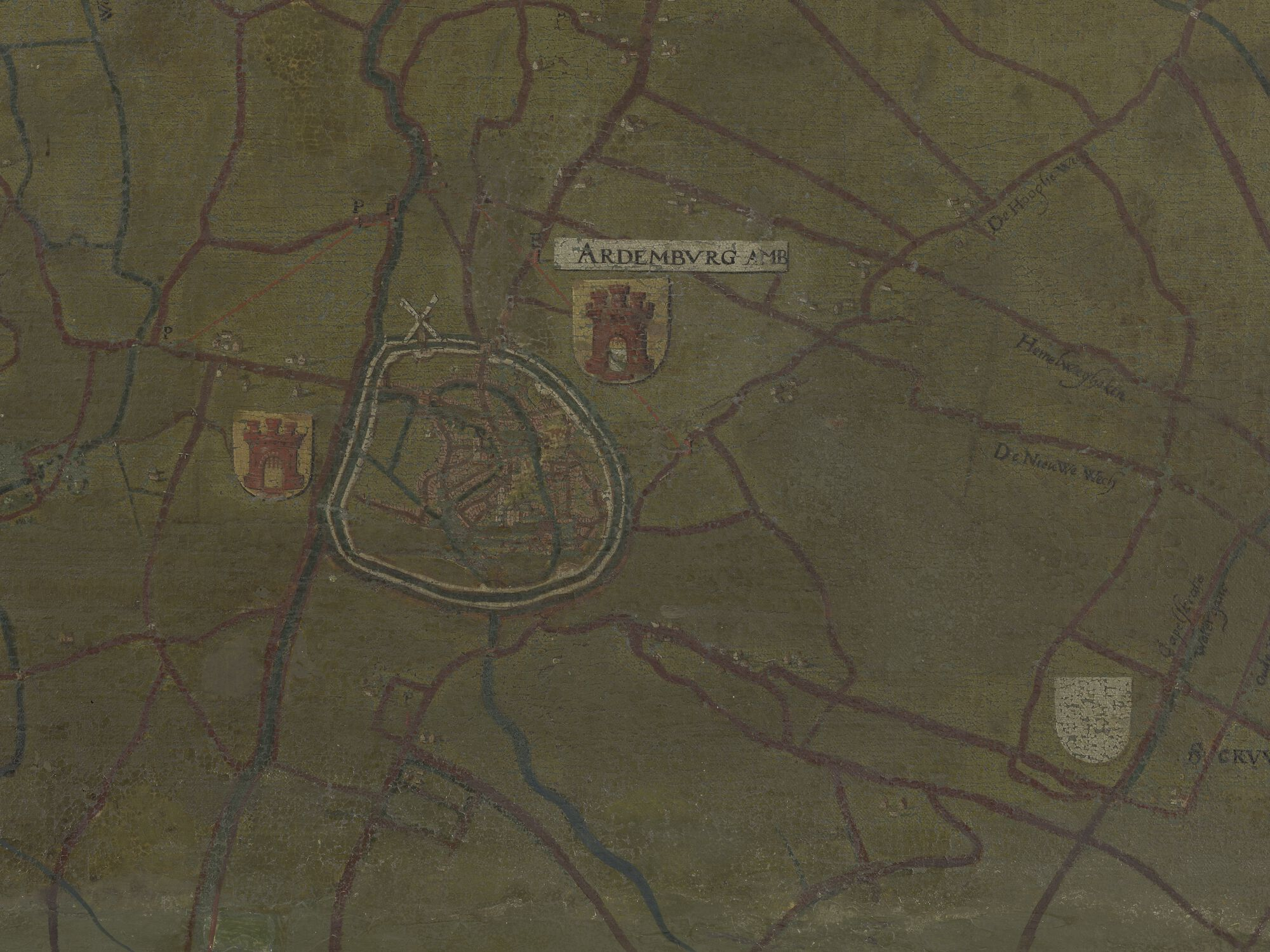
Aardenburg on the map of the Liberty Of Bruges by Pieter Pourbus, 1571

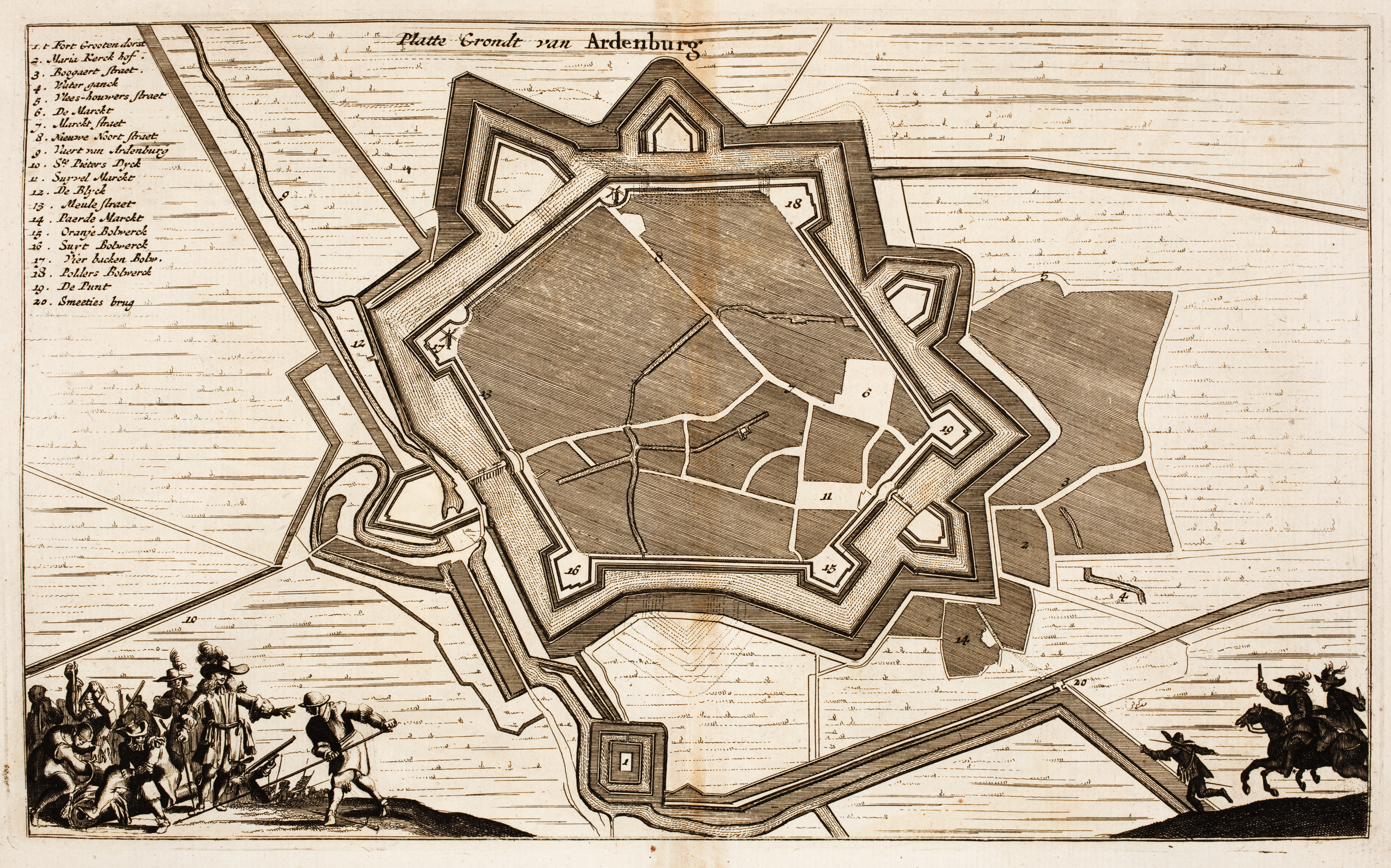
Map of the fortifications of Aardenburg, before 1675

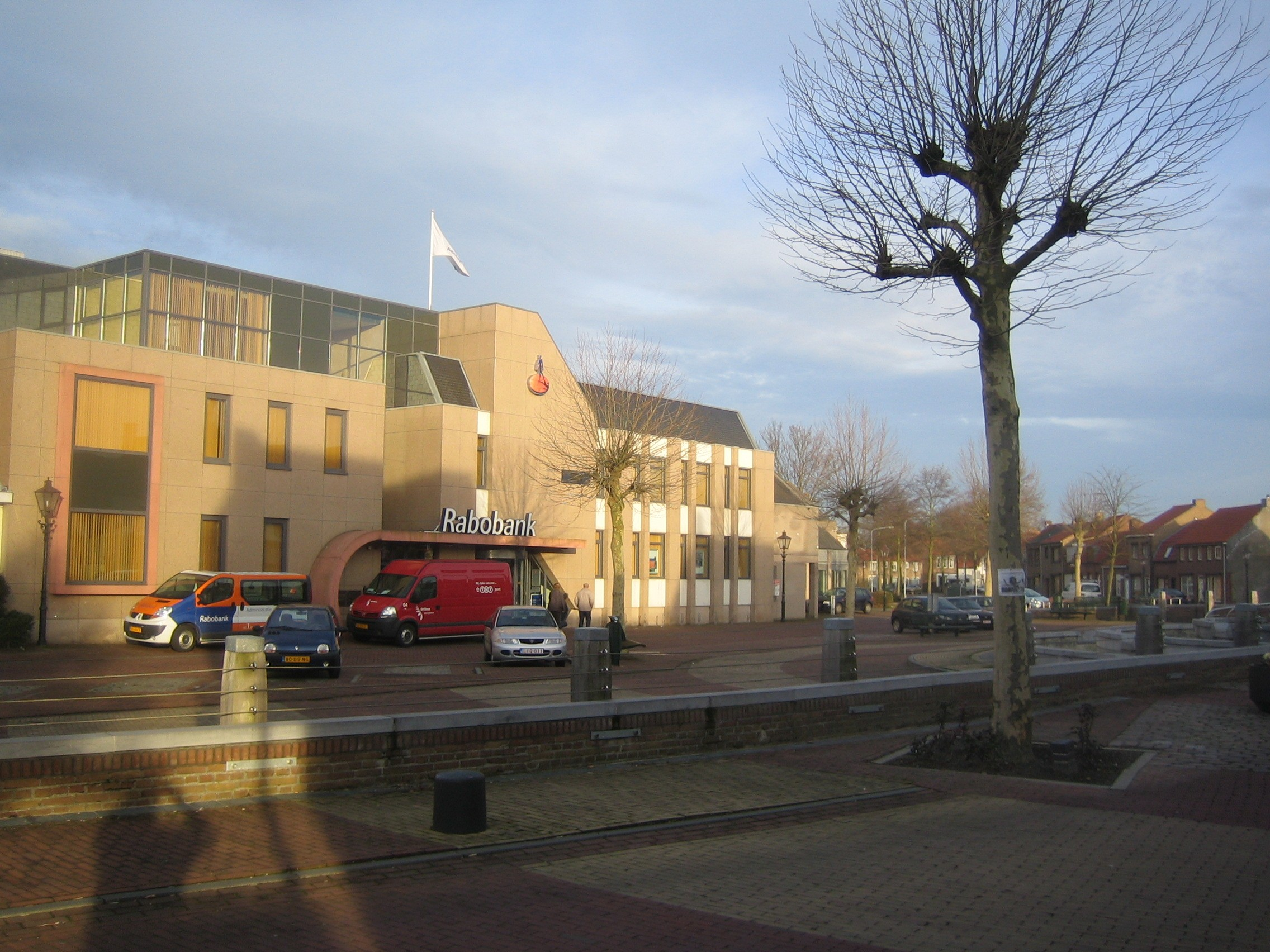
Rabobank and the ABN Amro shared the site of Aardenburg's former harbour.

== Born in Aardenburg ==
- Frans Dieleman (1942-2005), Dutch geographer
- Ate de Jong (born 1953), Dutch film director.
