= Kōzōsu =

Japanese noble lady, aristocrat and retainer of the Toyotomi clan

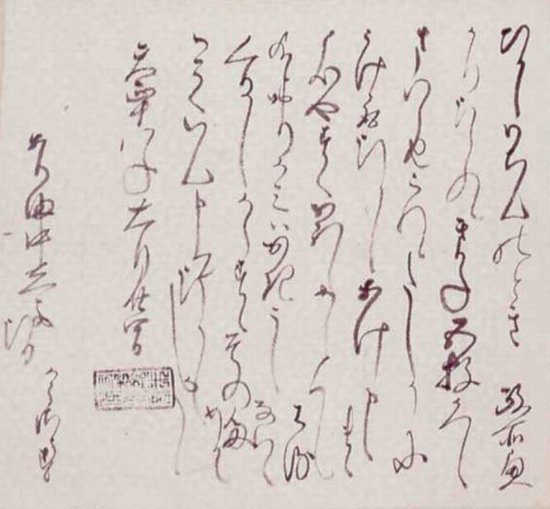
A black-sealed letter of Kodai-in, written by Kōzōsu, to Arima Noriyori, the Lord Mita of Settsu, acknowledging the reimbursement of the money she had been loaning to the lord.

Kōzōsu (孝蔵主) was a Japanese noble lady, aristocrat and retainer of the Toyotomi clan. She was the daughter of Kawazoe Katsuhige, a retainer of the Gamō clan. She was an elite female officer under Nene's command and chief secretary to Toyotomi Hideyoshi.

Although her true name remains a mystery, she was an elite female officer under Nene's command and chief secretary to Toyotomi Hideyoshi, and later served as the chief lady-in-waiting to Tokugawa Hidetada. "Kōzōsu" was her courtly title as a lady-in-waiting, signifying her distinguished position.

During the Toyotomi administration she possessed such authority that it was said that while Asano Nagamasa may run matters outside, Kōzōsu ran matters inside. She accompanied the Toyotomi clan in Japan's unification campaigns.

== Life ==
=== Service to Nene ===
The exact commencement of her service to Nene (Kodai-in) remains uncertain, but by the time Toyotomi Hideyoshi ascended to the position of Kanpaku (Imperial Regent), she had assumed responsibility for managing the inner affairs of the court. In 1590, during the 18th year of the Tenshō era, she sent a formal inquiry letter to Date Masamune, who was suspected of rebellion, on behalf of Hideyoshi. Moreover, In 1597, she supervised practical matters when the punitive relocation of Kobayakawa Hideaki, from Chikuzen Province to Echizen Province was decided. She was even entrusted with persuading Toyotomi Hidetsugu, who was accused of treason, to present himself at Osaka Castle. Her role in delivering tribute items to the Imperial Court further underscored her prominent status among the lady-in-waiting staff of Nene. Consequently, it was said that "Asano Nagamasa handles external matters, while Kōzōsu manages internal affairs," highlighting her authority.

She also preserved the tanzaku (small strips of paper) bearing Toyotomi Hideyoshi's final poem, "Like dew, I fall, like dew, I vanish; what I am, who can know? Naniwa, a dream within a dream," which was composed in April 1588 during the visit of Emperor Go-Yōzei to Jurakudai. She retained this tanzaku for an extended period.

=== Sekigahara Campaign ===
Following Hideyoshi's death in 1598, Kōzōsu, along with Nene, left Osaka Castle in 1599 and relocated to Sanbonmoku, near modern-day Gion in Kyoto. After the death of Toyotomi Hideyoshi, the power of the Toyotomi clan declined and Japan would go to war again. In 1600 in the Battle of Sekigahara, the country was divided in two armys, Ishida Mitsunari of the Western army against the Eastern Army of Tokugawa Ieyasu.

Kozosu continued to serve as an attendant to Nene at this time. It is said that Kosozu supported the Western army as well as Nene, involving herself in tasks such as negotiating peace settlements during the Siege of Ōtsu Castle and negotiating with Tokugawa Ieyasu. The Battle of Sekigahara ended in Tokugawa's favor and many of the Toyotomi clan's loyalists were penalized.

=== Service to Tokugawa Hidetada ===
In 1603, three years after the Battle of Sekigahara, Ieyasu becomes Shogun. This caused much discontent with Toyotomi loyalists, which would lead to civil war between Toyotomi and Tokugawa again in 1614.

However, in 1614, just before the Siege of Osaka, Kosozu went to Suruga Province (present-day Shizuoka) and later received a residence in Edo Castle's vicinity from Tokugawa Hidetada. In October 1625, she was granted a 200-koku domain in Fukai Village, Kawachi Province (now part of Osaka Prefecture) in the October following Nene's first memorial service after her death in 1624.

=== Legacy and death ===
Kozosu died in 1626, a year after becoming a castelan in Kawachi Province, never having married or borne children. Her nephew, Kawasoe Shigetsugu (who died during the Siege of Osaka), became her adopted son and inherited the 200-koku domain. She is interred at Nansen-ji Temple in Nishi-Nippori, Arakawa Ward, Tokyo.

== Relocation to Edo ==
The circumstances surrounding her move to Edo remain shrouded in mystery. Several hypotheses have been proposed:

1. She abandoned Nene after losing faith in the Toyotomi clan.
2. She fled to Edo out of fear for her life due to suspicions of collusion with the Tokugawa shogunate raised by Yodo-dono.
3. She initially supported the Western Army during the Battle of Sekigahara, given her family ties to Ishida Mitsunari (her nephew, Okabe Shigemasa, was married to Mitsunari's second daughter). However, after the deaths of Mitsunari and his allies, she severed ties with them and began communicating with the Toyotomi loyalists, which Kōzōsu strongly opposed.
4. To repay the kindness she and Nene had shown to Tokugawa Hidetada when he was sent to Hideyoshi's service as a 12-year-old hostage, Kōzōsu was invited to Edo with Nene's consent.
5. Her relocation was orchestrated by Tokugawa Ieyasu as part of a broader strategy to ease tensions and foster reconciliation between the Toyotomi and Tokugawa clans.

These conflicting theories continue to fuel the enduring mystery surrounding Kosozu's move to Edo.
