= Women in 18th-century warfare =

Aspect of women's history

Women have contributed to military activities including as combatants. The following list describes women known to have participated in military actions in the 18th century. For women in warfare in the United States at this time, please see Timeline of women in war in the United States, pre-1945.

== Timeline of women in warfare from 18th century warfare worldwide (except the present US) ==
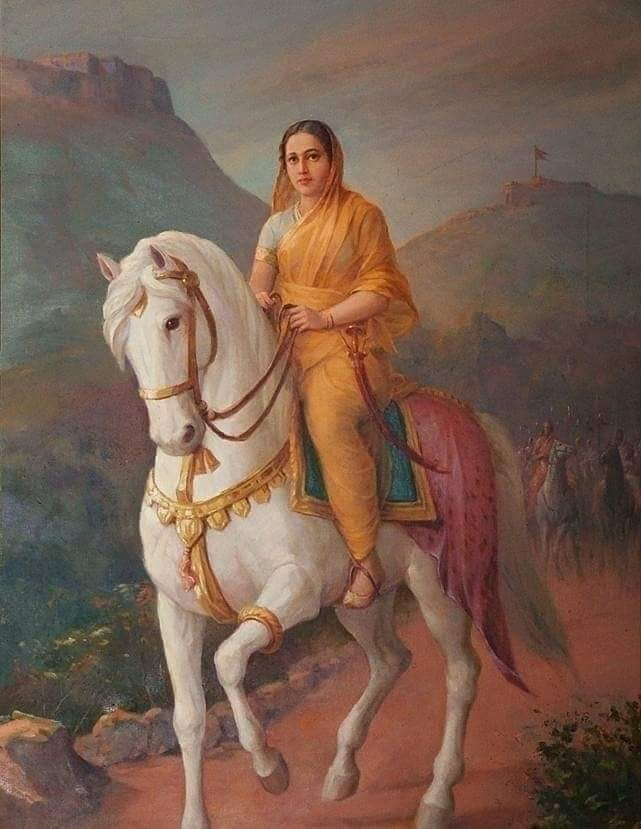
Tarabai

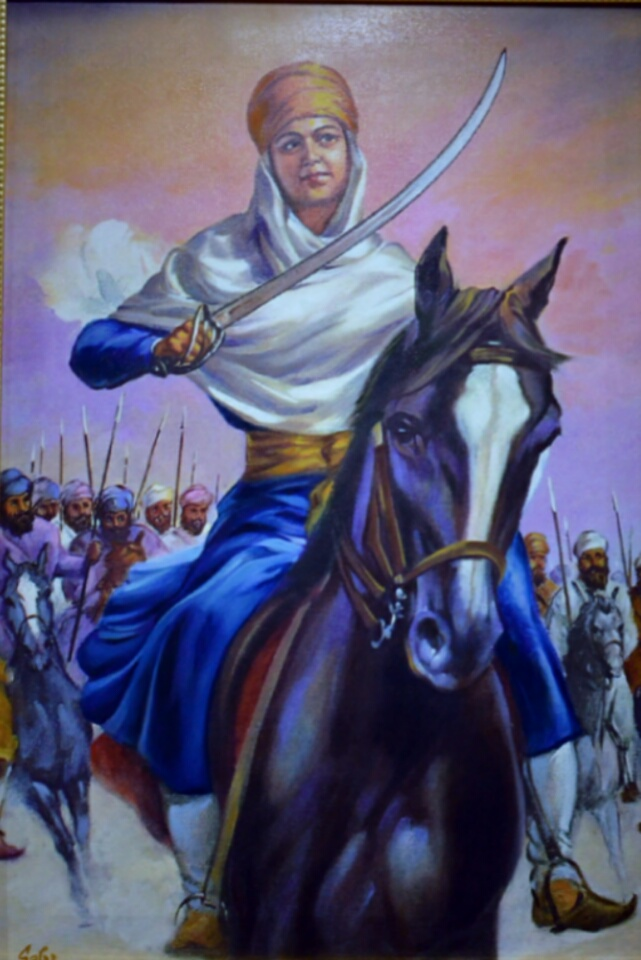
Mai Bhago

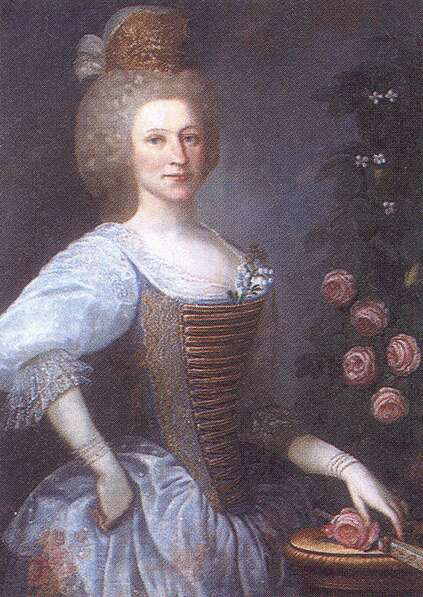
Julianna Géczy

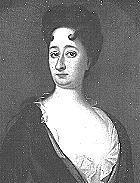
Margareta von Ascheberg

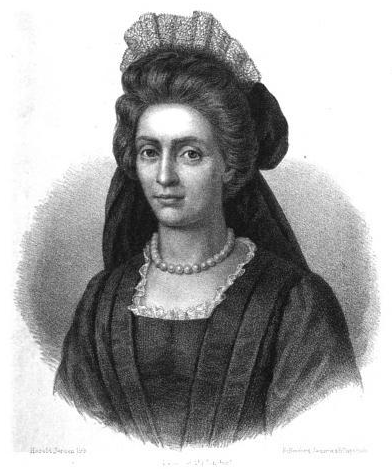
Anna Colbjørnsdatter

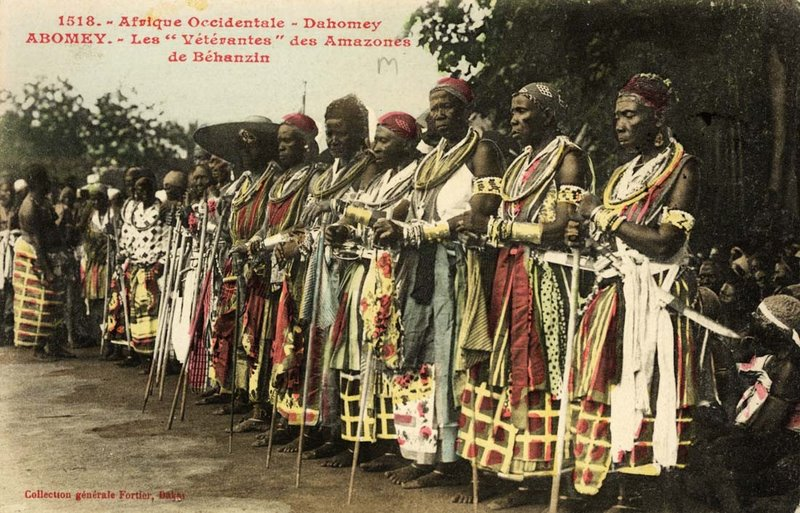
Dahomey Amazons

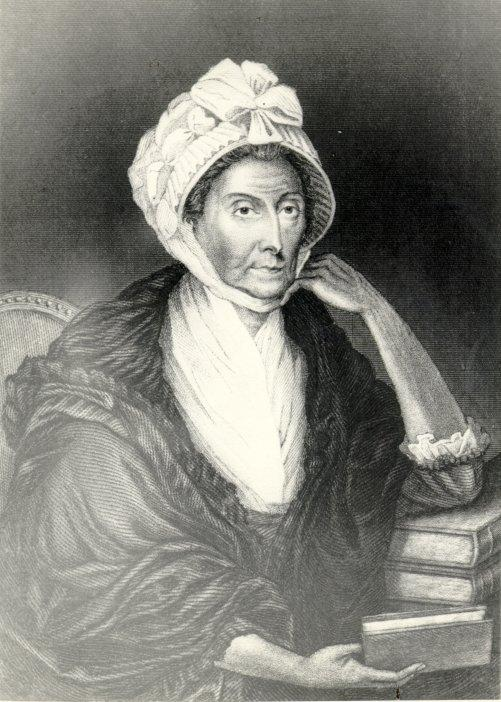
Phoebe Hessel

Hannah Snell

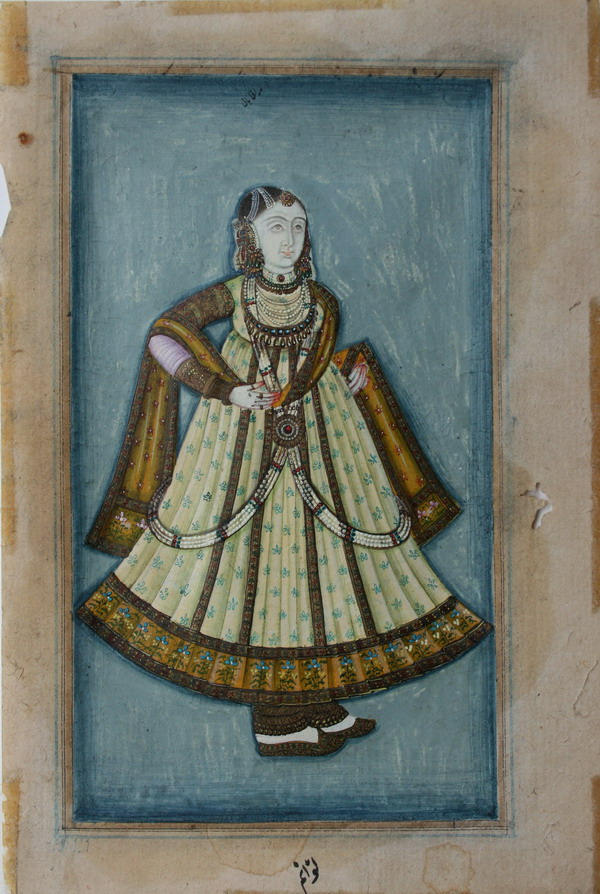
Mah Laqa Bai

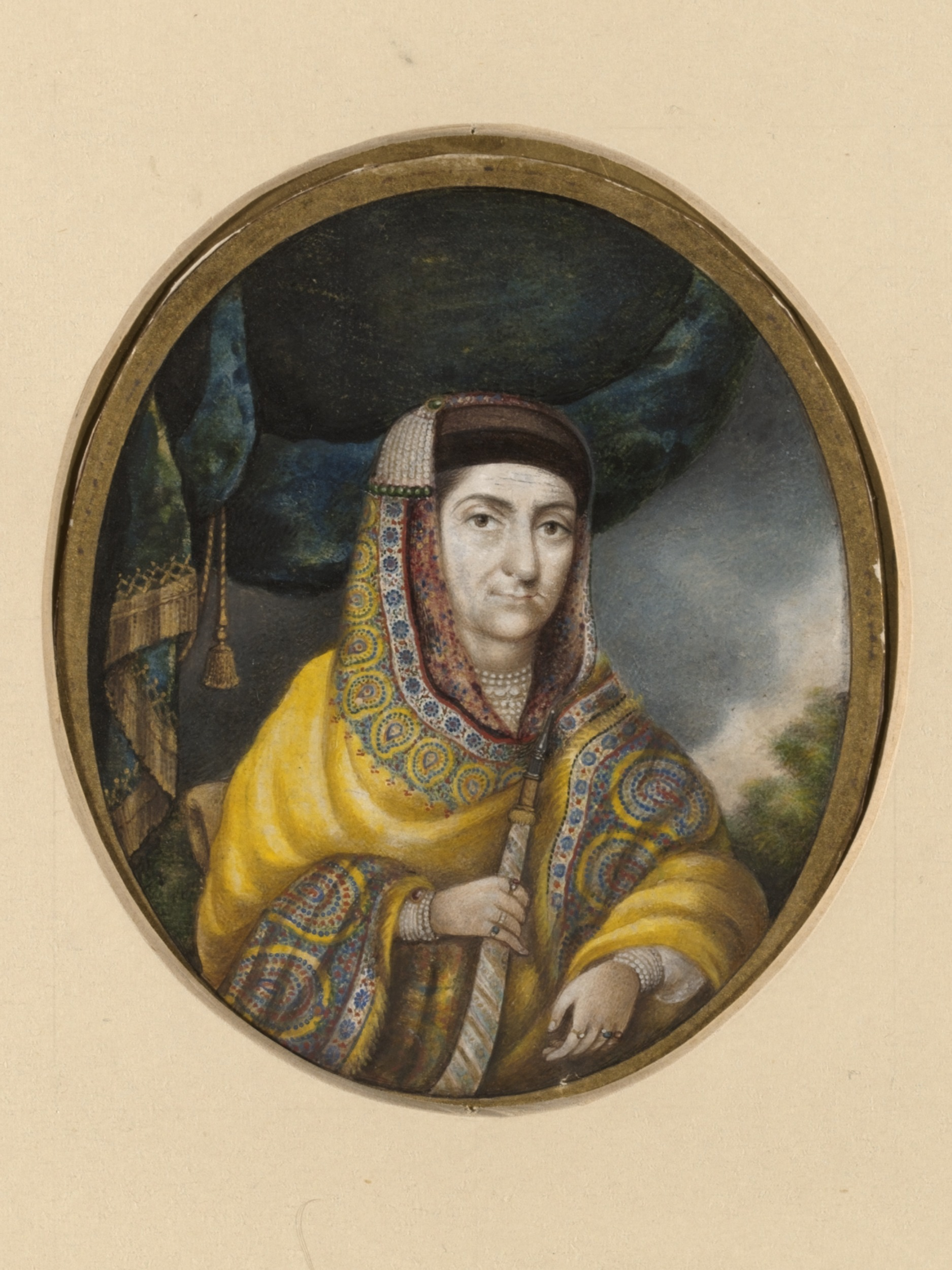
Begum Samru

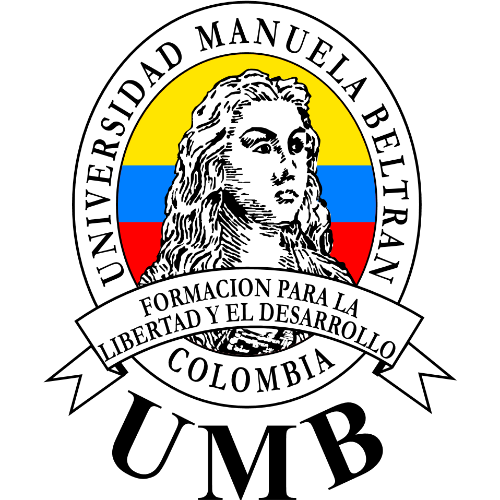
Manuela Beltrán

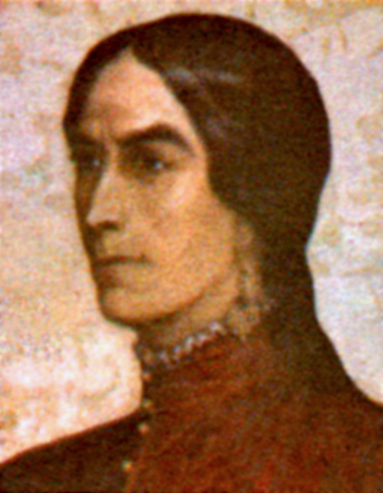
Micaela Bastidas Puyucahua

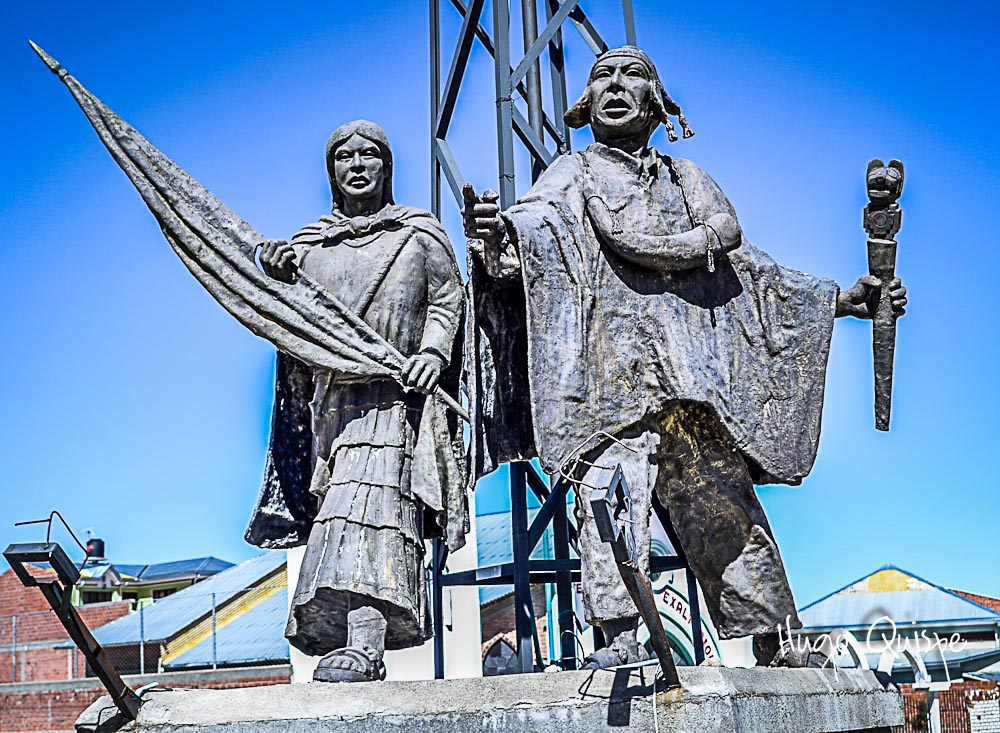
Statue of Bartolina Sisa alongside Túpac Katari

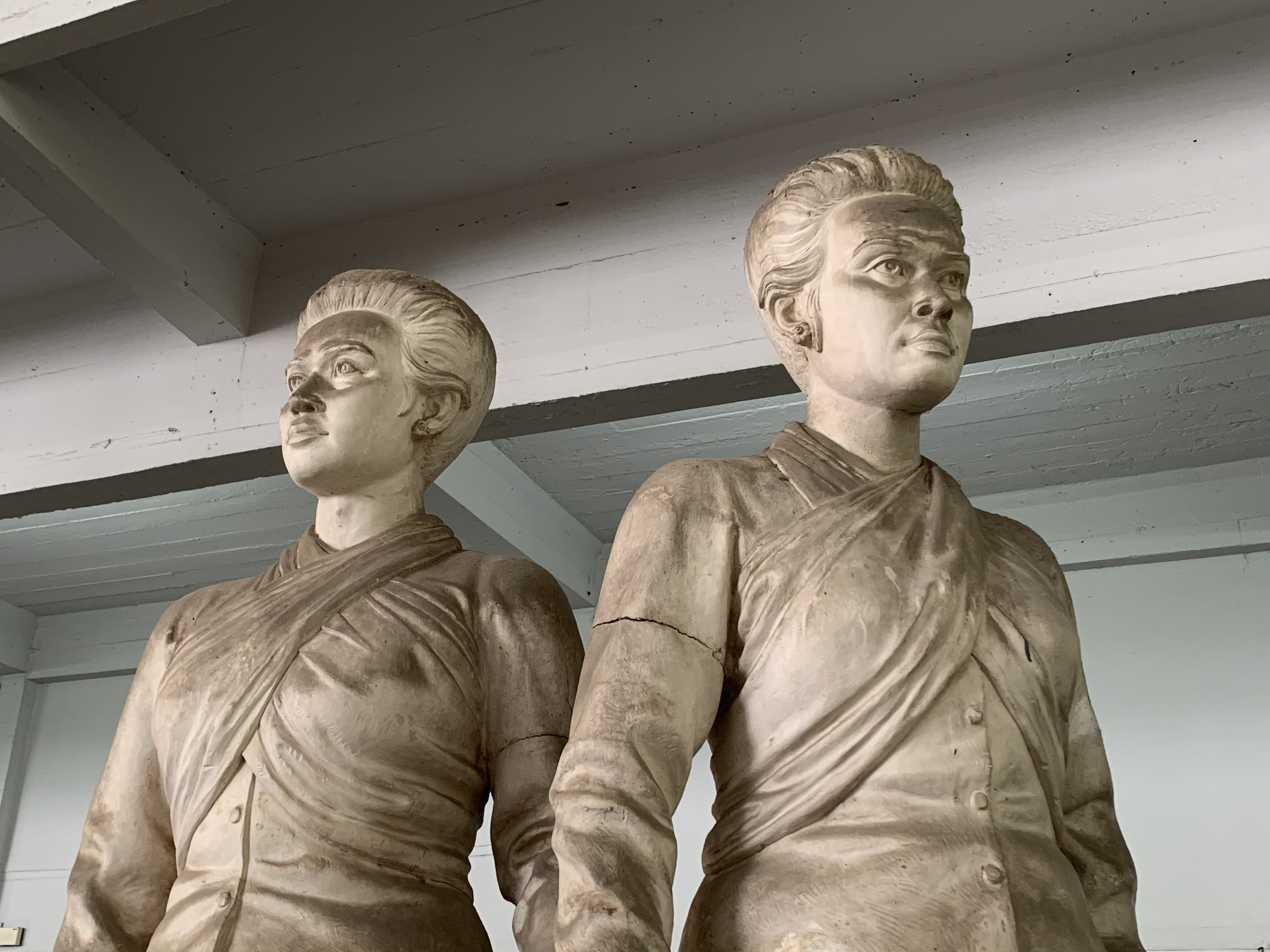
Thao Thep Kasattri and Thao Sri Sunthon

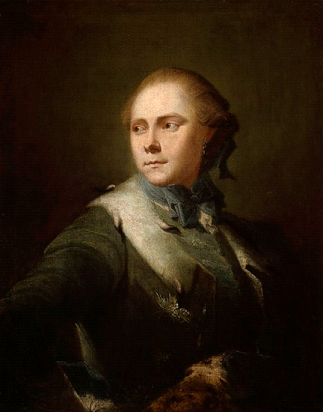
Dorothea Maria Lösch

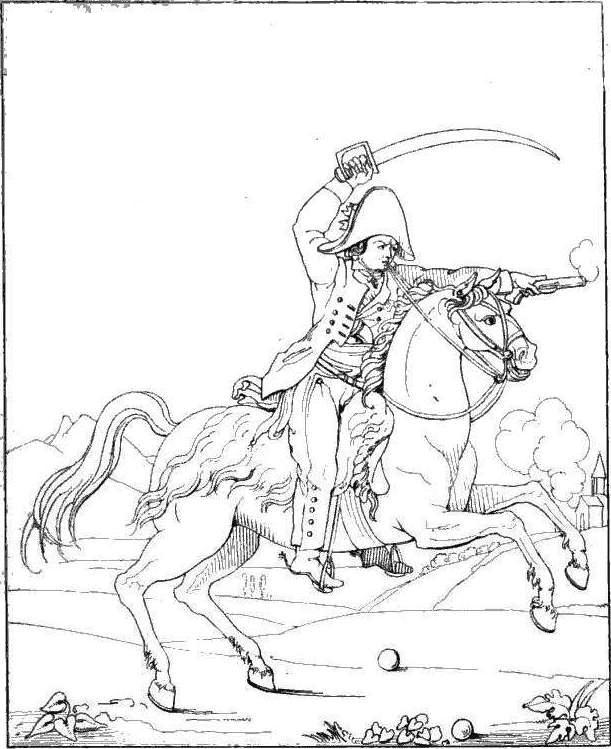
Renée Bordereau

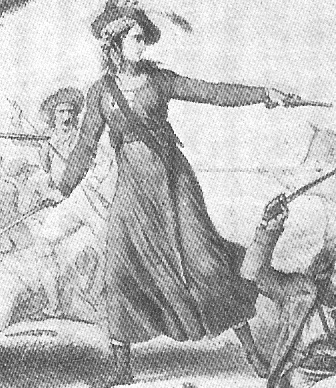
Céleste Bulkeley

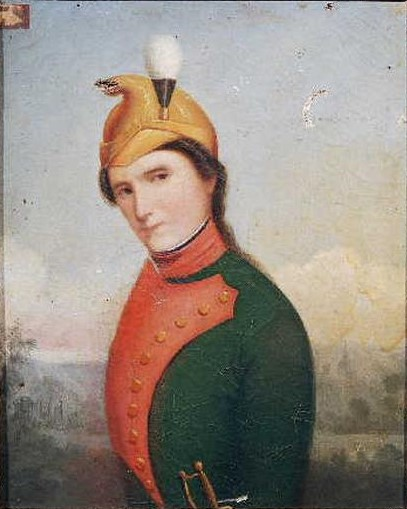
Marie-Thérèse Figueur

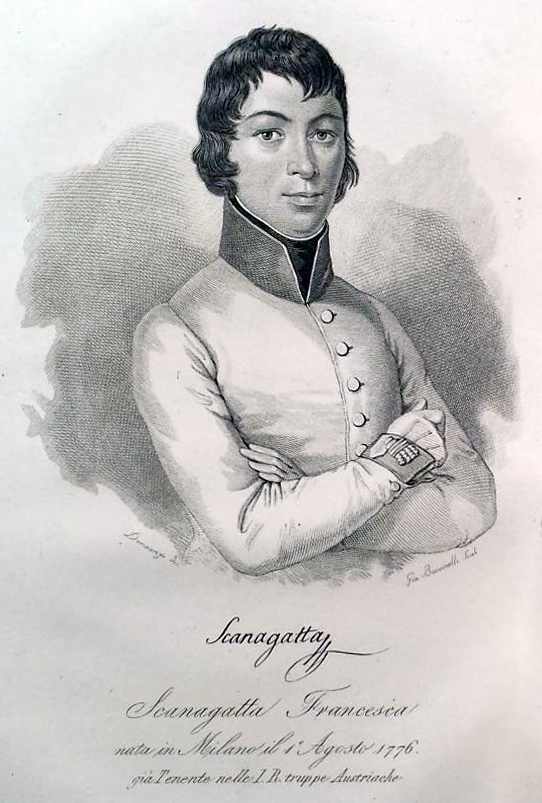
Franziska Scanagatta

=== 18th century ===
- 1700–1721: An unnamed woman serves in the Swedish army in the Great Northern War; after the war, she is seen wearing men's clothing on the streets of Stockholm until the 1740s, where she was known as "The Rider".
- 1700s: Tomasa Tito Condemayta acts as a military strategist and leader of a woman's battalion during Rebellion of Túpac Amaru II.
- 1700s: Maria Ursula d'Abreu e Lencastro joined the Portuguese navy dressed as a man under the name Balthazar do Conto Cardoso, sailed for Portugal, joined the army, and took part in battles in India.
- 1700s: Ingela Gathenhielm serves as a privateer for King Charles XII of Sweden Great Northern War.
- 1700s: Margareta von Ascheberg acting colonel of her dead husband's regiment during the Great Northern War.
- 1700: During the Battle of Narva, Swedish forces manage to capture some of the Russian soldiers besieging Narva, and discover them to be women dressed as males.
- 1700: Charlotte Amalie of Hesse-Cassel organize the defense of Copenhagen against invasion.
- 1700–1709: Tarabai, an empress of the Maratha Empire in India, becomes the Empress regent of her son and successfully fights and defeats the Mughals.
- 1700–1712: Maria Ursula d'Abreu e Lencastro fights in the Portuguese army in India.
- 1702: Anna Isabella Gonzaga, Duchess of Mantua, defends Mantua during the War of the Spanish Succession as regent during the absence of her spouse.
- 1702: Marij Jacobs Weijers serves in the Dutch army dressed as a male.
- 1705: Mai Bhago leads Sikh soldiers against the Mughals.
- 1705–1708: Catharina Margaretha Linck serves as a soldier in the armies of Hanover, Prussia, Hesse, and Poland.
- 1705: Grietje Harmense Knipsaar serves in the Dutch army dressed as a male under the name Dirk Jansen.
- 1706: Gertruid ter Brugge serves in the Dutch dragoons and is afterward a local celebrity known as "La Dragonne".
- 1709–10: The Hungarian noblewoman Géczy Julianna defends Lőcse against the Habsburg forces during the rebellion of Francis II Rákóczi.

=== 1710s ===
- 1710s: During the Great Northern War, Maria Faxell, the wife of a vicar, defends her village against a Norwegian attack by handing out old weapons to both men and women during her husband's absence.
- 1711–1721: Ingela Gathenhielm operates the Swedish Privateering fleet jointly with her husband during the Great Northern War; when widowed in 1718, she continues herself.
- 1712: María de la Candelaria leads a revolt against the Spanish crown.
- 1712–1714: Anna Jöransdotter from Finland serves in the Swedish army under the named Johan Haritu.
- 1712–1717: Three unnamed females are discovered to have served in the Dutch Marines dressed as males.
- 1713–1721: Margareta Elisabeth Roos serves in the Swedish army while disguised as a man.
- 1713–1726: Ulrika Eleonora Stålhammar serves in the Swedish army under Charles XII of Sweden during the Great Northern War.
- 1713–1714: Annika Svahn, as well as several other enslaved Finnish women taken captive by the Russians, are forced to participate in the Russian conquest of Swedish Finland on the battle fields during the Greater Wrath dressed in Russian dragoon uniforms.
- 1715: Two unnamed women are rumored to have served among the soldiers in the Swedish army, one of them a wife of one of the soldiers, who by this point was to have served for a period of four years.
- 1715–1718: Anna Maria Christmann serves in the Austrian army under Prince Eugene of Savoy during the Ottoman–Venetian War (1714–1718).
- 1716: Norwegian Anna Colbjørnsdatter is granted the success in the victory over the Swedes at the Battle of Norderhov in Norway during the Great Northern War 29 March 1716 by capturing 600 Swedish soldiers.
- 1716: Norwegian Kari Hiran averts the Swedish attempt to conquer Norway by feeding them false information about the size of the Norwegian army.
- 1718: Hangbe in the Kingdom of Dahomey becomes the ruler after her twin brother Akaba is killed. She may have led military campaigns.
- 1719: Brita Olsdotter, an old Swedish woman, meets the Russian army, who marches against Linköping after having burnt Norrköping, and makes them turn around and leave after telling them that reinforcements were arriving to assist Linköping.

=== 1720s ===
- 1720–1739: Granny Nanny, a spiritual leader of the Maroons of Jamaica, leads rebel slaves to victory in First Maroon War.
- 1721: Comtesse de Polignac, previously the lover of Duc de Richelieu, fights a duel with her rival and successor, the Marchioness de Nesle.
- 1722: Six unnamed females are shipped back to the Netherlands after having been exposed to have served as males in either the Dutch Marines or army in an attempt to emigrate to the Dutch East Indies.
- 1723: Lumke Thoole serve in the Dutch navy dressed as a male under the name Jan Theunisz.
- 1725: Dutch woman Maria ter Meetelen serves in the Spanish army dressed as a man.
- 1726: Maria Elisabeth Meening served in the Dutch navy dressed as a male.
- 1727: Dahomey Amazons are founded.

=== 1730s ===
- 1732: An unnamed female serves in the Dutch army dressed as a male.
- 1733: Breffu leads the 1733 slave insurrection on St. John.
- 1738–1752: Johanna Sophia Kettner serve in the imperial Austrian infantry for fourteen years in the guise of a man and is promoted to feldwebel.

=== 1740s ===
- 1740: Ann Mills fights on the frigate Maidenstone as a dragoon.
- 1741–1743: Maria van de Gijessen served in the Dutch navy under then name Claes van de Gijessen.
- 1743: Johanna Sophia Kettner disguises herself as a man and enlists in the Austrian army.
- 1744: An unnamed female serve in the Dutch navy dressed as a male.
- 1745: Jacobina (last name unknown) served in the Dutch navy dressed as a male.
- 1745: An unnamed female served in the Dutch navy dressed as a male.
- 1745: Phoebe Hessel fights in the Battle of Fontenoy. She had disguised herself as a man to do so.
- 1745: Scottish Mary Ralphson fights in the British army in Battle of Fontenoy dressed as a man
- 1746: Johanna Bennius serve in the Dutch navy dressed as a male under the name Jan Drop.
- 1746: Elisabeth Huyser serve in the Dutch army dressed as a male.
- 1746–1769: Maria van Antwerpen serves as a soldier in the Netherlands under the name Jan van Art.
- 1748: Gertruid van Duiren enlists and briefly serve in the Dutch army before being discovered
- 1747–1750: Hannah Snell, serve disguised as a man in the Royal Marine: her military service is officially recognized in 1750, and she is granted a pension.

=== 1750s ===
- 1750: Maria Sophia Stording serve in the Dutch navy dressed as a man.
- 1751: Two unnamed soldiers of the Dutch navy are discovered to be females dressed as males.
- 1754: An unnamed female serve in the Dutch army dressed as a man.
- 1755: An unnamed female serve in the Dutch navy dressed as a man.
- 1756: Soldier Jochem Wiesse of the Dutch army are discovered to be a female dressed as a male.
- 1757: Sailor "Arthur Douglas" is revealed to be a woman. Her birth-name is unknown.
- 1757: An unnamed female serve in the Dutch army dressed as a man.
- 1757–58: Two unnamed females serve in the Dutch navy dressed as a males.
- 1759–1771: Mary Lacy serves as a Marine carpenter under the name of "William Chandler".

=== 1760s ===
- 1760s: Petronella van den Kerkhof possibly serve in the Dutch army as a grenadier: however, as she was not discovered during service, this is unconfirmed.
- 1760–1761: A woman serves in the British Marines as "William Prothero".
- 1762: Rafaela Herrera inspires the outnumbered Spanish defenders to victory during a 1762 British siege of the Fortress of the Immaculate Conception in El Castillo village within El Castillo municipality, Nicaragua.
- 1763: After the assassination of her husband Diego, Filipina Gabriela Silang decided to continue his rebellion in Ilocos against Spain but was unsuccessful.
- 1764: The Dutch soldier Tiesheld is discovered to be a female dressed as a male.
- 1765: An unnamed member of the Dutch navy is discovered to be a female dressed as a male.
- 1768: Birth of Mah Laqa Bai. Due to her archery skills, she accompanied the Nizam II (Mir Nizam Ali Khan) in three wars;
- 1769: Anna Sophia Spiesen serve in the Dutch army dressed as a male under the name Claas Paulusse.

=== 1770s ===
- 1770–1771: Margareta Reymers serve in the Dutch navy dressed as a man: she is discovered by her pregnancy.
- 1772: Mademoiselle de Guignes and Mademoiselle d'Aguillon fight a duel in Paris.
- 1775: On Dec. 11, Jemima Warner was killed by an enemy bullet during the siege of Quebec. Mrs. Warner had originally accompanied her husband, PVT James Warner of Thompson's Pennsylvania Rifle Battalion, to Canada because she feared that he would become sick on the campaign trail and she wanted to nurse him. When PVT Warner eventually died in the wilderness en route to Quebec, Mrs. Warner buried him and stayed with the battalion as a cook.
- 1778: Baltazara Chuiza leads a rebellion against the Spanish in Ecuador.
- 1778: Sikh princess Bibi Rajindar Kaur leads 3,000 soldiers to rescue her cousin who was defeated by Hari Singh.
- 1778–1803: The ruling Princess of Sardhana, Begum Samru (Johanna Noblis), leads her armies in war.

=== 1780s ===
- 1780: Rani Velu Nachiar of Sivagangai Poligar leads a female army against the East India Company forces.
- 1780: Manuela Beltrán organizes a peasant revolt in Colombia.
- 1780: Ñusta Huillac of the Kolla tribe rebels against the Spanish in Chile.
- 1780s: Swedish runaway Carin du Rietz becomes a soldier at the royal guard.
- 1780–1781: Micaela Bastidas Puyucahua recruits and leads men and women in battle during a rebellion against the Spanish rule in Peru. She is eventually captured and executed by the Spanish.
- 1780–1781: Maria van Spanje serve in the Dutch navy for eight months dressed as a male: she is discovered while trying to repeat this when enlisting anew in 1782.
- 1781: Lena Catharina Wasmoet serve in the Dutch navy dressed as a man under the name Claas Waal.
- 1781: Gregoria Apaza, an Aymara woman, leads an uprising against the Spanish in Bolivia.
- 1781: Margaret Thompson serves in the Royal Marines under the name George Thompson.
- 1782: Anna Maria Everts serve in the Dutch navy dressed as a man.
- 1782: Bartolina Sisa, an Aymara woman who led an indigenous uprising against the Spanish in Bolivia, is captured and executed.
- 1783: Johanna Dorothea Heeght serve in the Dutch navy dressed as a man under the name Johannes Hegt.
- 1785: According to Thai legend, Thao Thep Kasattri and Thao Sri Sunthon, two sisters, help repel a Burmese invasion of Thailand by dressing as male soldiers and rallying the troops.
- 1787–1807: A woman serves twenty years in the Royal Marines under the name "Tom Bowling"
- 1787: The wife of the German colonel Schutz is reported to have accompanied her spouse dressed as a male in warfare and having been wounded two times in Russian service.
- 1788–1790: After the war between Russia and Sweden, several of the soldiers decorated in the Swedish army are discovered to be women in disguise. One of them is Brita Hagberg, who enlisted in search of her husband; she is given a military pension.
- 1788–1790: During the Russo-Swedish war, Anna Maria Engsten, after a battle at sea, singlehandedly steers one of the boats back to Sweden after having been left alone onboard after its evacuation; she is decorated for bravery at sea.
- 1788–1790: During the Battle of Svensksund, Dorothea Maria Lösch takes command of a Swedish ship and is rewarded with the rank of captain of the Swedish fleet.

=== 1790s ===
- 1791–1813: Bulgarian heroine Sirma Voyevoda fight in the Bulgarian guerilla army against Ottoman oppression.
- 1792: Reine Audu participates in the fight with the Swiss guards in the storming of the Tuileries Palace.
- 1792: The Greek woman Moscho Tzavela leads several women in defense of their village against the Turks.
- 1792–1793: The sisters Félicité de Fernig and Théophile de Fernig, known as Sœurs Fernig serve in the French army during the battles of Valmy, Jemappes, Anderlecht, and Neerwinden.
- 1792: Mary Anne Talbot may have served as a soldier and sailor in the British army during the French revolutionary wars.
- 1792: Lady Braddock and Mrs. Elphinstone fight a duel in England.
- 1792–1808: Marie-Jeanne Schellinck serves in French army. She participates in the Battle of Jemappes.
- 1792–1799: Angélique Brûlon serves in the French army in Corsica.
- 1793: Suzanne Bélair, called Sanité Bélair, serves in the armé of Toussaint Louverture during the Haitian Revolution. She was promoted to sergeant, and was executed by the French in 1802.
- 1790s: Victoria Montou serves in the army of Jean-Jacques Dessalines during the Haitian Revolution.
- 1793-1795: Several women are known to have dressed as men and sorved as soldiers on the Royalst side, such as: Mme Regrenil, Mme du Fief, "Chevalier Adam", who all survived the war and returned to their feminine identity afterward, and Jeanne Robin, who served under General Lescure and died in the Battle of Thouars in September 1793.
- 1793: Renée Bordereau disguises herself as a man and fights as a Royalist cavalier in the French Revolution.
- 1793: Françoise Deprés serve as a royalist spy, courier and soldier dressed as a male during the Vendée rebellion.
- 1793: Céleste Bulkeley serve in the Catholic and Royal Army during the war in the Vendée as one of at least six women known as the amazons in the army of François de Charette.
- 1793–1800: Marie-Thérèse Figueur serves openly in the French army.
- 1793: An unnamed female serve in the Dutch navy dressed as a man.
- 1794: Ana María de Soto starts serving in the Spanish Marine Infantry dressed as a man.
- 1796: Sikh princess Bibi Sahib Kaur leads her armies into battle against the East India Company.
- 1796–1798: Wang Cong'er is the leader and commander of the White Lotus rebellion in China.
- 1797: Rebel Wang Nangxian commands a rebel army against the Imperial forces during the White Lotus Rebellion.
- 1797: Jemima Nicholas single-handedly captured 12 French soldiers armed with only a pitchfork during the Battle of Fishguard (commonly known as the last invasion of Britain).
- 1797–1801: Franziska Scanagatta serve in the Austrian army: she is promoted a lieutenant in 1800.
- 1798: Mary Ann Riley and Anne Hopping serve in the Royal Marines during the Battle of the Nile against the French fleet in Egypt.
- 1798: Mary Doyle, an Irish woman, participates in the Irish Rebellion of 1798 on the side of the United Irishmen.
- 1798: Betsy Gray fought in the Battle of Ballynahinch against the Yeomanry.
- 1798–1815: Veronika Gut organize the resistance rebel movement against the French occupation of the Helvetic Republic in the Swiss canton of Nidwalden.
- 1799: The German Antoinette Berg serve on the side of the English against the French in the Netherlands dressed as a male; during the peace festivities in London after the final defeat of Napoleon in 1814, she was presented to the Tsar of Russia and the King of Prussia.

== See also ==
- Women in warfare and the military in the 19th century
