= Brita =

Brita may refer to:

== People ==
- Brita Appelgren (1912–1999), Swedish film actress
- Brita Baldus (born 1965), German diver, who competed for East Germany until the unification in 1991
- Brita Biörn (1667–1745?), Swedish folk healer
- Brita Bjørgum (1858–1906), Norwegian writer, teacher and women's rights activist
- Brita Borg (1926–2010), Swedish singer, actress, and variety show artist
- Brita Borge (1931–2013), Norwegian politician for the Conservative Party
- Brita Bratland (1910–1975), Norwegian folk singer
- Brita Catharina Lidbeck (1788–1864), Swedish Dilettante concert singer
- Brita Collett Paus (1917–1998), Norwegian humanitarian leader
- Brita Drewsen (1887–1983), Swedish artist and businesswoman
- Brita Filter, American drag queen
- Brita Granström (born 1969), Swedish artist who graduated from Konstfack Stockholm in 1994 and now lives and works between Great Britain and her homeland
- Brita Hagberg (1756–1825), Swedish soldier
- Brita Hazelius (1909–1975), Swedish breaststroke swimmer who competed in the 1928 Summer Olympics
- Brita Horn (1745–1791), Swedish countess and courtier
- Brita Johansson (born 1941), Finnish athlete
- Brita Klemetintytär (1621–1700), Finnish postmaster
- Brita Koivunen (1931–2014), Finnish schlager singer
- Brita Lindholm (born 1963), Swedish curler
- Brita Nordlander (1921–2009), Swedish teacher and politician
- Brita Olofsdotter (died 1569), Finnish soldier of the Swedish cavalry
- Brita Olsdotter
- Brita Persdotter Karth
- Brita Pipare
- Brita Rosladin (1626–1675), Swedish noblewoman
- Brita Ryy (1725–1783), Swedish educator
- Brita Sailer
- Brita Scheel (1638–1699), Danish noblewoman
- Brita Sigourney (born 1990), American freestyle skier
- Brita Snellman (1901–1978), Swedish architect
- Brita Sofia Hesselius (1801–1866), Swedish daguerreotype photographer
- Brita Sophia De la Gardie (1713–1797), Swedish noble and amateur actress
- Brita Tott
- Brita Zippel (died 1676), Swedish witch
- Brita von Cöln
- Brita von Horn (1886–1983), Swedish novelist, dramatist, director
- Brita Öberg (1900–1969), Swedish actress

== Places ==
- Brita-Arena, Wiesbaden, Germany

== Other ==
- 1071 Brita, asteroid
- Brita (company), German manufacturer of water filters
- SS Brita (1908), cargo ship
