= Woxen =

Woxen is a Nordic surname. Notable people with the surname include:

- Einar Woxen (1878–1937), Norwegian barrister and journalist
- Greta Woxén (1902–1993), Swedish civil engineer
- Harald Woxen (born 2008), Norwegian footballer
