= Elisa Servenius =

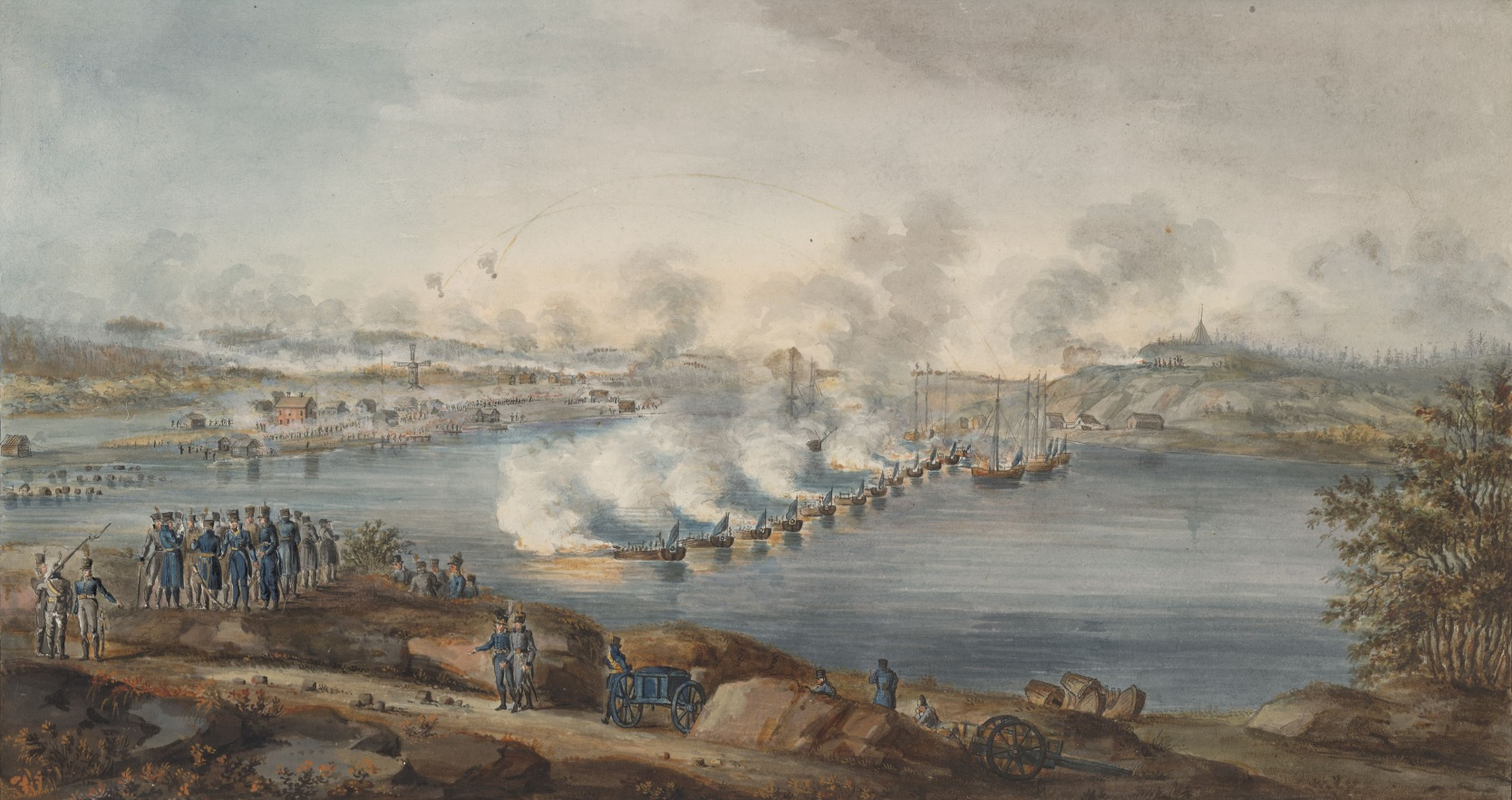
Ratan battle

Elisa Servenius (née Bernström; fl. 1810), also known as Johanna Servenius, was a woman who served in the Swedish army dressed as a man during the Finnish War between Sweden and Russia 1808–1809. She was decorated for bravery in battle, and was the first and only woman in Sweden awarded the För tapperhet i fält for bravery in battle on land, while Brita Hagberg and Anna Maria Engsten were decorated for bravery at sea.

== Service ==
Elisa Servenius, a maid, met the soldier Bernard Servenius when his regiment was stationed in Stockholm. They fell in love and were married, and when the regiment left for war she disguised herself as a man and enlisted as a soldier in the regiment herself: "as she had decided to live and to die with her husband". This regiment was either the King's lifeguard (livgardet) or the Queen's regiment (drottningens livregemente).

Her husband was believed killed in action at the Battle of Ratan and Sävar, while she herself collected the ammunition of the enemy and gave it to her fellow soldiers during the battle. For this action Gustav Wachtmeister recommended that she be decorated for bravery in battle. During the march to Piteå, when for the third time she prepared to "in her ability serve her country", her gender was discovered and she was fired.

Elisa Servenius is mentioned in the famous memoirs of the queen, Hedvig Elisabeth Charlotte, who wrote in her diary: "Speaking of the latest expedition to Västerbotten, I forgot to mention, that an amazon appeared on the battlefield# Wachtmeister informed the queen of the case in a report, in which he asked her to provide Servenius with an economic gift, as Servenius was a member of the Queen's own regiment.

In the report to the queen, this version was given: Servenius hid in the boat which took the regiment of her husband away. She was discovered, but allowed to remain despite her sex. At Ratan, she marched at her husband's side dressed in a uniform, nursed the wounded, collected the ammunition from the fallen and handed it to her fellow soldiers during the battle. Her husband was reported dead, but she was convinced he was alive and a prisoner, and followed the army to Piteå in a new regiment. During this expedition, her biological sex was discovered by her new comrades. Officers, who knew her from the earlier expedition, informed admiral Johan af Puke and recommended that she should be spared from further inconvenience. Puke informed himself of her conduct during the battle at Ratan and decided to award her with the medal for bravery in battle.

Wachtmeister described Servenius to the queen as a former kitchen maid, with "energetic, expressive eyes, vivid in her ways and appearance, and even intelligent, so much so as one could ask from a person of her class", and that she "made herself noted with a natural fearlessness before danger" When asked, if she was afraid during the firing on the battlefield, she had replied:

Why would I be? I am with my husband, for him I would do anything, and also, I wish to help the wounded. I ask nothing more than to do it again, if needed; I do not mind the flying of the bullets the least bit, you will die someday anyway, this way as well as another.

The queen was impressed with her, and commented: Truly a philosophic way of reason from a woman of the people and a proof of wisdom as well as judgment.

After the war, it was discovered that her husband had been captured rather than killed in action. He was released from his Russian captivity in 1810, and they were reunited in Stockholm, after which they followed their regiment to Stralsund in Swedish Pomerania.

Servenius is not the only woman in Swedish history to have served as a soldier dressed as a man, but she is one of very few of these women who were officially recognized and decorated for such an act.

== Fiction ==
Servenius is portrayed in the novel Affairen vid Ratan by Björn Holm (2004), were the character "Katrin Servenius" is based on her.
