= Tzeltal Rebellion of 1712 =

Mayan rebellion in the Chiapas region of New Spain

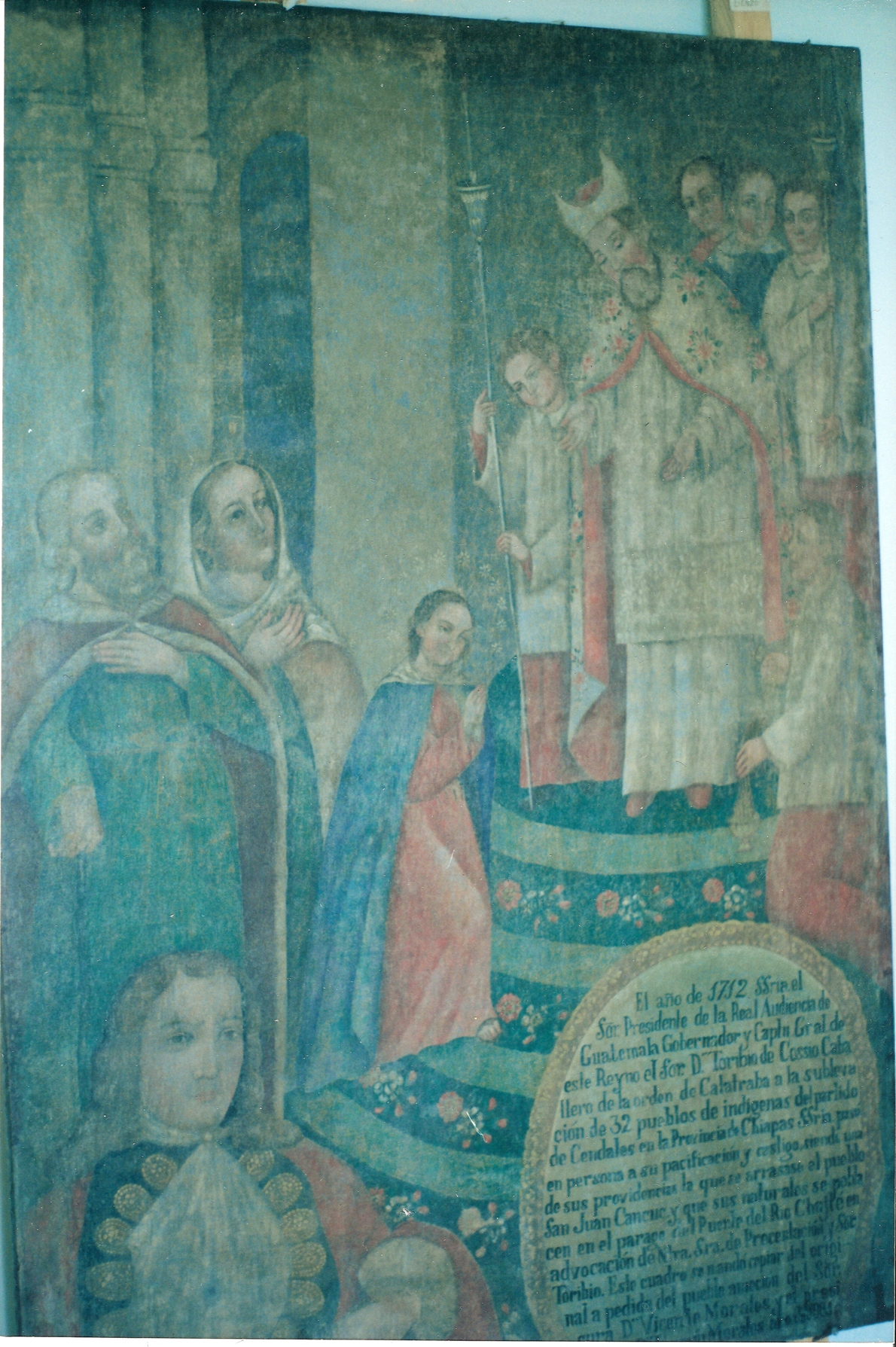
- Lienzo de la Presentación de la Virgen en el Templo, commissioned by Toribio de Cosío after the rebellion and preserved in San Juan Cancuc.
Date	June – 21 November 1712
Location	Highlands of Chiapas, Province of Los Zendales, Huitiupán Guardianía, and Coronas and Chinampas district, Alcaldía Mayor of Chiapas, Captaincy General of Guatemala
Result	Spanish victory

Belligerents
The "Soldiers of the Virgin" of Cancuc; Tzeltal, Tzotzil, and Ch'ol communities	Spanish troops of the Real Audiencia of Guatemala; Chiapan, mestizo, mulatto, and Afro-descendant auxiliaries

Commanders and leaders
María de la Candelaria; Sebastián Gómez de la Gloria; Nicolás Vázquez de Bachajón	Toribio de Cosío; Nicolás de Segovia

Strength
Up to 5,000 "Soldiers of the Virgin", according to contemporary sources	Several hundred regular soldiers and auxiliaries; reinforcements from Guatemala and Tabasco

Casualties and losses
Hundreds killed and wounded; subsequent executions and punishments	200 wounded in the capture of Cancuc, according to contemporary sources

In 1712, a number of Tzeltal Maya communities in the Soconusco region of Chiapas rose in rebellion, in what is known as the Tzeltal Rebellion or Tzendal Rebellion. It was a multiethnic revolt, with 32 towns of Tzeltal (14), Tzotzil (15), and Chol (3) Indigenous peoples participating in it. The Indigenous renounced the authority of the Catholic hierarchy and established a priesthood of Indigenous men. There was widespread military mobilization of Indigenous men, who called themselves “soldiers of the Virgin.”

== Overview ==
Scholars have debated the origins of the conflict, but the causes are seen as increased labor and taxation demands when Indigenous populations were low, and when tribute in kind obligations were mandated to be in cash, forcing the Indigenous into the Spanish economy. The rebellion took on an explicitly religious and anti-Spanish character, which "did not demand reform and justice within the regime. Instead, they challenged Spanish sovereignty, the clergy, and religious legitimation." Local populations believed that the Virgin Mary had miraculously appeared to a young, married, Indigenous woman, María de la Candelaria, outside the community of San Juan Cancuc. According to María, the Virgin Mary had asked that a chapel be built in her honor. The local priest, Father Simón García Lara doubted the miracle and had the Indigenous who believed in it whipped. Since the people of Cancuc wished the cult to be recognized and had not found that approval by the local priest, they sought out the bishop and sent a delegation to Ciudad Real. The bishop imprisoned most of them, but some escaped to tell of the mistreatment. An Indigenous man, Sebastián Gómez de la Gloria, came to Cancuc from nearby Chenalhó and declared the solution to the problem of non-recognition of the Virgin’s cult by the Catholic hierarchy was to create an Indigenous religious hierarchy. The various Indigenous towns raised military units, which were organized along a similar hierarchy to Spanish colonial units. They targeted the local Spanish population, wiping out Spanish troops, killing Spanish children, and carrying off the Spanish women as concubines. The Spanish women were forced to dress in Indigenous attire and perform manual labor, such as grinding corn. Following the defeat of the revolt in 1713, these Spanish women were brought before the Mexican Inquisition and questioned intensively. The Spanish military forces defeated the Indigenous soldiers of the Virgin. The town of “Cancuc was obliterated and its inhabitants moved to other towns.” The Spanish authorities had been alarmed at the size and the direction the rebellion had taken, a coordinated, multiethnic revolt that defied Spanish civil and ecclesiastical authority, necessitating a major military response. “The defeat of the revolt was so thorough that it left the province devastated and in deeper poverty.” The Spanish executed nearly a hundred participants and those who escaped were relentlessly pursued over years.

== Legacy ==
In Cancuc, the Lienzo de la Virgen is preserved. It was commissioned by Toribio de Cosío to be painted immediately after the pacification, with the explicit purpose of ensuring that the rebellious communities would not forget their defeat; the canvas, which iconographically depicts the Presentation of the Virgin in the Temple, has over time become an object of local devotion rather than a monument to punishment. Bricker showed that some ritual elements of the Carnival of San Juan Chamula incorporate the 1712 rebellion into a broader dramatic repertoire that includes the sixteenth-century conquest, the French intervention of 1862–1867, and the Chamula uprising of 1869, suggesting a living social memory of the conflict in the neighboring Tsotsil communities.

In literary culture, Viqueira published in 1993 María de la Candelaria, india natural de Cancuc, a text he himself described as an "attempt at a novel", which recreates the historical figure of the prophetess of Cancuc from a fictional perspective grounded in the sources. The Chiapas playwright Alfredo Palacios Espinosa premiered the play Los agravios de su ilustrísima in 1993 at the Teatro de la Ciudad Emilio Rabasa in Tuxtla Gutiérrez, focusing on the figure of Bishop Juan Bautista Álvarez de Toledo and ecclesiastical abuses preceding the rebellion. In 2006, filmmaker Antonio Coello published the screenplay Los embustes de San Tanás. Tragicomedia de una rebelión indígena, the result of a decade of fieldwork and research in the Archivo General de Indias, in which the character of Juan López—"Jwan Lopes", a rebel captain remembered in the oral tradition of Cancuc—plays a central role. In 2008, Guatemalan writer Ronald Flores published the historical novel La rebelión de los zendales, based on Ximénez's chronicle and intended to situate the uprising within the Central American context.

== See also ==
- List of Indigenous rebellions in Mexico and Central America
