= Fernig sisters =

French women who fought during the French Revolutionary wars

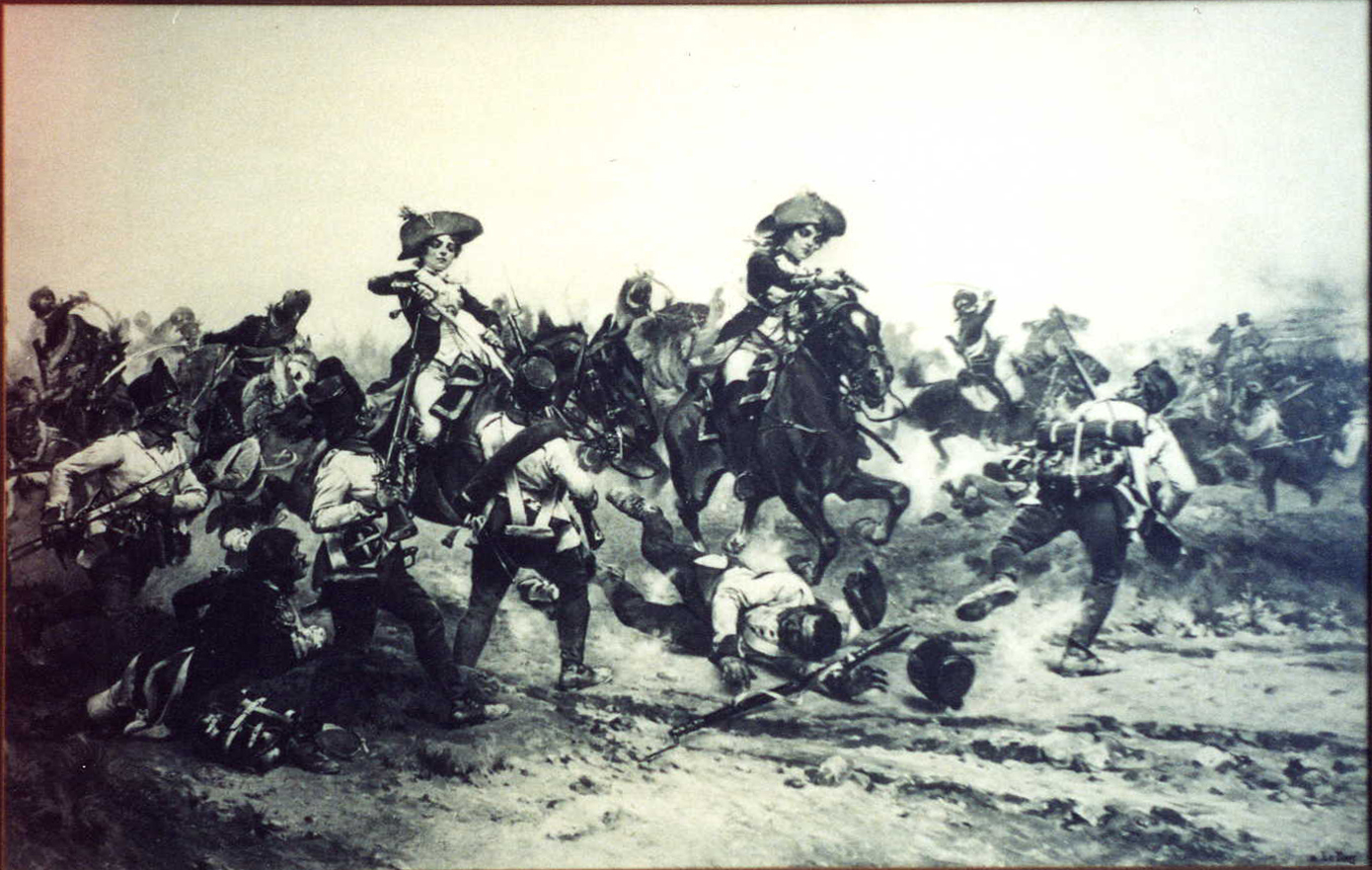
Depiction of the Fernig sisters

Félicité Fernig (1770–1841) and Théophile Fernig (1775–1819), known as the Sœurs Fernig (Fernig sisters), were two sisters who dressed as men and enlisted in the French Revolutionary Army during the French Revolutionary Wars. They were allowed to remain in service after their sex was discovered and became celebrities who were frequently mentioned in the contemporary French press.

== Biographies ==
Félicité and Théophile were born to Marie Adrienne Bassez and Sergeant François Louis Joseph Fernig, who served in the cavalry and educated his daughters in the use of weapons. When the Austrians invaded France in 1792, the sisters dressed as men, enlisted in the army, and were admired for their courage. When their sex were discovered, they were allowed to remain in service, which happened in at least some cases during this period.

They participated in the Battles of Valmy, Jemappes, Anderlecht, and Neerwinden. The sisters were appointed aides-de-camp under General Charles François Dumouriez. However, after Dumouriez's defection to Austria in 1793, the sisters were sentenced to exile despite their pleas that they had taken no part in his betrayal. Their exile was retracted in 1802 and they settled in Brussels, where Félicité married Captain François Joseph Herman Van der Wallen.
