= Brita Hagberg =

Swedish female soldier (1756–1825)

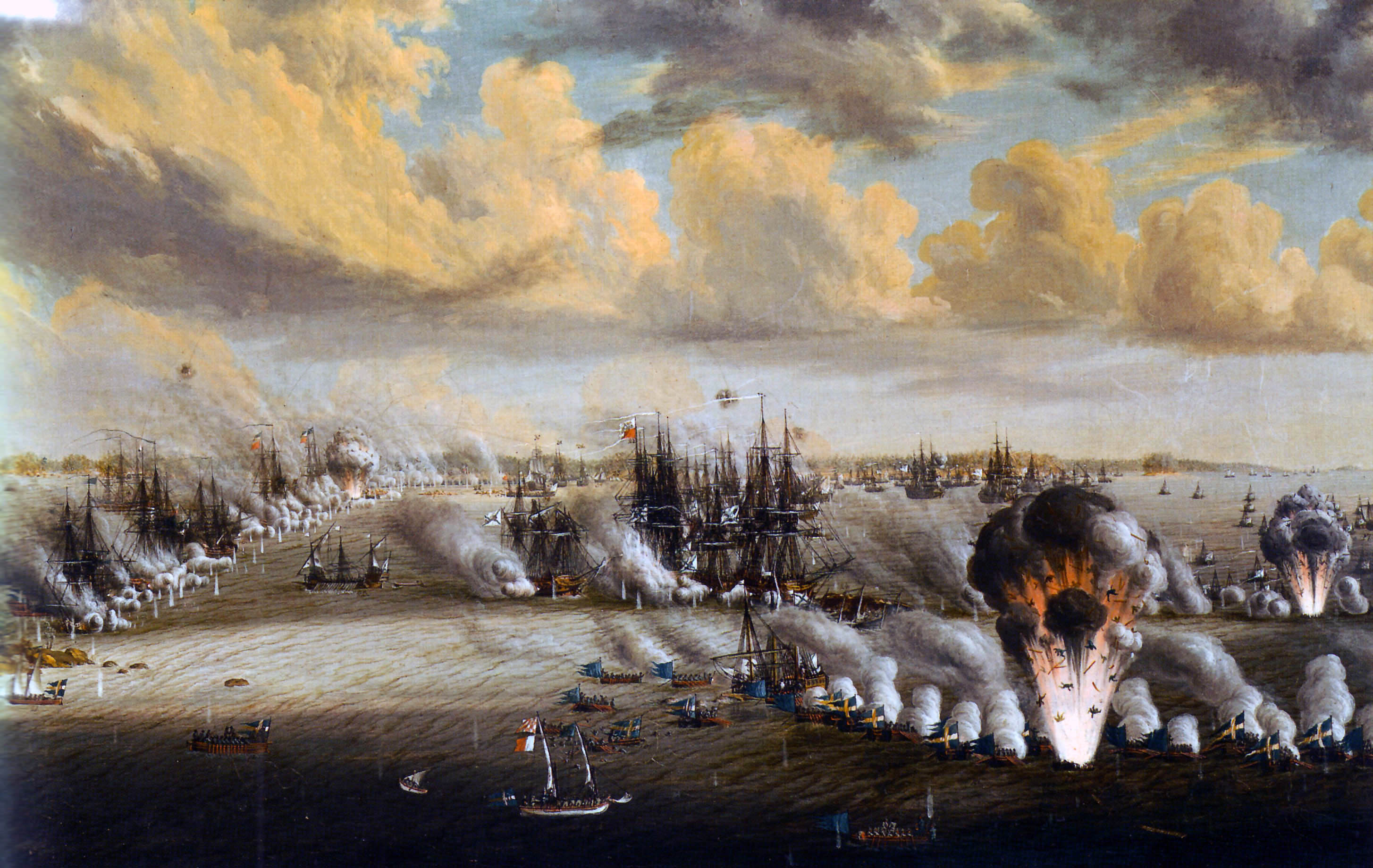
The Battle of Svensksund

Brita Christina Hagberg (née Nilsdotter; c. 1756 – 19 March 1825), alias Petter Hagberg, was a woman who served as a soldier in the Swedish army during the Russo-Swedish War (1788–1790). She is one of two confirmed women to have been decorated for bravery in battle in Sweden before women were allowed into the military in the 20th century.

== Biography ==
Hagberg is believed to have been born in Finnerödja. She arrived in Stockholm in 1777, where she married Anders Peter Hagberg (1753–1816), a soldier of the guard, in 1785. Her husband was called to serve in the war in 1788. She enlisted in the army dressed as a man under the name Petter Hagberg in search for her husband, because she had heard nothing of him since the beginning of the war.

=== War service ===
She participated in the Battle of Svensksund (1790) and in the Battle of Vyborg Bay as a marine soldier. At this battle, there was "at least one woman in a fighting position", and that was Hagberg. She was stationed to serve on the ship Styrbjörn. According to a story, Admiral Kurt von Stedingk once called out for "Hagberg", and at this call, two soldiers reported to him; one was Hagberg, and the other was her husband. They kept her sex a secret, and this is known from her own words many years later. It was said that several of the soldiers who received medals for bravery in battle after having served in the Swedish army in the wars of 1788–1790 and the Finnish War of 1808–1809 were discovered to have been women disguised as men. Hagberg was one of these women.

She was not the only woman to have distinguished herself in the war of 1788–1790. A maid from Färnebo in Västmanland, Anna Maria Engsten, the maid Major P. H. Scharff, distinguished herself at the same occasion in 1790; when the ship she travelled on was evacuated, she refused and stayed on, and singlehandedly steered the ship back to Sweden at night during Russian fire, for which King Gustav III gave her a pension and decorated her with the medal För tapperhet till sjöss for bravery. Hagberg and Engsten were the only two women confirmed to have received a decoration for bravery at sea; another woman, Elisa Bernerström, is confirmed to have received a medal for bravery in battle on land. A third woman, Dorothea Maria Lörsch, wife of officer Theslöf, took command over the ship Armida and directed it back from the battle after the officers of the ship had fallen, and for this, she was given the title of a Captain of the Swedish fleet.

Hagberg was later in her service wounded in battle at Björkö Sund, and was ordered to go below deck to have her wounds tended to. She was unwilling, but was forced to obey this order, and thus, her gender was revealed. Hagberg was given a military pension of three riksdaler a year, also something which was a very rare thing for a woman to receive. She was recommended for the pension by Carl Olof Cronstedt.

=== Later life ===
After the war, Hagberg was given a månglerska-permit to trade in food in 1793, and she had a spot reserved for her at the square of Oxtorget in Stockholm (1802), which was renewed the last time in 1819. Her husband died in 1816. She had at least two children (at least, these are the only ones confirmed to have reached adulthood); a son born in 1792, and a daughter born in 1797.

In 1864, she was mentioned in a reference book about famous Swedish women in history. Here, it was said that;

"For about thirty years ago, on the Oxtorget square in Stockholm, one could see an old woman selling ginger-bread cookies on a stand with a medal of bravery on her chest. She had been married to a guardsman by the name of – if this is correct – Hagström, and found a life filled with loneliness after her husband had been called out to serve at the war of 1788. She therefore had herself enlisted in the navy dressed in the clothes of a man."

The name Hagström was a misspelling, and it would, counted from 1864, have been forty rather than thirty years ago. In 1828, the life of Brita Hagberg was celebrated in the poem "Fruktmånglerskan med Tapperhetsmedalj" (The fruit seller woman with a medal of bravery) by the female poet Euphrosyne, (Julia Nyberg) who tells the tale of the female soldier, who dresses herself as a man and enlists in the army in search of her husband. Brita Hagberg was not the only woman in Swedish history to have disguised herself as a man to serve as a soldier, but she may be the only one to have received a military pension for military service in an age where women were officially barred from military service, and is as such unique.

She died in Stockholm, and was given a military burial, which was probably unique for her time.

== See also ==
- Ulrika Eleonora Stålhammar
- Elisa Servenius
