= Greta Woxén =

Sweden's first female civil engineer

- Born: 12 July 1902
- Died: 9 May 1993 (aged 90); Lidingö
- Education: KTH Royal Institute of Technology
- Occupation: Engineer

Greta Anna Maria Woxén (née Westerberg; 12 July 1902 – 9 May 1993) was Sweden's first female engineer, graduating from the KTH Royal Institute of Technology in 1928.

== Early life ==
Greta Anna Maria Westberg was born on 12 July 1902 in Denmark. Her father Nils Westberg was an engineer and a collaborator of Swedish industrialist Gustaf Dalén.

== Education ==
Greta Westberg completed her secondary school education in 1920 and passed the studentexamen, the school-leavers' university entrance examination in Sweden.

She then began working at the Vattenfallsstyrelsen, a Swedish multinational power company owned by the Government of Sweden. After taking a short basic course in electrical engineering at work, she became interested in studying engineering. Her three brothers had studied at the KTH Royal Institute of Technology.

The KTH Royal Institute of Technology had opened its doors to women students in 1921, and Brita Snellman was the first woman to take advantage of this opportunity in the same year, studying architecture. Westberg was the first woman in Sweden to begin a master's degree in engineering when she entered KTH's department of electrical engineering in 1924. She was nicknamed "Electric Girl". (Vera Sandberg), who graduated from Chalmers University of Technology in 1917 with a bachelor's degree, is considered Sweden's first female engineer. Chalmers' courses at the time were shorter than that at KTH, and it took until 1937 before Chalmers became a technical college and was allowed to issue master's degrees). Brita Snellman graduated in 1924, the same year that Westberg began her studies, which meant Westberg was the only female technologist at the entire KTH for part of her time there. During her degree, she formed the Kvinnliga Teknologföreningen, the Women Technologists' Association, with two other women technologists, who started their courses later, one studying Architecture and the other Chemistry. She graduated from the KTH Royal Institute of Technology in 1928.

== Career ==
After graduating, Westberg quickly got a job at Elektricitetverksföreningen, the Swedish energy company, where she worked with operating statistics for just over a year. She married in 1929 and had to resign to raise her children. Once her children were grown, she returned to work in 1954 as a teacher of mathematics, physics and chemistry.

== Personal life ==
Greta Westberg married mechanical engineer Ragnar Woxén in 1929. He had also graduated in engineering in 1928, and later (1943–1964) became KTH's Rector. As early as 1927, the couple had edited and published Föreläsningar i läran om hiss- och transportanordningar, a collection of Lectures in the Doctrine of Elevators and Transport Devices. They had five children, Iva, Harald, Anna, Gerda and Gustav.

Greta Woxén died 9 May 1993 in Lidingö.

== Commemoration ==
A room is named after Greta Woxén at Kungliga Tekniska högskolan.
