= Anna Maria Engsten =

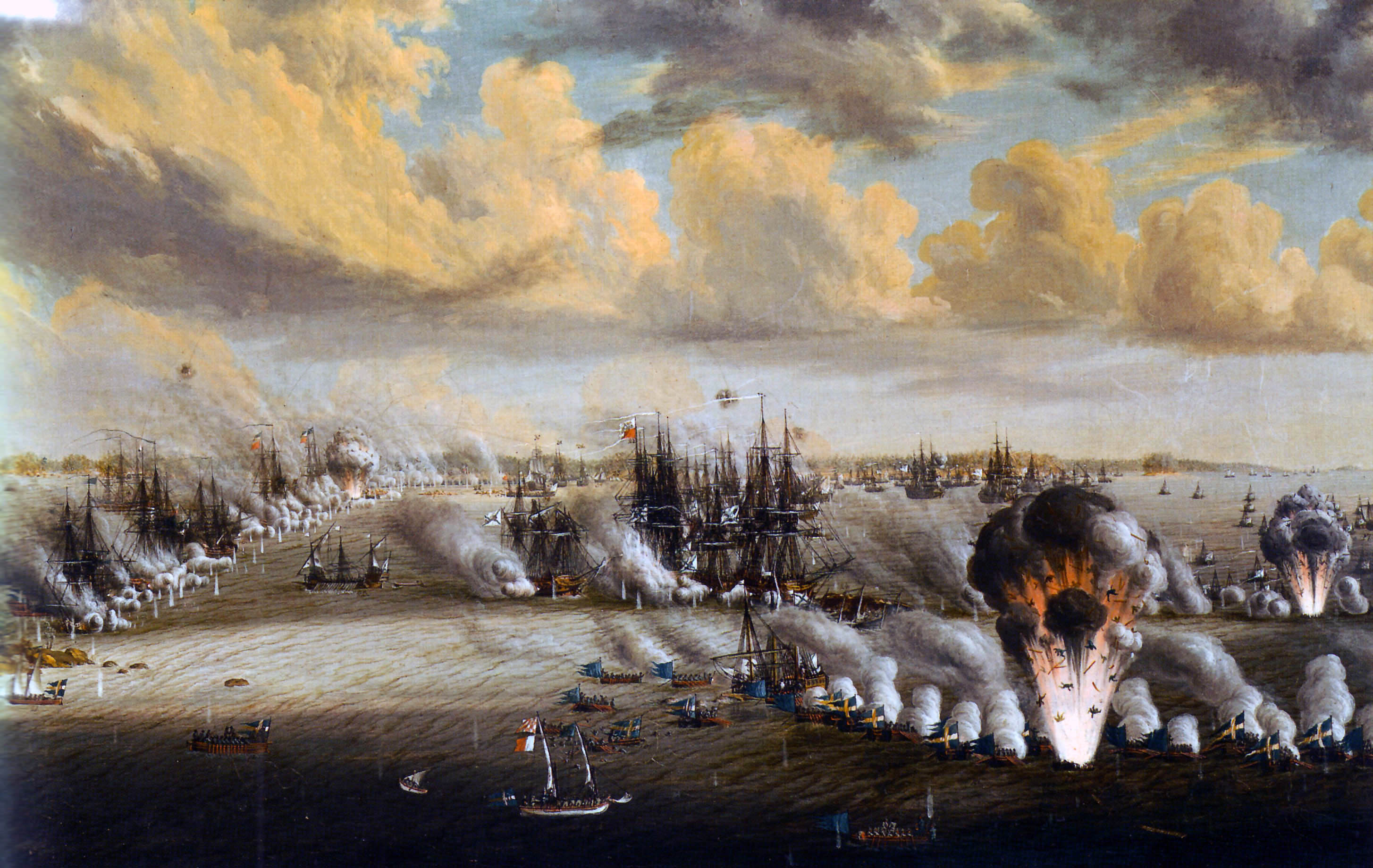
The Battle of Svensksund

Anna Maria Jansdotter Engsten (1764–1804) was awarded with a medal in silver for Valour in Battle at Sea by King Gustav III of Sweden for her acts during the Russo-Swedish war of 1788–1790.

Engsten was a maid to the master mariner of the Swedish fleet, G. A. Leijonancker. During the retreat from Viborg and Björkösund, she was evacuated with five sailors in a boat filled with food supplies and the captain's belongings. They were shot at by the Russian fleet, which killed a sheep and caused a leak. The sailors abandoned the boat, but she stayed behind, determined to steer the boat to safety. She did so singlehandedly, although the boat required at least two people to steer, a mission she succeeded with. This was confirmed by Major Scharff. When the King was told about this, he awarded her a medal in silver for Bravery in Battle at Sea as well as a sum of 50 riksdaler. This was paid out on 15 March 1791.

== See also ==
- Dorothea Maria Lösch
