= Mary Ralphson =

- Born: Mary Cameron; Inverlochy
- Died: 27 June 1808
- Military career
- Branch: cavalry
- Unit: 3rd Dragoons of the Kings Own Dragoons
- Conflicts: Battle of Dettingen, Battle of Fontenoy, Battle of Culloden, Battle of Lauffeld, Battle of Lauffeld

Mary Ralphson, née Cameron (d. 27 June 1808), was a British dragoon, known as Trooper Mary.

== Life ==
She was born in Inverlochy in Scotland, and married to Ralph Ralphson, who served in the 3rd Dragoons of the Kings Own Dragoons. She accompanied him when he left for the campaign in Europe to serve in the War of the Austrian Succession in 1741.

According to the legend, she came to participate in fighting when she found herself in the middle of a battle: "She equipped herself in the uniform and accouterments of a Dragoon who fell wounded by her side, mounted his charger and regained the battle line", and having participated once, she continued to serve. She participated in the Battle of Dettingen in Germany in 1743, the Battle of Fontenoy in the Austrian Netherlands in 1745, at Clifton, Falkirk and the Battle of Culloden in Scotland in 1746, and at the Battle of Lauffeld (Lawfeld, also called Val) in the Netherlands in 1747.

After the Battle of Lauffeld, she was widowed and left the army. She settled in Liverpool, where she lived on the support of charity.

== Sources ==
- Baudino, Isabelle; Carré, Jacques; Révauger, Marie-Cécile (2005). Isabelle Bauino, Jacques Carré, Cécile Révauger: The Invisible Woman: Aspects Of Women's Work In Eighteenth-century Britain. Ashgate. ISBN 9780754635727.
- Isabelle Baudino, Jacques Carré, Cécile Révauger: The Invisible Woman: Aspects of Women's Work in Eighteenth-century Britain (2005)
- Peter Craddick-Adams, Women at War: 'She-Soldiers' Through the Ages, BBC
- BBC History Magazine: The Celebrated Pedestrian and Other Historical Curiosities
- Women in battle. John Laffin Abelard-Schuman, 1967
- The Scots Magazine and Edinburgh Literary Miscellany, Volym 71
