= Einar Woxen =

Norwegian barrister and journalist

Einar Woxen, MBE (5 November 1878 – 12 November 1937) was Norwegian barrister and journalist.

He was born in Kristiania. He finished his secondary education at Aars og Voss in 1896 and took the cand.jur. degree in 1901. He worked in Mellem-Jarlsberg District Court from 1902 to 1905, and was a journalist in Aftenposten from 1906 to 1907. He continued a journalistic career as part-time foreign affairs journalist in Aftenposten between 1907 and 1920, Samtiden between 1913 and 1914 and Norges Handels- og Sjøfartstidende between 1920 and 1924. His main career was however in law. He was a junior solicitor from 1907 to 1914 and lawyer from 1914.

He was a board member of Samtrygd, Norsk Gjensidige Forsikringsforening from 1923, and advanced to deputy chair in 1930. From 1925 to 1931 he was the secretary of Oslo Handelsstands Forening, and from 1926 he was the secretary of Norske Gjensidige Brandkassers Landsforening. He was a supervisory council member of D/S A/S Ocean from 1917, and a council member of the Riksmål Society.

He was decorated as a Chevalier of the Legion of Honour and was Member of the Order of the British Empire. He died in November 1937.
