= Anna Colbjørnsdatter =

Anna Colbjørnsdatter Arneberg
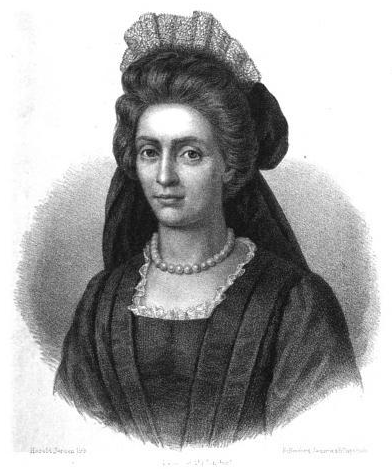
- Anna Colbjørnsdatter (Chr. Tønsberg: Norsk Portræt-Galleri, Christiania, 1877)
- Born: 1667
- Died: 1736 (aged 68–69)
- Conflicts: Great Northern War

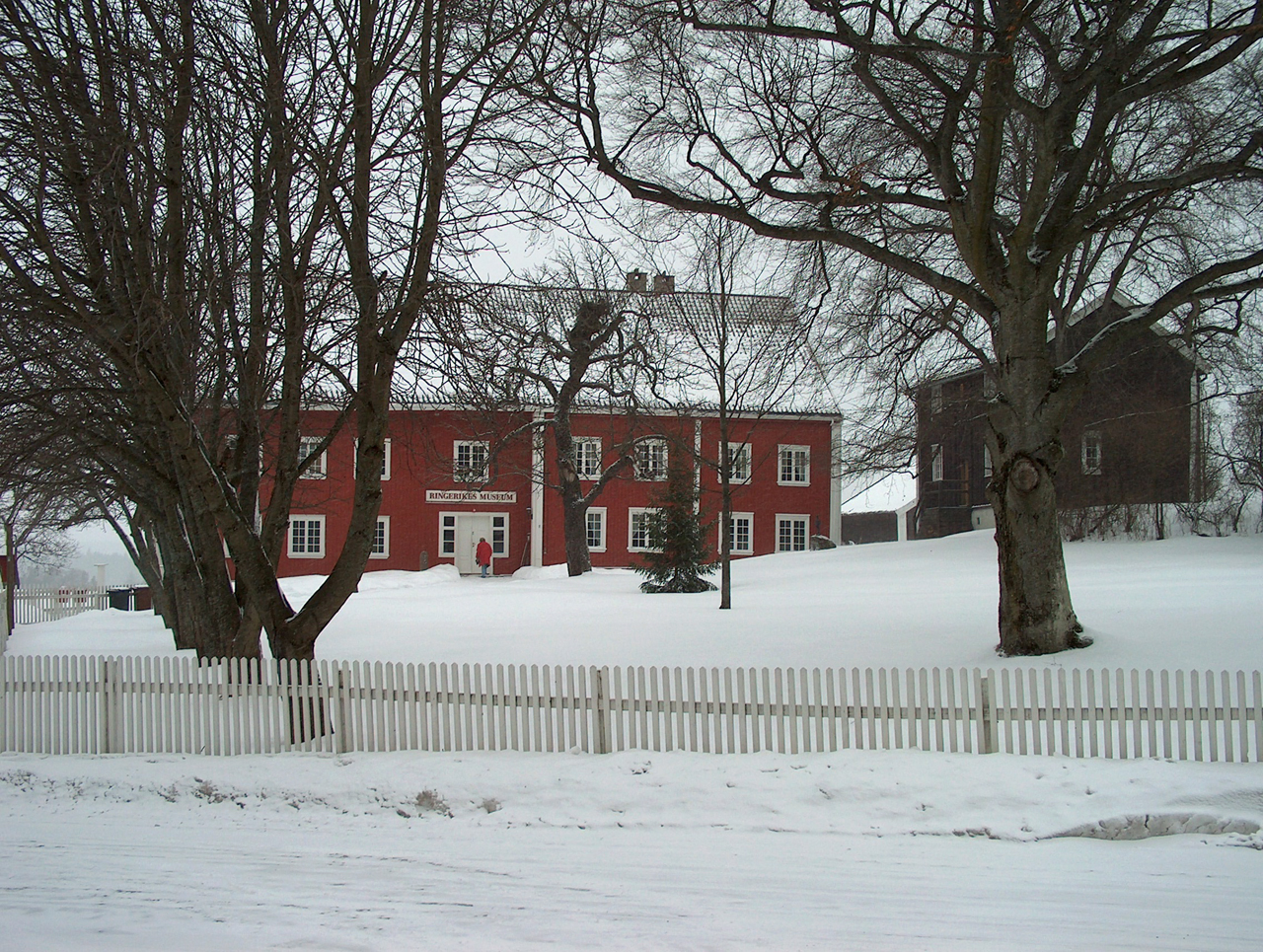
Norderhov Rectory now Ringerikes Museum near Hønefoss

Anna Colbjørnsdatter Arneberg (1667–1736) was a Norwegian national heroine who was most known for her participation in the Battle of Norderhov (slaget på Norderhov) during the Great Northern War.

Anna Colbjørnsdatter was born at the Sørum vicarage at Romerike in Akershus, Norway. She was the daughter of the vicar Colbjørn Torstensen Arneberg (1628–1720) and Catharina Kjeldsdatter Stub (1653–1731) and married the vicar Jonas Ramus (1649–1718) in 1682. Her spouse became a vicar at Norderhov Church (Norderhov kirke) in Ringerike in 1690.

Anna Colbjørnsdatter became known for her role in the skirmish at Norderhov between Norwegian-Danish and Swedish forces on 29 March 1716. During the Swedish siege of Akershus Fortress in Oslo in 1716, Charles XII of Sweden sent 600 soldiers under Axel Löwen to investigate whether they could surround the Norwegian defences. The Swedish troops had taken shelter in and by the old Norderhov Rectory (Norderhov prestegård). Anna Colbjørnsdatter received them friendly and kept them busy while she sent her son-in-law with a message to a nearby camp with 200 Norwegian soldiers. The Swedish force was taken by surprise and 130 of them captured. Reportedly she alerted the Norwegians to the presence of the troops of Charles XII of Sweden in the church yard at Norderhov, where they had taken shelter in and around the rectory. The event itself was first published by Peter Andreas Munch in his book, Norges, Sveriges og Danmarks Historie til Skolebrug (1838).

Her half-brothers, Hans Colbjørnsen (1675–1754) and Peder Colbjørnsen (1683–1738), were successful timber merchants in Fredrikshald. Both were active in leading the civilian resistance to the Swedish attacks of Fredrikshald during 1716 and 1718.

She is portrayed in the historical play Anna Kolbjørnsdatter by Rolf Olsen, written in 1853.

== See also ==
- Brita Olsdotter
- Maria Faxell
