= Julianna Géczy =

Hungarian noblewoman

- Korponay Jánosné garamszegi Géczy Julianna
- Born: c. 1680; Osgyán, Kingdom of Hungary
- Died: 25 September 1714; Győr, Kingdom of Hungary
- Cause of death: decapitation
- Other names: Jánosné Korponay
- Known for: controversial role in Rákóczi's War of Independence
- Movement: Kuruc
- Criminal charges: high treason
- Criminal penalty: death
- Criminal status: convicted
- Spouse: János Korponay
- Children: 1
- Parent(s): Zsigmond Géczy of Garamszeg; Judit Bakos of Osgyán

Julianna Géczy Korponayné (c. 1680 – 25 September 1714) was a Hungarian noblewoman known as the "white lady of Lőcse".

She became infamous as the traitor who let the imperial army into Lőcse during Rákóczi's War of Independence. She was executed in 1714 for her connection to an alleged new insurgence.

== Life ==
=== Early life ===
Julianna Géczy was born in Osgyán, Kingdom of Hungary around 1680 to Colonel Zsigmond Géczy of Garamszeg, member of an old Hungarian noble family and his wife Judit Bakos of Osgyán. In 1700, she married János Korponay, a trusted man of Count István II Koháry (1649–1731), military commander of the Habsburg army. Together, they had a son named Gábor.

=== During the War of Independence ===
When Rákóczi's War of Independence (1703–1711) broke out, Géczy's father quickly joined the Kuruc forces, but her husband defended the Castle of Csábrág against the insurgents. One of the commanders attacking the castle was Zsigmond Géczy, and Julianna Géczy wrote a letter to her husband, begging him to surrender. Finally, on 24 February 1704, he joined the uprising.

Between 1709 and 1710, Géczy lived in the town of Lőcse (present day Levoča, Slovakia), where she had an affair with Kuruc general István Andrássy (1650–1720). She played the role of intermediary between Austrian Lieutenant general Georg Löffelholz and the defenders of the castle, relaying messages. After some negotiations, Lőcse capitulated to the imperial army. The Kuruc periodical newspaper Mercurius Veridicus blamed "one frivolous woman" (Hungarian: "egyetlen ledér nőszemély") for the loss of Lőcse, alluding to Géczy.

=== Trial and execution ===
According to her testimony, after the end of the war, in March 1712, Géczy was given a letter by a mysterious pilgrim, who asked her to reply. She gave it to imperial general Viard. Soon after, she was approached by János Pelargus, and given a note and some letters. The note said that knowing her skills, they are asking her to relay the letters, which were from Prince Francis II Rákóczi and Major general Miklós Bercsényi. Géczy read the letters, which said that the secret followers of Rákóczi gathered at her father's house for consultation.

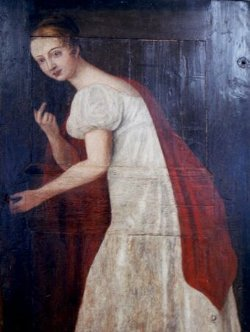
Painting of a lady with keys on the gates of the fortress of Levoča, thought to depict Géczy inviting in the imperial army. It is exhibited in the Museum of Fine Arts in Budapest.

Géczy went to Pozsony (present day Bratislava, Slovakia), where the Diet of Hungary was held, and told Palatine János Pálffy about the letters, who asked her to give them to him. However, there were news that Rákóczi returned from Poland, and Géczy became scared that he would take revenge on her for the betrayal. She also feared that the Viennese court would arrest her father for his involvement. She burned the letters and fled Pozsony, but while on her way, she wrote to Palatine Pálffy, telling him that she had burned the letters. Pálffy had Géczy arrested, and imprisoned her in the Castle of Vöröskő. She barely had time to warn her father and husband, and Zsigmond Géczy fled the country.

Géczy's allegations about the letters and the plans of a new insurgence angered both the imperial court and the noblemen of the diet, who were trying to hold Emperor Charles VI to the promises of the Treaty of Szatmár (1711). She was interrogated by torture and sentenced to death after a three-year-long trial. She was beheaded on 25 September 1714 in the main square of Győr.

== Literary afterlife ==
Julianna Géczy became infamous as the traitor who let the imperial army into Lőcse, after famous Hungarian writer Mór Jókai (1825–1904) portrayed her as such in his romantic novel The White Lady of Lőcse (Hungarian: A lőcsei fehér asszony) in the 19th century.
