= Kari Hiran =

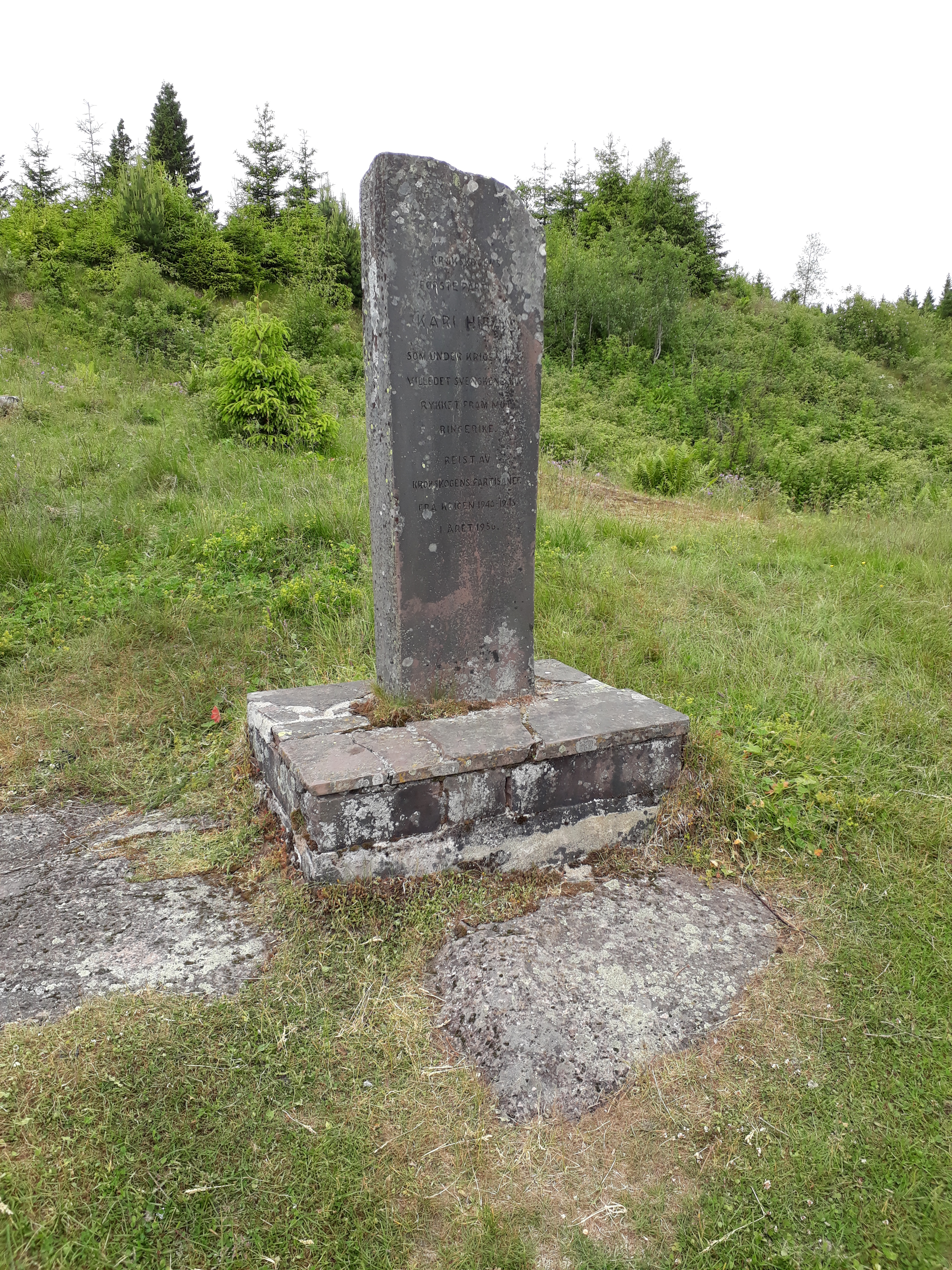
Kari Hiran memorial

Kari Rasmusdatter Hiran (fl. 1716), was a Norwegian farmer and war heroine. She is known for her act during the invasion of Norway by Charles XII of Sweden during the Great Northern War in 1716. She gave the Swedish army false information about the size and plans of the Norwegian army, which evidently caused the Swedish monarch to interrupt his attempt to conquer Norway and return to Sweden. A memorial stone was raised for her in 1956.

== See also ==
- Brita Olsdotter
