= Brita Olofsdotter =

Finnish soldier of the Swedish cavalry

- Military career
- Allegiance: Sweden
- Branch: Swedish Army
- Unit: Swedish cavalry

Brita Olofsdotter (died fl.1569 CE), was a Finnish soldier of the Swedish cavalry. She is the likely first confirmed female soldier in Sweden, as well as the first confirmed Swedish example of the historical phenomena of women impersonating men to gain access to professions barred to their gender.

Olofsdotter was from Finland and was the widow of Nils Simonsson. She dressed as a man and enlisted during the Livonian War, where she served in the cavalry and was killed in battle. On 16 June 1569, John III of Sweden ordered Gabriel Christiensson to investigate the matter, and gave the order that her remaining salary should be paid to her family.
