= Maria Faxell =

Maria Faxell, née Caméen (1678-1738), was a Swedish vicar's wife who, according to legend, averted a Norwegian attack in Sweden during the Great Northern War.

Maria Faxell was the daughter of Benedictus Svenonis Caméen and Christina Carlberg and the sister of the ennobled Erland Caméen. She married Sveno Erlandi Faxell (1661–1728), the vicar of the Köla parish in Värmland at the border of Norway, in 1695.

In the 1710s, during the war between Sweden and Denmark–Norway, a Norwegian troupe passed the border into Sweden and was observed at the farm Gryttve by Köla church in Värmland. The vicar was away, and panic erupted in the parish. Faxell armed both male and female servants, placed them in strategic position around the parish and told them to give up war cries and fire shots and rung the bells, after which the Norwegians, according to the local legend, were frightened off believing there was a real Swedish army nearby.

== See also ==
- Brita Olsdotter
- Anna Colbjørnsdatter
