= Maria Úrsula de Abreu e Lencastre =

Portuguese adventuress and soldier (1682–1730)

Maria Úrsula de Abreu e Lencastre (1682–1730) was a Portuguese Brazilian adventuress and corporal in the Portuguese army. She was born in Rio de Janeiro, Portuguese Brazil and died in Goa. She joined the Portuguese navy dressed as a man under the name Balthazar do Couto Cardoso, sailed for Portugal, joined the army, and took part in battles in India.

In 1700, the year in which she turned eighteen years old, she left the house of her father and headed to Lisbon, the capital of the Portuguese Empire. Her idea was to live the adventures of Cavalry and Crusades that she had read from books, adventures that were forbidden to the women of her time. When she arrived at Lisbon, she enlisted herself as a soldier, with the false name of Baltasar do Couto Cardoso.

She served in the Portuguese army in Portuguese India dressed as a man in 1700–1712. She participated in the conquest of the fortress at Amona, Goa, against the Prabhu-Desais of Sanquelim, where she was promoted to captain and given charge of the fortress Madre de Deus 1703. She was decorated for her service by the king John V of Portugal in 1714. She revealed her sex voluntarily in 1714 because she wished to marry a man, Afonso Teixeira Arrais de Mello.

== See also ==
- List of wartime cross-dressers

== Sources ==
- Macedo, Joaquim Manuel de. Anno biographico brasileiro (v. 1). Rio de Janeiro, Typographia e Litographia do Imperial Instituto Artístico, 1876.
- Daehnhardt, Rainier. Homens, Espadas e Tomates. Ed. Zéfiro, 2005.
