= María de la Candelaria =

- Born: María López; 1698
- Died: 1716 (aged 17–18)

María de La Candelaria (c.1698 - d.1716) was a Tzeltal Maya woman and one of the leaders of the Tzeltal Rebellion of 1712.

== Life ==
Her father, Agustín López, was the sacristan of Cancuc in the district of Chiapas. In June 1712, María announced to the Tzeltal that the Virgin Mary had appeared to her with the request that a chapel be built in her honor. Prior to this announcement, the region of Chiapas had gone through two decades of social and political turmoil caused by poor harvests, repeated conflict among the Spaniards, one native rebellion, and a tribute system that was particularly burdensome on the Indians in the mountain regions. Following María's announcement, Cancuc's Dominican friar attempted to punish her and her father, as well as those who believed in the miracle of the apparition. But the Tzeltal inhabitants of expelled the friar and built the chapel, siding with María.

Over the following months, María López took the name María de la Candelaria.

The news of the Virgin's apparition spread through the Mayan region, drawing numerous indigenous people to the newly established chapel. On August 8, 1712, María de la Candelaria stood in front of the chapel and told a crowd that the Virgin had ordered the annihilation of the Spaniards and of other forms of Spanish authority, including all kinds of tribute, the clergy, the bishop, and the mayor.

Indigenous peoples from 32 communities, including the Tzeltal, Tzotzil, and Ch'ol rose up in a multiethnic rebellion against the Spaniards that lasted about three and a half months. Alongside Sebastian Gomez de la Gloria -a Tzotzil Indian man from Chenalhó who claimed to have risen to Heaven-, María de la Candelaria led the rebel army, appointed indigenous vicars to replace Spanish clergy, and preached the miracle of the apparition in churches of rebel towns.

On November 21, the Spaniards recaptured Cancuc. María de la Candelaria escaped with her father and other family members. Together they hid in a series of Tzotzil towns until they found permanent refuge in the forest of Chihuisbalam between the Valley of Huitiupán and Yajalón. About three years later, in February 1716, María de la Candelaria died in childbirth. Soon after her death, her family was discovered and captured by the Spaniards. During their trial, María's father admitted that the miracle of the apparition had been a ploy to overthrow the Spaniards in Chiapas.

In spite of her central role in the Tzeltal Rebellion, María de la Candelaria appears to have been forgotten by the native people of Chiapas. Modern accounts of this historical event focus on Juan López, a rebel captain.
