= Peder Colbjørnsen =

Norwegian businessman (1863–1738)

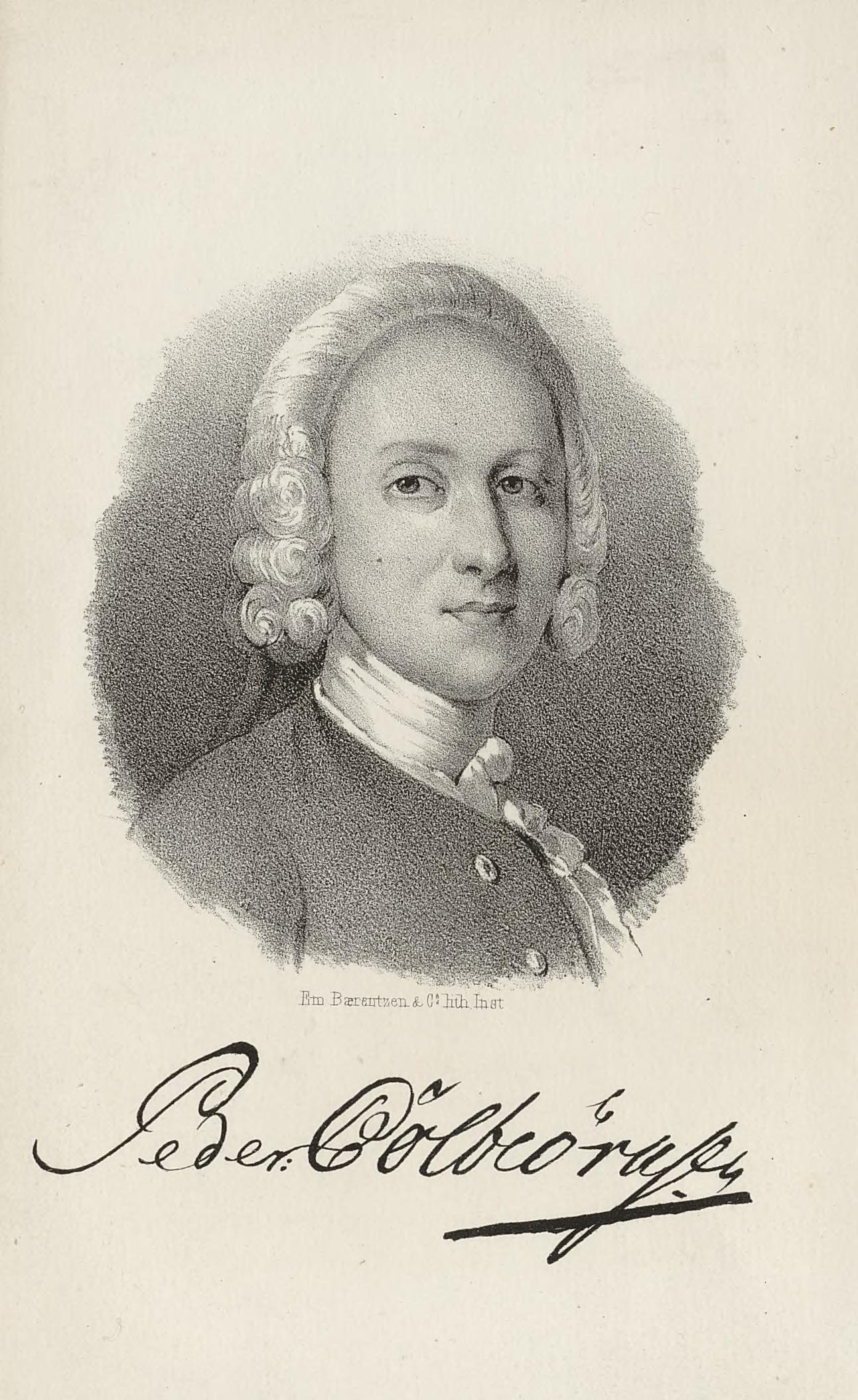
Peder Colbjørnsen

Peder Colbjørnsen (5 July 1683 – 17 March 1738) was a Norwegian timber merchant and war hero.

Colbjørnsen was born at the Sørum vicarage at Romerike in Akershus, Norway. He was the son of parish priest Colbjørn Torstensen Arneberg (1628–1720) and Catharina Kjeldsdatter Stub (1653–1731). He was a brother of Hans Colbjørnsen and half brother of Anna Colbjørnsdatter. The family later re-located to Fredrikshald, where his uncle Niels Kjeldsen Stub (1638–1721) had a significant lumber business. Peder came into the company and was in 1715 made his uncle's heir.

Peder Colbjørnsen was chief of the civilian resistance at Fredrikshald during the Great Northern War. He is known for his achievements at the battles in 1716 and 1718. A bust of Colbjørnsen, made by Hans Michelsen in 1856, is located in Halden.
