= Hans Colbjørnsen =

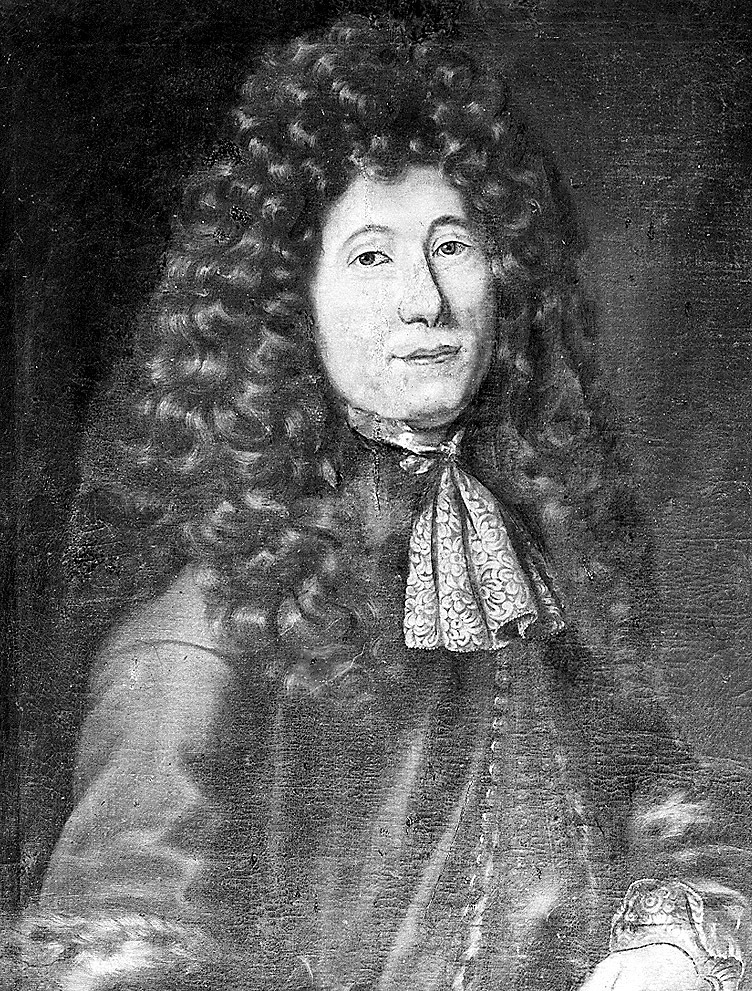
- Born: c.1675 Sørum, Norway
- Died: 1754 (aged 78–79)
- Occupations: Timber merchant Military officer
- Known for: Defense of Fredrikshald 1716–1718 of the Great Northern War
- Relatives: Peder Colbjørnsen (brother); Anna Colbjørnsdatter (half sister)

Hans Colbjørnsen (c.1675 – 1754) was a Norwegian timber merchant and military officer.

Colbjørnsen was born at the Sørum vicarage at Romerike in Akershus, Norway. He was the son of parish priest Colbjørn Torstensen Arneberg and Catharina Kjeldsdatter Stub. He was a brother of Peder Colbjørnsen, and half brother of Anna Colbjørnsdatter. Colbjørnsen was among the wealthiest residents in Fredrikshald. He established himself as a trader in the early 1700s, where his uncle Niels Kjeldsen Stub already had significant lands. Colbjørnsen entered a partnership with his brother Peder Colbjørnsen in the timber trade.

Both he and his brother are known for the defense of Fredrikshald during the Great Northern War. Peder Colbjørnsen was chief of the civilian resistance of Fredrikshald at the battles in 1716 and 1718. Colbjørnsen was appointed a lieutenant colonel of infantry by Christian VI of Denmark in 1733 and promoted to colonel in 1749 by Frederick V of Denmark.
