= Brita Olsdotter =

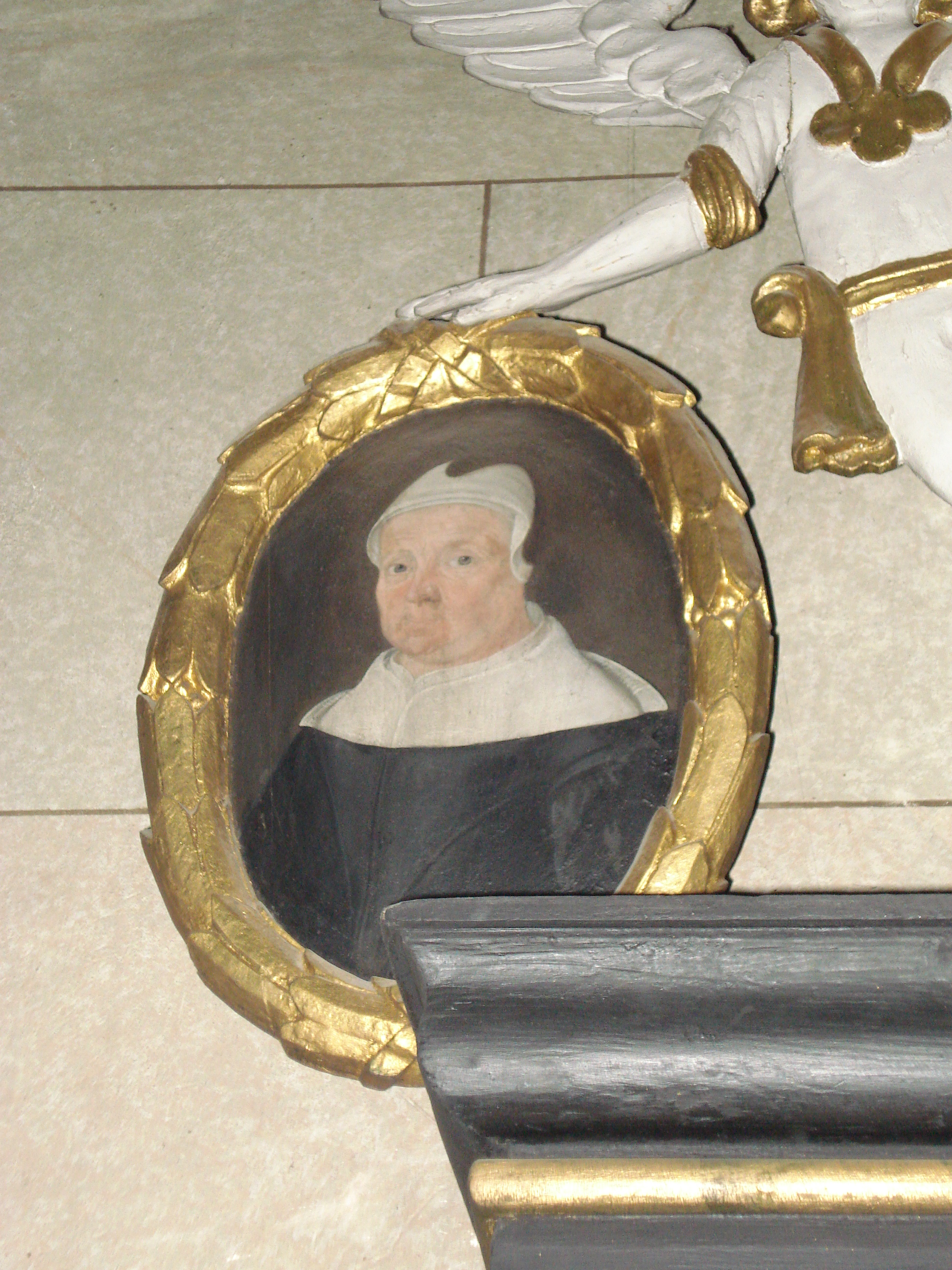

Brita Olsdotter (fl. 1719) was an old Swedish woman who, according to legend, saved the city of Linköping from being burnt by the Russians during the Great Northern War.

In 1719, in the last years of the war, Sweden was invaded by the Russian army which burned several cities and plundered villages along the coasts. A lot of stories are maintained which describe how some of the villages, churches and farms was saved by individual acts and personal courage.

During the Russian Pillage of 1719-1721, the Russian army burned Norrköping and then marched south towards Linköping to burn that city as well. On the way to Linköping, the Russian army met an old woman and apparently stopped to ask her something. She improvised a story and told them that a courier had arrived in Linköping with the message that the British fleet had come to Sweden's rescue, and that a Swedish army of 20,000 soldiers was on its way. This made the Russian army turn back and refrain from attacking the city. As a result, the city of Linköping, which was in fact without any protection at all, was saved from being burned.

There were a lot of such local legends. For example, the vicar's wife Maria Faxell was said to have armed her maids in Värmland, defending her parish against an attack from Norway. But Brita Olsdotter was, of all those, the person said to have saved the largest place from attack.

== See also ==
- Kari Hiran
- Anna Colbjørnsdatter
