= Battle of Anderlecht =

Battle of the War of the First Coalition

- Part of Flanders Campaign
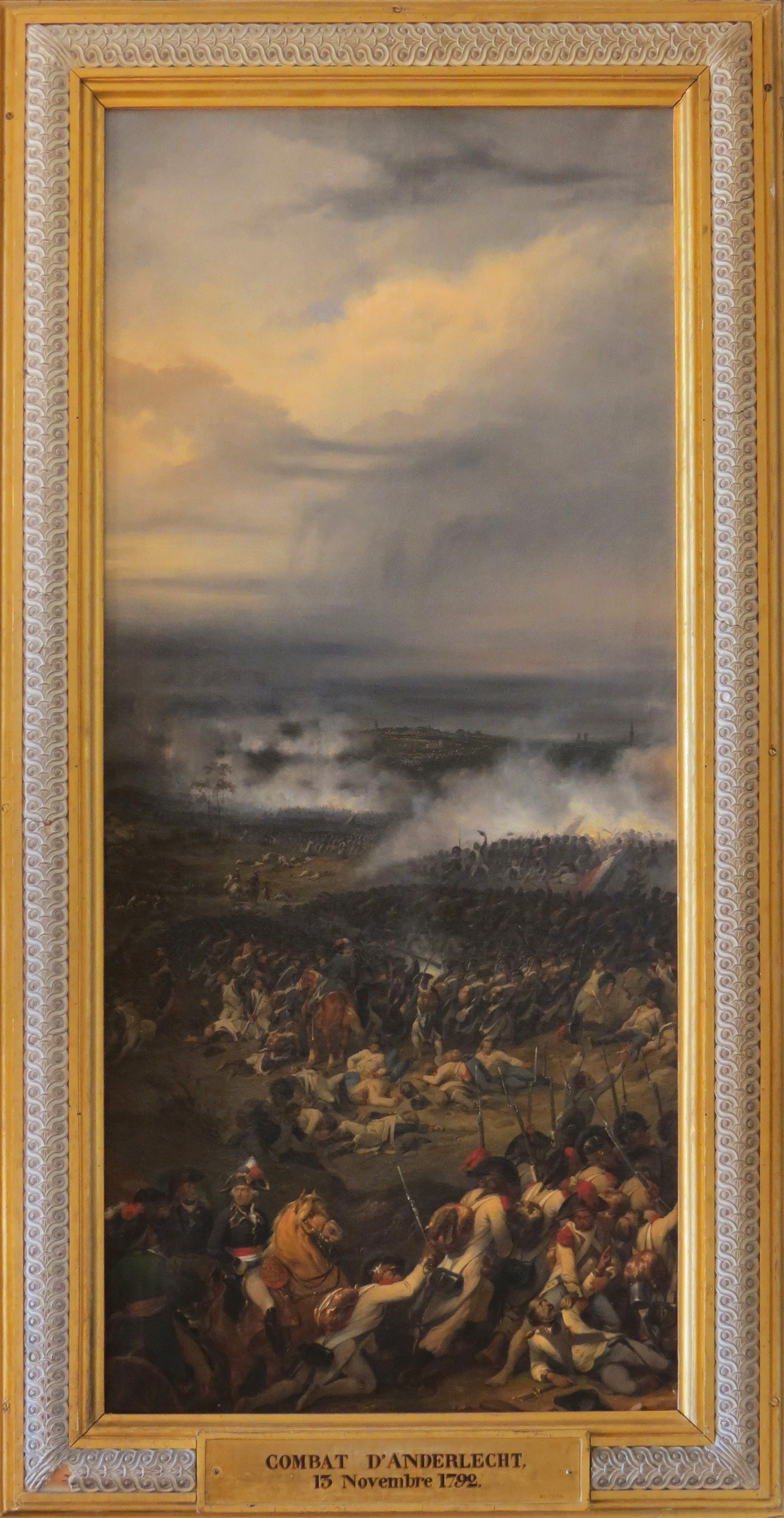
Date	13 November 1792
Location	Anderlecht, Brussels, Belgium 50°50′N 4°18′E
Result	French victory

Belligerents
(French First Republic) France	(Habsburg monarchy) Austria

Commanders and leaders
(French First Republic) Charles Dumouriez	(Habsburg monarchy) Frédéric Auguste

Strength
35,000 Infantry	20,000 Infantry

Casualties and losses
Unknown	500 Men, several cannons destroyed

The Battle of Anderlecht, sometimes referred to as the Fight of Anderlecht, took place in Anderlecht near Brussels, capital of the Austrian Netherlands (now Belgium). It was fought between the Habsburg monarchy and the French Republic on 13 November 1792, during the first year of the French Revolutionary Wars.

== Prelude ==
After the victory of Jemappes, the Imperial troops tried to delay the victorious march of the French Republic's troops. On 13 November 1792, the Austrian rear guard, commanded by Duke Ferdinand Frederick Augustus of Württemberg, met a French avant-garde commanded by Harville, Stengel, Rosières and Thouvenot, at Sint-Pieters-Leeuw, on the way to Brussels. The bulk of the French troops, commanded by Dumouriez, soon followed, pursuing the Austrians to the heights of Anderlecht.

== The Battle ==
The French Revolutionary Army commanded by Dumouriez, initially made up of 3,000 volunteers, launched an assault on the lines of the Duke of Württemberg, accompanied by 20,000 men, on the heights of Anderlecht. After a very lively cannonade and six hours of intense fighting, the French troops, bolstered by reinforcements that had crossed the Senne, eventually reached 35,000 volunteers. This forced the Imperial Army to retreat in disarray to Brussels, which they crossed during the night.

== Aftermath ==
The Imperial troops lost around 500 men on the battlefield and several pieces of artillery were destroyed. However, their cavalry, commanded by Maximilian Latour, managed to slow down the French pursuit and avoid heavier losses. The next day, 14 November 1792, Dumouriez entered Brussels to the cheers of the inhabitants. A number of Walloon soldiers also joined the French army.
