= Dorothea Maria Lösch =

Swedish military officer

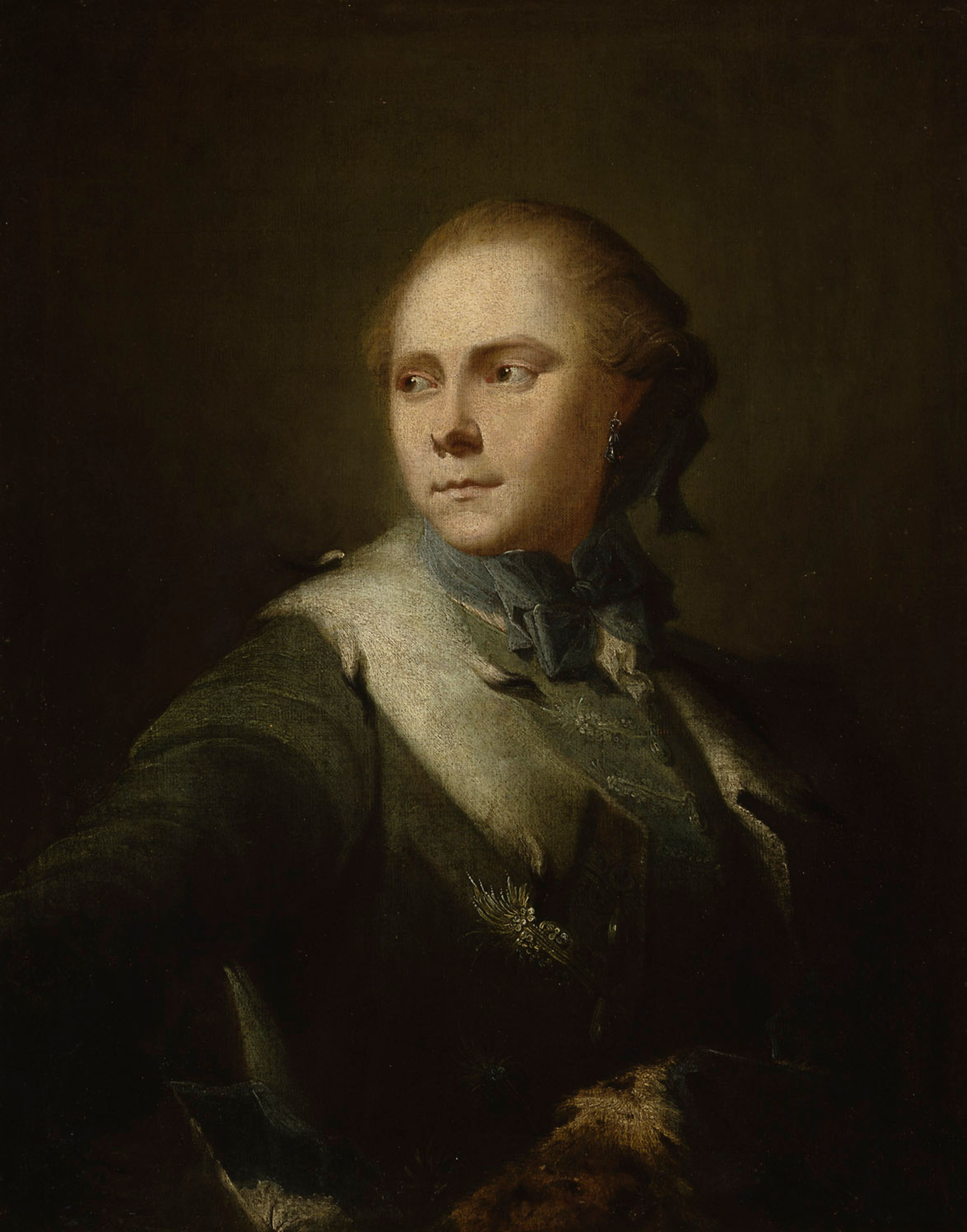
Dorothea Maria Lösch

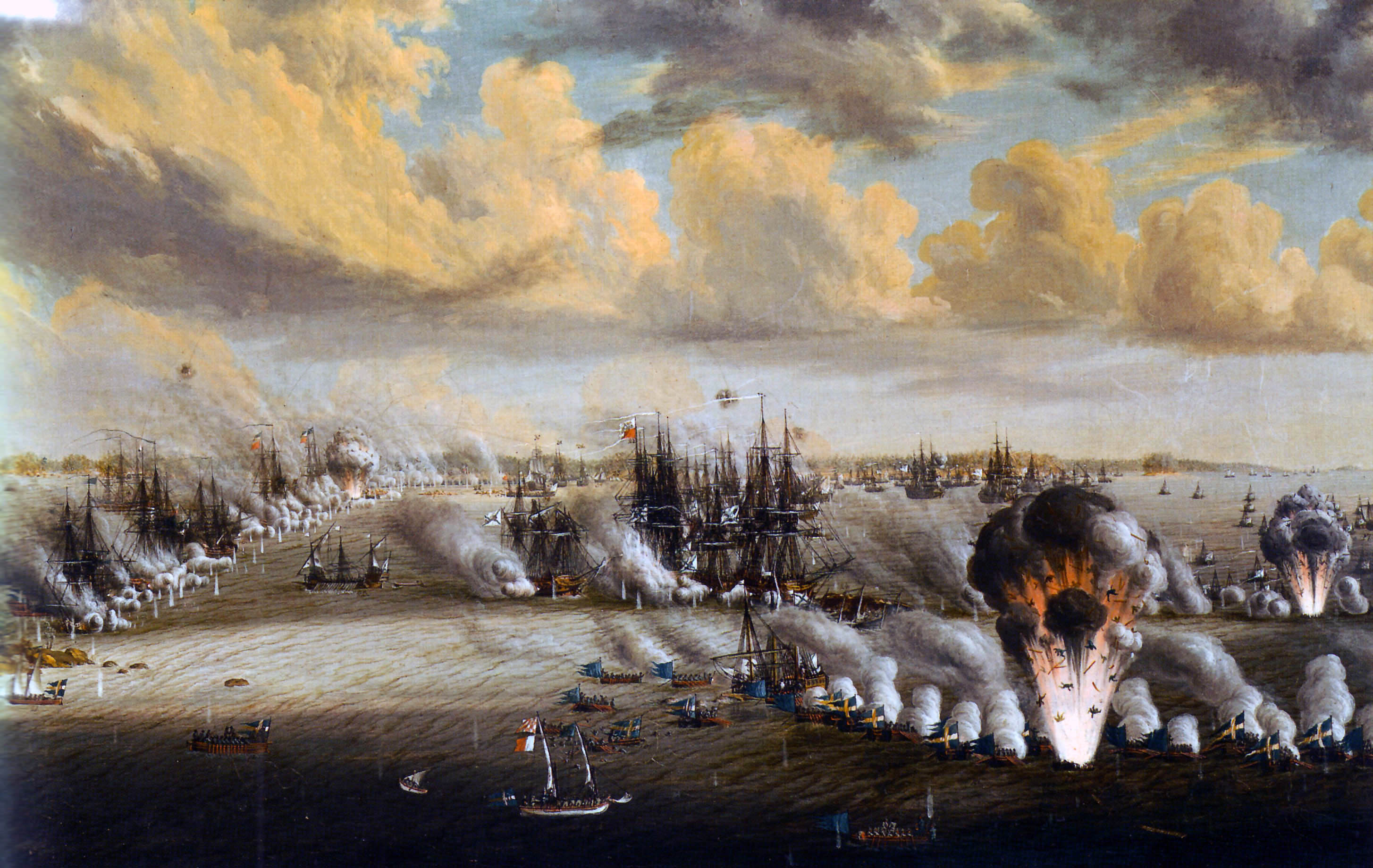
The Battle of Svensksund

Dorothea Maria Lösch (1730 – 2 February 1799) was a Swedish master mariner, known for the incident during the Russo-Swedish War (1788–1790) in which she commandeered a Swedish ship during a crisis. She was the first female in Sweden to be given the rank of Kapten in the Swedish Navy (approximately the equivalent of lieutenant commander in the British Navy). Her name has also been spelled Losch and Läsch.

Dorothea Maria Lösch was the daughter of the goldsmith Henrik Jakob Lösch from Stockholm and Dorothea Maria Beyms and married in 1756 to the Finnish sea captain Mårten Johan Thesleff: her spouse's name was also spelled Theslöf or Theslef. She had eleven children during her marriage. She was the author of a medical book of how to treat smallpox, Beskrivning af et bepröfvat medel emot Kopp-ärr (Stockholm, 1765).

Dorothea Maria Lösch took over and commanded the ship Armida to safety after its officers had been killed or abandoned it during the Battle of Svensksund on 9 July 1790. For this act, she was awarded with the rank of a master mariner of the Swedish fleet, something unique for a woman of this period. Although this was a purely honorary, ceremonial title, she was nevertheless the first woman in such a position.

== See also ==
- Brita Hagberg
- Margareta von Ascheberg
