= Brita Snellman =

Swedish architect

- Born: 21 May 1901; Stockholm
- Died: 9 June 1978 (aged 77); Stockholm
- Education: Royal Institute of Technology
- Occupation: Architect
- Spouse: Dag Ribbing
- Practice: Ragnar Hjorth; Dag Ribbing

Brita Snellman (later Ribbing; 21 May 1901 – 9 June 1978) was a Swedish architect. In 1924, she became the first woman to graduate in architecture as a regular student at the Royal Institute of Technology in Stockholm.

== Biography ==
Snellman obtained good results in drawing and mathematics in her school leaving examination after her schooling in the Stockholm district of Djursholm. As a result, her father, a bank manager, engaged Gunnar Asplund to introduce her to architecture. In 1920, she was admitted to the Royal Institute of Technology as a special student but the following year, after a change in the statutes, she was given the status of a regular student. In 1924, Snellman was the first woman to graduate in architecture under the new rules.

In August 1924, she was employed as an architect by Ragnar Hjorth (1887–1971). In 1925, she took up employment with the architect Dag Ribbing (1898–1980), whom she married. She later undertook commissions together with her son Lennart Ribbing (1927–1993).
