= För tapperhet i fält =

Swedish military medals

För tapperhet i fält & För tapperhet till sjöss
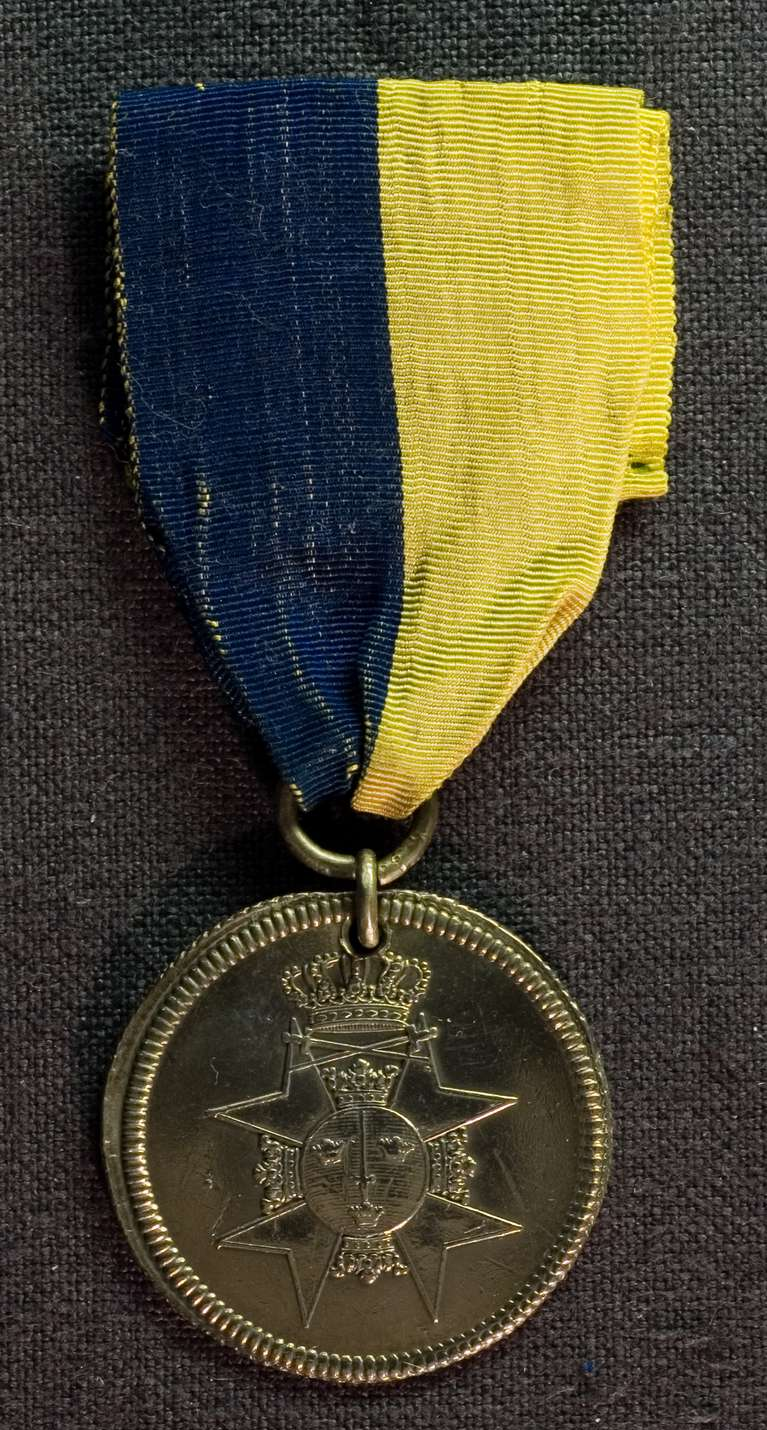
- The reverse of a För tapperhet i fält medal
- Type: Medal in gold or silver
- Awarded for: Valour in the field or at sea during acts of war
- Presented by: Sweden
- Eligibility: Swedish military personnel only
- Status: De jure still active, de facto inactive
- Established: 28 May 1789
- First award: 1789, Gustav III's Russian War
- Final award: 1915, Persia

Highlights
- Total: Unknown
- Ribbon of the medal

Precedence
- Next (higher): None (Order of the Sword up to 1974)
- Next (lower): None

För tapperhet i fält ("For Valour in the Field") and För tapperhet till sjöss ("For Valour at Sea") are two Swedish military medals awarded to officers and soldiers of the Swedish Armed Forces who have—as the medal names suggest—shown valour in the field or at sea in wartime. These two medals, along with the various grades of the Order of the Sword, are the only modern awards in Sweden in the category "Swedish war decorations" (Svenska krigsdekorationer). The medal was instituted by Gustav III on 28 May 1789, during his war against Russia and was meant to complement the Order of the Sword—which was instituted on 23 February 1748 and was awarded for the same purpose—valour in the field or at sea—but only to officers.

The original award was in silver and was intended for non-commissioned officers and privates only, but a version in gold was introduced in 1806, available only for higher-ranking officers. By royal letters on 24 March 1807 and 10 June 1809, it was decided that two different decorations be instituted, För tapperhet i fält (abbreviation Mtf) for valour in the field, and För tapperhet till sjöss (Mts) for valour at sea. Each of the two awards has a variant in gold (prefix G, for example GMtf) for officers and a variant in silver (prefix S, for example SMts) for NCOs and privates.

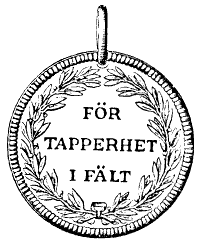
The obverse of a För tapperhet i fält medal.

The design is simple, a round medal, modern size 8 of the Swedish medal scale of 1773, called Mensura magnitudinis Nummorum, which is equal to a diameter of 31 mm. The obverse side shows the name of the medal, "FÖR TAPPERHET I FÄLT" or "FÖR TAPPERHET TILL SJÖSS" (or for older medals "[...] TILL SIÖS"), encircled by a wreath. The reverse side has since 1809 been decorated by the symbol of the Order of the Sword. Before that, the reverse carried a picture of Gustav III and the text "GUSTAV III SVERIGES KONUNG" ("Gustav III King of Sweden"). A band in blue and yellow has been issued with the awards since 1819.

De jure, the medal is still active and can be awarded to any Swedish soldier. However nobody has been awarded either of the two medals since 1915, when the last medal was issued to an officer serving with the Swedish Gendarmerie of Persia. Sweden has not been in a state of war since 1814, but the medal was awarded a few times between 1814 and 1915 nevertheless. Besides the previous mention, the medal was awarded another four times under the rule of Gustav V whose reign started in 1907, and it was also awarded in 1899 to at least one of the Swedish volunteers in the Second Boer War.

There has been some controversy regarding the fact that the medal has not been awarded since 1915. It has been argued that some of the Swedish soldiers that have served abroad on international missions should have been awarded the medal. One example is Furir Torsten Stålnacke who served with the United Nations in the Congo Crisis where, during a firefight, his lower jaw was maimed by gunfire, but still managed to drag and carry two of his shocked comrades as well as his Carl Gustav recoilless rifle into safety. He was not awarded the medal as the Swedish Armed Forces at the time only wanted to award the medal if Sweden was in a state of war, which they were not. This however is contrary to what had been done in the cases mentioned above, as Sweden was neutral during both the Second Boer War and during Gustav V's reign, when five medals were awarded.
