= Name of Australia =

Etymology of the name Australia

Australia
- Pronunciation: /əˈstreɪliə/
- Language: English

Origin
- Languages: Latin; Spanish
- Origin: Australis
- Meaning: Southern

Other names
- Variant forms: Straya; 'Straya
- Nicknames: Aust; Aus; Oz; Aussie
- Cognate: Austria

The name Australia (pronounced /əˈstreɪliə/ in Australian English) is derived from the Latin australis, meaning 'southern', and specifically from the hypothetical Terra Australis postulated in pre-modern geography. The name was popularised by the explorer Matthew Flinders from 1804, and it has been in official use since 1817, replacing New Holland, an English translation of the Dutch name, first given by Abel Tasman in 1643 as the name for the continent.

== History ==
The name Australia has been applied to two continents. Originally, it was applied to the south polar continent, or sixth continent, now known as Antarctica. The name is a shortened form of Terra Australis which was one of the names given to the imagined (but undiscovered) land mass that was thought to surround the south pole. The earliest known use of the name Australia in Latin was in 1545, when the word appears in a woodcut illustration of the globe titled Sphere of the Winds contained in an astrological textbook published in Frankfurt. In the nineteenth century, the name Australia was re-assigned to New Holland, the fifth continent. Thereafter, the south polar continent remained nameless for some eighty years until the new name of Antarctica was coined.

A Terra Australis (transl. land of the south) appeared on world maps from the 15th century, although it was not based on any actual surveying of such a landmass but rather on the hypothesis that continents in the Northern Hemisphere should be balanced by land in the south. This theory of balancing land is on record as early as the 5th century on maps by Macrobius.

The earliest recorded use of the word Australia in English was in 1625 in "A note of Australia del Espíritu Santo, written by Sir Richard Hakluyt", published by Samuel Purchas in Hakluytus Posthumus, a variation of the original Spanish name Austrialia del Espiritu Santo (transl. Southern-Austrian Land of the Holy Spirit) coined by navigator Pedro Fernandes de Queirós in 1606 for the largest island of Vanuatu, believing his expedition had reached Terra Australis. This is a rare combination of terms Austral and Austria, the latter in honour of the Habsburg dynasty that ruled Spain at the time. The Dutch adjectival form Australische was used in a Dutch book in Batavia (now Jakarta) in 1638, to refer to the newly discovered lands to the south. Australia was later used in a 1693 translation of Les Aventures de Jacques Sadeur dans la Découverte et le Voyage de la Terre Australe, a 1676 French novel by Gabriel de Foigny, under the pen-name Jacques Sadeur. Referring to the entire South Pacific region, Alexander Dalrymple used it in An Historical Collection of Voyages and Discoveries in the South Pacific Ocean in 1771.

The name Australia was specifically applied to the continent for the first time in 1794, with the botanists George Shaw and James Smith writing of "the vast island, or rather continent, of Australia, Australasia or New Holland" in their 1793 Zoology and Botany of New Holland, and James Wilson including it on a 1799 chart.

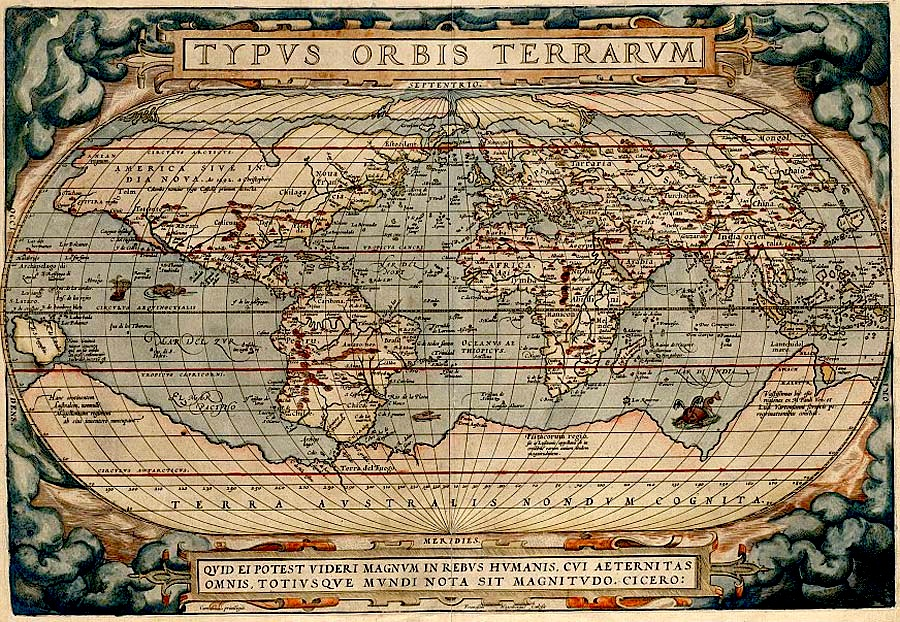
1570 map by Abraham Ortelius depicting Terra Australis Nondum Cognita as a large continent on the bottom of the map and also an Arctic continent

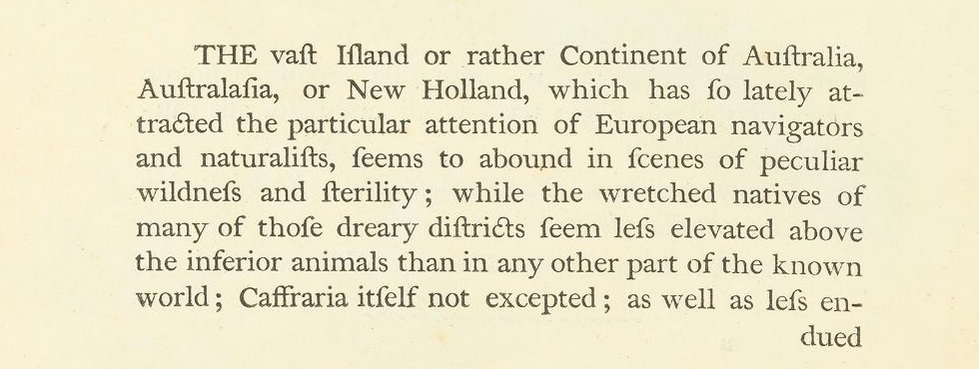
The name Australia was specifically applied to the continent for the first time in 1794.

The name Australia was popularised by the explorer Matthew Flinders, who pushed for it to be formally adopted as early as 1804. When preparing his manuscript and charts for his 1814 A Voyage to Terra Australis, he was persuaded by his patron, Joseph Banks, to use the term Terra Australis as this was the name most familiar to the public. Flinders did so, and published the following rationale:

There is no probability, that any other detached body of land, of nearly equal extent, will ever be found in a more southern latitude; the name Terra Australis will, therefore, remain descriptive of the geographical importance of this country, and of its situation on the globe: it has antiquity to recommend it; and, having no reference to either of the two claiming nations, appears to be less objectionable than any other which could have been selected.

In the footnote to this, Flinders wrote:

Had I permitted myself any innovation on the original term, it would have been to convert it to AUSTRALIA; as being more agreeable to the ear, and an assimilation to the names of the other great portions of the earth.

In the first volume of A Voyage to Terra Australis this is the only occurrence of Australia as a single word, although Flinders also recounts Australia del Espiritu Santo, and in Appendix III found in the second volume, Robert Brown's General remarks, geographical and systematical, on the botany of Terra Australis, Brown makes use of the adjectival form Australian throughout – the first known use of that form. Despite popular conception, the book was not instrumental in the adoption of the name; rather, the name became gradually accepted over the subsequent ten years.

The first time that the name Australia appears to have been officially used was in a despatch to Lord Bathurst of 4 April 1817 in which Governor Lachlan Macquarie acknowledges the receipt of Flinders' charts of Australia. On 12 December 1817, Macquarie recommended to the Colonial Office that it be formally adopted. In 1824, the Admiralty agreed that the continent should be known officially as Australia.

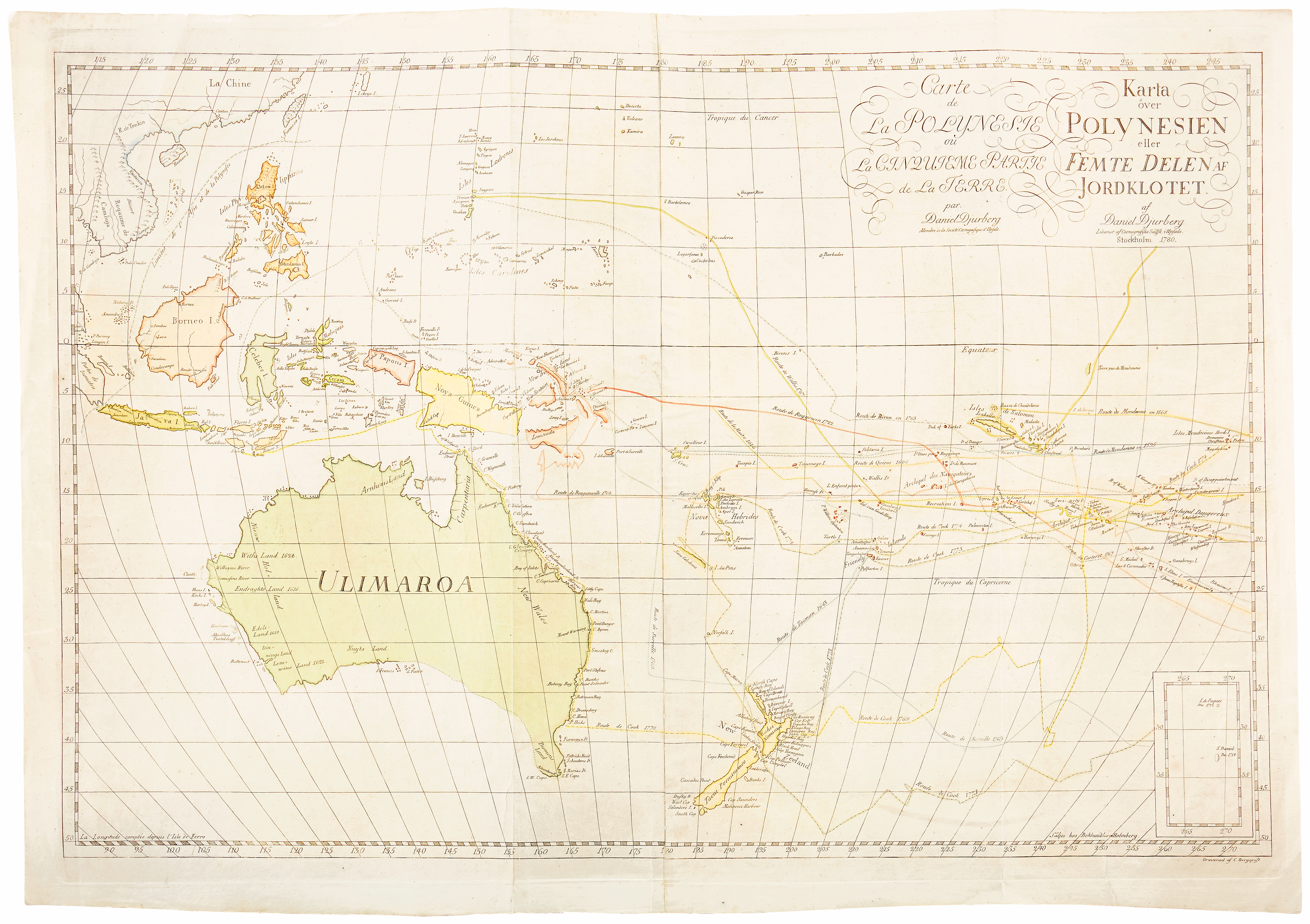
Djurberg's 1780 map, with Australia marked as Ulimaroa

Ulimaroa was a name given to Australia by the Swedish geographer and cartographer Daniel Djurberg in 1776. Djurberg adapted the name from Olhemaroa, a Māori word found in Hawkesworth's edition of Captain James Cook and Sir Joseph Banks' journals which is thought to have been a misunderstood translation – the Māori were actually referring to Grand Terre, the largest island of New Caledonia. Djurberg believed the name meant something like "big red land", whereas modern linguists believe it meant "long arm" (or hand) – echoing the geography of Grand Terre. The spurious name continued to be reproduced on certain European maps, particularly some Austrian, Czech, German and Swedish maps, until around 1820, including in Carl Almqvist's 1817 novel Parjumouf Saga ifrån Nya Holland (Stockholm, 1817). Nowadays, in Māori the term for Australia is Ahitereiria.

== The Commonwealth of Australia ==
The sovereign country Australia, formed in 1901 by the Federation of the six British colonies, is officially known as The Commonwealth of Australia, abbreviated within the Commonwealth of Australia Constitution Act and the Constitution of Australia to "the Commonwealth". The noun "commonwealth" was preferred over other options by a substantial majority of the delegates at the 1891 constitutional convention, giving the message that "the [six colonies] were not uniting into one country out of fear or after a war, but for the common good".

== Oz ==
The country has been referred to colloquially as Oz by people outside the country since the middle of the 20th century; and by Australians in more recent times.

The Australian National University reports that the "word Oz reproduces in writing the pronunciation of an abbreviation for Aussie, Australia, or Australian. The first evidence appears as Oss in 1908, and this form is likely to rhyme with boss. Overwhelmingly the later evidence (after 1944) is for the Oz spelling, with the final sound pronounced as ‘z’."

Oz is often taken as an oblique reference to The Wonderful Wizard of Oz (1900), a children's book by L. Frank Baum. Baum's fictional Land of Oz gained worldwide popularity with the 1939 release of the musical movie, The Wizard of Oz. The spelling Oz is likely to have been influenced by the 1939 movie, though the pronunciation was probably always with a /z/, as it is also for Aussie, sometimes spelt Ozzie. In 1988, an American opinion was that Australians' "image of Australia as a 'Land of Oz' is not new, and dedication to it runs deep". The Baz Luhrmann film Australia (2008) makes repeated reference to The Wizard of Oz, which appeared just before the wartime action of Australia.

John Algeo has speculated that Baum was inspired by Australia, in naming the Land of Oz: "In Ozma of Oz (1907), Dorothy gets back to Oz as the result of a storm at sea while she and Uncle Henry are travelling by ship to Australia. So, like Australia, Oz is somewhere to the west of California. Like Australia, Oz is an island continent. Like Australia, Oz has inhabited regions bordering on a great desert. One might almost imagine that Baum intended Oz to be Australia, or perhaps a magical land in the centre of the great Australian desert." This, however, contradicts Baum's own account of the origin of the name.

Australia's initial ccTLD was oz, with such domains moved to .oz.au, as discussed in Historical ccTLDs.

== Ahitereiria ==
The Māori name Ahitereiria appears in the Māori name for Food Standards Australia New Zealand, "Te Mana Kounga Kai – Ahitereiria me Aotearoa".

== Other epithets and nicknames ==
Australia is colloquially known as "the Land Down Under" (or just "Down Under"), which derives from the country's position in the Southern Hemisphere, near the antipodes of the United Kingdom. The term was first recorded in print in 1886, and was popularised internationally by the 1980 song of the same name by Men at Work. Other less common nicknames include "Straya" ("Australia" pronounced in an exaggerated Strine manner), and "Aussie", which is usually used as a demonym, but occasionally extended to the country as a whole (especially in New Zealand). More poetic epithets used within Australia include "the Great Southern Land" (re-popularised by a 1980s rock song, and not to be confused with the Great Southern region of Western Australia), "the Lucky Country" (deriving from Donald Horne's 1964 book of the same name), and two phrases deriving from Dorothea Mackellar's 1908 poem "My Country" – "the sunburnt country" and "the wide brown land".

== Sources ==
- Brown, Robert (1814). "Appendix III: General Remarks, Geographical and Systematical, on the Botany of Terra Australis". A Voyage to Terra Australis: Undertaken for the Purpose of Completing the Discovery of that Vast Country, and Prosecuted in the Years 1801, 1802, and 1803, in His Majesty's Ship the Investigator. By Flinders, Matthew. Vol. 2. London: G. Nicol & Son. pp. 533–612. Wikidata Q133863530.
- Butler, Susan Margaret, ed. (2005). "Australian pronunciations". Macquarie Dictionary (4th ed.). Macquarie Dictionary Publishers. ISBN 1-876429-14-3. LCCN 2006386738. OCLC 62887416. OL 8656799M. Wikidata Q131699806.
- Butler, Susan Margaret, ed. (2009). Macquarie Dictionary (5th ed.). Macquarie Dictionary Publishers. ISBN 1-876429-66-6. OCLC 311800446. OL 45201728M. Wikidata Q133889086.
- Estensen, Miriam (2002). The Life of Matthew Flinders. Allen & Unwin. ISBN 1-74114-152-4. "Flinders was not the first to use the name Australia. He may have known it from a 1799 chart of navigator James Wilson, possibly from a 1622 account of the voyage of Willem Schouten and Jacob Lemaire, or some other source."
- Flinders, Matthew (1814). A Voyage to Terra Australis: Undertaken for the Purpose of Completing the Discovery of that Vast Country, and Prosecuted in the Years 1801, 1802, and 1803, in His Majesty's Ship the Investigator. Vol. 1. London: G. Nicol & Son. Wikidata Q19027014.
- Gerritsen, Rupert (2013). "A note on 'Australia' or 'Austrialia'" (PDF). The Globe. 72. Australian and New Zealand Map Society: 23–30. ISSN 0311-3930.
- Purchas, Samuel (1625). "Chapter 10, The Copie of a Petition presented to the King of Spaine". Pvrchas his Pilgrimes. Vol. 4. London: Henry Featherstone. pp. 1422–1432. hdl:loc.rbc/rbdk.d0404. Wikidata Q133888203 – via Library of Congress.
