= Andreas Bruce =

Swedish writer (1808–1885)

Ferdinand Andreas Edvard Bruce
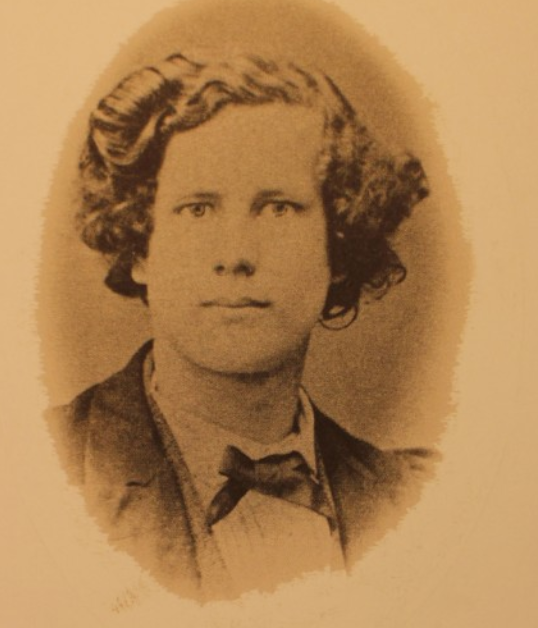
- Born: Christina Therese Isabelle Jeanette Louise Bruce; 28 December 1808; Stockholm, Sweden
- Died: 27 January 1885 (aged 76); Visby, Sweden
- Children: Carolina Bruce

Ferdinand "Andreas" Edvard Bruce, born as Christina "Therese" Isabelle Jeanette Louise Bruce (1808–1885), was a Swedish memoir writer. His story was the first memoir written by a transsexual person in Sweden and is regarded as unique in many aspects.

== Early life ==
Bruce was born to the nobleman and courtier Adam Bruce and Fredrica Charlotta Wijnblad. During his upbringing, he regarded himself as male, and wrestled with his brother with the approval of their father, and was generally referred to as Lilla Fröken Herrn ("Little Miss Mister"). As he reached adulthood, however, the family demanded he behave as a female. At the age of sixteen, he made an attempt to run away from home dressed as a male. After this, his father took him to be examined by a physician, Anders Johan Hagströmer, professor in anatomy and surgery in Stockholm. He went to the examination after the brother, with the father's permission, had dressed him as a male, and told the physician: "If I can not live in trousers, then I can not live at all".

== Gender transition ==
In July 1825, the physician issued a statement where Bruce was declared to be a "hermaphrodite" (intersex) whose male genitals were more developed than the female. After this statement was read, his father took him to a public house, celebrated with a drink, called him his new son, gave him the name Ferdinand Andreas Edvard Bruce and asked him to make sure not to shame the family name. He allowed him to use male dress and live publicly as a man. He also took a seat in the male section of the church with his father and brother, an incident which made a lady in church faint. He also visited the capital of Stockholm as a man, drank alcohol and smoked in public, which was then only acceptable for males.

However, his sex change was seen as a scandal by society and was reported in the press. This caused his family to disown him for having scandalized the family name, and he made peace with them only after having promised, dictated by a priest, to live a discreet private life outside Stockholm. In 1829, he moved to the island of Gotland, and took a job as a male clerk in the company of the ship owner Jacob Dubbe in Follingbo on Gotland. Dubbe was known to be so strict that few would work for him, but Bruce took it as a challenge to prove his male courage. Bruce also took part in the drills in the local militia, and regarding it as a way to prove his masculinity, he made such efforts that he received praise from his commanders. Apparently, it was actually known that Bruce was biologically female, but this was accepted and not openly spoken of. However, the military doctor disliked Bruce and, according to Bruce, banned him from the army for personal reasons.

Bruce normally only associated sexually with women. In July 1838, however, Bruce gave birth to a daughter, who he named Carolina. The father of the child was the inspector Lars Nyström. Bruce did not state whether the intercourse was a rape or not, only that he had not been careful. According to Bruce, Nyström had known he was biologically female and courted him, and after having become drunk together, Bruce had allowed Nyström to stay the night. After being pregnant, Nyström abandoned Bruce, who contemplated suicide. According to Bruce, he endured the pains of the birth according to the way a man was expected to ignore pain. After the delivery, Bruce moved from town to Öja with his daughter, his mistress Maria Lindblad and her daughter, and raised his daughter as her father. He was not allowed to marry Lindblad, and after it became known that he was the biological mother of his illegitimate daughter Carolina, he was denied the Churching of women, which prevented him from attending church for a period of ten years, a social stigma of the time.

== Legacy ==
Bruce wrote his own biography, partially in letters to his daughter Carolina between 1859 and 1881. It is regarded as unique as a biography from a transsexual in the 19th century in Sweden. Bruce is also known within scientific historical research.

Bruce has been pointed out as the role model for the character Tintomara in the novel Drottningens juvelsmycke by Carl Jonas Love Almqvist.

== See also ==
- Maria Johansdotter
- Lasse-Maja
