= Maria Olsdotter =

Swedish miner (1763–1856)

Maria Olsdotter (1763–1856), was a Swedish miner. She owned and managed the iron ore mine of Stråssa in Bergslagen. She actively participated in the mining herself and has been described as the first woman mining inspector (Gruvfogde or Mining Vogt) in Sweden. She became a famous figure in local folklore, and was known as "Gruvmora i Stråssa" ('Miner Mother of Stråssa') and "Gruv-Mor" ('Miner Mum').

== Life ==
She was the fourth of five daughters of the miner ”Mosis-Olle” Olof Ohlsson and Anna Israelsdotter. She and her siblings worked with their parents in the mine as children. In 1783, she married Erik Larsson (d. 1817), with whom she had one child, their daughter Anna-Stina Ersdotter (d. 1876). Her husband was the son of the owner of the Stråssa mine. The marriage was reportedly very happy. After the death of her husband in 1817, she took over the management of the Stråssa mine: brought up as a miner, she did not merely own the mine but personally led the work as overseer and inspector, and was as such a pioneer as probably the first woman in Sweden to have done so.

Maria Olsdotter became known in her own time as well as in history for the many stories which were told about her. She was known as a bold hunter, accompanied her husband during the hunt and then hunted alone with all-male hunting companions, and was known for her achievements as a hunter. Apparently, she enjoyed using spells to enhance her success and to affect the weather: this was a common practice in traditional folk belief, but whether she believed them or simply used them as a habit is unknown. Nevertheless, they were a part of her eccentricity, though she laughed about them when the stories were reported to her.

She was the maternal aunt of the famous con artist Lasse-Maja, who described his aunt thus:

She was a true heroine of her sex, dressed herself in the clothes of a hunter, was an accomplished rider, loved to hunt and have other adventures of her own and was in effect more of a man than a woman.

Lasse-Maja later blamed his aunt and her daughter Anna-Stina Ersdotter for having enticed him to his criminal activity, and it is clear that they played an important role in his life.

== Legacy ==
Maria Olsdotter became a famous figure in Bergslagen folklore. She has figured in many books as well as a novel. She is portrayed by Barbro Larsson in the film Den byxlöse äventyraren (1971) about her nephew Lasse-Maja.
