= Margareta Elisabeth Roos =

Swedish soldier and crossdresser

Margareta Elisabeth Roos or Anna Stina Roos (1696–1772) was a Swedish woman and a crossdresser who served as a soldier in the Swedish army of Charles XII of Sweden during the Great Northern War.

== Biography ==
Margareta Elisabeth Roos (She is also called Anna Stina Roos) was born the daughter of a Captain in the Swedish province of Ingria in Karelia. Roos enlisted in the army in 1713. She served until the end of the war, during which she was noted for her courage and promoted to the rank of non-commissioned officer for bravery in battle.

She is reported to have served in the regiment of General Field Marshal Count Carl Gustaf Dücker (1663–1732). Apparently, she was never discovered. She is said to have been so "masculine" in her ways that no-one suspected her of being a woman, and she was also as tall as a man.

Roos left the army in 1721 after the Treaty of Nystad in which Sweden formally ceded Ingria to Russia. After the war, she was employed for three years as head butler at the household of Countess Dücker, Hedvig Vilhelmina Oxenstierna (1682–1758). During an illness, however, a maid discovered her to be a woman and informed the countess. The countess agreed to keep quiet, but arranged a marriage for her with an officer. The officer was John Gustave Irving (1683–1744) himself a veteran of the Great Northern War.

The marriage took place in 1724 and lasted for twenty years, during which she had at least two children. After the death of her spouse, she moved to Köping in Västmanland. Her daughter Margareta Charlotta Irving (1728-1765), married Nils Larsson Sundell (1692–1757), vicar at Bro parish in Västmanland. Roos spent much of her later years with her daughter and son-in-law. During her old age, she was said to have given numerous proofs of a "male and courageous mind".

The description of her service in the army was given by her family to a priest in 1843, 71 years after her death. Margareta Elisabeth Roos' service in the army is regarded as unconfirmed, as it was recounted only after her own death.

In contrast to other women serving in the army posing as men, including Ulrika Eleonora Stålhammar and Lisbetha Olsdotter, Margareta Elisabeth Roos was never discovered and brought to trial, and she is therefore not mentioned in any court documents, nor is the name which she used as a soldier known, which makes it hard to verify in military documents. However, the story about her is well known and is regarded to indicate a certain tolerance and admiration for women serving as soldiers, at least within aristocratic circles, despite the fact that it was regarded as a serious crime for a woman to pose as a man by contemporary law. The fact that she married a man after service is also taken as an indicator that posing as a soldier did not lower the repute as a marriage candidate.

== See also ==
- Brita Hagberg
- Lovisa von Burghausen

== Other sources ==
- Alf Åberg (1999) Karolinska Kvinnoöden (Natur & Kultur ) ISBN 91-27-07761-6, in Swedish, page 160
