= Lasse-Maja =

Swedish thief and memoirist

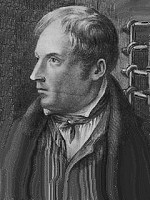
Lasse-Maja

Lars Larsson Molin, alias Lasse-Maja (Djupdalen, Ramsberg, Västmanland, 5 October 1785 – 4 June 1845, Arboga), was a Swedish thief and memoirist. He was famous in history for disguising himself as a woman during his tours as a thief. His disguise gave him the nickname Lasse-Maja, a combination of the male name Lars and the female name Maja. He wrote his own memoirs, which became very popular in 19th-century Sweden.

== Biography ==
=== Early life ===
Lasse-Maja was the son of the tailor Lars Olsson and Stina Olsdotter. He was raised on the torp Nöden in the village Djupdalen in the Ramsberg parish in Västmanland. His mother came from a wealthy family and had been married before to a wealthy man by the name Molin, but his father lost her money, and Lasse-Maja was raised in poverty. In his childhood parish, he was described as an easygoing character with a fondness for entertaining people with jokes, but also for his refusal to work and for his thefts.

He was the nephew of Maria Olsdotter, his maternal aunt, who owned and operated the Stråssa Mine after her husband. He described his aunt:

"She was a true heroine of her sex, dressed herself in the clothes of a hunter, was an accomplished rider, loved to hunt and have other adventures of her own and was in effect more of a man than a woman."

Lasse-Maja later blamed his aunt and her daughter Anna-Stina Ersdotter for having enticed him to his criminal activity, and it is clear that they played an important role in his life.

=== Criminal career ===
Initially, he made stealing tours around his home parish with his then mistress, Maja Andersdotter. He was sentenced for theft the first time in 1802.

In 1804, he left his home parish and came to Stockholm at the age of nineteen. Between 1804 and 1813, Lasse-Maja made several tours stealing in Stockholm and the countryside around the capital. His tours as a thief foremost took place in the triangle of Stockholm–Örebro–Västerås. He was caught several times, but managed to escape. In 1807, he was whipped for stealing. In 1808, he was sentenced to life imprisonment, but managed to escape. From 1809 onward, he called himself 'Molin' – originally, his name was simply the patronymicon 'Larsson', and 'Molin' was the name of his mother's first, wealthy husband.

Lasse-Maja became a notorious thief, stealing especially from rich people. His speciality was to dress in women's clothing, for which he has become famous. Lasse-Maja claimed that the idea to dress himself as a woman (as well as calling himself by the name 'Lasse-Maja') originated from an incident in his homeparish Ramsberg, when he was visiting his mistress Maja Andersdotter:

"One day it occurred to me to dress myself in her clothing, and she returned just as I was finished. 'Oh My!', she cried, 'How splendid you look in women's clothing!', and she called for her parents so that they may see, how well Lasse looked in her clothes."

Thus, he was called 'Lasse-Maja': Lasse after himself, as it was the diminutive form of Lars' and Maja after Maja Andersdotter. Reportedly, he used female clothing so as to catch his victims off-guard, as well as aid his escapes from the crime scenes. When in disguise, he sometimes flirted with the men. However, the disguise was not used solely for professional reasons: he was also said to have been comfortable in women's clothes, and described in his memoirs, that he lived both as a woman as a man during his free time. In his memoirs, Lasse-Maja described male clothing as preferable when escaping from crime scenes because they were easier to move in, and that he often impersonated women working as a lady's maid, as a housekeeper and a prostitute.

During his criminal career, he worked with other criminals, such as the notorious thief Bajard and his gang. In 1812, he became the associate of one Johan Cron, a former official who had the ability to forge passports.

=== Imprisonment ===
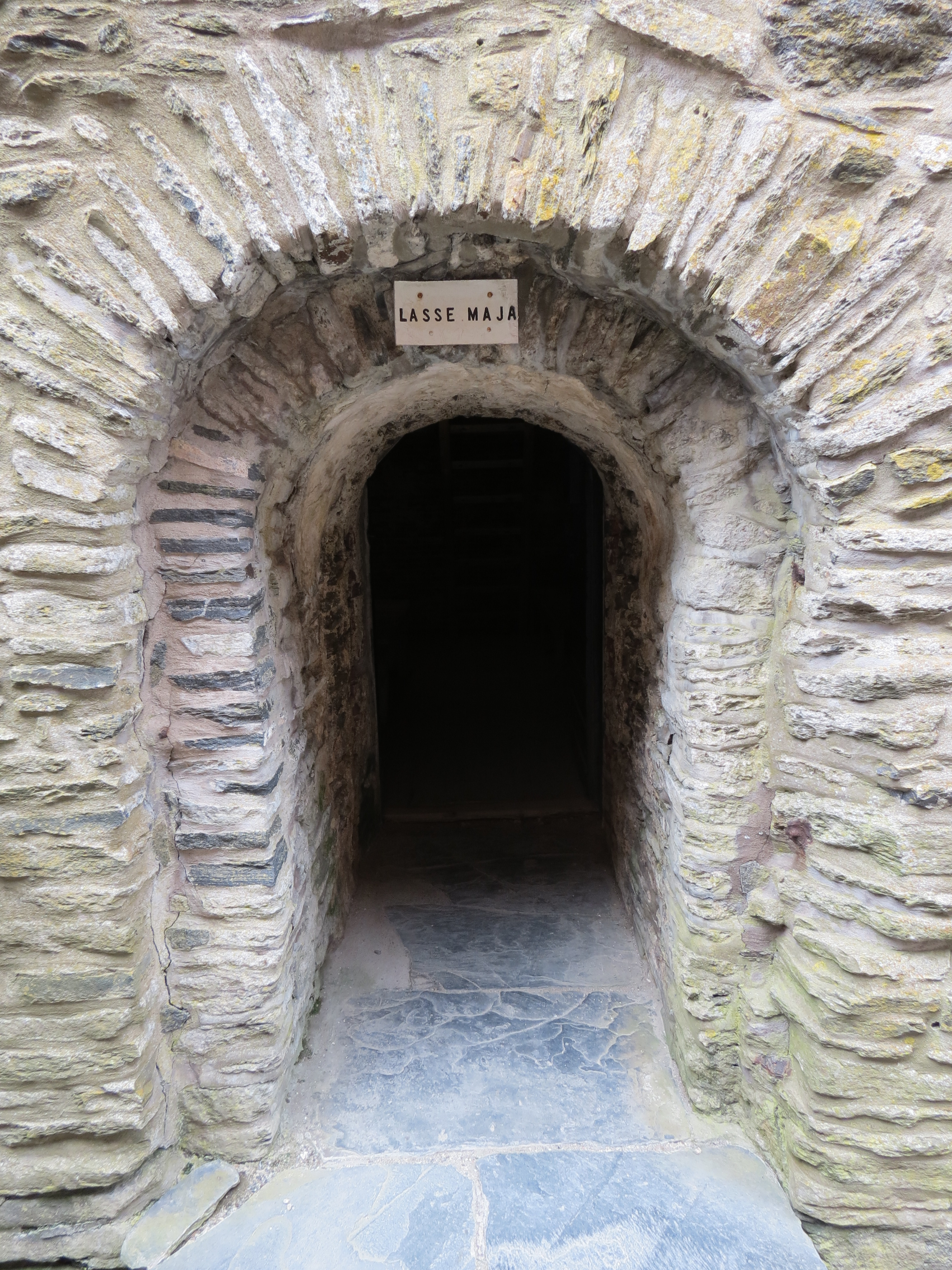
Lasse-Maja cell at the Carlsten Fortress.

In 1813, Lasse-Maja was arrested after stealing the church silver from the Järfälla Church with two assistants, a crime performed on the initiative of Johan Cron. Theft of church silver was considered a very serious crime in this time period. Additionally, he was recognized for other crimes during his previous tours, and put on trial for them as well. He was judged guilty as charged and sentenced to Uppenbar kyrkoplikt and life imprisonment in the Carlsten Fortress in Marstrand.

He behaved in an exemplary manner as a prisoner, and his time in jail soon became quite comfortable. He became a tourist attraction for the upper-class visitors vacationing in the city of Marstrand, and earned money by successfully charging money from visitors in exchange for entertaining them with stories about his criminal career. With this money he was able to raise his personal status and standard in prison considerably as well as among his fellow prisoners. He was also well liked because of his ability as a cook, a position in which he functioned during his time in prison.

He became famous. In 1833, he published his own memoirs, Lasse-Majas besynnerliga öden. Av honom själv berättade ('The Strange Tales of Lasse-Maja. As Told by Himself'). During his time in prison, he appealed for a pardon five times. In 1835, he was visited by the crown prince, the future king Oscar I., whose father finally had him pardoned and released in 1839.

=== Later life ===
After his release, Lasse-Maja lived with his brother, the brewer Anders Ramberg in Arboga. He made tours around Sweden, entertaining people with stories about his former life.

He is said to have claimed that life was very hard, but that the most important thing was to have fun. He bought his own property outside Arboga, where he eventually died in 1845, after having been ill his last years. He was buried in the cemetery of Heliga Trefaldighets kyrka ("Holy Trinity church") in central Arboga.

== Legacy ==
There are many stories about Lasse-Maja. He is mentioned in memoirs and diaries, appears as a character in novels and films, and is undoubtedly the most famous transvestite in Swedish history – he became almost an icon, and is much romanticised.

=== Memoirs ===
The memoirs, Lasse-Majas besynnerliga öden. Av honom själv berättade ('The Strange Tales of Lasse-Maja. As Told by Himself'), was first published in 1833. They were popular, and were continuously reprinted during the 19th- and 20th-centuries. In it, Lasse-Maja describes sex with both men and women, although the sex scenes with men are described as jokes while the sex scenes with women are described as genuine: the reason was possibly because homosexual acts was criminalized. On one occasion, Lasse-Maja described how he worked at a brothel as a female prostitute, kissing and embracing a male client, but exchanging himself for a genuine prostitute woman in the end.

The memoirs were also often shortened and reprinted in broadside ballads. In one form or another, the Lasse-Maja memoirs belonged to the most-read literature in the countryside peasantry during the 19th century. In the 1930s, when an old farmer was interviewed and questioned about the reading habits of people around him in his youth, he replied: "What people used to read? Well, mostly just Lasse-Maja and the Bible."

=== Music ===
He is the subject of 'Lasse-Majas visa', a song by Stefan Andersson (singer).

=== Memorial stone ===
There is a memorial stone over Lasse-Maja by the church in his home parish Ramsberg.

=== Walking trail ===
There is a walking trail starting in Morskoga close to his home parish, and ending in Ösarhyttan, where he used to visit his relatives during his upbringing, with information about him on signs the way.

=== Lasse-Maja cell ===
The cell of Lasse-Maja during his time on the Carlsten Fortress is still preserved and open to visitors, with a sign with the name "Lasse-Maja" over the door.

=== Lasse-Maja Skerry ===
A Skerry by Hamnskär outside Enhörnalandet in Mälaren has been called Lasse-Majas skär ('Lasse Maja Skerry') after an incident when a boat sunk after hitting a skerry. Lasse-Maja and his cousin Anna-Stina Ersdotter (daughter of his aunt Maria Olsdotter) were passengers and both escaped unharmed.

=== Lasse-Maja in fiction ===
- Lasse-Maja (1941), film by Gunnar Olsson, with Sture Lagerwall as Lasse-Maja.
- Den byxlöse äventyraren (1971), TV-series by Lars Göran Carlson and Edvard Matz, with Jonas Bergström as Lasse-Maja.
- Stortjuvens pojke (1992), film by Henry Meyer, with Carlo Schmidt as Lasse-Maja.

== See also ==
- Anna Ekelöf
- Anna Gyllander
- Andreas Bruce
