= Tintomara =

Tintomara may refer to:

- A character in the Swedish novel Drottningens juvelsmycke
- Tintomara (film), a 1970 Danish-Swedish film adaptation of the novel Drottningens juvelsmycke
