= Johan Mazer =

Swedish merchant (1790–1847)

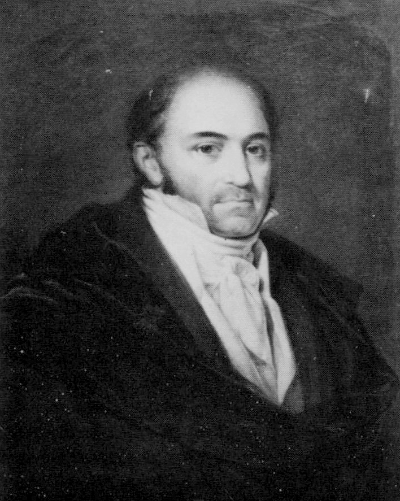
Johan Mazer (c.1840); by Johan Gustaf Sandberg

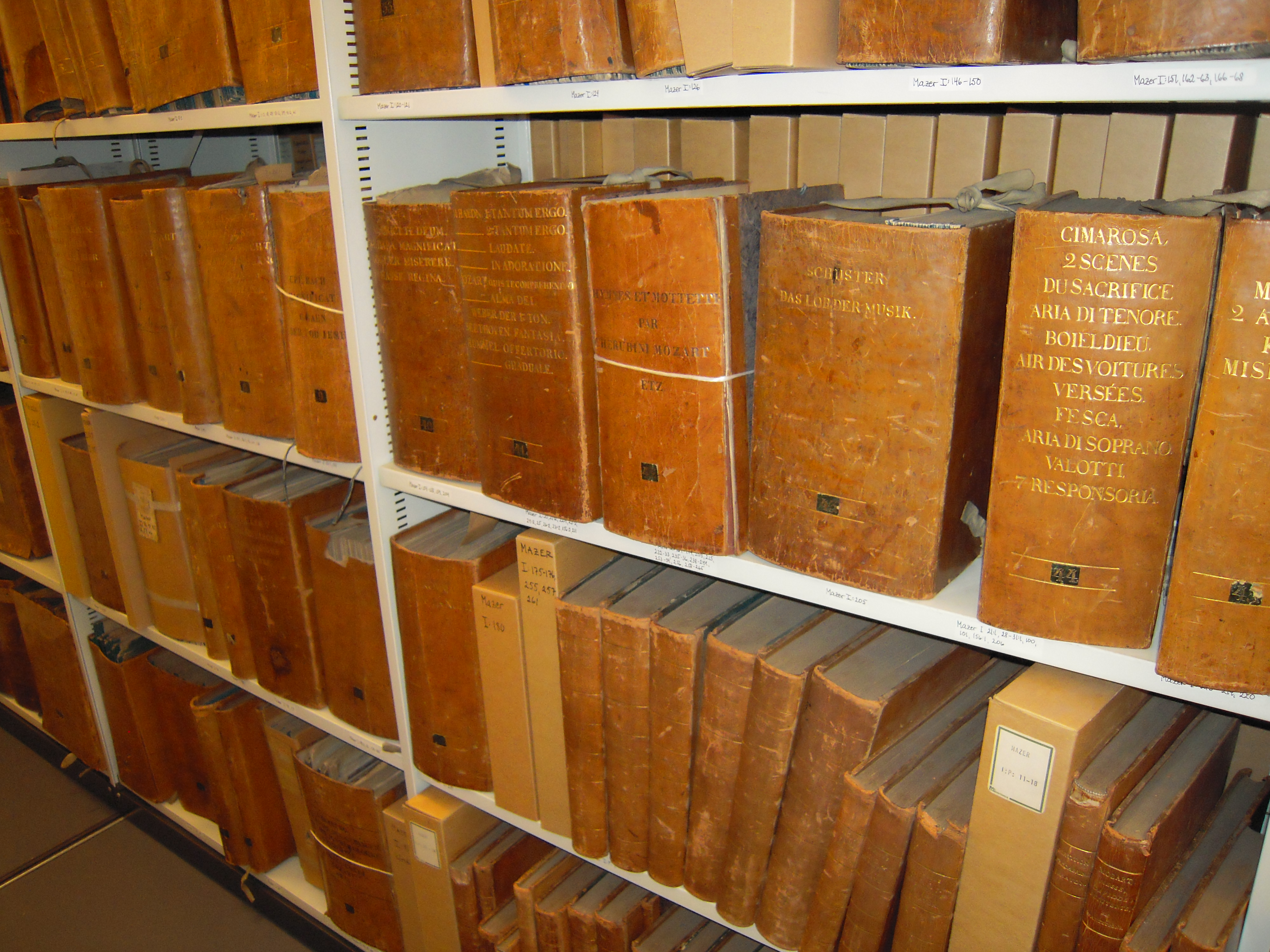
The Mazer Collection of sheet music in The Music and Theatre Library of Sweden

Johan Mazer (7 March 1790, Stockholm - 25 October 1847, Stockholm) was a Swedish merchant, musician, concert manager, and collector.

== Biography ==
He was born to Jean-Pierre Mazer († 1829), a silk weaver and stocking maker, originally from France, and his first wife, Brita Maria née Sjöman. He and his younger brother, Anton, went to a French convent school, where he studied music and Latin. When their father died, he left them a large fortune, and they took over his company; Anton oversaw the manufacturing, and Johan the sales. Their half-brother, Carl Peter, was studying art in Paris and never took part in the company's operations.

It soon became clear that Johan was more interested in music than business. His summers were spent at his home on Djurgården, hosting concerts of chamber music. The participants ranged from capable amateurs to well-known professionals. Each session was recorded in a journal; in meticulous detail. Altogether, 358 gatherings were held, and over 1200 pieces of music played. The affairs always featured a meal, which he often cooked himself. In the process, he collected a large amount of sheet music, which he had professionally bound. He also collected instruments, such as violins by the Guarneris and the Amatis. Once, he built his own contrabass.

In 1840, he was elected a member of the Royal Swedish Academy of Music, second class; a category that included music connoisseurs and promoters. He was presented with a medal, inscribed with the Academy's motto: " Anda och Konst" (Spirit and Art).

In his will, he decreed that the meetings should continue, and that his friends should form a company for that purpose. They followed his wishes and, in 1849, the "Mazerska kvartettsällskapet" (Quartet Company) began its activities. Although its procedures have changed somewhat, the Company continues to meet today. Their concerts have been recorded since the technology first became available, creating a valuable historical record.

Mazer, who never married or had children, bequeathed his notes to King Oscar I. His instruments and sheet music went to what is now the Musik- och teaterbiblioteket (Music and Theatre Library), while a monetary donation went to the Royal Academy, for the purpose of establishing an amateur Quartet Company, that would perform there.
