= Anna Gyllander =

Swedish impostor

Anna Gyllander (born c. 1633 – fl. 1659) was a Swedish imposter, who during the reign of King Charles X Gustav of Sweden, presented herself to be the abdicated queen Christina of Sweden.

== The fraud ==
In 1659, rumours reached King Charles X Gustav that there was a woman travelling about the country who claimed to be the former regent queen Christina, who abdicated and was living in Rome. The alleged "Queen Christina" had travelled about the country for at least a year, toasting "her brother the king" and firing gunshots to his honour. When asked if she was "Cristina Regina", she reportedly replied: "Ni säger så" (In English: "I hear you say that," or: "So you say"), and said that her parents were King Gustav II Adolf of Sweden and Queen Maria Eleonora. She never said straight out that she was Queen Christina, but gave the impression this was the case, and never denied it when others claimed she was.

The impostor was apprehended and identified as Anna Gyllander, daughter of Anders Gyllander from Norrköping and married to a cavalry captain from Courland in the division of Kruuse.

She defended herself by claiming that she had no idea how serious the whole thing would be considered and pleaded for mercy. The king sentenced her to one month imprisonment on bread and water, followed by banishment and exile from the kingdom and its provinces.

== See also ==
- Helga de la Brache
- Anna Ekelöf
- Lasse-Maja
