= Ulrika Eleonora Stålhammar =

Swedish woman cross-dresser who served as a soldier

Ulrika Eleonora Stålhammar (1683 in Svenarum – 16 February 1733 at Björnskog in Hultsjö), was a Swedish corporal and crossdresser who served in the Great Northern War. She was put on trial for having served in the military posing as a man and for marrying a woman. She has been the object of plays, literature, research and exhibitions.

== Background ==
Ulrika Eleonora Stålhammar was born to lieutenant-colonel Johan Stålhammar (1653-1711) and Anna Brita Lood (d. 1699). Her exact year of birth is not confirmed, as the church documents are missing for the 1680s. The year 1683 is traditionally given because her age at the time of her death in 1733 is given as 50 years old. In any event, she was born after her elder sister Elisabet Catharina, who was born in 1680, and before the eldest of her younger sisters, Brita Christina, who was born in 1689, and 1683 or 1688 are often given as her year of birth. She had five sisters: Elisabet Catharina (1680-1730), Brita Christina (1689-1749), Maria Sofia (1690-1766), Gustaviana Margareta (1691-?) and Anna Brita (1696-1756). Her father Johan Stålhammar was himself a veteran of the war, but became almost ruined after his retirement in 1702.

She was raised at Stensjö manor. Ulrika later stated she had always enjoyed the tasks usually given to men, that she had hardly learned any of the tasks normally performed by females at all. She said that people who had seen her hunt and ride had told her that it was a shame that she was not a man, so her talents would have "been put to better use in the world". After the death of her heavily indebted father in 1711, she and her five sisters were left without money, and the family estate was mortgaged. They relied on the charity of relatives and entered into arranged marriages with people whom they considered to be below their standards in order to support themselves: within four years of her father's death, all her sisters were married. Ulrika, who had watched her sisters enter unpleasant marriages, did not wish to marry, and in March 1713, she dressed herself in her father's clothes, stole a horse from the stable and ran away from home. Reportedly she "escaped a proposed marriage which was for her unpleasant".

She took on the name of Vilhelm Edstedt. She had the plan to enlist in the army from the beginning, and "long searched for an opportunity to enlist, working until then as taffeltäckare for Governor Mannerborg in Åbo, and as a servant to guard lieutenant Casper Johan Berch".

== Military career and marriage ==
Ulrika Eleonora Stålhammar finally enlisted in the army as an artillerist in Kalmar on 15 October 1715 under the name of Vilhelm Edstedt. She did not participate in active warfare, as she was posted in the garrison of Kalmar, which did not see any action during the Great Northern War. Nevertheless, she was successful in her professional conduct and was eventually promoted to the rank of corporal. Reportedly, she preferred to rent a room rather than to sleep in the barracks. This was permitted and acceptable, though somewhat unusual among common soldiers, who normally preferred not to spend their meager salary on special sleeping arrangements.

On New Year's Eve 1716, she became engaged to a maid named Maria Lönnman, and married her 15 April of that year. It was later reported that Löhnman thought that Stålhammar was impotent, but that she was content to live without sex, as she had previously been the victim of rape. Ulrika eventually revealed her sex, and they continued to live happily in what was later described as a union of "spiritual love".

In 1724, her sister Elisabet Catharina learned of what she had done. Shocked over both the crossdressing and the same-sex marriage, she wrote to Ulrika that she had committed a "sin against the will of God".

Ulrika promised her sister to leave the army, but she did not do this until 25 August 1726. She wrote to her wealthy aunt, the widow of her late uncle, the landowner Sofia Drake, and asked for protection for Maria and herself. Sofia Drake had her son bring Ulrika Eleonora and Maria from Kalmar. Drake arranged for Stålhammar to be housed with relatives in the country in Värmland, so that she could gradually get used to wearing women's clothing again, while Maria was given refuge at the mansion of Drake, Salshult outside Vetlanda in Småland. At one point, the couple managed to meet at the estate of the royal equerry Silfversparre at Gullaskruv, were Maria were temporarily given refuge: it is not mentioned under which circumstances they met. Maria Lönman apparently made a good impression on Drake.

== Trial and verdict ==
To pose as a member of the opposite sex was, under the current law, a serious religious crime which could be punishable by death. Rumors were spreading about Stålhammar. In midsummer 1728, on the advice of her family, Ulrika went to Helsingör in Denmark, and wrote a letter of confession to the Swedish government and asked for its pardon. Stålhammar asked the King for pardon because of: "My weak sex, who if only with the deepest humility, loyalty and steadfastness in ten years served the Swedish crown". She returned to Sofia Drake at Salshult, from where she reported herself to the authorities in Jönköping.

On 10 February 1729, Ulrika Eleonora Stålhammar and Maria Lönman were put on trial in Kalmar. The court of Kalmar did not know under what charge they should be prosecuted, and consulted the high court Göta hovrätt in Jönköping. After consulting the Bible, Stålhammar was charged with having "violated the order of God" by dressing as a man, and with "making a mockery of marriage" by marrying a member of the same sex.

Stålhammar was also charged for having married a member of the same sex, Maria Löhnman. She confessed that she had been taken by "a strong love" for Löhnman and had decided "to live and to die with her". She claimed to have fallen in love with her during a dream, and proposed to her. After some time of courting and correspondence, Löhnman had accepted her proposal. Fourteen days after their wedding, Stålhammar, "after many sighs and tears", had confessed to Löhnman that she was perhaps not the "right man", and revealed herself. Maria Löhnman had reproached her, but promised not to reveal her so as not to cause her harm and finally said: "If it is so, do not mourn. Thanks to God, that has never been a concern for me".

Maria Löhnman testified that she had initially thought Stålhammar to be a hermaphrodite. But she confessed that she had loved Stålhammar even more since she had found out her true sex, and that she could never have betrayed her but instead prayed to God that the matter would never be revealed and that Stålhammar would not be called out to serve so that they could be with each other forever.

The couple both denied to the court that they had any sexual contact with each other. Before Stålhammar revealed herself, Löhnman had laid upon her arm, nothing more. Stålhammar also claimed that she had fallen in love with Löhnman because of her virtue, and several witnesses testified that the couple was known for their virtue. When the court asked Stålhammar how she could have lived a married life for ten years without men, she replied that: "as she, thanks to God, never had any debauched thoughts and even less so any natural lust, there was never any need for her to associate with any male person". The court asked Löhnman if she and Stålhammar ever "had any of the love exercise of the sort married couples have?", upon which she answered: "No, she never did nor invite it".

The court was curious as to how Stålhammar had managed to pass for a male, and had a midwife examine her physically. The midwife reported that she was completely normally developed, except for being unusually flat chested for a woman. However, the judges were also impressed and intrigued with her. She was from Småland, which reminded people of the legendary female warrior Blenda, who was also from Småland.

Her aunt, Sofia Drake, also made a "powerful intervention" to her behalf, which is regarded to have worked in her favor.

The Göta Court of Appeal passed the sentence that the marriage had broken the law of God and nature, but acquitted them from the charge of homosexuality, as they decided to believe the testimonies that the couple had lived in a marriage without sex. This caused the judges to view the marriage favorably, as it was "of the purest, most spiritual kind, a union of virtue".

On 18 December 1729, Ulrika Eleonora Stålhammar was judged guilty of having posed as a man and marrying a woman. These were crimes which formally meant a death sentence, but Stålhammar's sentences was limited to one month imprisonment on water and bread, followed by pillorying and exile from Kalmar. Maria Lönman was sentenced to fourteen days imprisonment for having neglected to reveal the truth.

On 30 January 1730, King Frederick I of Sweden reduced Stålhammar's sentences by removing the specification of "water and bread", while Maria Lönman's sentence was reduced to eight days.

After having served their sentences, the couple lived a quiet life on the estates of Ulrika's relatives. Ulrika Eleonora Stålhammar lived at Hultsjö Manor outside Sävsjö, with her Elisabet Ramsvärd, widow after colonel lieutenancy Erik Silfversparre: her daughter Margareta Elisabet was married to Ulrika Eleonora's cousin Otto Fredrik Stålhammar, the son of Sofia Drake. Maria Löhnman was employed as a housekeeper to Stålhammar's aunt, Sofia Drake af Torp och Hamra, at Salshult Manor outside Vetlanda. Letters display Ulrika Stålhammar's and Maria Löhnman's love for each other. Ulrika died in 1733, and Maria continued as a housekeeper for Ulrika's aunt and later her cousin until her death on 16 May 1761.

== Context ==
During the early modern age, there were several cases of women serving in the Swedish army posing as men. Previously, there had been the case of Brita Olofsdotter, who served in the Swedish cavalry in the war in Livonia in 1569, and the case of Lisbetha Olsdotter, was convicted and executed for serving as a soldier under the name of Mats Ersson. These cases did in fact reach something of a peak during the early 18th century. Contemporary to Ulrika Eleonora Stålhammar, Anna Jöransdotter and Margareta Elisabeth Roos both served in the army of Charles XII of Sweden during the Great Northern War: in the case of Roos it was unconfirmed, as she was never put on trial, but Anna Jöransdotter served under the name Johan Haritu until she was discovered in 1714, and a third woman is known to have been whipped for her service as a soldier during the campaign in Norway, but continued to be seen in male clothing on the streets of Stockholm until the 1740s, where she was known as "The Rider".

There was a certain awareness about the phenomena among the public: in 1715, during a trial against male homosexuality, the soldier Jürgen Wiess defended himself by claiming that the only reason why he had reacted willingly to the sexual advances of a male corporal was because he believed the corporal to be a woman in disguise, as it was known that there were several disguised women among the soldiers.

== In popular culture ==
Ulrika Eleonora Stålhammar is the subject of the book Ulrica Eleonora Karl XII:s Amazon (Ulrica Eleonora, the Amazon of Charles XII) by Colibrine Sandström., and in a play which was performed by Calmare Gycklare in 2005.

== See also ==
- Carin du Rietz
- Brita Hagberg
- Margareta von Ascheberg
- Lovisa von Burghausen
