= Helga de la Brache =

Swedish con artist (1817–1885)

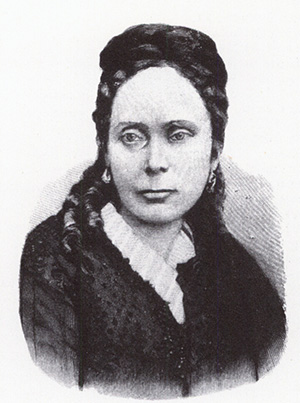
- De la Brache in 1860
- Born: Aurora Florentina Magnusson; 6 September 1817; Stockholm, Sweden
- Died: 11 January 1885 (aged 67); Stockholm, Sweden
- Other names: Anna Florentina de la Brache
- Occupation: Con artist
- Known for: supposed secret royalty

Helga de la Brache (born Aurora Florentina Magnusson; 6 September 1817 in Stockholm – 11 January 1885), was a Swedish con artist. She obtained a royal pension by convincing the authorities that she was the secret legitimate daughter of King Gustav IV of Sweden and Queen Frederica of Baden.

== Fraud ==
In 1861, a woman by the name Helga de la Brache petitioned the government of King Charles XV for a pension with the claim of being the secret legitimate daughter of Gustav IV of Sweden, who had been deposed and exiled in the Coup of 1809. She was born poor.

The exiled Gustav IV and Frederica of Baden had divorced in 1812. News of Gustav IV and his family was banned in Sweden since his exile. Helga de la Brache claimed that the former king and queen had married again, secretly, "in a convent in Germany", which resulted in her birth in Lausanne in 1820. She was sent to Sweden to be raised by her alleged father's aunt, Princess Sophia Albertine of Sweden. When the Princess died in 1829, Helga was taken to the Vadstena asylum, so that she would be seen as insane, and her true identity kept a secret.

She was released in 1834 and taken to her family in Baden, where she was placed under house arrest. In 1837, she read about the death of her father in the paper, and was not able to conceal her grief. She was again placed in an asylum in Sweden, to prevent her true identity being made public. She eventually managed to escape from the asylum. She was provided for by the charity of people who supported her claims, and was soon granted a pension of 6,000 § from her mother's family in Germany.

In 1850, the pension stopped, and she was unable to continue the life to which she accustomed by birth. This was to the reason to why she was forced to ask the government for an allowance. She was also forced to support her many faithful friends, who had stood by her during her years of persecution. Because of this, no smaller pension than 5,000 or 6,000 would be sufficient.

Her story was believed by many people in Sweden and Finland, and she was given financial support from private benefactors. Followed by her faithful lady's companion, who was an educated and cultivated woman who supported her story, de la Brache acted with a combination of simplicity and naivete. Her way of acting gave the impression that she was not cunning enough to have made up the story, and yet sensible enough for people to believe that she was not insane, but fully believed her own claim. One of the reasons why such a story could be believed was that all contact with the deposed former dynasty in exile was forbidden after the Coup of 1809, which made it hard to verify and examine the alleged family relations.

In 1859, de la Brache and her companion arrived in the capital of Stockholm. They lived as guests at the home of the upper class woman and professor's wife Lidbeck, who believed the story about the secret royal birth. Lidbeck's daughter Mrs Sandströmer introduced them to Frances Lewin-von Koch. She convinced the salon hostess Frances Lewin-von Koch (1804–1888), the British born spouse of the minister of justice, Nils von Koch, who housed her and provided her with a lawyer. Through Frances Lewin-von Koch she also convinced her husband the Justice Minister.

She also convinced the parliamentary Anders Uhr and the Royal Court Chaplain Carl Norrby. She was however seen as a fraud by Prime Minister Louis Gerhard De Geer and Foreign Minister Ludvig Manderström. Queen Mother Josefina took a personal interest in her, and provided her with an allowance. The king did not take much interest, but wanted to get the whole affair over and done with. She was granted a meeting with the king who afterward remarked to the parliamentarians: "Why, she is just as sane as you or me".

The claim of de la Brache's royal birth was presented to the king's government by Nils von Koch in behalf of de la Brache on 26 March 1861. While Nils von Koch stated that he, having made inquiries, could not confirm her claim to be true, neither could he prove it to be impossible, and supported her request. The king granted de la Brache a pension "without being able to prove the claims of Miss de la Brache to be truthful or merely claimed as a consequence of a confused imagination". In March 1861, the king allowed her an annual pension from the foreign department of 2,400 Swedish riksdaler a year (the amount originally 1,200, was increased in December 1869). Her pension was enlarged in 1868 on request by author August Blanche and captain Julius Mankell, and again in 1869, out of consideration for her financial distress. She kept up her claim for several years, and continued to receive the allowance.

== Exposure ==
In 1870, however, she was publicly exposed as a fraud. While her royal birth as such was in no way supported by the king or government, the fact that she had received a pension after having claimed royal birth did give her claims some support in high society, and she was given financial gifts by many rich individuals. De la Brache received such private financial gifts from the queen dowager through the queen dowager's agent C. Norrby. In 1870, Norrby had forwarded sums amounting to 10,000 $ to de la Brache from queen dowager Josephine, and started to have doubts and issue private investigations.

Norrby found and interviewed the sister of Henrika Aspegren, who informed him about the past, and he also made contact with Gustav, Prince of Vasa in Germany, who categorically refuted the claim of de la Brache as his secret half sister as impossible, as his parents had never met after their divorce.

Norrby made copies of church records, informed the government and thereafter had the result of the investigation published in the press on 7 February 1870. On 23 March 1870, the government recalled the pension previously granted with the note that "all uncertainty regarding the birth of the so called Helga De la Brache is now erased", and de la Brache was officially declared to be identical to Aurora Florentina Magnusson.

== Real story ==
In the private Norrby investigation of 1870 it was proved that she was born in Stockholm as Aurora Florentina Magnusson, daughter of the janitor Anders Magnusson (died 1826). Her mother was left a poor widow with five children, and Magnusson only received one year of school education. At Aurora's confirmation, her mother was overheard saying that Aurora was not her biological daughter, but a foster child. She named her biological parents, both of whom belonged to the upper classes: her father as Count Carl De Geer, and her mother as a "Förnäm fröken" (Unmarried noblewoman). This may have been either true or false, as no information has been confirmed one way or the other, but it is nevertheless believed to have influenced Aurora Magnusson.

In 1835, she was employed as a maid to a book-keeper named Hedman. The Hedman family commented that she always had the mind to "rise above her status". In 1838, she was employed by the wealthy merchant Henrik Aspegren on Västerlånggatan 78. She was originally hired as a sewing help for the daughters of the Aspegren family to prepare for a ball. When the Aspegrens were about to leave for the ball, Magnusson burst into tears and told them that she was homeless and had nowhere to sleep for the night, and she was invited to stay. One of the daughters, Henrika, became deeply devoted to her. Henrika dressed Aurora in elegant clothes, and left her family for her. It was Henrika Aspegren who later became her companion and accomplice in the fraud. Already during her time at the Aspegren family, Helga de la Brache was known to make confessions and drop hints that she was in fact of high birth, and "confidences of that kind contributed greatly in making the romantic Henrika Aspegren her life long follower".

When the two women moved to Finland in 1844, Aurora Florentina had the false name de la Brache written on her passport. When she returned to Sweden in 1845, she changed her name on the passport to Anna Florentina de la Brache. She was named: "De la Brache, Anna Florentina, Miss, formerly known by the name Aurora Magnusson". She managed to have her name on her birth certificate changed from Aurora to Helga. She had her old identity, Aurora Magnusson, falsely reported as drowned. The two women can be traced to have moved around from one city to another in both Sweden and Finland. Helga was often supported by her friend Henrika Aspegren, who worked as a teacher. In 1846 they were in Turku, where they managed a girls' school advertised under the noble-sounding name of de la Brache. In the school, Helga reportedly mastered the art of fainting to avoid uncomfortable questions from parents. In 1848, they managed a girls' school in Örebro, and in 1857–59 they lived in Sala, where they managed a small fashion shop. In the autumn of 1859, they arrived in the capital of Stockholm, to commence their fraud.

== Aftermath ==
De la Brache did not receive any harsh sentence for her fraud, simply because she was never charged for the fraud she had committed. The king had her pension revoked and her claims refuted but had no interest in having her punished by charging her with fraud.

The trial in 1876–77 attracted attention both from the public and the royal family and was covered in the press. It resulted in de la Brache's loss of her pension. On 2 March 1877 she was found guilty of having registered herself under a false name, a false year of birth, and for not tax-registering herself for the year 1877, and sentenced to fines.

"Princess Helga de la Brache" spent her last years in a modest apartment in the Klara norra-area with her companion, seemingly paid for by a supporter. The two women lived a quiet life, walked in the park and ordered home food and rarely talked to other people. Helga was described as a nice old woman. In 1884, the two women were observed in the gardens of Drottningholm Palace by King Oscar II, who ordered them to be escorted from the park. Soon after, they moved from their apartment to another one in Djurgården, because they were afraid that they were going to be arrested.

During her last years, she was described as dignified and sad. According to the artist Georg von Rosen, who was present at her death bed, she was genuinely convinced of her royal birth.

She died at Djurgården, Stockholm, 1885.

== Legacy ==
In 1909, the politician Per August Johansson tried to clear her name, but the process led to nothing. The later process of the 1910s was centered around the fact, that Frederica of Baden had named the Russian czar as the guardian of her children after her divorce, and because of this, Helga de la Brache was to have been entitled to economic compensation from the Russian czar. This process ended with the Russian revolution of 1917.

Several books have been written about her.

== See also ==
- Anna Gyllander
- False Margaret
- Anna Ekelöf
- Anna Sophie Magdalene Frederikke Ulrikke
- Lolotte Forssberg
