= Sofia Drake =

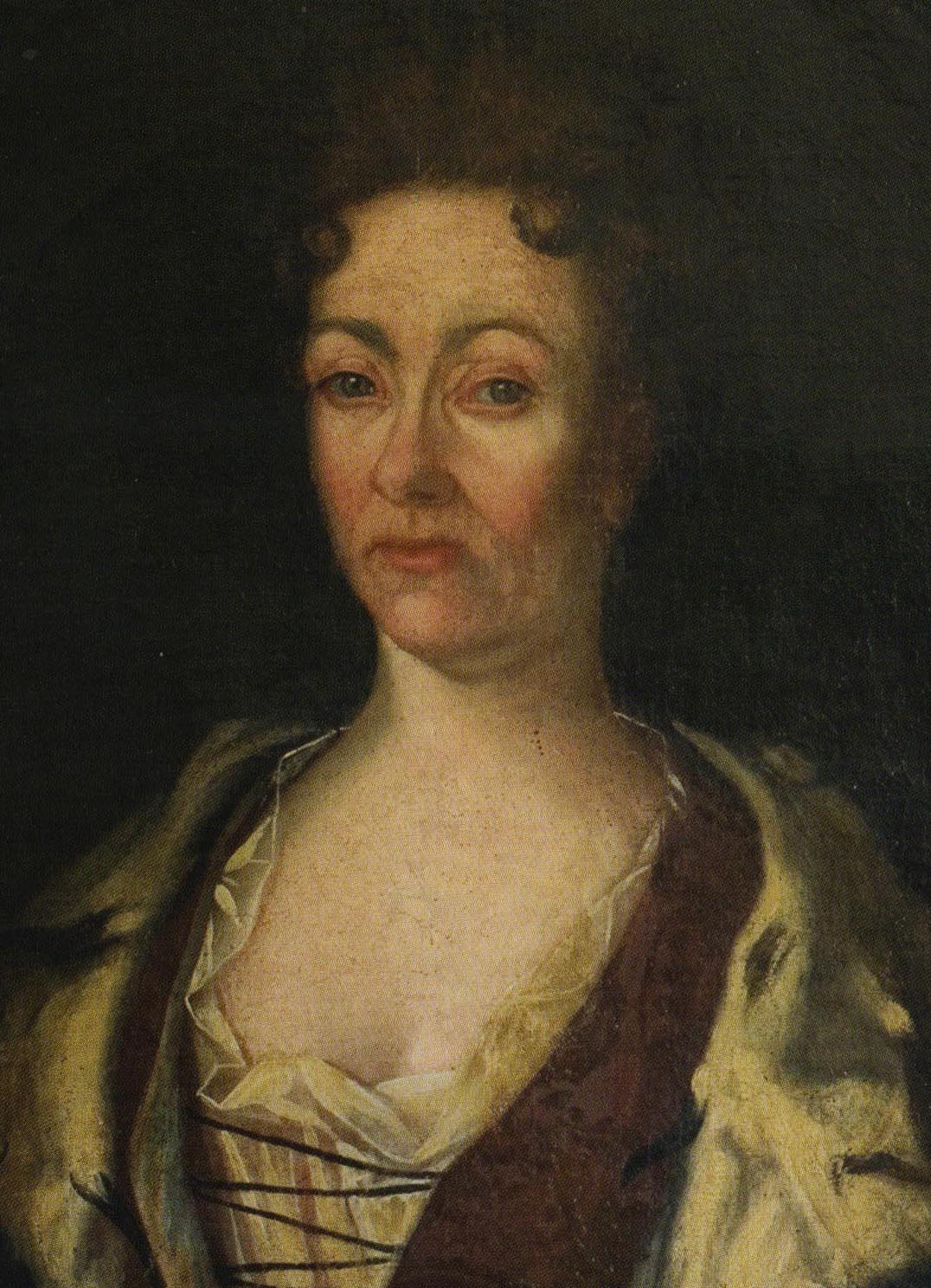
- Born: 1662
- Died: 16 September 1741 (aged 78–79)
- Spouse(s): Jon Stålhammar (m. 1689–1708; his death)
- Children: 7
- Parent(s): Johan Christersson Drake; Margareta Klingspor

Sofia Drake of Torp and Hamra (1662 - 16 September 1741) was a Swedish landowner. She is known for her correspondence with her husband, Lieutenant Colonel Jon Stålhammar, during his absence in the Great Northern War, and as the Frun på Salshult (The lady of Salshult) in the 1886 poem by Carl Snoilsky of the same name.

== Life ==
Sofia Drake was born to Colonel Johan Christersson Drake of Torp and Hamra and Margareta Klingspor. She married Lieutenant Colonel Jon Stålhammar (1659-1708) in 1689 and became the mother of seven children, four of whom survived to mature adulthood. Their families both belonged to the lesser nobility but were well off. As was the custom of many Swedish noblewomen until the late 18th century, Sofia Drake kept her birth surname after marriage.

In 1700, her spouse was called away to serve in the Great Northern War; except for a brief meeting in 1702, they were never to see each other again. Their correspondence is famous in Swedish history. Judging from their correspondence, their marriage did not seem to be an arranged marriage of the time. On one occasion, her spouse assured her that he was faithful, apparently after she had expressed concern about it. During the absence of her husband, Drake was given the responsibility of the family affairs, children, household and the estate Salshult. She is described as a respected, forceful and effective businessperson who not only managed the estate successfully but also expanded it. She continued in this role after having been widowed in 1708; her eldest son died in war service at the age of just 16 or 17 the same year, while her remaining sons were not yet mature adults.

In 1726, Sofia Drake gave refuge to her niece Ulrika Eleonora Stålhammar as a family matriarch. Stålhammar had asked for Drake's help after she was exposed as a woman while serving in the army. She had also married a woman posing as a man, which was a serious crime according to contemporary laws. Drake arranged for Stålhammar to be sent to her son's widowed mother-in-law in Värmland, adjust to wearing women's clothes and then apply for leniency. Drake made a "powerful intervention" on her behalf, which is estimated to have contributed to Stålhammar's light sentence in 1729, after which Drake gave Maria Lönman, the "husband" of Stålhammar, employment as a housekeeper at Salshult, and Stålhammar herself was sent back to Värmland. Sofia Drake's eldest surviving son and heir Otto Fredrik Stålhammar settled with his family at Salshult in 1732, by which time she would have handed over the management of the estate to him. She had her own household on Salshult, but the management of her affairs were taken over by her children in 1738, possibly due to her declining health and old age.
