= Anna Jöransdotter =

Swedish-Finnish soldier (born 1695)

Anna Jöransdotter (1695 - d. after 1715), was a Swedish-Finnish soldier. She served in the army of Charles XII of Sweden for two years during the Great Northern War, and married a woman. Her case is the perhaps most researched Swedish case of the phenomena of females impersonating males to serve in the military during the modern age. Her actions were the cause of a suggestion to introduce a law regarding homosexuality in Sweden.

== Life ==
Anna Jöransdotter served as a maid to a farmer in the Swedish province of Finland at the age of eighteen. During the time of the Russian invasion, her employer ordered her to join his son stealing from houses that were abandoned during the plague. They were discovered by a vicar from Livonia, a refugee from the advancing Russian army, and her employer then ordered her to flee dressed in male clothing. In the village of Harittu in the province of Turku, she was forcibly drafted to the army in accordance with the law that all male vagrants could be forced to serve in the army. She enlisted under the name Johan Haritu and served in the army for one and a half years. As Johan Haritu, she married the daughter of an ensign, Maja Kijhl.

This was not a love match: Maja Kijhl was pregnant at the wedding and needed a man to acknowledge the child to avoid the stigma of illegitimacy which was forced upon unmarried mothers at the time. Haritu was convinced to marry by the female owner of a public house, to which she owed money. However, Haritu refused to acknowledge the child nonetheless, as it was born so soon after the wedding. Kijhl reportedly discovered the biological gender of Haritu a couple of days after the wedding and asked her not to return after the army campaign she was committed to join.

== Trial ==
After having been drunk at a public house with an army friend, soldier Mats Kröger, she was helped to bed by him. While helping undressing her, he noticed what appeared to be breasts under the clothing. He reported this to corporal Grass, who demanded to examine her. After having confirmed that she had indeed breasts, she confessed that she was female. Despite this, Grass demanded to examine the lower part of her body to establish whether or not she was a hermaphrodite. Anna Jöransdotter was placed before the regimental court, who first investigated whether she had had sexual relations with any of the soldiers. In 1714, she was placed before a civil court. Her case was given the most extensive attention of all females posing as males who had been arrested after having served in the army and married women. The authorities asked for all courts in Sweden to give their view upon the case in the attempt to start a precedence for similar cases.

Göta Hovrätt, for example, quoted the legend of Blenda, and stated that if Anna Jönsdotter had posed as a male in a patriotic wish to serve king and country, rather than out of sinful curiosity, she should be given mercy: it also recommended body search to establish any possible hermaphrodite, which was a common procedure in these cases. Patriotism was, in fact, an argument many women posing as men would give in their defense before a court. The Stockholm court strongly condemned any one who defied the "order of God" by posing as the opposite sex rather than accepting the sex and the tasks associated with that sex that God had given. Linköping court condemned Anna Jönsdotter as they suspected her of having posed as a male in order to practice homosexuality. Most courts agreed that she should be severely punished if she had a homosexual relationship with Maja Kijhl.

However, neither Anna Jönsdotter nor Maja Kijhl claimed to have ever had any sexual contact, and when asked how they conducted themselves while sharing a bed, Anna Jönsdotter answered that she had turned her back to Kijhl. In reference to the Anna Jönsdotter case, a law was prepared to explicitly ban female homosexuality. This law was however not passed, as it was the official policy of the Swedish courts to remain silent about homosexual acts, as talk of them was believed to spread their practices.

Anna Jöransdotter was freed from the charges of "sodomy", that is to say homosexuality, and sentenced to imprisonment with hard labor. On 22 July 1715, a decision was taken in favor of her release with a warning to never attempt another similar crime.

== See also ==
- Maria Johansdotter
- Ulrika Eleonora Stålhammar

== Sources ==
- Borgström Eva, red (2002). Makalösa kvinnor: könsöverskridare i myt och verklighet. Stockholm: Alfabeta/Anamma. Libris 8707902. ISBN 91-501-0191-9 (inb.)
