= Lisbetha Olsdotter =

Swedish woman soldier (d. 1679)

Elisabeth "Lisbetha" Olsdotter (also Mats Ersson) (died November 1679) was a Swedish person who was executed on a number of different charges after having dressed as a man, served as a soldier and married a woman. On 24 October 1679, Svea Hovrätt in Stockholm brought the charges, earlier raised in Långhundra county court (Häradsting).

== The trial ==
=== Background ===
Olsdotter is reported to have been originally from Tysslinge torp in Östuna parish in Långhundra Härad. During this time, Olsdotter married the village tailor Anders Persson and had children with him. During the trial in 1679, it was reported that the marriage resulted in one surviving child of six years old. In 1674 Olsdotter left the marriage due to Persson's adultery and debauched lifestyle, and became a domestic servant to H. Schlangenfeldt in Huvudsta in Stockholm, working there for four years. According to court documents, Olsdotter was originally advised to dress as a man by a colleague, the soldier's widow, Sara, for the purpose of seducing a vivacious widow, referred to by the names Maria or Walborg. After this incident, Olsdotter successfully sought employment as a male servant in the household of the country administrator Jon Persson in Alby in Botkyrka. At this time Olsdotter used the name Mats Ersson.

In 1678, Olsdotter's employer was visited by a man who had been tasked to enlist soldiers to the king. In parallel, the brother of Olsdotter's employer, the master mariner Erik Persson Arnelii, reportedly discovered Olsdotters' secret, and used it as blackmail to threaten Olsdotter into enlisting as a soldier He assisted Olsdotter with the process of enlisting, and after having successfully done so, Olsdotter gave Arnelii a portion of salary in return for his help and silence. Olsdotter was present in all the military drills and performed all duties as a soldier.

In Easter 1679 Olsdotter married the maid Kerstin (or Kjerstin) Ersdotter in accordance with all customary traditional ceremonies of the church. After the wedding, however, Kerstin Ersdotter discovered the biological sex of her groom when attempting to have intercourse, and reported Olsdotter to the authorities for fraud. Olsdotter was arrested on Norrmalm and put on trial on 5 July 1679.

=== Charges ===
Olsdotter was put on trial for several charges:

- Abandonment of husband and children;
- Wearing of male clothing, which was forbidden in the Bible, and the crime of secular fraud by pretending to be a man;
- Bigamy, for having married when already having a husband;
- Homosexuality, and having ridiculed the holy act of marriage by marrying someone of the same sex;
- Theft, after having received salary as a soldier;
- Fraud, for taking a profession they were not capable of performing.

=== Execution ===
Olsdotter was judged guilty of the charges under the law of the act of religion from 1655: for having, with full intent, "mutilated" their gender, "mocked God and the Order of God", and fooled authorities and their "fellow Christians" by impersonating a man. Olsdotter was sentenced to death by decapitation.

The woman Olsdotter had married, Kerstin Ersdotter, claimed that she had been as fooled as every one else and was therefore judged as a victim of the crime rather than an accomplice to it. Sara and Arnelii, who had helped Olsdotter, were also arrested. The case, however, was so unusual, that the verdict would be confirmed by the highest Royal court in the country first.

The Royal court confirmed the verdict on 12 November, and ordered the priests to clarify for Olsdotter what sin had been committed in the eyes of religion. It was decided by the court, that Olsdotter would go to the execution dressed as a man, but wear female headgear. Olsdotter was decapitated on Hötorget in Stockholm in 1679.

== Similar cases ==
From the late 16th century to the early 19th century, there were several known cases in Swedish military history of people assigned female at birth dressing and presenting as men, especially in the early 18th century. The most famous case was the one of Ulrika Eleonora Stålhammar in 1728. An unnamed person, who served in the Great Northern War, was whipped as a punishment, but continued to wear male clothing until the 1740s, when they were known on the streets of Stockholm as "The Rider"; Maria Johansdotter, who was put on trial in Stockholm in 1706 for having dressed as a man and served as a parish clerk, was given a sentence of eight days in jail and then set free. Most of the cases did not lead to execution, as in the case of Lisbetha Olsdotter.

== Sources ==
- Liliequist, Jonas (2002). "Kvinnor i manskläder och åtrå mellan kvinnor: kulturella förväntningar och kvinnliga strategier i det tidigmoderna Sverige och Finland”. Makalösa kvinnor (Stockholm, 2002): sid. 93 f.. Libris 9236174 (in Swedish)
- Lisbetha Olsdotter i Wilhelmina Stålberg, Anteckningar om svenska qvinnor (1864) (in Swedish)
- Västerbottens-Kuriren 4/2 2003 (in Swedish)
- Svenska Familj-Journalen, band 18, årgång 1879 (in Swedish)
- glbtq, social sciences, Sweden
- Anna Ivarsdotter Johnsson och Leif Jonsson : Musiken i Sverige, Frihetstiden och Gustaviansk tid 1720–1810 (in Swedish)
- Borgström Eva, red (2002). Makalösa kvinnor: könsöverskridare i myt och verklighet. Stockholm: Alfabeta/Anamma. Libris 8707902. ISBN 91-501-0191-9 (inb.) (in Swedish)
- SE/SSA//0144/02/Norra förstadens kämnärsrätt/A1A Protokoll i civil- och kriminalmål/Volym 25/1679/s. 674–678
- Fur, Gunlög. “Reading Margins: Colonial Encounters in Sápmi and Lenapehoking in the Seventeenth and Eighteenth Centuries.” Feminist Studies 32, no. 3 (Fall 2006): 491–521.
