= Carl Peter Mazér =

Swedish painter (1807–1884)

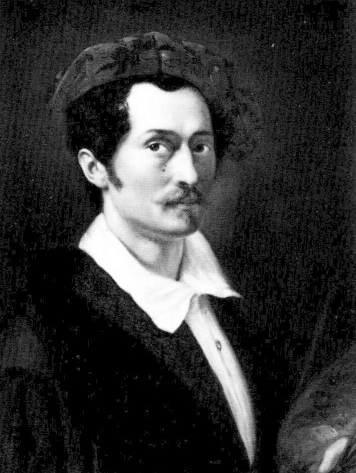
Self-portrait (date unknown)

Carl Peter Mazér (9 March 1807, Stockholm – 27 July 1884, Naples) was a Swedish painter, graphic artist, and photographer.

== Biography ==
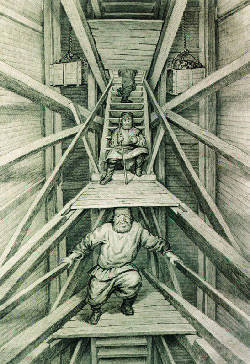
Gold mining in Eastern Siberia (1849–1850)

His father, Jean-Pierre Mazér (died 1829), was a silk weaver and stocking maker, originally from France. Johan Mazer, a noted merchant and musician, was his half-brother from his father's first marriage. At an early age, he became interested in painting, and was able to study with Gustaf Erik Hasselgren at the Royal Swedish Academy of Fine Arts. In 1825, he accompanied his father to Paris and took lessons from Antoine-Jean Gros; becoming his assistant and helping to paint the backgrounds on historical scenes.

During the July Revolution of 1830, he manned the barricades. From 1833 to 1835, he was in Italy, then returned to Sweden. His first exhibition, of twenty-five paintings, took place at the Royal Academy in 1836.

In 1837, he spent some time in Finland, then went to Saint Petersburg. He would eventually spend fifteen years in Russia; living in Moscow and Yaroslavl, where he worked as a drawing teacher. He also travelled in barges down the Volga, from Nizhny Novgorod to Astrakhan, making sketches. His best known work from that period is a posthumous portrait of Alexander Pushkin, commissioned by Pavel Nashchokin, a close friend of Pushkin's and a noted art collector. In 1848, he visited Siberia, where he created a series of portraits of the revolutionaries who had been exiled there. In Tobolsk, when he attempted to paint a group portrait of Alexander Muravyov and his family, the police stopped him and sent him out of the city,

At the beginning of 1851, he opened a daguerreotype studio in Moscow, where he worked until the end of 1852; making copies of art works as well as taking portrait photographs. After returning to Stockholm in 1854, he had difficulty making a living from his art, and became exclusively involved with photography; creating a professional manual in 1864. He moved to Paris in 1876. After staying there for two years, he moved to Naples, where he died in 1884, aged seventy-six.

His works may be seen at the State Historical Museum, the State Literary Museum, and the Hermitage, as well as several smaller ones. His unpublished memoirs and other manuscripts are in the collection of the Nationalmuseum, Stockholm.

== Selected paintings ==
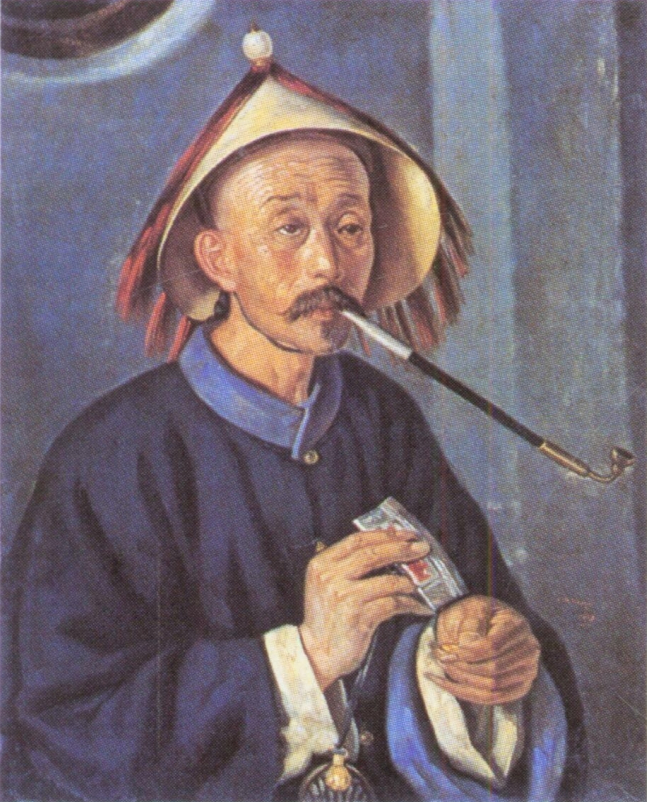
Portrait of a
Chinese Man

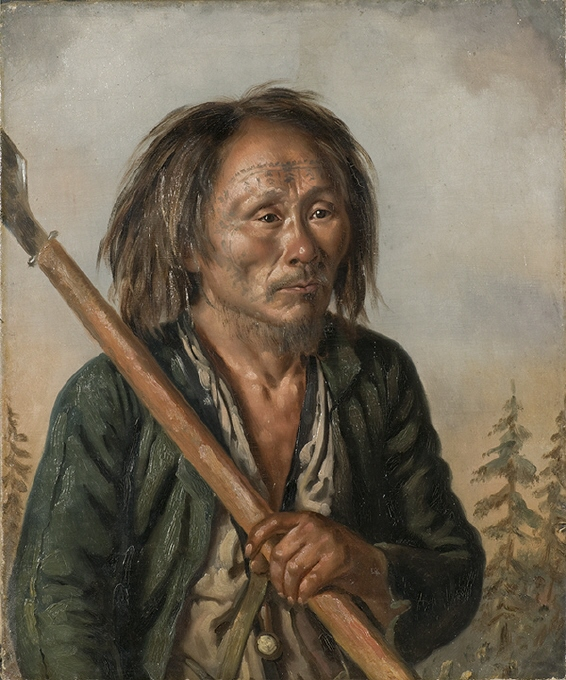
Portrait of a
Tungusic Man

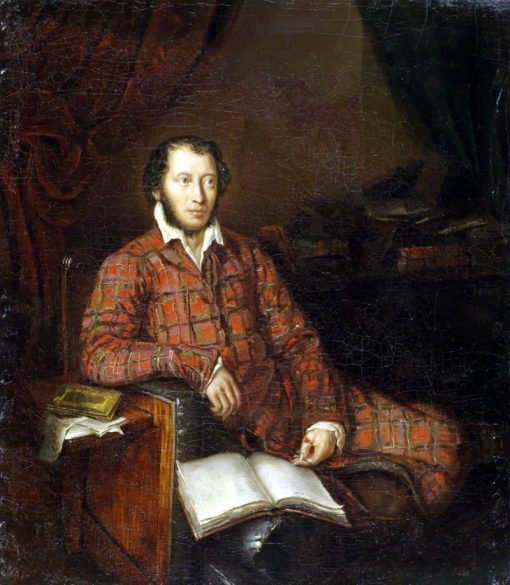
Alexander Pushkin

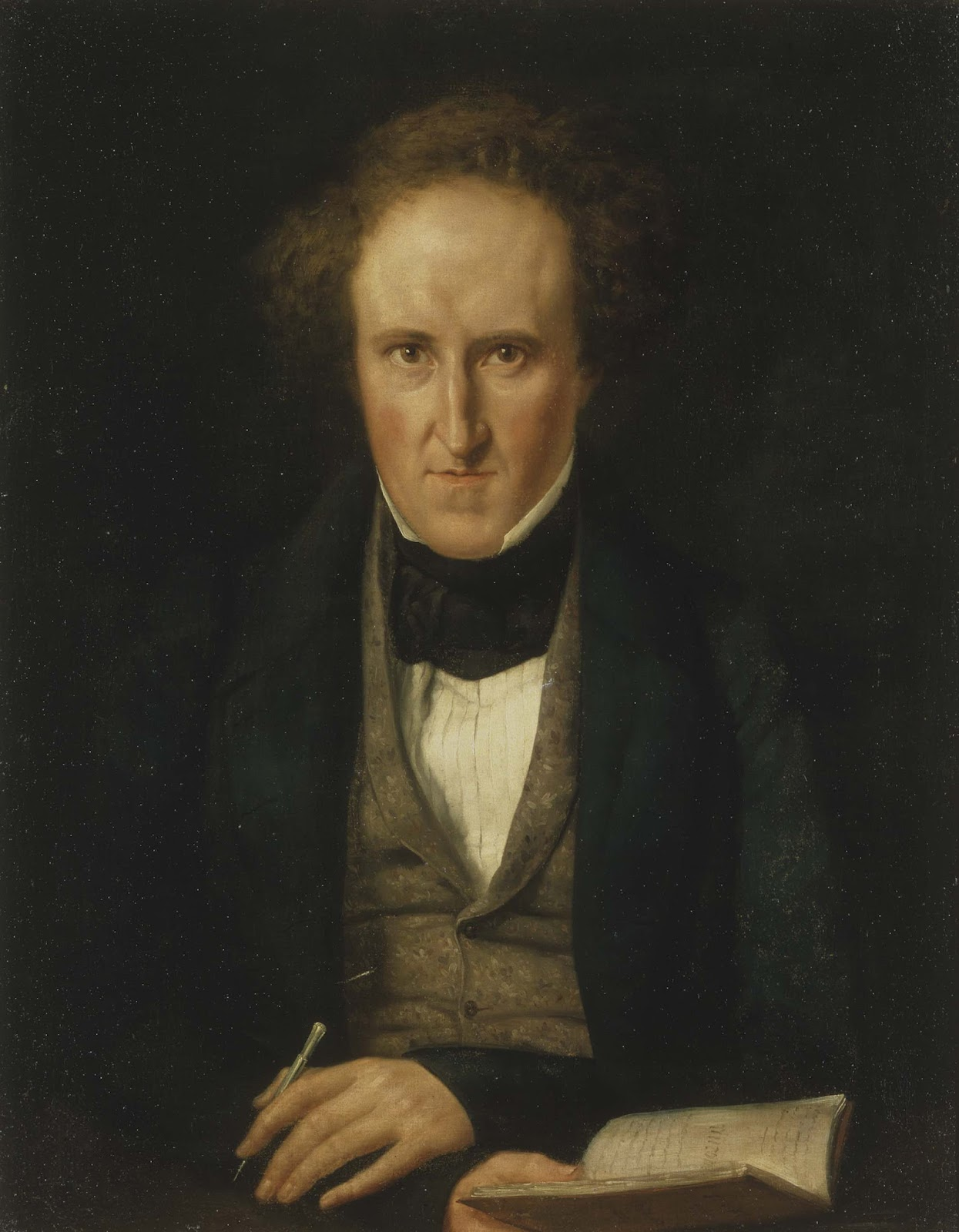
Carl Jonas Love Almqvist

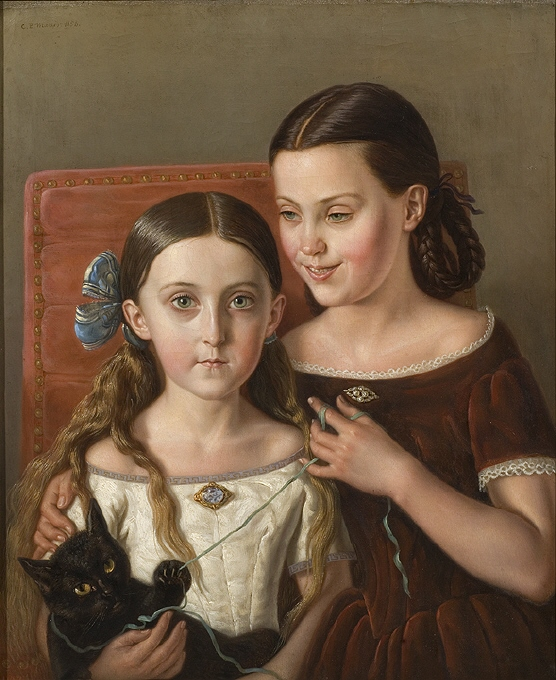
Sigrid and Anna Mazer
(his nieces)

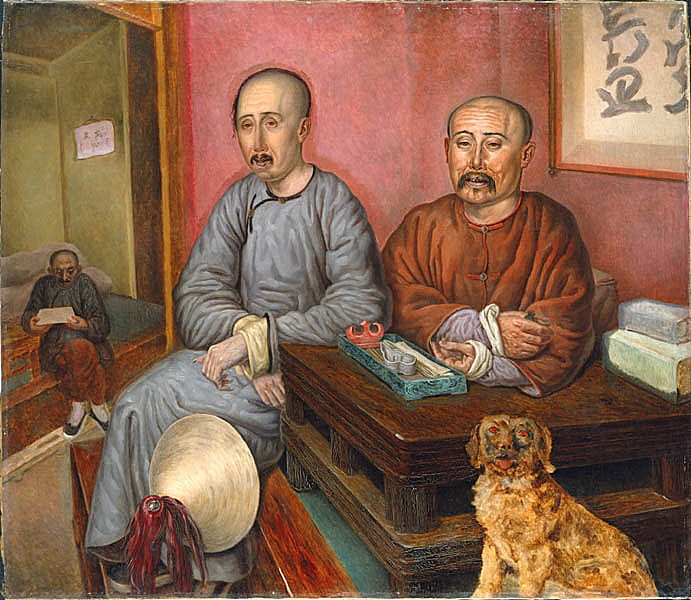
Chinese Tradesmen
