= The Queen's Tiara =

Novel by Carl Jonas Love Almqvist

The Queen's Tiara (Swedish: Drottningens juvelsmycke, lit. 'The Queen's Jewels') is a classic Swedish novel by Carl Jonas Love Almquist.

It is the fourth instalment in the series of novels known as Törnrosens bok ('The Book of the Thorn Rose') and was published in 1834. Drottningens juvelsmycke was the first original historical novel to be written in Sweden, and features one of Swedish literature's most enduringly popular characters, the intersex Tintomara.

== Plot ==
The novel is set in 1792 and weaves the story of the beautiful but sexless androgyne Tintomara around the assassination of King Gustav III of Sweden, "a vigorous patron of the arts" commonly nicknamed "The Theatre King", on the stage of Stockholm's Royal Swedish Opera at a masked ball in 1792.

Tintomara is employed by the Royal Swedish Ballet to function as the centrepiece of their lavish spectacles. Tintomara's true gender is never made clear, but Tintomara is referred to by the pronoun "She". She is described as beautiful and is often the object of passion for both men and women.

Tintomara is portrayed as the secret half sibling to the underage King, Gustav IV Adolf of Sweden. Her father was Count Adolf Fredrik Munck af Fulkila, and her mother was the actress Clara: Count Adolf Fredrik Munck af Fulkila was said to be the biological father of the king and lover of the Queen, Sophia Magdalena of Denmark.

Passing as a girl, Tintomara is involved in the notorious assassination of the King. On the same night, she steals the Queen's tiara in order to show it to her mother. Tintomara is then taken under the protection of a Baroness, who hides her on her country estate, where Tintomara passes as a boy. In the country, she becomes the love object of two women, Amanda and Adolfine, the daughters of the Baroness; and two men, the nobles Ferdinand and Clas-Henrik, who earlier courted the sisters and who are now concealing their involvement in the assassination.

Tintomara is killed by Ferdinand during a performance planned as a spectacular entertainment for the court which ends in disaster.

The novel's most famous line is spoken by Tintomara's dying mother, Clara: "Tintomara, two things are white - Innocence and Arsenic". She continues "You have the Innocence - I have the Arsenic".

== Trivia ==
Tintomara is said to have been inspired by the daughter of Giovanna Bassi, Johanna Fredrika (1787–1810), who was presumed to be fathered by Count Adolf Fredrik Munck af Fulkila. By persistent rumors, the count was said to be the true father of Gustav IV Adolf of Sweden; Bassi's daughter was said to have a strong resemblance to the King, who might have been her half-brother.

Another role model and source of inspiration was reportedly the contemporary transsexual Andreas Bruce.

== People ==
- Adolfine - daughter of the baroness
- Amanda - daughter of the baroness
- The ballet master - employer of Tintomara
- Benjamin Cohen - money lender
- Clara - mother of Tintomara
- Clas Henrik - a young noble conspirator
- Emmanuel - brother of Tintomara
- Ferdinand - a young noble conspirator
- The Baroness - protector of Tintomara and mother of Adolfine and Amanda
- The Uncle - brother of the Baroness
- Tintomara - the main character

== Real people in the novel ==
- Johan Jacob Anckarström
- Gustav III of Sweden
- Gustav IV Adolf of Sweden – portrayed as the half-brother of Tintomara.
- Gustaf Adolf Reuterholm – attempts to seduce Tintomara
- Hedwig Elizabeth Charlotte of Holstein-Gottorp
- Charles XIII of Sweden – attempts to seduce Tintomara
- Magdalena Rudenschöld – an ally in Tintomara's attempt to escape persecution

== Film adaptation ==
A Swedish-Danish film production entitled Tintomara was released in 1970.
