= A Voyage to Terra Australis =

1814 book by Matthew Flinders

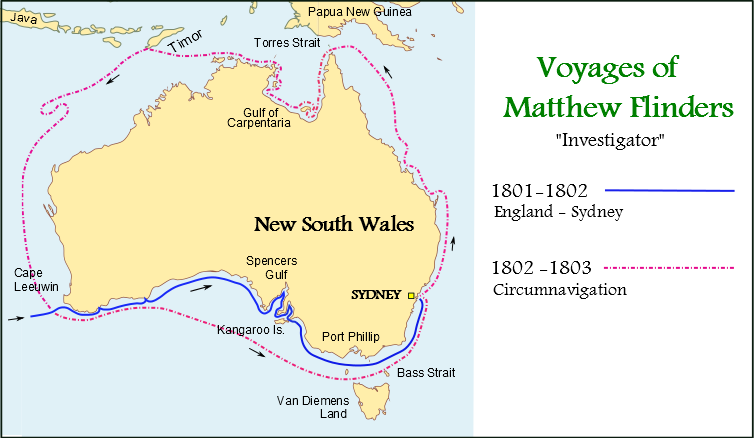
- Map showing Matthew Flinders' voyages aboard HMS Investigator
- Author: Matthew Flinders
- Language: English
- Publisher: G. and W. Nicol
- Publication date: 1814
- Publication place: England
- Media type: Print
- Pages: 2 volumes
- Text: A Voyage to Terra Australis at Wikisource

A Voyage to Terra Australis: Undertaken for the Purpose of Completing the Discovery of that Vast Country, and Prosecuted in the Years 1801, 1802, and 1803, in His Majesty's Ship the Investigator was a sea voyage journal written by British mariner and explorer Matthew Flinders. It describes his circumnavigation of the Australian continent in the early years of the 19th century, and his imprisonment by the French on the island of Mauritius from 1804 to 1810.

== Circumnavigation ==
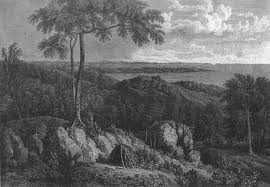
Entrance to Port Lincoln in South Australia; engraving by John Pye.

The book told in great detail of his explorations and included maps and drawings of the profiles of unknown coastline areas of what Flinders called "Terra Australis Incognita." By this, he was referring to the great unknown Southern continent that had been sighted and partly mapped by prominent earlier mariners such as Captain James Cook. The ship Flinders commanded, HMS Investigator, was a 334-ton sloop. Up until this time the circumnavigation of Australia which was necessary to prove it was a single continent land mass, had never been completed. He achieved this by circling the island continent, leaving Sydney in July 1802, heading north, through Torres Strait, across the top of the continent westward, and south along the western coastline. Flinders reached and named Cape Leeuwin on 6 December 1802, and proceeded to make a survey along the southern coast of the Australian mainland, and then completing the journey, arrived back in Sydney in June 1803, despite the dangerous condition of his ship.

== Returning home to England ==
Flinders' further description of imprisonment on Mauritius preceded his final return to England in October 1810 in poor health: despite this he immediately resumed work preparing A Voyage to Terra Australis and his maps for publication. In January 1811 approval for publication of his narrative was given by the Admiralty, but payment was restricted to the atlas and charts sections. Flinders was responsible for funding the major work. The full title of this book which was first published in London in July 1814 was given, as was common at the time, a synoptic description: "A Voyage to Terra Australis: undertaken for the purpose of completing the discovery of that vast country, and prosecuted in the years 1801, 1802, and 1803 in His Majesty's ship the Investigator, and subsequently in the armed vessel Porpoise and Cumberland Schooner. With an account of the shipwreck of the Porpoise, arrival of the Cumberland at Mauritius, and imprisonment of the commander during six years and a half in that island."

== Publications ==
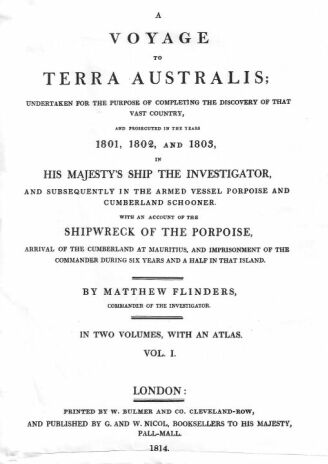
A Voyage to Terra Australis: title page

Original publications of the Atlas to Flinders' Voyage to Terra Australis are held at the Mitchell Library in Sydney, Australia, as a portfolio that accompanied the book and included engravings of 16 maps, 4 plates of views, and 10 plates of Australian flora.

The book was republished in three volumes in 1966 accompanied by a reproduction of the portfolio. Flinders' map of Terra Australis was first published in January 1814 (Note: All maps published by the British H/Office are dated.) and the remaining maps were published before his atlas and book. On 19 July 1814, the day after the book and atlas was published, Matthew Flinders died, at the age of 40.

- Flinders, Matthew (1814). A Voyage to Terra Australis: Undertaken for the Purpose of Completing the Discovery of that Vast Country, and Prosecuted in the Years 1801, 1802, and 1803, in His Majesty's Ship the Investigator. London: G. Nicol & Son. LCCN 04032254. OCLC 1931791. Wikidata Q133873351.
  - Flinders, Matthew (1814). A Voyage to Terra Australis: Undertaken for the Purpose of Completing the Discovery of that Vast Country, and Prosecuted in the Years 1801, 1802, and 1803, in His Majesty's Ship the Investigator. Vol. 1. London: G. Nicol & Son. Wikidata Q19027014.
  - Flinders, Matthew (1814). A Voyage to Terra Australis: Undertaken for the Purpose of Completing the Discovery of that Vast Country, and Prosecuted in the Years 1801, 1802, and 1803, in His Majesty's Ship the Investigator. Vol. 2. London: G. Nicol & Son. Wikidata Q133863530.
- Flinders, Matthew (1966) [1814]. A Voyage to Terra Australis: Undertaken for the Purpose of Completing the Discovery of that Vast Country, and Prosecuted in the Years 1801, 1802, and 1803, in His Majesty's Ship the Investigator. Adelaide: Libraries Board of South Australia. LCCN 66070225. OCLC 4565366. OL 38607138M. Wikidata Q133875246.
- Flinders, Matthew (2004). Choat, Colin (ed.). A Voyage to Terra Australis: Undertaken for the Purpose of Completing the Discovery of that Vast Country, and Prosecuted in the Years 1801, 1802, and 1803, in His Majesty's Ship the Investigator. Project Gutenberg. Wikidata Q133873326.
  - Flinders, Matthew (17 July 2004). Choat, Colin (ed.). A Voyage to Terra Australis: Undertaken for the Purpose of Completing the Discovery of that Vast Country, and Prosecuted in the Years 1801, 1802, and 1803, in His Majesty's Ship the Investigator. Vol. 1. Project Gutenberg. Wikidata Q133873318.
  - Flinders, Matthew (6 August 2004). Choat, Colin (ed.). A Voyage to Terra Australis: Undertaken for the Purpose of Completing the Discovery of that Vast Country, and Prosecuted in the Years 1801, 1802, and 1803, in His Majesty's Ship the Investigator. Vol. 2. Project Gutenberg. Wikidata Q133873319.

== See also ==
- European and American voyages of scientific exploration: 1801–1803: HMS Investigator
- General remarks, geographical and systematical, on the botany of Terra Australis
- History of Australia
