= Maria Johansdotter =

Swedish harpist, folk music player and parish clerk (fl. 1706)

Maria Johansdotter, or Maja Jansdotter, also known as Magnus Johansson (born 1683), was a Swedish spelman (a player of Swedish folk music) and parish clerk. She was the first woman parish clerk in Sweden. She was put on trial for homosexuality and for having posed as a man in 1705.

== Life ==
Maria Johansdotter arrived in Stockholm from Åland with her stepfather during the Great Northern War. She later stated, that in her home parish she often dressed in trousers and performed both male and female tasks. In Stockholm, she performed tasks normally given to men on farms outside of the capital. She also became a well known musician in the capital, when she played the harp as a spelman on the taverns of Gamla stan. Although she wore trousers, she still used her female name. One evening, she was given identity papers under the male name Magnus Johansson by a guest at a tavern. After this, she dressed completely in male clothing and stated to her employer that she was a hermaphrodite and would henceforth live as a man. She later moved to another part of the city's surroundings where she was unknown as a woman.

Partially, this was caused by the fact that the professions open to men were better paid. As a man, she supported herself as a male farmhand and started to train as a shoe maker. She was a good singer, and was employed in Lovö as a parish clerk, thus becoming the first female parish clerk in her country. In her private life, she became entangled in a string of love affairs with maids to an extent that she was given a bad reputation for being a promiscuous man. She was eventually revealed because, "The maids begun to care for her too much". After several love affairs, she fell genuinely in love with the maid Maria Andersdotter. Andersdotter was warned by her mother that there were rumors that Johansdotter was a woman, but Andersdotter stated that she did not care and accepted Johansdotter's proposal of marriage. Johansdotter promised Andersdotter that she would reveal the truth as soon as she had completed her education as a shoe maker. Maria Johansdotter then received a letter from the vicar in a parish where she was known as a woman. The couple decided to commit suicide together, but when they were discovered by the employer of Johansdotter, Maria Johansdotter contacted the vicar and reported herself.

== Trial ==
Maria Johansdotter was put on trial at Svartö in 1705. The vicar of Åkers socken, Johan Acrelius, testified that she had often been dressed as a man during her employment at Tuna manor. Johansdotter stated that it was more common on Åland for women to perform male tasks. She said she often performed both male and female tasks when she grew up and liked the male better, and that when she took a male name, she had decided to love only beautiful girls in the future. Maria Johansdotter represents a unique case among the women put on trial for having posed as men, as she freely stated that she was guilty of all charges without any display of remorse or fear for the court. She admitted that she had love affairs with her own gender, but stated that she had only danced and kissed the women for fun and that she had not harmed them, that is to say impregnated them. Maria Johansdotter was sentenced by Svea Hovrätt in 1706 to eight days prison on water and bread and Uppenbar kyrkoplikt for having dressed in male attire.

In early-modern Sweden, cases of women disguising themselves as men were documented and occasionally prosecuted with a death punishments imposed on the convicted in accordance to the religious code of 1655. Normally it was about women serving as soldiers, but Maria Johansdotter was not unique for having posed as a man to gain access to civilian professions. In Säby in 1571, a shoe maker apprentice was discovered to be a pregnant woman, and Karin Johansdotter from Kangasala in Finland served as a male servant in 1723-1726 because the salary was better for a man. The usher Petter Cederlöf, was discovered to be a female after his death in 1780, then engaged to a woman, and Gustafva Juliana Cederström (1746–1801) became widely known for having performed several different male professions reserved for men by posing as a man.

== Legacy ==
The story of Maria Johansdotter have been made into a play by the musician Anders Peev and Johan Theodorsson from the Musikteater Unna (Unna Music Theater). The play was first shown at the Stockholm Pride 2012, and has been played at the International Story Festival in Rome 2013.

== See also ==
- Anna Jöransdotter
- Anna Ekelöf

== Sources ==
- Anna Ivarsdotter Johnsson and Leif Jonsson (in Swedish) : Musiken i Sverige. Frihetstiden och Gustaviansk tid 1720-1810 (Music in Sweden. The age of Liberty and the Gustavian age 1720–1810)
- Wilhelmina Stålberg(in Swedish): Anteckningar om svenska qvinnor (Notes of Swedish women)
- Borgström Eva(in Swedish): Makalösa kvinnor: könsöverskridare i myt och verklighet (Marvelous women: genderbenders in myth and reality) Alfabeta/Anamma, Stockholm 2002. ISBN 91-501-0191-9 (inb.). Libris 8707902.
