= Carl Jonas Love Almqvist =

Swedish author (1793–1866)

Carl Jonas Love Almquist by an unknown artist

Carl Jonas Love Ludvig Almqvist (28 November 1793 – 26 September 1866) was a Swedish author, romantic poet, romantic critic of political economy, realist, composer and social critic.

== Biography ==
Carl Jonas Love Almqvist was born in Stockholm, Sweden. He was the son of War Commissioner Karl Gustav Almqvist (1768–1846) and Birgitta Lovisa Gjörwell (1768–1806), daughter of journalist and editor Carl Christoffer Gjörwell Sr. (1731–1811). Almqvist's younger half-brother was Director-General Gustavus Fridolf Almquist (1814–1886), who was the father of Agnes Hammarskjöld.

He studied at Uppsala University and then worked as a clerk in Stockholm. In 1823 he gave up his post, and in the autumn of the following year moved to Adolfsfors-Köla in northern Värmland where he and some friends, inspired by Jean-Jacques Rousseau, intended to live out a rural idyll. It was there in 1824, that he married Anna Maria Andersdotter Lundström (1799–1868) and had two children. In 1828, he became a teacher at the experimental school Nya Elementar in Stockholm, where he was rector there from 1829 to 1841. Almqvist was ordained as a pastor in 1837, but could not find work, and after publishing Det går an in 1839 gave up that career altogether; supporting himself by working for various newspapers (including Aftonbladet and Jönköpingsbladet).

In June 1851 Almqvist fled Sweden on suspicion of fraud and poisoning attempts against an elderly usurer named Johan Jacob von Scheven, to whom he owed 18000 riksdaler. He arrived in the United States at the end of August and traveled widely under the name Lewis Gustawi. In Philadelphia, on the third anniversary of his departure from Stockholm, he bigamously married a 69-year-old guest-house proprietress, Emma Nugent. In 1865 Almqvist tried to return to Sweden, but only got as far as Bremen, where he lived under the name of E. Westerman and died in 1866.

He wrote many books and poems. Some dealt with his radical views on society and politics; in his novel Drottningens juvelsmycke, his main character, Tintomara, is neither male nor female, and arouses both men and women to fall in love, and in his novel Det går an, a woman lives with a man without being married to him. These books caused the church and state to condemn him and call him a dangerous revolutionary. However, he still maintained influence with his writings, and he is counted as one of the foremost Swedish social reformers of the 19th century.

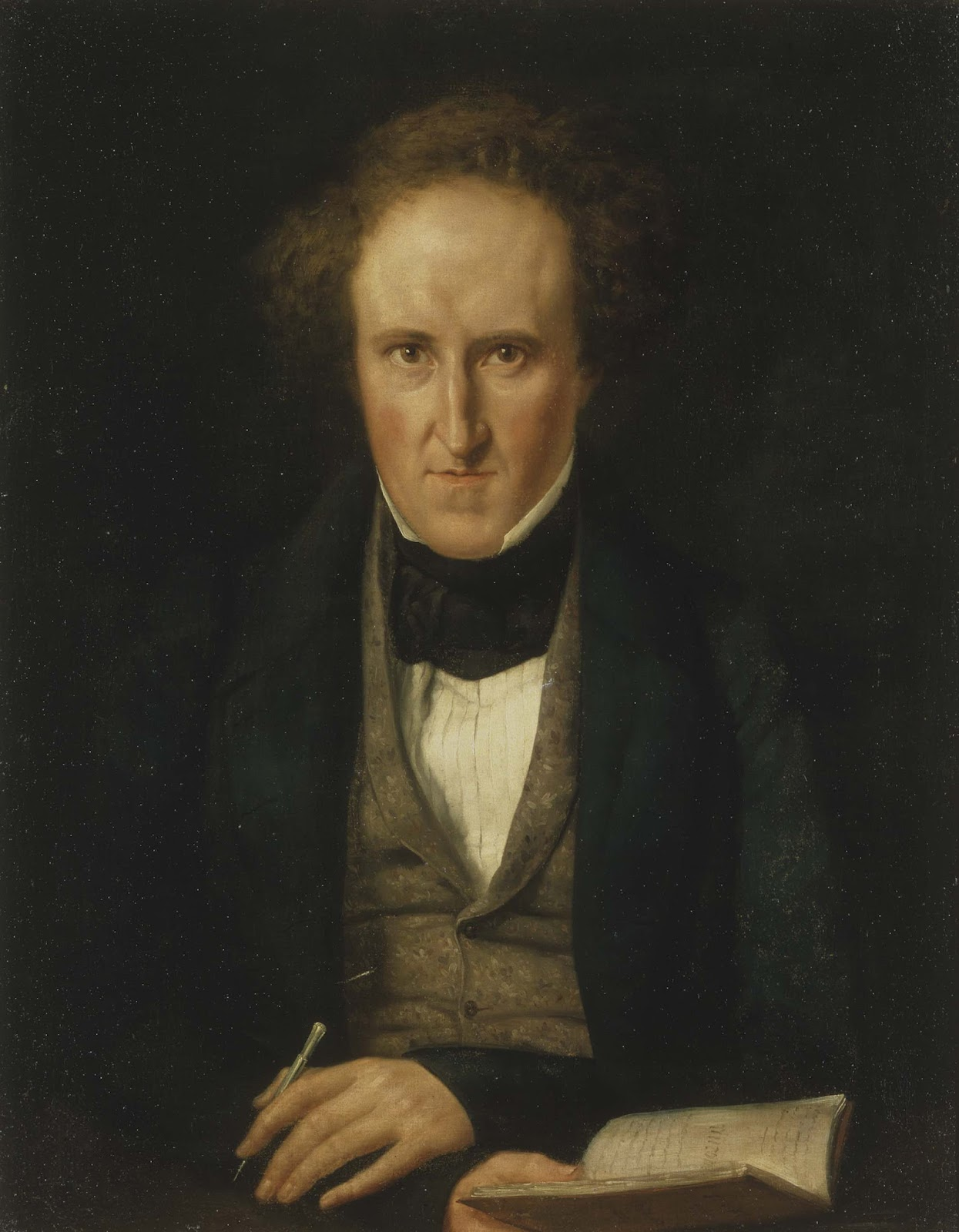
Portrait of Almqvist by Carl Peter Mazer (c.1835)

== Works ==
Many of his writings are included in the long series Törnrosens bok (1832–1851). Some of his musical compositions have been recorded.

- Parjumouf Saga ifrån Nya Holland (Stockholm, 1817), an early novel, published anonymously. It is the first Swedish novel set in Australia (which is termed Nya Holland, or New Holland, and also Ulimaroa)
- Amorina (1822, rev. 1839), novel
- Drottningens juvelsmycke (1834), novel.
  - Translated as The Queen's Diadem by Yvonne Sandstroem (1992)
- Ormus och Ariman (1839)
- Om poesi i sak (1839), essay on poetics
- Amorina eller historien om de fyra 1839
- Det går an (1838), novel.
  - Translated as Sara Videbeck by Adolph B. Benson (1919)
- Songes (1849), poetry.
- Svensk Språklära (1854)

=== Sara Videbeck ===
Sara Videbeck is the English translation of Almqvist's most famous work, whose Swedish title is Det går an. In it, sergeant Albert falls in love with Sara Videbeck, a glazier's daughter, during a steamboat trip between Stockholm and Lidköping. Sara is interested but outlines an egalitarian marriage without a formal wedding ceremony and without shared property. The novel ends with her asking, "Will this all do, Albert?" ("Går allt detta an, Albert?"), and his answer, "It will do" ("Det går an" ). The novel is primarily an attack on lifelong marriage as an institution and the inability of women to become financially independent. The book's social tendency aroused lively debate and "det-går-an literature" became a concept. (Fredrika Bremer's contribution was the 1843 A Diary.) The controversy over the work, however, forced Almqvist out of his post as rector at the New Elementary School, Stockholm.
