= Ulimaroa =

Obsolete name of Australia

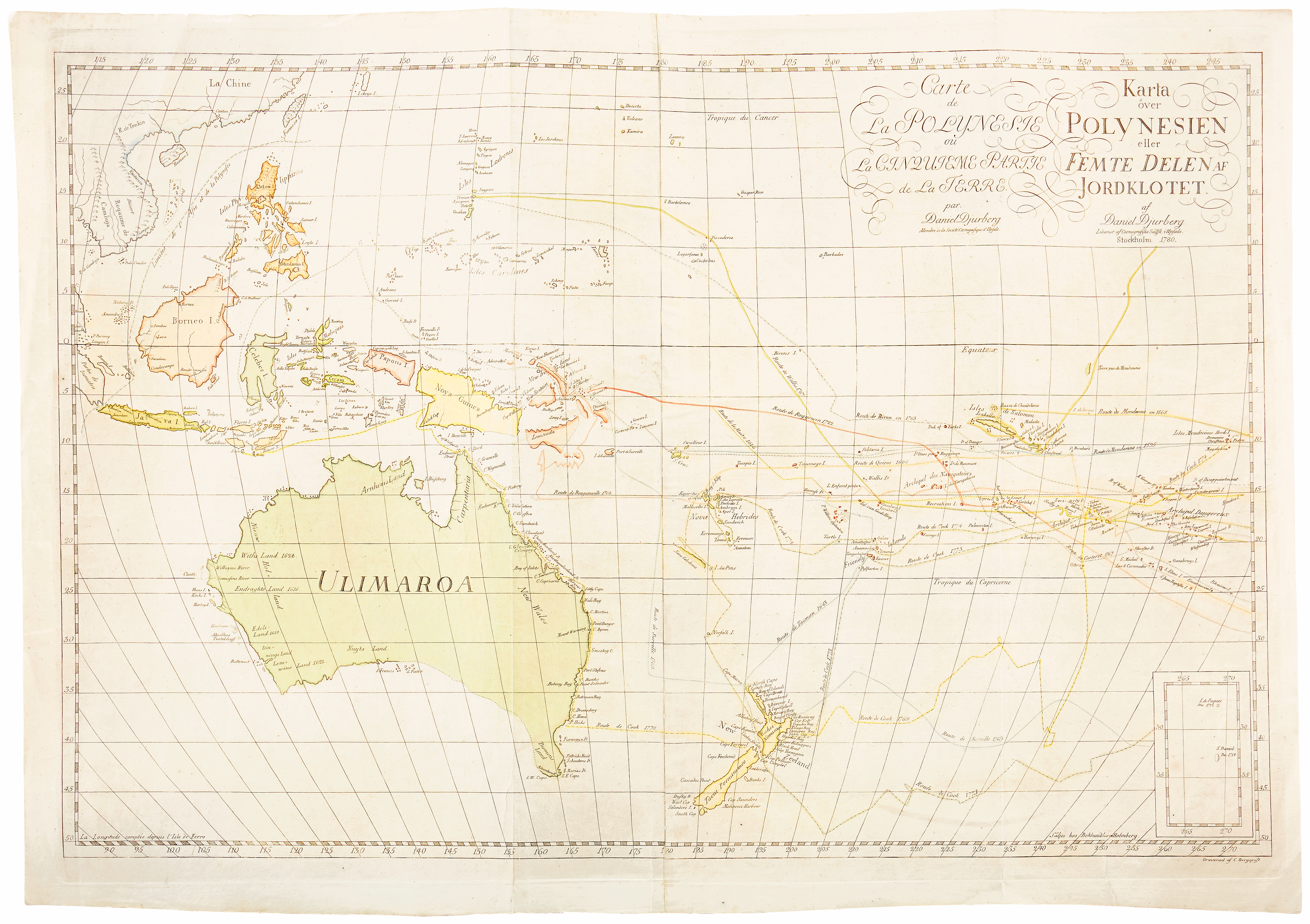
Djurberg's map of "Polynesia, or the fifth part of the globe" (1780), showing Ulimaroa

Ulimaroa is a place mentioned in the journals of James Cook and Joseph Banks. Cook and Banks heard of it from the Māori, who claimed that it lay many days' sail from New Zealand. The Swedish geographer Daniel Djurberg identified it with Australia, and Ulimaroa briefly became an alternative name for the continent as a result of this.

== History ==
Cook and Banks picked up the name from a Māori they met in Queen Charlotte Sound. The Māori was asked if a ship like the Endeavour had ever been seen in New Zealand before. He replied in the negative, but said that his country had once been visited by a boat from Ulimaroa. (Note: The name is spelled Olhemaroa by Cook and Olimaroa by Banks, only becoming Ulimaroa in John Hawkesworth's account of the expedition (1773).) When asked where Ulimaroa was, he pointed north and said that it would take many days to sail there. This accorded with an earlier report Cook had heard in Doubtless Bay, where a party of Māori had told him of a large country lying to the north-northwest, a month's journey away. Some of their ancestors had sailed there, returning with depleted numbers. The inhabitants were said to live on pork, which made Tupia wonder why they hadn't brought any pigs back for themselves.

In his Geografi (1776), Daniel Djurberg applied the name to Australia on the assumption that this was the "large country" the Māori were talking about. Ulimaroa, he argued, was a far more fitting name than the then-current New Holland, since the new continent bore little resemblance to Holland in Europe. Other geographers followed Djurberg's lead, and Ulimaroa continued to appear on maps as a name for Australia until about 1819.

Modern scholarship has cast doubt upon Djurberg's assumptions. His claim that the name means "big red land" in the Māori language has no foundation in fact. It could instead come from ʻo Rimaroa, meaning "the long arm". Rather than referring to Australia, it could refer to New Caledonia or one of the Fijian islands. This is especially likely in view of the reference to pigs, which were not found in Australia at the time. Some, however, have surmised that the "pigs" mentioned by the Māori could in fact be wombats, which would make Djurberg's identification tenable.

== See also ==
- Name of Australia
- Aotearoa
- Terra Australis
- New Holland (Australia)

== Sources ==
- Tent, Jan; Geraghty, Paul (2012). "Where in the World is Ulimaroa? Or, How a Pacific Island Became the Australian Continent". The Journal of Pacific History. 47 (1): 1–20. doi:10.1080/00223344.2011.647396. JSTOR 41710203.
