= General remarks, geographical and systematical, on the botany of Terra Australis =

1814 paper written by Robert Brown on the botany of Australia

General remarks, geographical and systematical, on the botany of Terra Australis is an 1814 paper written by Robert Brown on the botany of Australia. It is significant as an early treatment of the biogeography and floristics of the flora of Australia; for its contributions to plant systematics, including the erection of eleven currently accepted families; and for its presentation of a number of important observations on flower morphology.

== Background ==
Brown had been botanist during Matthew Flinders' 1801–02 circumnavigation of Australia, and on returning in England in 1805 he was charged with publishing a flora of the continent. In 1810 he published the first volume of a Latin flora, Prodromus florae Novae Hollandiae et Insulae Van Diemen, but this suffered from very poor sales, and Brown abandoned plans to produce further volumes. The following year Flinders began preparing his account of the voyage, and Brown was invited to contribute a botanical appendix. Brown took the opportunity to include numerous observations that must once have been intended for a second volume of his Prodromus.

== Content ==
General remarks was published as Appendix III of Matthew Flinders' A Voyage to Terra Australis, and also simultaneously issued as an offprint with separate pagination.

The paper begins with a brief summary of the voyage, followed by an acknowledgement of the specimen collections to which Brown was given access prior to the voyage. Brown then presents a broad summary of the floristics of the continent, noting that the proportion of dicotyledons is much smaller than would be expected in such a climate and latitude.

It then provides a systematic arrangement of the Australian plants, broadly following the system presented by Augustin Pyramus de Candolle in his 1813 Théorie élémentaire de la botanique. Thirteen new families are erected, of which eleven remain current today. These are: Celastraceae, Casuarinaceae, Combretaceae, Cunoniaceae, Haloragidaceae, Hypoxidaceae, Loganiaceae, Pittosporaceae and Rhizophoraceae. He also divided Leguminosae (or Fabaceae, the legume family) into three; although Leguminosae has been restored, Brown had recognised what is now viewed as the fundamental division of the family, and his three families are retained as the Leguminosae subfamilies Caesalpinioideae, Mimosoideae and Faboideae.

Throughout the paper, Brown makes morphological observations that have since been described by David Mabberley as "all brilliant and thought-provoking". These include the first explanation of the unusual construction of the "flower" (actually a pseudanthium) of Euphorbia; an explanation of the construction of the flowers of Eucalyptus; and observations on the venation of the petals of Asteraceae. He also expands on previous remarks on the fruits of conifers, and explains in detail his previous decision to separate the Poaceae into what are now Pooideae and Panicoideae.

The paper concludes with comments on the vegetation and floristics of Australia, including comparisons with other continents. There is an interesting historical footnote in Brown's use of the term Australian throughout the paper. Although the word "Australia" had been used on occasion, this is the first known use of the adjectival form.

== Reception ==
There is little information available on how the paper was received, but in an 1890 eulogy on Brown, Joseph Dalton Hooker remarked that the paper was

"one of his most important contributions to Botany, for the number, variety and suggestiveness of new facts, observations, and generalizations it contains".

== Publication history ==
This work has appeared in the following publications:

- Brown, Robert (1814). "Appendix III: General Remarks, Geographical and Systematical, on the Botany of Terra Australis". A Voyage to Terra Australis: Undertaken for the Purpose of Completing the Discovery of that Vast Country, and Prosecuted in the Years 1801, 1802, and 1803, in His Majesty's Ship the Investigator. By Flinders, Matthew. Vol. 2. London: G. Nicol & Son. pp. 533–612. Wikidata Q133863530.
- Brown, Robert (1814). General Remarks, Geographical and Systematical, on the Botany of Terra Australis.
- Nees von Esenbeck, C. G. D., ed. (1827). "General Remarks, Geographical and Systematical, on the Botany of Terra Australis". Robert Brown's Vermischte botanische Schiften. Vol. 1. pp. 1–166.
- J. J. Bennett, ed. (1866–68). "General Remarks, Geographical and Systematical, on the Botany of Terra Australis". The Miscellaneous Botanical Works of Robert Brown, Esq., D.C.L., F.R.S. Vol. 1. pp. 2–89.
