= Susan M. Butler =

Australian lexicographer

Susan M. Butler AO
- Born: 1948 (age 77–78)

Academic background
- Education: University of Sydney

Academic work
- Discipline: Lexicographer
- Notable works: Macquarie Dictionary (editor)

Susan Margaret Butler AO (born 1948) is an Australian lexicographer, who was the editor and publisher of the Macquarie Dictionary of Australian English from its first edition in 1981 until its seventh in 2017, and her retirement in 2018.

Butler intended to become a composer, and majored in Latin and Greek at the University of Sydney before working in a factory. In 1970, she was employed by Jacaranda Press as a research assistant on a proposed dictionary of Australian English. Over the next ten years, Butler became the dictionary's editor, and published its first edition in 1981. In addition to the Macquarie, Butler has written several lexicographical books including The Dinkum Dictionary: The Origins of Australian Words and The Aitch Factor: Adventures in Australian English.

In 2018, Butler was made an Officer of the Order of Australia in the Queen's Birthday Honours for "distinguished service to the community as a lexicographer and author, as a facilitator of academic discourse on Australian English language, and to commercial publishing".
