= Stråssa =

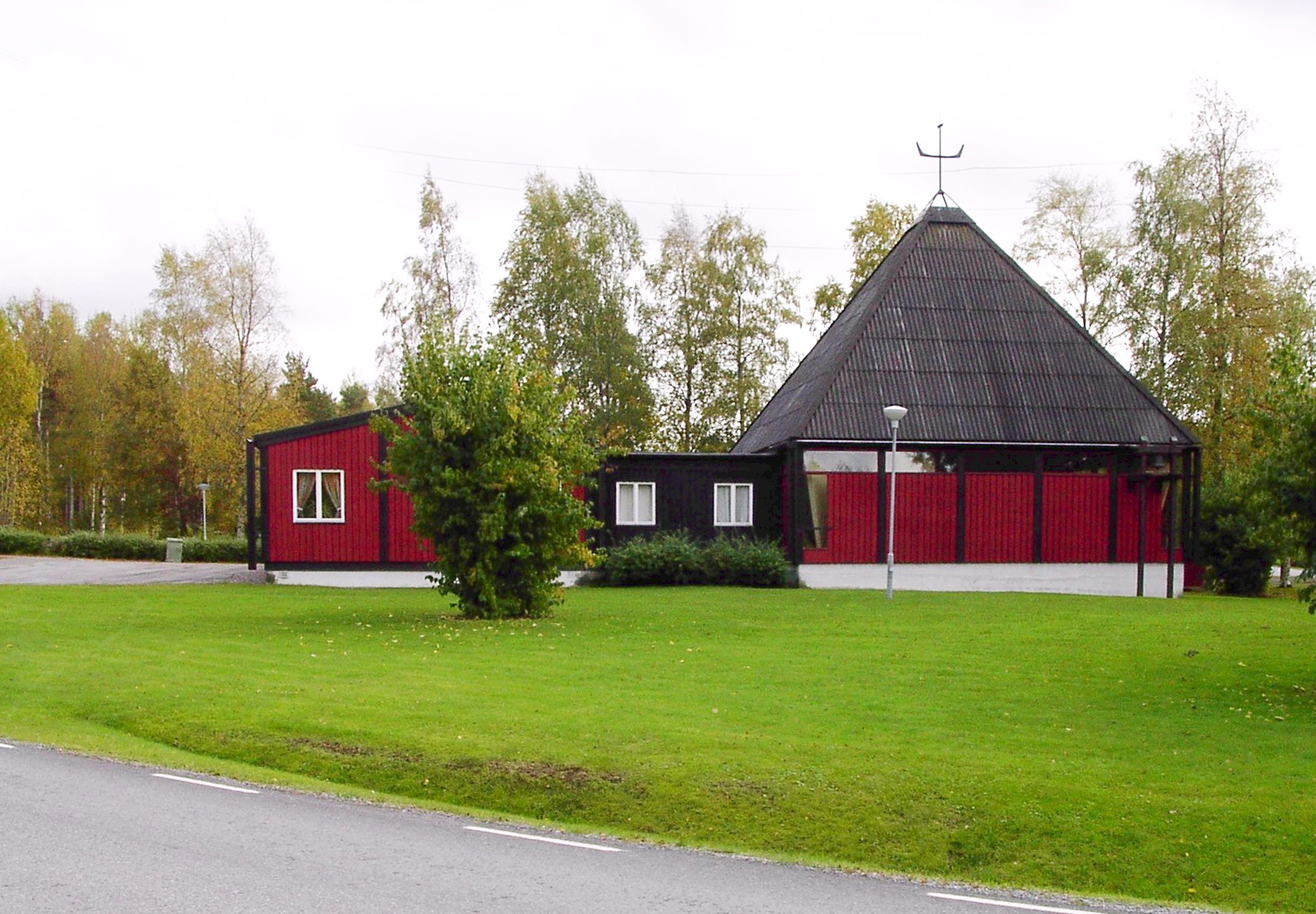
- Stråssa church

- Location within Örebro Location within Sweden
- Coordinates: 59°44′N 15°12′E
- Country: Sweden
- Province: Västmanland
- County: Örebro County
- Municipality: Lindesberg Municipality

Area
  - Total: 1.54 km^{2} (0.59 sq mi)

Population (1 januari 2026)
  - Total: 334
  - Density: 198/km^{2} (510/sq mi)
- Time zone: UTC+1 (CET)
  - Summer (DST): UTC+2 (CEST)

Stråssa is a locality situated in Lindesberg Municipality, Örebro County, Sweden with 306 inhabitants in 2010.

It is located in the northern part of the municipality, approximately 23 km north of Lindesberg, which is the seat and central town of the municipality.
