= Wartime cross-dressers =

Hannah Snell, who disguised herself as a man and joined the British Army in 1745

Many people have engaged in cross-dressing during wartime under various circumstances and for various motives. This has been especially true of women, whether while serving as a soldier in otherwise all-male armies, while protecting themselves or disguising their identity in dangerous circumstances, or for other purposes. Conversely, men would dress as women to avoid being drafted, the mythological precedent for this being Achilles hiding at the court of Lycomedes dressed as a woman to avoid participation in the Trojan War.

== Prehistory, legend and mythology ==
- Epipole of Carystus was a Greek woman described by Chennos as having joined the Greek army during the Trojan War.
- Hua Mulan was, according to a famous Chinese poem, a woman who joined the Chinese army in her father's stead.
- In the Albanian folk tale of Nora of Kelmendi, she is a 17th century woman warrior, sometimes referred to as the "Helen of Albania" as her beauty also sparked a great war. In some tales she is referred to as a burrnesha fighting an Ottoman attack on her village with a band of women in Malësia because she declined to join the attacker's harem and killing him in a duel.

== Historical ==
=== Middle Ages ===
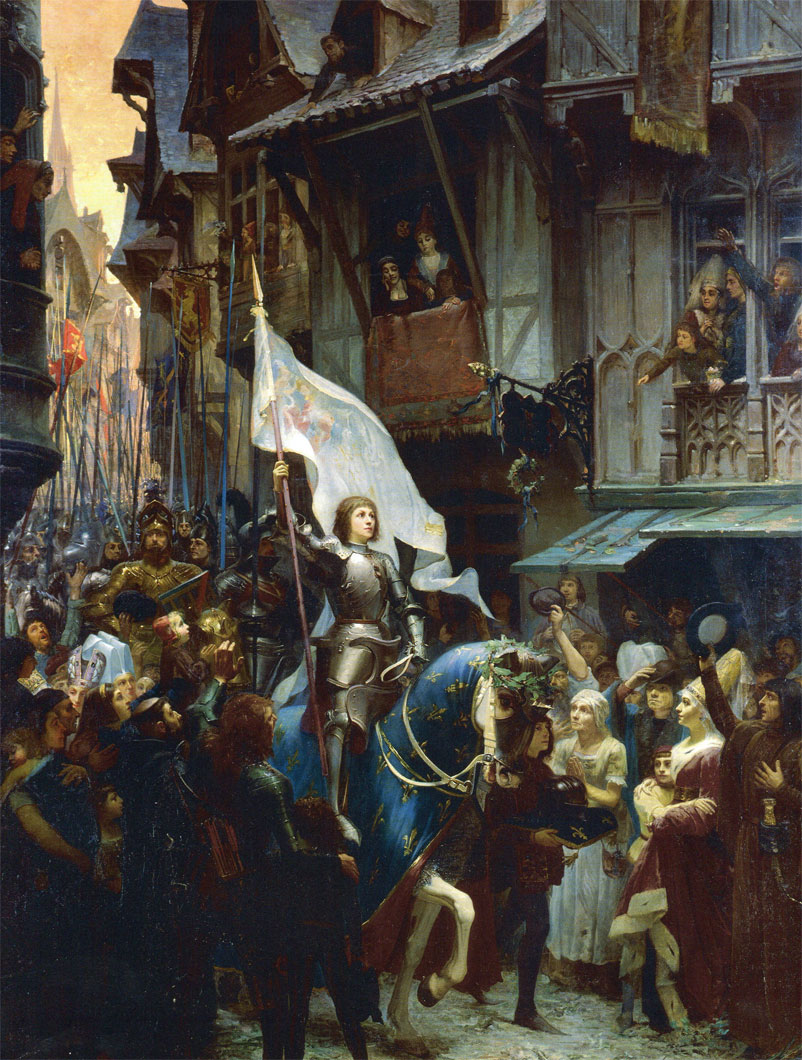
Joan of Arc enters Orléans (painting by J.J. Sherer, 1887)

- Fannu
- Mercadera
- Joanna of Flanders (c. 1295–1374) led the Montfortist faction in Brittany in the 1340s after the capture of her husband left her as the titular head of the family. She wore male dress at engagements such as the siege of Hennebont.
- Onorata Rodiani (1403–1452) was an Italian mercenary who served as a cavalry soldier, disguised in male clothing and with a male name, under a condottieri (freelance commander) named Oldrado Lampugnano beginning in 1423.
- Jacqueline of Wittelsbach, Countess of Hainaut, Holland and Zeeland (1401–1436) led the Hoek faction (the aristocratic faction) in Holland. Jacqueline and one of her servants disguised themselves as soldiers to escape confinement in Ghent.
- Jeanne des Armoises
- Joan of Arc (1412–1431) is a folk heroine of France and a Roman Catholic saint. A peasant girl born in what is now eastern France who claimed divine guidance, she led the French army to several important victories during the Hundred Years' War. She journeyed through hostile Burgundian territory disguised as a male soldier. After being captured by her enemies, she was burned at the stake for heresy when she was 19 years old.

=== Sixteenth century ===
- Brita Olofsdotter, widow of soldier Nils Simonsson, dressed as a man and enlisted in the Finnish unit in the Swedish cavalry in Livonia. She was killed in battle, and King John III of Sweden ordered her salary to be paid to her family.
- Catarina Lopes
- Anna Maria Christmann
- Christian Davies
- Suriyothai
- Maria Ursula d'Abreu e Lencastro
- Louise Labé
- Antónia Rodrigues
- Okaji no Kata
- Antonio de Erauso
- Maria la Bailadora
- Anne Chamberlyne

=== Seventeenth century ===
- Margaretha (died after 1611) was a soldier in the Dutch States Army. She fought in the Dutch Revolt against Spain, making her one of the first female soldiers in Dutch history.
- Catalina de Erauso (1592–1650), the Nun Lieutenant, was a semilegendary Spanish adventurer.
- Aal de Dragoner (died before 1710), served as a Dutch dragoon. After death her body was put on display in an anatomical theatre.
- Christian Davies (1667–1739), "Mother Ross", served in the 2nd Dragoons (Scots Greys).
- Eleonore Prochaska
- Barbara Adriaens
- Mary Read
- Geneviève Prémoy
- Ulrika Eleonora Stålhammar
- Margareta Elisabeth Roos
- Lisbetha Olsdotter
- Jane Ingleby
- Alena Arzamasskaia

=== Eighteenth century ===
- Louise Antonini (1771–1861) was a French woman who disguised herself as a male to join the French Navy during the revolutionary period and the Napoleonic Wars.
- Bonnie Prince Charlie (1720–1788) dressed as Flora MacDonald's maidservant, Betty Burke, to escape the Battle of Culloden for the island of Skye in 1746.
- The Chevalière d'Éon (1728–1810) fought with the French dragoons during the Seven Years' War dressed as a male before serving France as a spy in Russia dressed as a female. In 1777 d'Éon began dressing and identifying as a woman and lived as such until her death. When d’Éon died in London in 1810.
- Francina Broese Gunningh (1783–1824) was a Dutch soldier who served in the French, Prussian and Dutch armies.
- Phoebe Hessel (1713–1821) enlisted in the British Army's 5th Regiment of Foot. She fought in the Battle of Fontenoy and was wounded in action.
- Johanna Sophia Kettner (1724–1802) may have been the first female to attain the rank of corporal in the Austrian army.
- Anna Maria Lane (1755–1810) dressed as a man to join the Continental Army in 1776 and fight in the American Revolutionary War with her husband until 1781, later received a pension for her courage in the Battle of Germantown.
- Catharina Margaretha Linck
- Sally St. Clair
- Maria ter Meetelen
- Thao Thep Krasattri and Thao Si Sunthon
- Angélique Brûlon
- Enriqueta Favez
- Ann Mills
- Mary Anne Talbot
- Katharina Marschall
- Maria van Antwerpen
- Sirma Voyvoda
- Brita Hagberg
- Fernig sisters
- Carin du Rietz
- Renée Bordereau
- Deborah Sampson (1760–1827) of Massachusetts was the first known American woman who disguised herself as a man ("Robert Shurtliff") to enlist as an infantry soldier. She served in the Continental Army in the Revolutionary War.
- Franziska Scanagatta (1776–1865) was an Italian woman who attended Austrian military school and served in the French Revolution as a lieutenant.
- Ana María de Soto (1777–1833), first Spanish soldier in the Marine Infantry. She fought against the English in the Battle of Cape San Vicente and the blockade of Cádiz. King Carlos IV granted her the salary and rank of sergeant, in addition to being able to wear the colors of marine battalions and sergeant's insignia on her women's clothes.
- Marie Schellinck (1757–1840) was a Belgian woman who fought in the French Revolution, becoming a sub-lieutenant.
- Hannah Snell (1723–1792) was an Englishwoman who entered military service under the name "James Gray", initially for the purpose of searching for her missing husband. She served in General Guise's regiment in the army of the Duke of Northumberland, and then in the marines.
- Ulrika Eleonora Stålhammar (1688–1733) was a female Swedish soldier during the Great Northern War, later put on trial for having served in the military posing as a man.
- Joanna Żubr (1770–1852) was a Polish soldier of the Napoleonic Wars and the first woman to receive the Virtuti Militari, the highest Polish military order.

=== Nineteenth century ===
- Albert Cashier (1843–1915), born Jennie Irene Hodgers, was an Irish-born individual who served three years in the Union Army during the American Civil War as a male soldier, and lived the next fifty years as a man.
- Maria Quitéria (1792–1853) was a heroine in the independence of Brazil, when she fought against the Portuguese troops in Bahia. Later, she was awarded by the Emperor Dom Pedro I.
- Jane Dieulafoy (1851–1916) was a French woman who, when her husband enlisted during the Franco-Prussian War, dressed as a man and fought alongside them.
- Nadezhda Durova (1783–1866) was a decorated Russian cavalry soldier of the Napoleonic Wars who spent nine years disguised as a man.
- Eleonore Prochaska (1785–1813) was a German woman soldier who fought in the Lützow Free Corps during the War of the Sixth Coalition.
- Friederike Krüger (1789–1848) was a soldier in the Prussian army.
- James Barry (c. 1792–1795 – 1865) was a military surgeon in the British Army who was born female and named Margaret Ann Bulkley.
- Anna Lühring (1796–1866) (sometimes wrongly referred to as Anna Lührmann) was a German soldier in the Lützow Free Corps during the Napoleonic Wars.
- Emilia Plater (1806-1831) a Polish–Lithuanian noblewoman and revolutionary from the lands of the partitioned Polish–Lithuanian Commonwealth, she fought in the November Uprising of 1830–1831 against the Russian Empire.
- Nathaniel Lyon (1818–1861) General for the Union during the American Civil War, allegedly dressed as a woman to spy on an enemy encampment.
- Giuseppa Bolognara Calcagno (1826–1884) was a heroine in the liberation of Catania in support of Garibaldi's Expedition of the Thousand; she wore only men's clothing, lived like a man among the male soldiers, and was awarded the Silver Medal of Military Valor.
- Frances Clayton (c. 1830 – after 1863) was an American woman who disguised herself as a man to fight for the Union Army in the American Civil War.
- Mária Lebstück (1831–1892) was a Hussar officer during the Hungarian War of Independence of 1848 and 1849 under the name Károly Lebstück.
- Martina Pierra de Poo (1833–1900) dressed as a male soldier while fighting for Cuban independence during the Lopez Expedition.
- Sarah Rosetta Wakeman (1843–1864) served with the Union Army in the American Civil War under the Alias of Lyons Wakeman and Edwin R. Wakeman. Her letters remain one of the few surviving primary accounts of female soldiers in the American Civil War.
- Sarah Emma Edmonds (1841–1898) served with the Union Army in the American Civil War disguised as a man named Frank Thompson.
- Mollie Bean served with the Confederate Army in the American Civil War under the alias Melvin Bean.
- Mary and Molly Bell, cousins who both served with the Confederate Army in the American Civil War.
- Cathay Williams (1844–1892) was a former slave who became the first recorded African-American woman in the U.S. Army.
- Loreta Janeta Velazquez a.k.a. "Lieutenant Harry Buford" (1842 – c. 1897) – A Cuban woman who donned Confederate garb and served as a Confederate officer and spy during the war.
- Rani of Jhansi (1828–1858) fought in the Indian Rebellion of 1857 by dressing as a sowar on behalf of her adopted son. Her identity was revealed when she was slain in battle.
- Tringë Smajli (1880–1917), known simply as Tringe Smajli, and as Yanitza outside Albania, was an Albanian guerrilla fighter who fought against the Ottoman Empire in the Malësia region. She was the daughter of Smajl Martini, a Catholic clan leader of the Grudë tribe of Malësia as a burnesha, at the time of her brother's deaths, Tringe became a sworn virgin – she took a vow of chastity and wore male clothing in order to live as a man in the patriarchal northern Albanian society.

=== Twentieth century ===
- Nestor Makhno (1888–1934), founder of the Makhnovshchina, temporarily disguised as a woman during World War I.
- Viktoria Savs joined the Austrian army during World War I.
- Milunka Savić joined the Royal Serbian Army during World War I dressed as a man. Her true identity was only discovered after she was wounded.
- Flora Sandes joined the Serbian army during World War I.
- Wanda Gertz (1896–1958) joined the Polish Legion in World War I to fight on the Eastern Front while posing as "Kazimierz Zuchowicz". Later she joined the Women's Voluntary Legion, and during World War II she commanded an all-woman sabotage unit of the Home Army.
- Dorothy Lawrence (1896–1964) was a British reporter who served as a man in the army during World War I.
- Zoya Smirnow (1897/98 – after 1916) was a Russian schoolgirl who along with 11 other friends ran away from their Moscow school and disguised themselves as men and joined the Russian army where they fought in Galicia and the Carpathians during World War I. After a death and number of injuries in the group, Smirnow's sex was discovered. She recounted their story to the English press.
- Frieda Belinfante (1904–1995) was a prominent musician and World War II Dutch Resistance fighter who disguised herself as a man for 6 months to avoid capture by the Gestapo.
- Henk Jonker (1912–2002) was a member of the Dutch resistance who disguised himself as a woman.
- Sylvin Rubinstein (1914–2011) was a member of the Polish resistance who disguised himself as a woman to perform espionage missions and assassinations.
- Ehud Barak (b. 1942), the later prime minister of Israel, disguised himself as a woman to assassinate members of the Palestine Liberation Organization in Beirut during the 1973 Israeli raid in Lebanon.

== Fiction ==
Fictional works where wartime cross-dressing is a major plot point include:

- In The Lord of the Rings, the princess Éowyn of Rohan disguises herself as the horse-rider Dernhelm to fight at the climatic Battle of the Pelennor Fields. Her confrontation with the Witch-King of Angmar resolves a prophecy that Sauron's lieutenant would not be felled by "the hand of man".
- In All the Queen's Men, a 2001 comedy set during WWII, cross-dressing is a central plot device.
- Terry Pratchett's novel Monstrous Regiment is a satirical look at the phenomenon.
- I Was a Male War Bride is a comedy where the male French officer, played by Cary Grant, must dress like a woman to return as a war bride of his American military wife.
- One of the running gags of the TV series M*A*S*H is Klinger's attempts to get discharged from military service by crossdressing.
- In Tamora Pierce's The Song of the Lioness quartet of books, Alanna of Trebond disguises herself as a boy to train to become a royal knight, a position only given to noble-born boys.
- Genesis Climber Mospeada was perhaps the first anime series to feature a regular crossdresser, Yellow Belmont, amongst the main protagonists.
- H. E. Bates's novel The Triple Echo is about a World War II army deserter who cross-dresses to avoid arrest. This was made into a film in 1972.
- Mary "Jacky" Faber, the heroine of the Bloody Jack series of novels, disguises herself as a man to fight in the Napoleonic Wars.
- The Shadow Campaigns novel series by Django Wexler has a female main character rise through the ranks of an army while disguised as a man.
- Cross-dressing is frequently used as a source of comedy in the British television programme It Ain't Half Hot Mum, set in India and Burma in WWII.
