= Viktoria Savs =

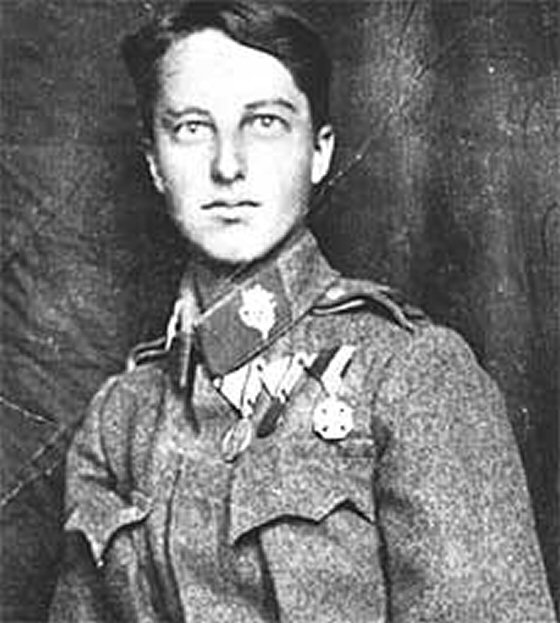
- Savs in 1917
- Born: 27 June 1899; Bad Reichenhall, Germany
- Died: 31 December 1979 (aged 80); Salzburg, Austria
- Occupation: Soldier
- Known for: Serving in the Austro-Hungarian military disguised as a man
- Parent: Peter Savs

Viktoria Savs (27 June 1899 in Bad Reichenhall - 31 December 1979 in Salzburg) served in the Austro-Hungarian Army during the First World War disguised as a man. She was one of two known female soldiers on the Austrian front lines (the other was Stephanie Hollenstein). She served with the knowledge of her superiors, but virtually unrecognized as a woman, on the Dolomite front from 1915 to 1917. After a severe injury in May 1917, she was hospitalized, and her biological sex was discovered, ending her military career. She was awarded several medals for her dedication and bravery. She was known as the "Heroine of the Drei Zinnen."

== Early life ==
Viktoria was born on 27 June 1899 in Bad Reichenhall, Upper Bavaria, Germany. Her mother died in 1904, and Viktoria was raised by her father, Peter Savs, with her three younger sisters, in Arco, Trentino, near Lake Garda. Shortly before the outbreak of the First World War, her father, a master shoemaker, moved the family to Obermais (Merano).

== Enlistment ==
Her father was called into military service as a Kaiserjäger in 1914, and was wounded in 1915 in Galicia on the Russian front. While he was at home recovering from his wounds, the sixteen-year-old Viktoria begged him to allow her to enlist. After unsuccessfully attempting to dissuade her, Peter decided to volunteer for the Austro-Hungarian Landsturm, a militia composed of troops who were too young or too old for standard military service. On 10 June 1915 she enlisted with her father as "Viktor," concealing her biological gender from all except a few superior officers. The two of them were assigned to a Standschützen battalion at Lavarone.

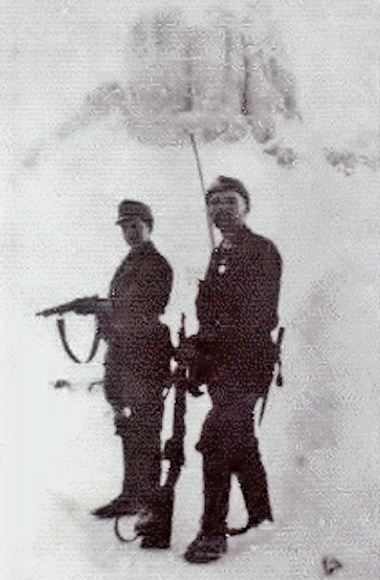
Viktoria Savs on the Dolomite Front with her father, probably about 1916. In the background can be seen the Drei Zinnen.

She served for more than a year as an unarmed trainee. Anxious to serve in combat, Viktoria wrote to the Archduke Eugen of Austria to request a transfer to the Italian front, which was granted in December 1916.

== Combat service ==
On the front lines, she showed talent in guiding pack animals and as a messenger on skis. She was assigned as an orderly to a captain and soon after took part in combat operations at Drei Zinnen. In an attack against Italian positions in the Sexten Dolomites (Sasso di Sesto) on 11 April 1917 she led a group of 20 captured Italians behind the Austrian lines under enemy artillery fire. For bravery and exemplary leadership, she was awarded the Medal for Bravery in bronze and later in silver, and the Karl Troop Cross.

"Viktor" was well known for volunteering for dangerous assignments. On 27 May 1917 she volunteered to carry a message up a sheer rock face, but was injured when an exploding grenade dislodged a boulder which crushed her right leg, leaving her foot dangling by only a few tendons. She was attempting to amputate her own limb with a knife when she lost consciousness and was rescued by comrades. She was transported to the field hospital at Sillian, where her leg had to be amputated below the knee. During preparation for surgery, her biological sex was uncovered, and upon awakening she was informed that her military career was over. She then served in the Austrian Red Cross during the rest of the war, where she was decorated with the Military Merit Cross (Austria-Hungary) for her service. She attracted attention and was hailed as a patriotic war heroine.

== Post-war activities ==
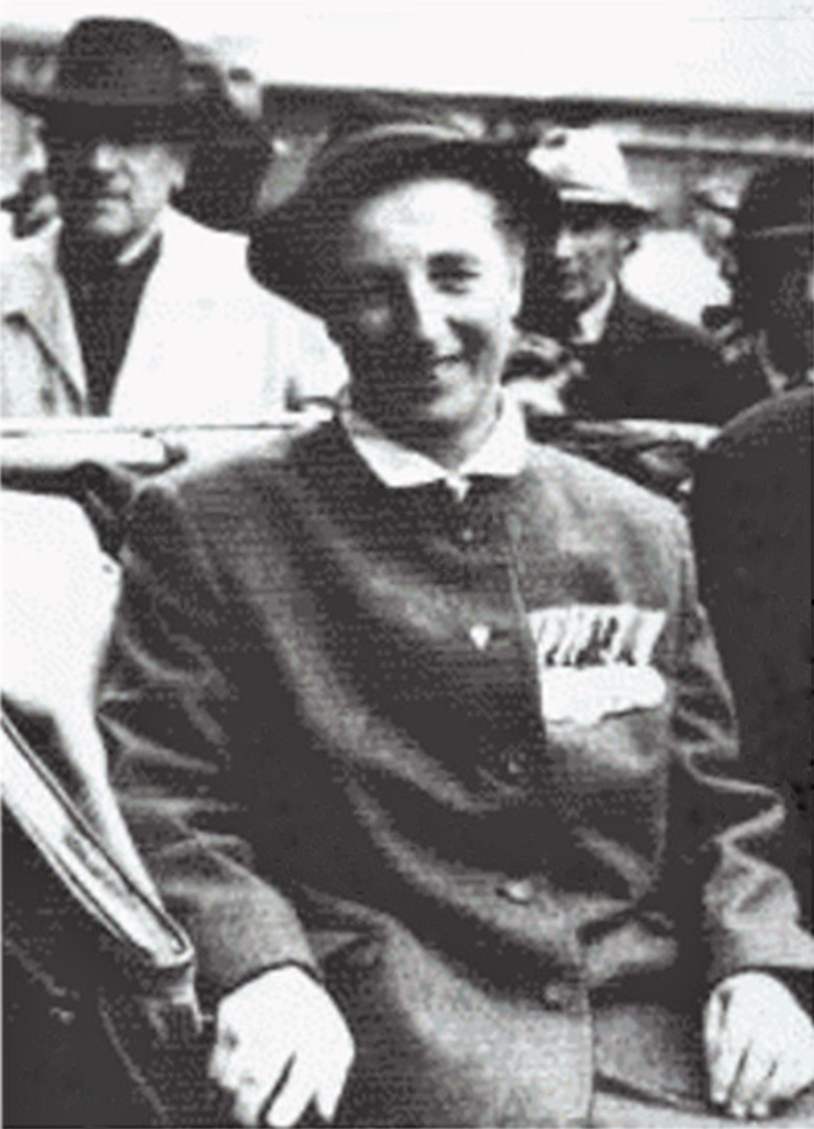
Viktoria Savs in Salzburg, about 1933.

After the war she was reluctant to return to her family home in Merano, which had been ceded to Italy along with the South Tyrol through the Treaty of Saint-Germain-en-Laye (1919). She moved to Hall in Tirol and then in 1928 to Salzburg, where she was homeless for a time. An anecdote, possibly apocryphal, relates that at one point when she was reduced to begging, she was recognized on the street by the Archduke Eugen, who offered to help her by employing her as a housekeeper. She took part in occasional veterans' meetings throughout the 1930s, and joined the NSDAP in 1933 (when it was still illegal in Austria), primarily to get a better disability pension.

In 1936 she moved to Berlin, where she received a gift of 150 Reichsmarks from Chancellor Adolf Hitler for the purchase of a new prosthetic leg. Following the annexation of Austria by Germany in 1938, she returned to Salzburg, where she took a job at the news department of the Wehrmacht. In 1942 she took a job at a microbiological research laboratory in Belgrade.

Savs never married, but late in life she adopted as her daughter a woman who was twenty years younger. In his 2015 biography, Frank Gerbert says that adoption of a partner was a common means of legitimizing same-sex relationships. The two women lived together until Savs' death in Salzburg in 1979.

== See also ==
- Johanna Sophia Kettner
- Franziska Scanagatta
- Stephanie Hollenstein
- Women in World War I
- List of wartime cross-dressers
