= Předměřice =

Předměřice is name of several places in the Czech Republic:

- Předměřice nad Jizerou, a municipality and village in the Central Bohemian Region
- Předměřice nad Labem, a municipality and village in the Hradec Králové Region
