= Chevalier de Mailly =

French courtesy title

The courtesy title chevalier de Mailly is accorded in France to a younger brother of the marquis or the comte de Mailly in each generation. Though several have carried the designation, the celebrated Louis (or Jean), chevalier de Mailly (-?1724)— possibly a brother of Louis II de Mailly (1662-1699), comte de Mailly, Lords of Rubempré, seigneur de Rieux, seigneur d'Haucourt— was the author of literary fairy tales, imaginary adventures, racy novels and romances, often published anonymously by necessity, sometimes published outside France. Departing from the formulas established by Mme d'Aulnoy, he introduced magic and marvels in his fairy tales to entertain his readers and bring his gallant lovers together. His fairy tales have often been reprinted and collected.

== Life and works ==
He appears to have become embroiled in a gay scandal in 1682, in which an aristocratic underground circle practicing le vice italien was uncovered. The supposed Confrérie italienne was even ascribed a constitution with a set of rules.

The chevalier de Mailly contributed a poem to the Mercure Galant December 1700, on the occasion of the departure for Spain of the duc d'Anjou as Felipe V. He declaimed his verses in the Café Procope, with the other wits of Paris.

Still, as a result of his scurrilous and anonymous secondary literary career, he could not fail to come to the attention of the lieutenant of police, Marc-Renée de Voyer d'Argenson, whose notes asserted that, far from being a godson of Louis XIV who had been wounded more than once in the armies of the King, he was actually the bastard of a maid in the hôtel de Mailly, brought up, out of charity by the marquise de Mailly. The wife of a bookseller, Auroy, who had advanced him 50 écus testified against him in 1702; it appeared to her that the manuscript, La Fille capitaine, instead of working up the personal memoirs of a well-known Parisian woman—originally thought to be the adventuress and singer Julie d'Aubigny, but later shown to have been Geneviève Prémoy, aka chevalier Baltazar—which Mme Auroy had entrusted to him; produced a result instead that proved to be too scandalous to publish: it featured bedroom scenes and an escaping nun setting fire to her convent. It appears that Mailly was required to quit Paris. A follow-up report of 15 September 1711 noted that he had returned to Paris and, being apprehended, spent a month in the Châtelet, following which he retired quietly to Rouen, where he seems to have remained, for his last work was printed there.

In the deductive reasoning shown by his princes of Serendip, taken up by Voltaire in Zadig, the chevalier de Mailly is sometimes credited as the originator of the clue-driven detective novel. The tale was retold in English by Horace Walpole, and the idea of serendipity passed into the English language.

Scholar Jack Zipes argues that de Mailly "display[ed] a wide knowledge of the literary sources" of 17th century French contes de fées, since at least three of his tales (namely, Blanche-Belle, Guérini and Fortunio) are reworkings of some of Straparola's tales. He also suggests that de Mailly had some knowledge of folkloric sources, as demonstrated by the aforementioned tales and the story Le Bienfaisant ou Quiribirini ("The Benefactor or Quiribirini").

== Some works ==
All of the following, partly as listed at www.worldcatlibraries.org, were published at Paris except as noted. The chevallier de Mailly's works were quickly reprinted at Amsterdam, for the most part.

- Les disgraces des amans, nouvelle historique (1690)
- La Rome galante, ou Histoire secrète sous les règnes de Jules César et d'Auguste (1695/96) The author's name is given as L.C.D.M..
- Histoire de la republique de Genes: depuis l'an 464 de la fondation de Rome jusqu'a present (1696). It was praised in the Journal des Savants ix (1697) and reprinted in 1742, according to Louis-Georges de Bréquigny, who panned the production in his preface to his maiden production, Histoire des révolutions de Gênes: depuis son établissement jusqu' à la conclusion de la Paix de 1748, 1753.
- Les Illustres Fées, contes galans dédiés aux dames (anonymously, 1698). These eleven fairy tales were often attributed to Madame d'Aulnoy. (on-line text)
  - Blanche-Belle, a literary variant of tale type ATU 706, "The Maiden Without Hands", akin to Biancabella and the Snake.
  - Fortunio, literary variant of ATU 316, The Nixie of the Mill-Pond
  - Le Prince Guérini, a literary variant of type ATU 502, "The Wild Man as Helper", akin to Guerrino and the Savage Man
  - Incarnat, blanc et noir, a literary variant of tale type ATU 408, "The Love for Three Oranges"
  - La Reine de l'isle des fleurs (The Story of the Queen of the Flowery Isles), often misattributed to Madame d'Aulnoy
  - Le Roi Magicien (The Wizard King)
  - Le Prince Roger
  - Le Bienfaisant ou Quiribirini ("The Benefactor or Quiribirini")
- Avantures et lettres galantes, avec La Promenade des Tuileries (1697) and its sequel L’Heureux Naufrage
- Le Triomphe de la Bazoche; et Les amours de Maistre Sebastien Grapignan 1698. The author's name is given as L.C.D.M..
- Les Amours du comte de Clare (anonymously, Amsterdam 1700)
- Les Eaux d'Aix : nouvelle divertissante du mois de may 1701 (1701)
- Nouveau cabinet des fées
- Anecdote, ou histoire secrète des Vestales (1701)
- Entretien des caffées de Paris (1702)
- Diverses avantures de France et d'Espagne, nouvelles galantes & historiques ("1707", actually 1706)
- Nouvelles toutes nouvelles (1709)
- Histoire du Prince Erastus, fils de l'empereur Diocletien. (1709)
- Le Voyage et les avanturesdes trois princes de Sarendip (1719), a reworking of Cristoforo Armeno, Peregrinaggio di tre giovanni figlioli del Rè di Serendippo... dalla Persiana nell'Italiana trappartato (1557). An English translation appeared in London in 1722. Horace Walpole's retelling introduced serendipity to the English language.
- L'éloge de la chasse, avec plusieurs avantures surprenantes & agréables qui y sont arrivées (1723)
- Lettre au roy sur sa majorité (1723)
- Principales merveilles de la nature : où l'on traite de la substance de la terre, de la mer, des fleuves, lacs, rivieres, montagnes, rochers, &c. avec un précis des choses les plus surprenantes qui s'y voyent, comme animaux, poissons, arbres, plantes, fruits, diamants, &c.; ouvrage rempli d'histoires, avantures & evénements extraordinaires arrivez dans l'Europe, l'Asie, l'Afrique & l'Amérique. Tiré des meilleurs auteurs anciens & modernes, enrichi de figures en taille-douce. (Rouen, 1723). This was his last work to appear.
