= Van Antwerpen =

Van Antwerpen is a surname. Notable people with the surname include:

- Franklin Van Antwerpen (1941–2016), American judge
- Maria van Antwerpen (1719–1781), Dutch soldier and cross dresser
- Patrick Van Antwerpen (1944–1990), Belgian film director

== See also ==
- Gazet van Antwerpen, Belgian newspaper
