= Marrying the Dark Knight (For Her Money) =

Japanese manga series

- First tankōbon cover

崖っぷち令嬢は黒騎士様を惚れさせたい！ (Gakeppuchi Reijō wa Kurokishi-sama o Horesasetai!)
- Genre: Fantasy; romantic comedy; yuri
- Manga

Marrying the Dark Knight (For Her Money)
- Written by: Suoh
- Illustrated by: Sometime
- Published by: Ichijinsha
- English publisher: Kodansha
- Magazine: Comic Yuri Hime
- Original run: 2024 – 2025
- Volumes: 3

Marrying the Dark Knight (For Her Money) (Japanese: 崖っぷち令嬢は黒騎士様を惚れさせたい！, Hepburn: Gakeppuchi Reijō wa Kurokishi-sama o Horesasetai!; "The Lady on the Brink Wants to Make the Black Knight Fall for Her!") is a fantasy yuri manga written by Suoh and illustrated by Sometime. It was serialized in Ichijinsha's Comic Yuri Hime from 2024 to 2025.

== Plot ==
Clarice von Ducale is the first-born daughter of a noble family in financial debt, and she wants to marry Frost von Galleria, reputed as the most fearsome and powerful knight of the kingdom and nicknamed the Dark Knight. Clarice later learns on the wedding night that Frost is a woman. Clarice needs to build her romance with Frost and, as women cannot serve as knights in the kingdom, must keep Frost's gender secret.

== Publication ==
Marrying the Dark Knight (For Her Money) was written by Suoh and illustrated by Sometime. It marks Suoh's debut as a manga writer; he explained that they had always wanted to make a work intersecting the yuri genre with political marriage. The manga's illustrator, Sometime, had previously worked on another yuri manga, Superwomen in Love! Honey Trap and Rapid Rabbit.

Marrying the Dark Knight (For Her Money) was serialized in Ichijinsha's Comic Yuri Hime starting in the April 2024 issue. The final chapter was published in the November 2025 issue. Ichijinsha released the manga's first tankōbon volume under its Comic Yuri Hime imprint in August 2024, with illustration merchandise released as bonus content from participating stores. Ichijinsha later released the other two in 2025. Kodansha later licensed the manga in English, with the first volume released in March 2026.

=== Volumes ===
No.	Original release date	Original ISBN	English release date	English ISBN
1	17 August 2024	9784758027526	10 March 2026	9798888777596
2	17 April 2025	9784758028820	4 August 2026	9798888779231
3	18 November 2025	9784758029926	3 November 2026	9798888779248

== Reception ==
In a review for Anime News Network's Spring 2026 Manga Guide, Erica Friedman, Rebecca Silverman, and Lucas DeRuyter starred the manga five, four-and-a-half, and three-and-a-half (respectively) out of five. Darkstorm of Anime UK News gave it a 8/10 rating. Writing for Okazu, Erica Friedman gave the manga an overall 8. Kara Dennison gave a positive review of the manga: "If you like dark fantasy, this will be a great palate-cleanser between adventures; if you like romance, this will give you a bit more than the usual fluff to enjoy."

Silverman called the manga her "new favorite as it deftly merges genres to create a story that's hard to resist," and Dennison remarked that it "combines gory dark fantasy with surprisingly adorable romantic comedy". Darkstorm criticized the fantasy setting as "rather run-of-the-mill", noting that it is poorly explored beyond the fantasy beasts and patriarchal aspects. Darkstorm praised the unique designs of the characters, particularly Frost, as well as the designs of the fantastical creatures featured in the work, and Dennison said that the art "suits both sides of the narrative. Combat is grim, gritty, and elaborate; at-home scenes are extremely cute."

Darkstorm described Matt Treyvaud's translation as "an easy read" but criticized the lack of translation notes, and Friedman praised Suoh's writing as "solid throughout". Friedman's Okazu review remarked on the importance of the word "edge" in the manga; she cites for example the first word of the Japanese title being gakepucchi/"edge of a cliff", which relates to Clarice's initial story, and she notes that Frost's noble title is marquis, which means "ruler of the March…the very edge of the land".

=== Characters ===
Citing her character arc, Darkstorm called Clarice a "fun protagonist" and Friedman (writing for ANN) called her "one of [her] favorite protagonists of the last few years". Dennison said that Clarice "is actually an extremely likable character with a big heart" despite being motivated by money. DeRuyter found the supporting characters "cute and quirky" but criticized the first volume for providing them with limited screentime.

Darkstorm praised Clarice and Frost's relationship, noting it is an unusual version of an "enemies to lovers" scenario. DeRuyter compared the relationship to "adding a yuri twist to the Beauty and the Beast formula of a very likable woman finding herself suddenly betrothed to an intimidating partner", and Dennison said of the relationship: "I don't always have my finger on the pulse of BookTok, but I have it on good authority that 'enemies to lovers' is pretty hot right now." However, DeRuyter criticized the first volume's lack of major unique non-yuri aspects and of the focus on the question surrounding the relationship's lesbian nature, and Friedman's Okazu review criticized the limited presence of yuri in the first volume. Regarding the first volume's cover, Darkstorm said that the relationship dynamic is reflected within the difference in height and breast size. Darkstorm also praised the comedic tone for relating between the duo.
