= Jan Štursa =

Czech sculptor (1880–1925)

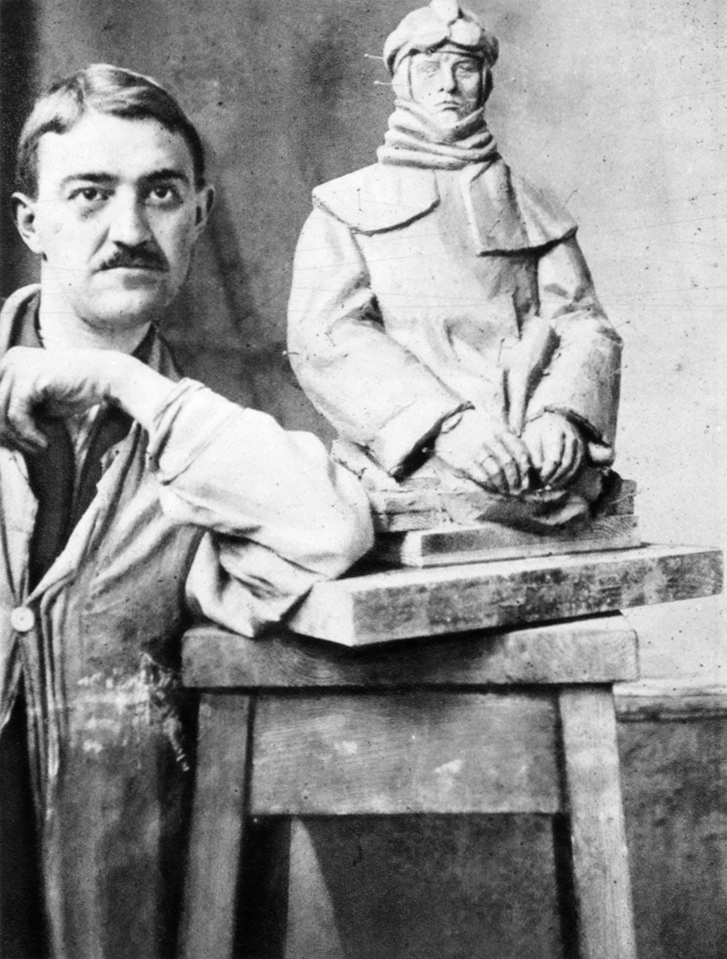
Jan Štursa in 1915

Jan Josef Štursa (15 May 1880 – 2 May 1925) was a Czech sculptor, one of founders of modern Czech sculpture.

== Birth and studies ==
Štursa was born on 15 May 1880 in Nové Město na Moravě. He studied masonry and sculpture in Hořice and worked as stone cutter. Later, he studied at the Academy of Arts (AVU) in Prague under professor Josef Myslbek, a known sculptor. As a result of very rigorous criticism from Myslbek, Štursa destroyed most of his early works.

== Themes and materials ==
Štursa was not influenced by Czech National Revival as the older sculptors but tried to find his own way. The female body was his frequent motif, for example in Before taking bath, 1906 or The Melancholy Girl, 1906. A monumental couple of figures decorates the pylons of Hlávka Bridge in Prague. In addition to stone and bronze he also used plaster and wax. Later, he was influenced by Cubism. Portrait painting was an important part of his works.

== World War I ==
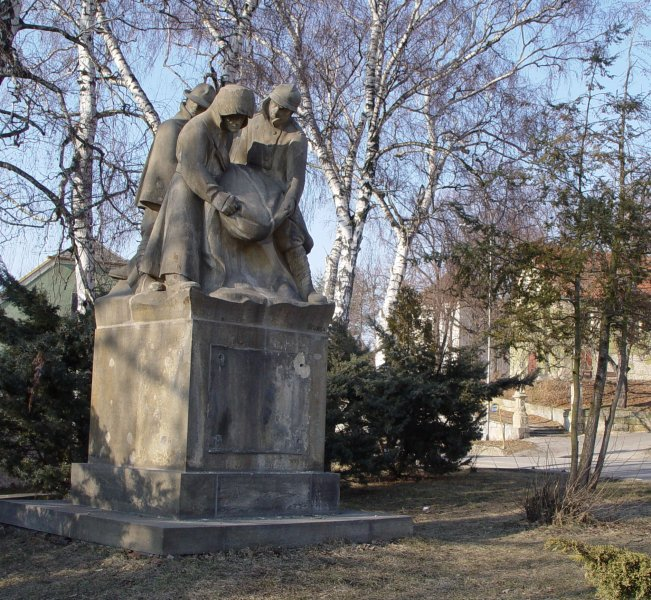
Burial in the Carpathians, a World War I monument in Předměřice nad Jizerou

The tragedy of World War I (he had served at the front) affected Štursa's work. The most famous work of this period is The Wounded: early version, final version (1921), more details.

The inspiration for the Burial in the Carpathians sculpture was a photograph from a Carpathian battlefield. The original group in Austrian uniforms was remade in the 1920s into a memorial of victims of World War I and placed in the village Předměřice nad Jizerou, with copies in Místek and in Nové Město na Moravě.

In 1922–1924, Štursa served as Rector of the Academy of Arts (AVU). Štursa suffered from the effects of syphilis and on 2 May 1925, faced with increasing pain, he killed himself in his atelier in Prague at age 44.

Štursa's nephew Jiří Štursa was the architect of Stalin's Monument (Prague).

== Works ==
- Art Nouveau funerary monument for artist Max Horb in the New Jewish Cemetery.
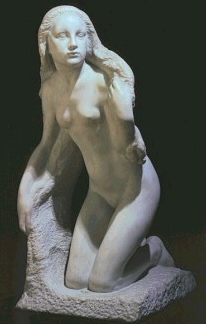
Before the bath (1906), National Gallery in Prague

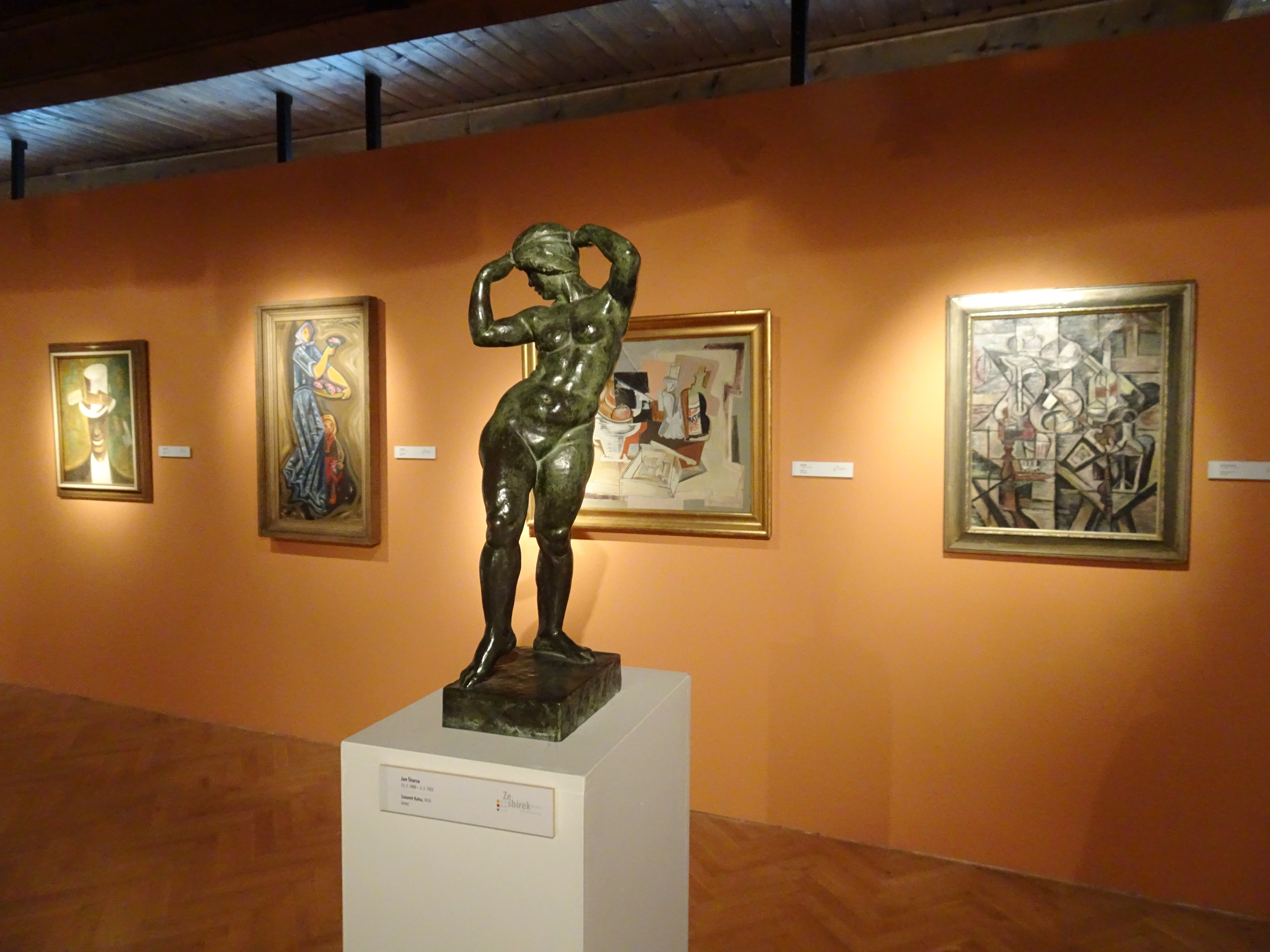
"Sulamit Rahu" (1911) - Prague National Gallery

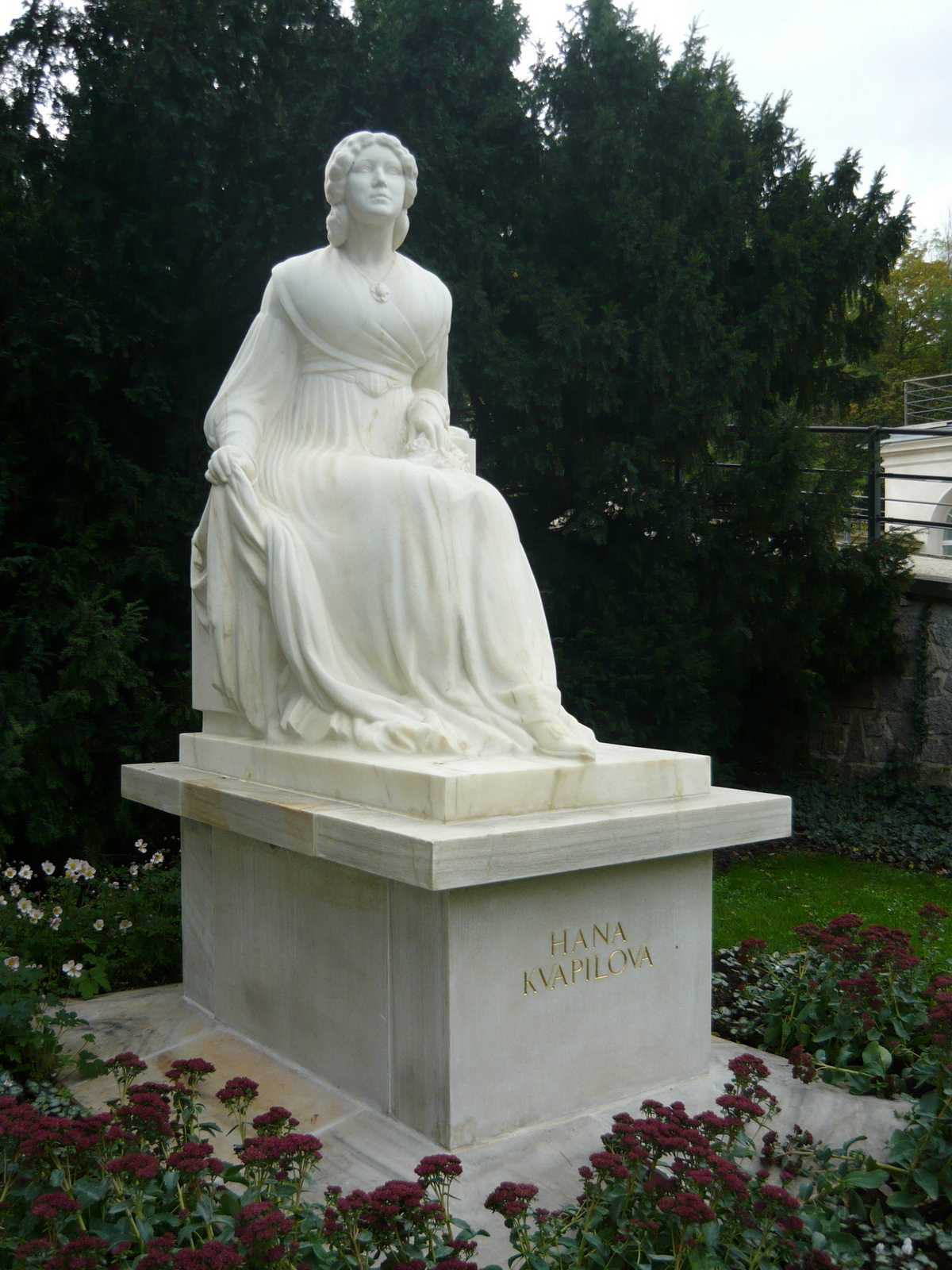
Monument of Czech stage actress Hana Kvapilová, (1914) Kinského zahrada, Prague

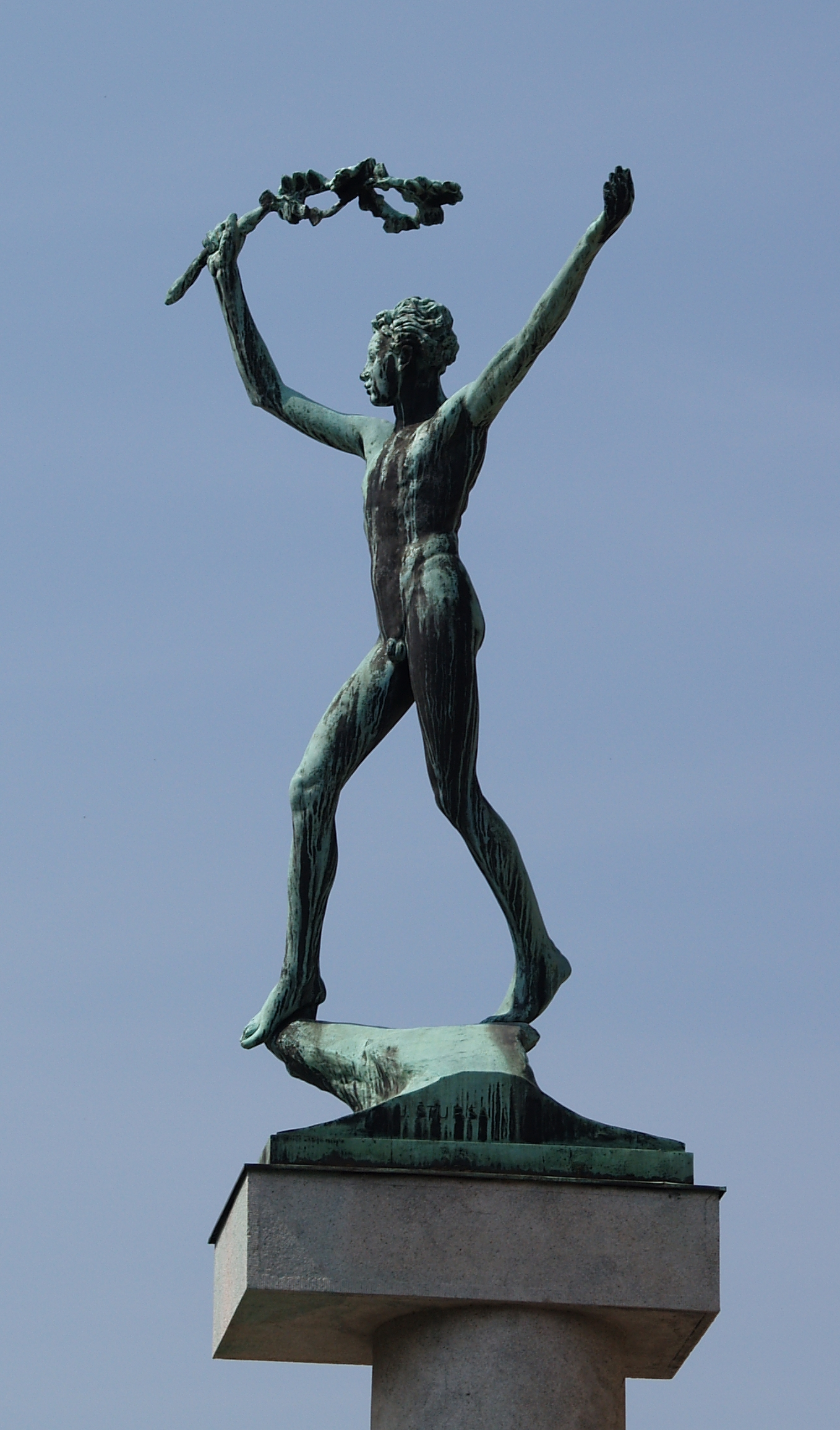
Victor, Hradec Králové

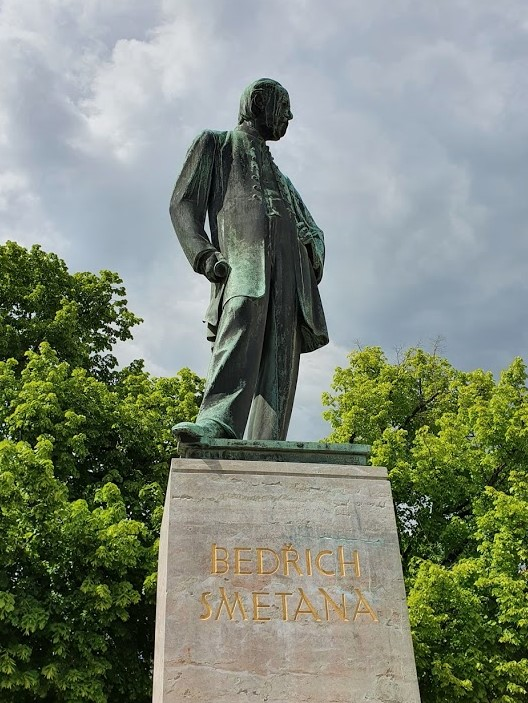
Monument of Bedřich Smetana, Litomyšl
