= Onorata Rodiani =

Italian painter and condottiere (1403–1452)

- Born: 1403; Castelleone
- Died: 1452 (aged 48–49); Castelleone
- Known for: Semi-legendary painter and condottiere

Onorata Rodiani (or Honorata Rodiana) (1403–1452) was a "semi-legendary" Italian painter and condottiere. She was born at Castelleone near Cremona, and also later died there.

== Killing a Cremonese courtier ==
The anecdote for which she is best known was first described in 1590 by Conrado Flameno in his Storia di Castelleone (History of Castelleone). According to him, she was commissioned by Cabrino Fondolo, tyrant of the town of Cremona, to decorate his palace with paintings; it is the only record of a commission given to a woman in the Quattrocento. While she was painting a fresco, which was her speciality, a young courtier behaved indecently towards her. She killed him with a knife and fled "disguised as a man". Flameno quotes her as saying:

"It is better to live honoured outside my homeland than dishonoured within it".

== Life as a soldier ==
The 1590 Storia di Castelleone goes on to say that Onorata Rodiani, while tried and pardoned by Cabrino Fondolo, entered the service of Oldrado Lampugnano, a condottiere (mercenary commander), as a cavalryman in 1423. Flameno says that she did this "unknown to all", and then lived "with her name and her clothing changed", suggesting her as an example of crossdressing during wartime. She then served with several captains, including Conrado Sforza, brother of duke Francesco Sforza. While under his command, in 1452, she supposedly came to the aid of her hometown of Castelleone, besieged by the republic of Venice. The siege was raised but she was mortally wounded, carried into the town, and there, after being "recognized with great amazement", she died. Flameno concludes this episode with another quotation from Onorata:

"Honoured I lived, honoured I shall die".

== History ==
As stated before, the history of Onorata Rodiani is uncertain. Conrado Flameno, in both quotes he attributes to Onorata, puns on her name: Onorata means "honoured" in Italian, and Onorata, in both cases, speaks about "living honoured".

According to Flameno, she was buried in the parish church of Castelleone, but a new parish church was built in Castelleone in the 16th century, and no trace of her tomb was found. Her legend is nevertheless alive in Castelleone, and two unfinished wall paintings in the palazzo Galeotti-Vertua, thought to be the palace where Gabrino Fondolo resided, are sometimes attributed to her.

There are several versions regarding the works that Onorata was painting before having to flee. A 19th-century version of her life states that she was painting in tempera on dry plaster, which would explain that none of her works survived to be attributed to her beyond reasonable doubt. On the other hand, if she truly did paint affresco, it would mean a long training to master this difficult technique -- "a circumstance even more remarkable, in those days when women were comparatively often to be seen in command of troops, than her serving under the condotierri". The name of another woman, Caterina dei Vigri, who was eventually canonized, appears on a tempera painting from 1456, and it was reported by her biographer and friend that Caterina dei Vigri did indeed paint, notably miniatures. Paintings by Caterina have recently been discovered.

As to Onorata's service as a soldier, the dates given by Conrado Flameno are coherent with what is known of military events in 15th-century Italy. This could either mean there is some truth in Flameno's account, or that he took care to frame Onorata's myth into what he knew had happened more than a century before his own time.

== In popular culture ==
The figure of Onorata appears in the novel Ash: A Secret History by Mary Gentle, in which her episode with the Cremonese courtier is suggested to be propaganda, but she does command a mercenary company in the novel, and meets with her counterpart and main character, Ash.

== Notes and references ==
- Echols, Anne; Williams, Marty (1992). An annotated index of medieval women. Markus Wiener Publishing. ISBN 0-910129-27-4.
- Greer, Germaine (2001-06-02) [1979, 2001]. The obstacle race: the fortunes of women painters and their work. Tauris Parke Paperbacks. ISBN 1-860646-77-8.
