= The Wizard King =

French fairy tale

- Short story by Chevalier de Mailly
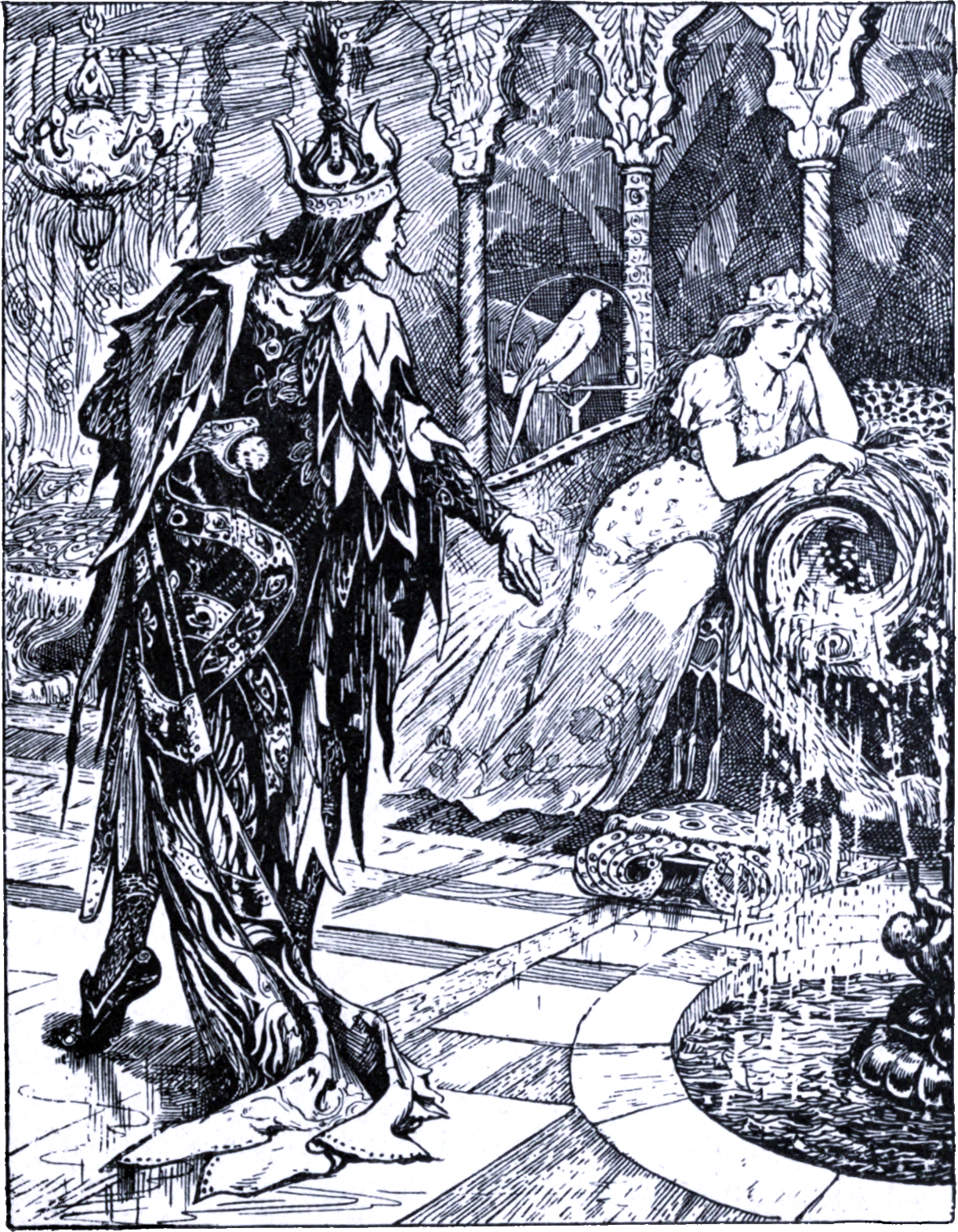
- The Wizard and the princess. Illustration from The Yellow Fairy Book (1894)
- Original title: 'Le Roi Magicien'
- Country: France (1698)
- Language: French (originally)
- Genre: Literary fairy tale

Publication
- Published in: Les Illustres Fées
- Publication type: Fairy tale collection
- Publication date: 1698

The Wizard King (Le Roi Magicien) is a French fairy tale published in Les fees illustres by the Chevalier de Mailly. Andrew Lang included it in The Yellow Fairy Book.

== Synopsis ==
A king was lord over many lands and had mastered magical secrets. He married a princess, and they had a son. The queen set out to seek her fairy godmother, as soon as the baby was strong enough, because she had been warned that her husband was a wizard, and wizards and fairies had long feuded. Her fairy godmother gave him the gift of pleasing everyone and of learning quickly. A few years later, the queen died, instructing her son to do nothing without consulting that fairy.

The king was grief-stricken. Finally, as his familiar settings continually reminded him of his queen, he set out to foreign lands, using his arts to shapeshift into animals and so move about freely. As an eagle, he saw a far country where the queen had a single daughter, astoundingly beautiful. He carried her off and pleaded with her to marry him. Although he installed her in a beautiful castle, with fine servants and a charming parrot for her pet, her capture had ensured that she would never be won over. He kept her from his court, but one day thought that she might have heard of the charms of his son. Fearing he was a rival, the king sent him on a journey.

The prince traveled until he came to the kingdom where the princess had been stolen from. He was deeply moved by the story and resolved to rescue her, and went to the fairy for aid. She declared that he could not reach the enchanted castle where the princess was, and the only expedient she could think of was to capture her parrot. When the prince did this, the fairy turned the prince into an identical parrot. In his new form, the prince reached the princess and, after seeing that she disliked his father the king, told her why he was there.

The fairy created a chariot, drawn by eagles, and had the captive parrot direct it to the castle. There, the prince and princess escaped on it. The king followed them to her mother's country, but when he tried to cast a magical potion on them, the fairy threw it back on him. This allowed them to capture him and so strip him of his powers. The prince asked for the king to be pardoned, and it was so. As the king took to the skies he vowed never to forgive his son or the fairy.

== Legacy ==
Researcher Carolyn Abbate suggests that the tale The Wizard King shares "several curious affinities, even specific narrative moments" with Mozart's opera The Magic Flute (1791).

Scholar Daphne Hoogenboezem points out that the tale was also published in Dutch with the name Koning Toveraar.

The name The Wizard King was also used as the title of a comic book trilogy by Wally Wood.
