= Aal de Dragonder =

Female soldier killed in Rotterdam

Aal de Dragonder (died before 1710) was a female soldier killed in Rotterdam whose skeleton was displayed in the Rotterdam anatomical theatre.

Sometime before 1710, and probably in Rotterdam, she was involved in a fight between soldiers and died. Only after her death was it discovered she was female. Her body was not buried, but donated to the Rotterdam medical school, founded in 1642, and her body was probably used for anatomical lessons. Eventually her skeleton and prepared skin were put on display in the anatomical theatre, her skeleton holding a sword while seated upon a horse skeleton.

In November 1710, a German visitor to the anatomical theater, Zacharias Conrad von Uffenbach, was told that the mounted person was a woman who had served for a long time as a dragoon and had been stabbed by her fellow soldiers. Uffenbach wrote that she wore a hat bearing the name "Aal de Dragonder". Her mounted skeleton remained on display for well over a century, as in 1817 a visiting physician reported that she at that time was wearing armor. The collection was probably broken up in 1828.

== See also ==
- List of wartime cross-dressers
