= Margaretha (soldier) =

17th century Dutch female soldier

Margaretha (born in Groningen, died after 1611) was a soldier in the Dutch States Army. She fought disguised as a man in the Dutch Revolt against Spain. This made her one of the first female soldiers in Dutch history.

== Biography ==
Margaretha is described by historian Emanuel van Meteren, who writes that she had served as a soldier, dressed as a man, for seven years. She fought first as a pikeman, later using a musket. Her fellow soldiers praised her heroism in taking many entrenchments near Steenwijk and Groningen. Van Meteren describes her as "a stout and dauntless warrior, yea among the officers [was] reckoned".

Margaretha married a drummer she met in the army. Together they went to live in Groningen sometime between 1599 and 1611, where they ran a shop in "fatty goods". Margaretha is said to have written a song where she called on other women to also defend the fatherland as soldiers, "exhorting the young daughters to the love of war to protect the fatherland by her example".
