= Předměřice nad Labem =

- Municipality
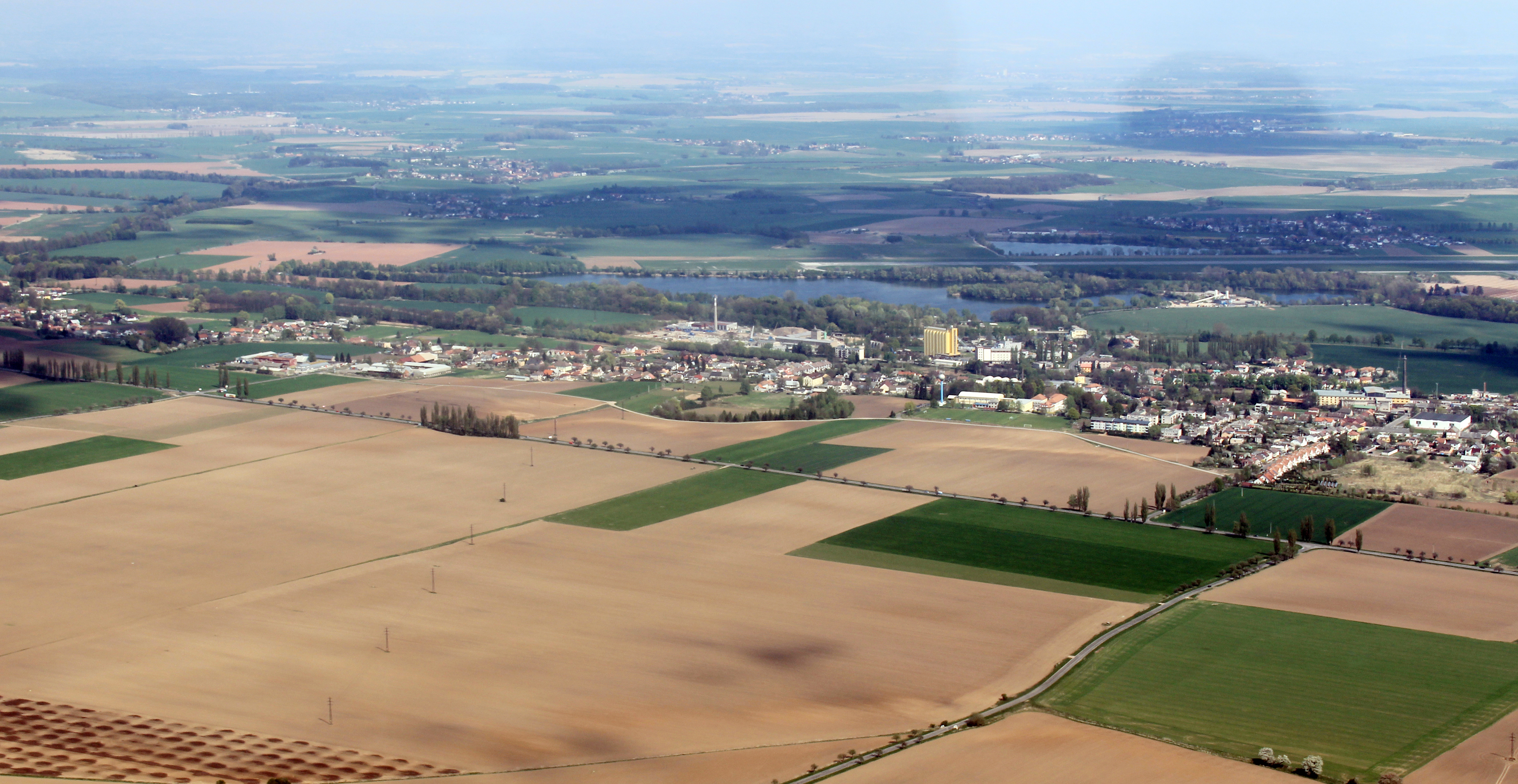
- Aerial view

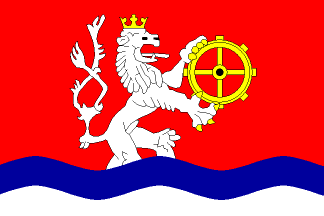
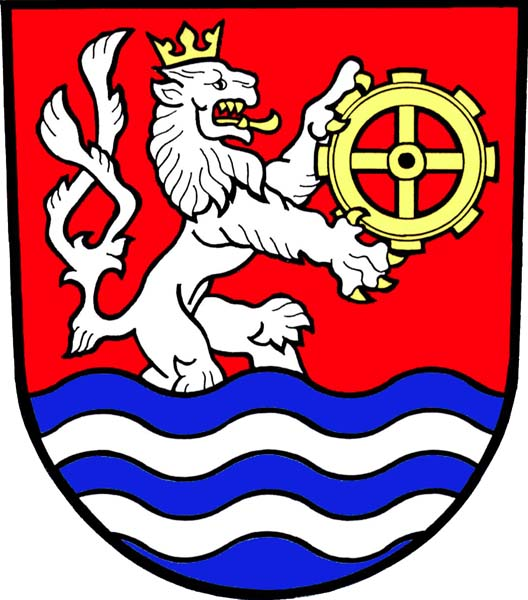
- Flag Coat of arms

- Location in the Czech Republic
- Coordinates: 50°15′27″N 15°48′47″E
- Country: Czech Republic
- Region: Hradec Králové
- District: Hradec Králové
- First mentioned: 1397

Area
  - Total: 5.48 km^{2} (2.12 sq mi)
- Elevation: 240 m (790 ft)

Population (2026-01-01)
  - Total: 1,968
  - Density: 359/km^{2} (930/sq mi)
- Time zone: UTC+1 (CET)
  - Summer (DST): UTC+2 (CEST)
- Postal code: 503 02
- Website: www.predmericenl.cz

Předměřice nad Labem is a municipality and village in Hradec Králové District in the Hradec Králové Region of the Czech Republic. It has about 2,000 inhabitants.

== Etymology ==
The name is derived from the personal name Předmír, meaning "the village of Předmír's people".

== Geography ==
Předměřice nad Labem is located about 5 kilometres (3 mi) north of Hradec Králové. It lies in a flat agricultural landscape in the East Elbe Table. The municipality is situated on the right bank of the Elbe River. A part of Správčický písník (a lake created by flooding a quarry) is located in the territory of Předměřice nad Labem.

== History ==
The first written mention of Předměřice nad Labem is from 1397.

== Demographics ==
Historical population

Year	Pop.	±%
1869	859	—
1880	934	+8.7%
1890	930	−0.4%
1900	1,104	+18.7%
1910	1,351	+22.4%

Year	Pop.	±%
1921	1,455	+7.7%
1930	1,636	+12.4%
1950	1,397	−14.6%
1961	1,404	+0.5%
1970	1,494	+6.4%

Year	Pop.	±%
1980	1,564	+4.7%
1991	1,504	−3.8%
2001	1,599	+6.3%
2011	1,869	+16.9%
2021	1,779	−4.8%

Source: Censuses

== Transport ==
The D11 motorway (the section from Hradec Králové to Jaroměř) runs through the municipality.

Předměřice nad Labem is located on the railway line heading from Pardubice and Hradec Králové to Jaroměř.

== Sights ==
The only protected cultural monument in the municipality is a late Gothic column shrine from the year 1562. It is unique due to its age and state of preservation, free from later alterations.

== Notable people ==
- Katharina Marschall (1740 – c. 1820), female soldier
- Jindřich Uher (1911–1985), politician
