= Maria la Bailadora =

Spanish soldier

Maria la Bailadora (d. after 1571), was a Spanish soldier. She famously participated in the Battle of Lepanto in 1571 dressed as a man. She is portrayed in the novel Clash of Empires: The Red Sea by William Napier.
