= Barbara Adriaens =

Dutch soldier

Willem Adriaens (born Barbara Adriaens) (1611 – fl. 1636) was a Dutch soldier who lived as a man, and whose prosecution for alleged transvestism and homosexuality is one of the best known and documented from the early modern age in the Netherlands.

Adriaens was baptized in 1611, in Bouwershaven; his father was Cornelis Adriaense. In 1624, in Delft, at the age of thirteen, Adriaens partook in 3 days of drinking, and was subsequently placed in a house of correction (a Spinhuis, where inmates were taught to spin). After release, Adriaens worked briefly as a domestic and a sewist. In 1627 or 1628, Adriaens adopted male clothing and began using the name Willem Adriaens. At age 18, he enlisted in the army, eventually being stationed in Amsterdam. In 1632, three years after enlisting, he married.

His wife, Hilletje Jans, worked as a peddler. The couple had been introduced by Hilletje's sister, who was also Willem's landlord. They were officially engaged a mere two weeks after meeting, and married on September 12, 1632. Jans would eventually claim not to have been aware of Adriaens' anatomy at the time of their marriage. After they were married, Adriaens apparently avoided consummating the marriage by claiming to be sick.

Eventually, Jans suspected her husband of hiding his anatomy, possibly being given information by a woman who had known Adriaens prior to his adoption of men's clothing. Though initially Jans maintained the secret, she proceeded to make an accusation in public after she and Willem quarreled outside a public house. This led to Adriaens being arrested and brought to trial.

In court, Adriaens described never having felt sexual attraction to males, with his landlady/sister-in-law testifying to his habit of going dancing in places known to be frequented by sex workers. Homosexuality was punishable by death, but this law was usually not applied in cases of supposedly female homosexuality, as intercourse was primarily defined by penetration. Another criterion was that the accused live together with one individual fulfilling the male role and another fulfilling the female role. The last criterion was met in Adriaen's case, and the prosecutor recommended the death penalty. However, the French Duchess de Bouillon, who was visiting the town at this point, took an interest in the case and prevented a death sentence. Instead, Adriaens was sentenced to be banished from the city for a period of 24 years.

Jans was given no punishment as she was deemed not to have known anything of the actual anatomy of her spouse.

After the trial and sentence, Adriaens moved north, again living as a man. In 1636, he was prosecuted in the city of Groningen, where he again had been living as a man, and had married a woman, Alke Peter. This time he was banished from the city of Groningen for life, and further biographical details are unknown.
