= Předměřice nad Jizerou =

- Municipality
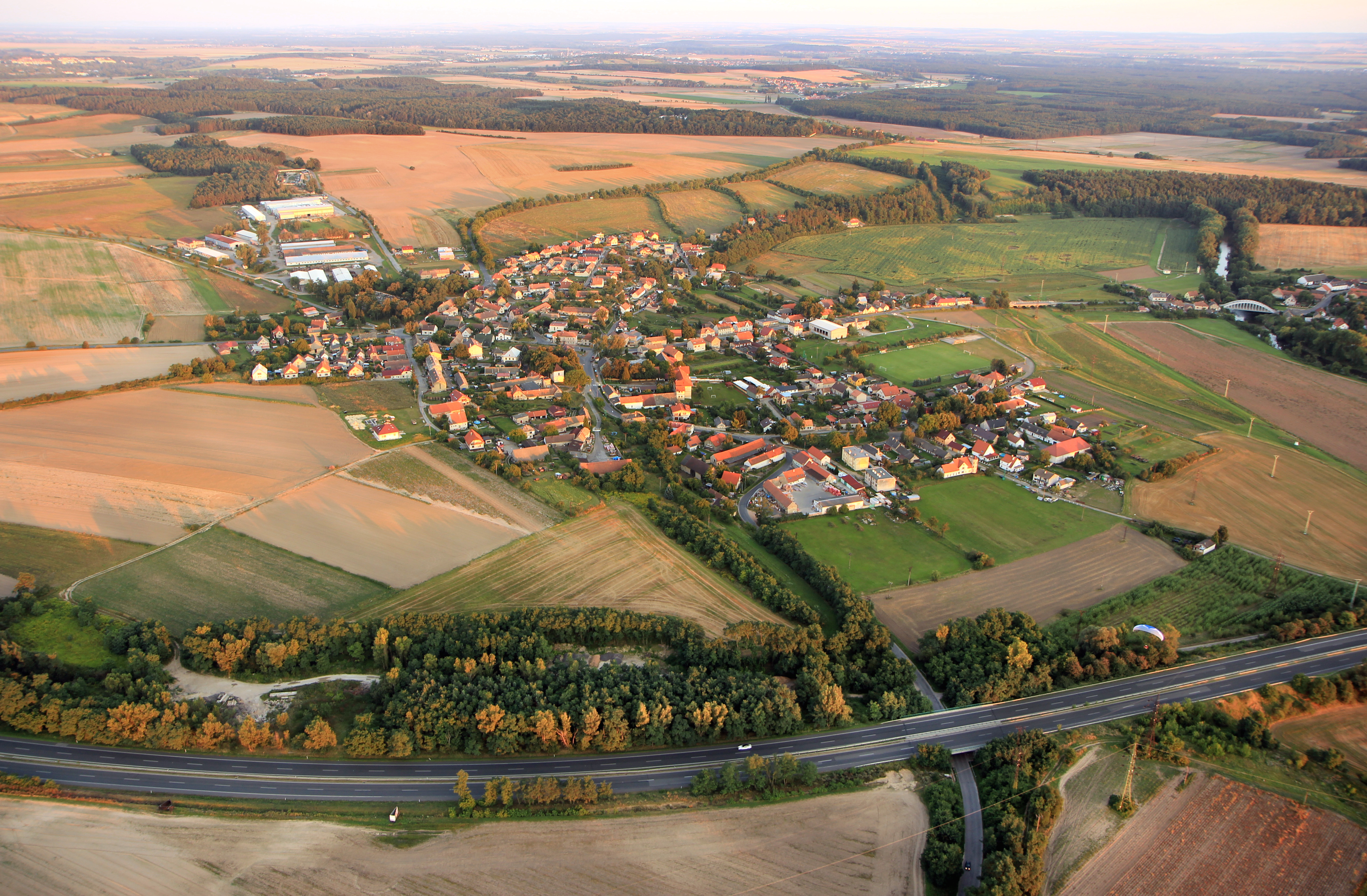
- Aerial view

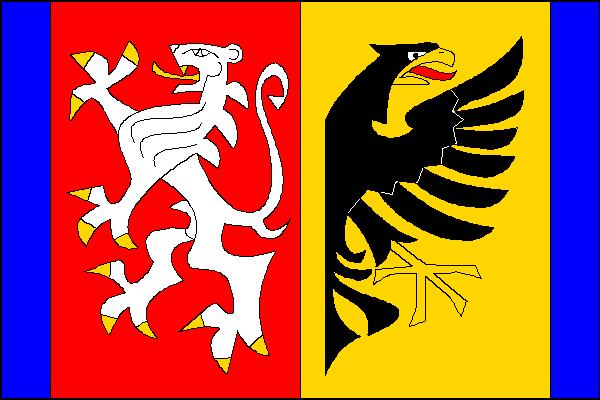
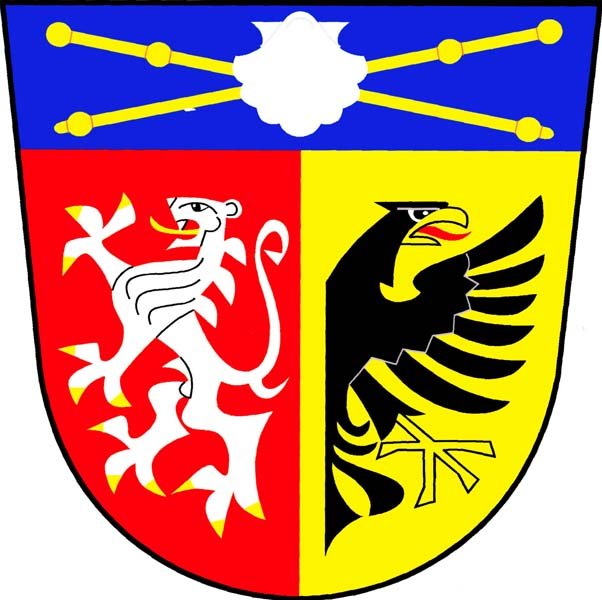
- Flag Coat of arms

- Location in the Czech Republic
- Coordinates: 50°15′20″N 14°46′53″E
- Country: Czech Republic
- Region: Central Bohemian
- District: Mladá Boleslav
- First mentioned: 1352

Area
  - Total: 9.16 km^{2} (3.54 sq mi)
- Elevation: 188 m (617 ft)

Population (2026-01-01)
  - Total: 996
  - Density: 109/km^{2} (282/sq mi)
- Time zone: UTC+1 (CET)
  - Summer (DST): UTC+2 (CEST)
- Postal code: 294 74
- Website: www.predmericenadjizerou.cz

Předměřice nad Jizerou is a municipality and village in Mladá Boleslav District in the Central Bohemian Region of the Czech Republic. It has about 1,000 inhabitants.

== Administrative division ==
Předměřice nad Jizerou consists of two municipal parts (in brackets population according to the 2021 census):

- Předměřice nad Jizerou (896)
- Kačov (40)

== Etymology ==
The name Předměřice is derived from the personal name Předmír, meaning "the village of Předmír's people".

== Geography ==
Předměřice nad Jizerou is located about 20 kilometres (12 mi) southwest of Mladá Boleslav and 25 km (16 mi) northeast of Prague. It lies in the Jizera Table. The municipality is situated on the left bank of the Jizera River, which forms the northern and western municipal border.

== History ==
The first written mention of Předměřice nad Jizerou is from 1352. For most of its history, it was part of the Brandýs estate.

== Demographics ==
Historical population

Year	Pop.	±%
1869	712	—
1880	786	+10.4%
1890	776	−1.3%
1900	846	+9.0%
1910	952	+12.5%

Year	Pop.	±%
1921	895	−6.0%
1930	861	−3.8%
1950	666	−22.6%
1961	727	+9.2%
1970	706	−2.9%

Year	Pop.	±%
1980	646	−8.5%
1991	628	−2.8%
2001	597	−4.9%
2011	685	+14.7%
2021	936	+36.6%

Source: Censuses

== Transport ==
The D10 motorway from Prague to Turnov runs through the municipality.

== Sights ==
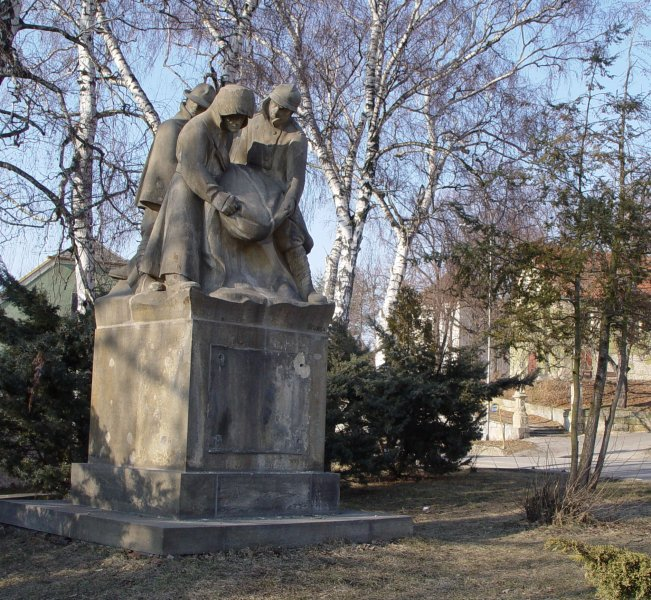
Burial in the Carpathians Memorial

A monument dedicated to the deceased in World War I, Burial in the Carpathians, is located in the village. It was made by Jan Štursa in 1921.
