= Christian Davies =

Irishwoman who joined the British Army in 1693 disguised as a man

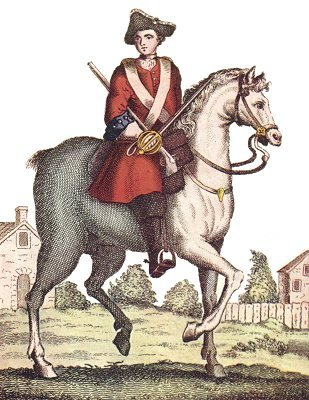
- 1706 illustration of Kit Cavanagh
- Born: Christian Cavanagh; 1667; Dublin
- Died: 7 July 1739 (aged 71–72) Royal Hospital Chelsea
- Buried: Royal Hospital Chelsea
- Spouses: Richard Welsh (died 1709) Hugh Jones (m. 1709; died 1710) ? Davies (after 1713)
- Children: 3

Christian Davies (1667 – 7 July 1739), born Christian Cavanagh, also known as Kit Cavanagh or Mother Ross, was an Irishwoman who joined the English Army in 1693 disguised as a man. She fought with the infantry in Flanders during the Nine Years' War until 1697, then with the Scottish Army in the 4th Dragoons, later the 2nd Royal North British Dragoons and finally with the Scots Greys in the War of the Spanish Succession from 1701 to 1706. The author Daniel Defoe met her in old age when she was a Chelsea Pensioner and turned her story into a book entitled The Life and Adventures of Mrs. Christian Davies.

== Early life ==
Christian "Kit" Cavanagh was born in 1667 in Dublin, Ireland. Throughout her life, she would use the surnames Welsh, Welch, Ross, Jones, and Davies. She was the daughter of a local brewer. Although her parents were Protestants, they supported King James II during his campaign in Ireland. Her father served with the Jacobite army, dying as a result of wounds at the Battle of Aughrim. Her family's property was confiscated as a result of their support for the Jacobite cause.

As a teenager, she became involved with a relative of her mother's. Unable to care for her—some accounts have her fleeing her mother—Kit Cavanagh went to live with her aunt who ran a public house in Dublin. Soon, she met and married Richard Welsh (some sources have him down as Richard Walsh), a servant of her aunt's. After her aunt's death, she inherited the pub. Despite her relative youth, she ran the pub as her own, with Richard being one of the waiters. They had two children, and she was pregnant with a third when, suddenly, Richard disappeared in 1691.

== Searching for her lost husband ==
=== Infantryman ===
Under circumstances that are unclear, her husband ended up in the English or Scottish Army. Some accounts have him volunteering while others have him being pressed into the army. In either event, he apparently attempted to write to her to inform her of his situation. Eventually, one of the letters made it to her, telling Cavanagh that he was in the Army serving in Holland. Unwilling to simply lose her husband, Cavanagh placed her children in the care of her mother, cut her hair, and disguised herself as a man to join the English Army to find her lost husband.

Initially, Cavanagh joined Captain Tichborne's company of foot under the name Christopher Welch. As an infantryman, she fought at the Battle of Landen. There she was wounded and captured by the French. In 1694, she was exchanged and returned to the English Army, who were still unaware of her true sex.

After being exchanged, she continued to soldier on in the Army, still looking for her husband. She remained a member of Tichborne's company until she became embroiled in a dispute with a sergeant of the company, whom she killed in a duel over a woman. Following the duel, and possibly as a result of it, Welch was allowed to be discharged from the army.

=== Dragoon ===
Once discharged, she promptly enlisted with the Scottish Army, this time in 2nd Royal North British Dragoons (known at the time [and later] as the Scots Greys) in 1697. As a dragoon, she took part in the fighting until the Peace of Ryswick. Demobilised at the end of the war, she had yet to find her husband. Still looking for him, she would eventually re-enlist with the Scots Greys when the War of the Spanish Succession began in 1701.

Somehow, she managed to conceal the fact that she was a woman. As Marian Broderick noted, "Amazingly, she managed to do this without being discovered: she ate with them, drank with them, slept with them, played cards with them, even urinated alongside them by using what she describes as a 'silver tube with leather straps'. No one was ever the wiser." She was so successful at passing herself off as a man that a prostitute claimed she was the father of her child. Rather than give proof that this was impossible, Cavanagh paid child support to the woman.

During her time as a dragoon, Cavanagh grew to enjoy the life of a soldier. She particularly seemed to enjoy the marauding and looting that followed in the wake of battles. For a woman who had been successful in business, she was alleged to be just as successful a marauder.

Fighting with the Scots Greys, she was wounded at the Battle of Schellenberg. Not willing to be sidelined by the musket ball that remained in her upper thigh, she was with the regiment at the Battle of Blenheim. After the battle, she was assigned to guard French prisoners. There she found, after 13 years of searching, her husband. Richard Welsh was then a private in the 1st Regiment of Foot. According to some accounts, she recognized him while he was trying to pick up a Dutch woman. Welch claimed he had sent her numerous letters, none of which ever reached her. Having found her husband with another woman, she refused to go back to him, preferring to remain a dragoon in the Scots Greys.

Despite her anger at having found her husband cheating, the two remained somewhat close. The pair agreed to not reveal her identity, instead pretending to be brothers. The deception worked, with no one in the regiment suspecting her of being a woman, even though she was known as the "pretty dragoon".

Welch's life as trooper continued until 1706 and the Battle of Ramillies. There she was again wounded, this time fracturing her skull. When the regimental surgeon treated her, he discovered that Christian Welsh was in fact a woman. The news of the discovery soon spread through the Scottish cavalry brigade. Eventually Lord John Hay, the Scots Greys brigade commander, intervened, having Cavanagh's husband brought from the 1st Regiment of Foot. After hearing the whole story from Cavanagh, he ordered that her pay be continued while she remained under the care of the army.

== Sutler ==
Once she was well enough, Cavanagh, now back to being called Mrs Welsh, was formally discharged from the Scots Greys. As part of her discharge, the officers of the Scots Greys paid for a new wardrobe for her. Some sources have reported that she fought openly as a woman; however, this is unlikely. She was, apparently, carried on strength as a wife and a sutler. After the Battle of Ramillies, there is no evidence that she continued to serve as a dragoon. She was allowed to remain with the army as an official wife on strength with the 1st Foot as a sutler.

Although accounts list her as being a faithful wife, her husband's reputation is the opposite. Even after being reunited with his wife, Richard Welsh continued to see other women. When Cavanagh discovered one of his mistresses was still following the regiment, Cavanagh attacked the woman, cutting off her nose. However, at the Battle of Malplaquet, her husband died. Cavanagh spent much of the day after the battle searching for her husband's body, turning over as many as two hundred bodies before finding him so that she could bury him.

After the death of her husband, she became involved with a Captain Ross of the Scots Greys. Forever afterwards, she was known in the regiment as "Mother Ross". She did not marry Ross, instead marrying another dragoon of the Scots Greys, Hugh Jones, three months after the Battle of Malplaquet. Jones died at the Siege of Saint-Venant in 1710.

== Return from the continent ==
In 1712, as the War of the Spanish Succession was winding down, Cavanagh returned home with the troops. Because of her extraordinary tale, she was presented at court to Queen Anne. Queen Anne granted her a bounty of £50 and a shilling a day for the rest of her life as a pension.

Finally returning to Dublin in 1713, she married for the third and final time. Her third husband, like the rest, was a soldier. His name was Davies.

She lived in Dublin for some years, opening a new pub, but her years in the army had left her and her husband unsuited to settled life. For many years, they moved about England and Ireland, making a living through a variety of jobs, as well as her celebrity status among the military. Eventually, she was admitted to the Royal Hospital Chelsea as one of its pensioners.

Mrs Davies was buried, at her request, with full military honours with other military pensioners at the Royal Hospital Chelsea.
