= Sylvin Rubinstein =

Russian dancer (1914–2011)

Sylvin Rubinstein (1914 in Moscow – April 30, 2011 in Hamburg) was a Jewish-Russian dancer and cross-dresser, who was a member of the resistance to Nazism during World War II.

== Pre-War ==
Rubinstein was born in 1917 in Russia. He left Russia for Poland with his mother and his twin sister Maria, when his aristocrat father was executed by the Bolsheviks. Sylvin and Maria earned money by dancing in the town marketplace. By their teens, they were dancing professionally, as a flamenco act billed as Imperio y Dolores. As Imperio and Dolores they headlined at music halls throughout Europe, as well New York and in Australia.

== Nazi Occupation of Poland ==
The siblings were performing at Warsaw's Adria Theatre when Germany invaded Poland on September 1, 1939. They were consigned to the Warsaw Ghetto. Rubinstein says that he managed to escape the ghetto, wresting a machine gun from a guard and killing several Gestapo officers.

== Entry into the Resistance ==
Rubinstein's biography, 'Dolores & Imperio: Die drei Leben des Sylvin Rubinstein' ('Dolores and Imperio: the Three Lives of Sylvin Rubenstein') contains an account of his work in the Polish resistance. He claims that he was recruited into the resistance by an anti-Nazi German officer, Major Kurt Werner.

"One day a big, tall German army officer spotted me and kept staring at me...He followed me and then walked up to me and I thought, well, this is it."

It turned out the officer, Wehrmacht Major Kurt Werner, was a fan of Imperio y Dolores and remembered Rubinstein from an appearance in Berlin before the war.

Werner arranged for fake ID papers for Rubinstein and his sister and urged them to head for Switzerland. But his sister insisted on trying to fetch their mother, still back in Brody.

"I saw her board the train heading east and I knew as we waved to each other that that was the last time I’d ever see her...I could have insisted she stay with me. But I didn't. That is one of two things I’ve always regretted."

Both his mother and sister died in Treblinka. Rubinstein remained in Warsaw, and was recruited into the Polish resistance by Major Werner. He became an accomplished assassin and saboteur.

Rubinstein used his ability to pass as a woman in these missions. For example, he recalled that a Gestapo officer "was a particularly nasty Nazi who took positive delight in finding Jews who were hidden in people’s homes...he would have the Jews dragged off and also the German families who had sheltered them. Very nasty, indeed. Everybody in Berlin feared and hated him, Jews and Goyim alike...well, one fine day it was his birthday and a very elegant-looking lady (if I do say so myself) showed up at his office with a bunch of red roses, asking to see him alone."

== Post-War ==
After the war, Rubinstein returned to dancing. "Becoming Dolores was my way of coping with my twin sister’s death...only a twin can understand how horrific that was. It was like being torn in half. Not a day goes by that I don’t think of her." In Allied-occupied Germany Rubinstein testified on Major Werner's behalf before a US board to win his freedom.

Rubinstein, in his female guise as Dolores, went on to become a major music hall entertainer in the 1950s. But advancing age and changing tastes took their toll.

Reduced to performing in seedy clubs in Hamburg's Reeperbahn, he retired around 1970.

"I was dancing in a place where the headline act was a couple having sex on stage. That was when I said, 'Dolores, it’s time to hang up the castanets.'"

Sylvin Rubinstein died on the 30 of April 2011, before he was living in an apartment just off the Reeperbahn in the harbour district of Hamburg. A documentary, Er tanzte das Leben (Dancing His Life), was made of his life story.

== Books ==
- Kuno Kruse: "Dolores & Imperio. Die drei Leben des Sylvin Rubinstein". Kiepenheuer&Witsch, Köln 2000. ISBN 978-3-462-02926-0.
