= Anna Maria Christmann =

- Born: 1697
- Died: 1760 (aged 62–63)
- Allegiance: Habsburg Monarchy
- Conflicts: Ottoman–Venetian War

Anna Maria Christmann (1697–1760), was a German soldier. She served as a soldier under Prince Eugene of Savoy during the Ottoman–Venetian War (1714–1718) in 1715–1718. She became famous in her time and her story was published several times from 1833 onward.

== Sources ==
- Helmut Engisch: Eine Jungfrau im Türkenkrieg: Wie die Anna Maria Christmann als württembergischer Grenadier das Abendland retten half und dann in Stuttgart Briefträgerin wurde. In: Helmut Engisch: Ein Mönch fliegt übers Schwabenland. Theiss, Stuttgart 1996, ISBN 3-8062-1270-8
