= Maria van Antwerpen =

Dutch soldier (1719–1781)

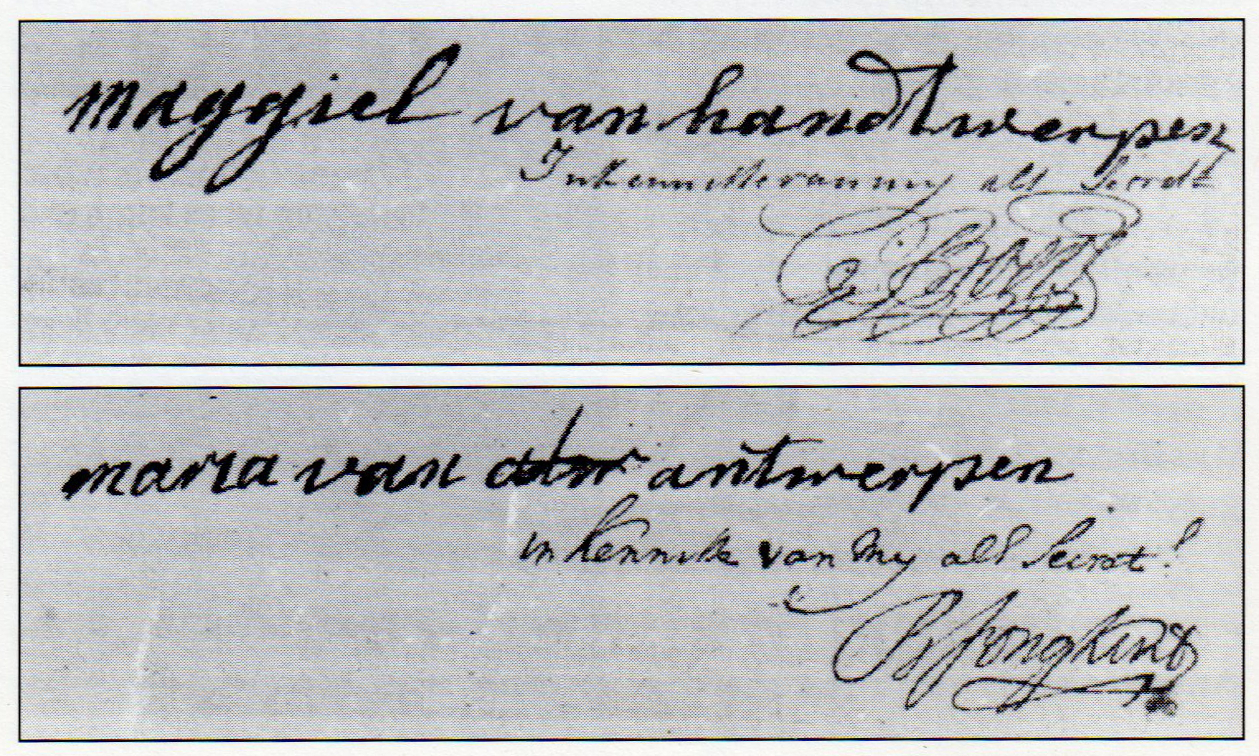

Maria van Antwerpen (1719 – 1781) was a Dutch soldier and seamstress who dressed as a man to enlist in the Dutch States Army. van Antwerpen was possibly a trans man, and is considered by the Dutch historians Rudolf Dekker and L.J.M. van de Pol to have been transsexual. van Antwerpen married twice to women. Two biographies were published about van Antwerpen while still alive, one by Franciscus Lievens Kersteman in 1751.

== Life ==
Van Antwerpen was born in Breda, the daughter of a brewer. van Antwerpen was orphaned at thirteen and worked as a servant maid until being fired in the middle of winter in 1745. van Antwerpen enlisted in the Dutch States Army as Jan van Ant in 1746 and married the sergeant daughter Johanna Cramers in 1748. Recognised by a former employer in 1751, van Antwerpen was put on trial for making a mockery of marriage by entering an illegal marriage, and sentenced to exile from all garrison cities.

van Antwerpen worked as a seamstress until 1762, and then married Cornelia Swartsenberg, who had fallen pregnant after a rape, and enlisted again. This child died at birth, but Cornelia, who was likely a prostitute, become pregnant again later. This child was baptised with van Antwerpen as the father. The godfather and godmother were Maria's brother and his wife, so they apparently had no problem with the role of Maria.

In 1769, van Antwerpen was recognised by someone who knew her as a seamstress, and van Antwerpen was put on trial again. Swartsenberg fled, and van Antwerpen was exiled to the area of Holland, in an early example of criminalization of gender transition. It was believed that Maria died in Breda, but later research showed this was someone with the same name. As during the trial Maria stated she had vowed ever lasting loyalty to Swartsenberg; it is possible that she lived elsewhere under different names.

During the trial in Gouda, when asked if she was a man or woman, she replied "by appearance a woman, by nature a man". The reports of the trial can still be requested at the archives of the city of Gouda.

== See also ==
- List of Dutch people

== Sources ==
- Isa Edholm: Kvinnohistoria, Alfabeta Bokförlag AB, Stockholm, Falun 2001. ISBN 91-501-0054-8. (in Swedish)
- Antwerpen, Maria van, Instituut voor Nederlandse Geschiedenis (in Dutch)
- Rudolf Dekker & Lotte van de Pol. Vrouwen in mannenkleren; De geschiedenis van een tegendraadse traditie; Europa 1500-1800. Amsterdam, Wereldbibliotheek, 1989. (in Dutch)
