= Stephanie Hollenstein =

Austrian painter

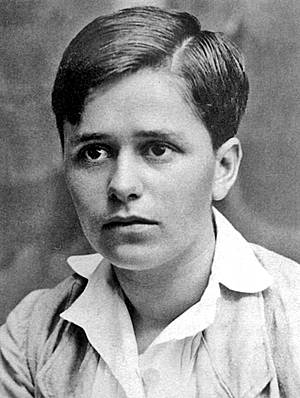
- Born: July 18, 1886; Lustenau
- Died: May 24, 1944 (aged 57); Vienna
- Education: Königliche Kunstgewerbeschule München
- Occupation: Artist

Stephanie Hollenstein (18 July 1886 – 24 May 1944) was an Austrian Expressionist landscape and still-life painter. A member of the Nazi Party, Hollenstein was lesbian and tried to defend fellow-artists against charges of degeneracy, though usually without success. She was nicknamed Die Schiefmalerin, meaning the Crooked Lady Painter.

== Biography ==
Hollenstein was born to a peasant farming family in 1886, and initially worked as a cowherd in Lustenau, Vorarlberg. Her first paintings were made at that time, featuring animals and shepherds, with brushes made from animal hair and colors from berries. In 1904, she was admitted with a scholarship to the Königliche Kunstgewerbeschule in Munich, on the strength of the drawings she presented as samples. After completing the courses there in 1908 and earning a distinction grade, she opened a small private painting school in Schwabing, which was in operation for two years. In 1913, upon the recommendation of Franz von Defregger, she was awarded a scholarship that enabled her to study for a year in Italy.

=== World War I ===
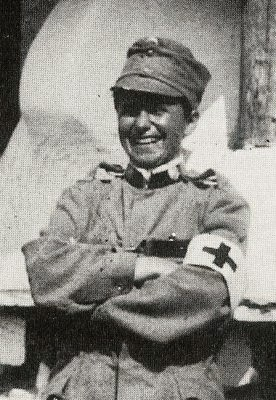
Hollenstein in World War I.

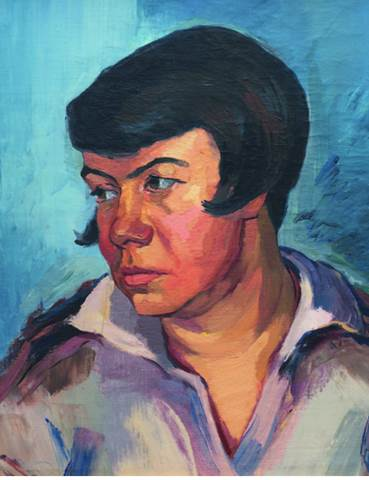
Portrait of Dr. Franziska Groß.

At the beginning of World War I, in Summer 1914, she completed a Red Cross Nursing training course. She then went to Vorarlberg, where she joined the 2nd Dornbirn Battalion, Company II of the Standschützen under the male name "Stephan Hollenstein". She dressed in male clothes and was deployed to the Tyrolean war zone near Bolzano in May 1915. Although her comrades-in-arms were aware of the deception regarding her gender, her superiors did not discover it for several months; in August 1915 she was sent home.

This incident attracted public attention and fame, however, and she was assigned as a war painter for the Austro-Hungarian Army’s "Kriegspressequartier" (War Press Bureau). In that capacity, she was sent to the Italian front on three occasions and, in 1916, was among the first recipients of the Karl Troop Cross. She later received numerous commissions from the Museum of Military History.

After the war, she lived in Vienna with her companion, Franziska Groß (1900-1973), who later became a doctor, and held several exhibitions with the Künstlerhaus Wien, the Vienna Secession and the Hagenbund. Her activities were interrupted for a time in 1928, following an accident that resulted in a double ankle fracture, but she was able to get treatment from Lorenz Böhler, a doctor who is credited with establishing the field of accident surgery. She recovered completely and made extensive travels through Germany and Italy.

=== Nazi years ===
In the 1930s, she was attracted to the "Männlichkeitskult" (Masculinity Cult) and the military ideals promoted by the Fascists. She became a secret member of the Nazi Party (when it was still officially banned in Austria), then rejoined openly after the Anschluss. From that time until 1943, she was chairperson of the "Vereinigung Bildender Künstlerinnen der Reichsgaue der Ostmark" (Association of Women Artists of the Reichsgau of Austria). During her tenure, she defended the sculptor, Albert Bechtold, and others against charges that their art was "Degenerate"; unsuccessfully for the most part. She remained openly lesbian and her own same-sex desire was tolerated as long as it did not cause a public sensation. An application for the title of "Professor" was denied on the grounds that she was a strictly local artist whose work often did not set a good example.

She resigned her position for health reasons. The following year, she suffered a heart attack and died shortly after. Her remains were returned to Lustenau for burial. A municipal art gallery named in her honor was opened in 1971, which houses most of her extant work (1,114 numbered items).

== Selected paintings ==
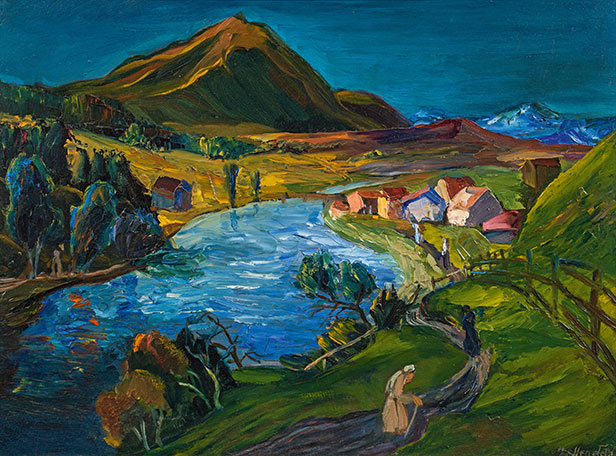
Landscape with an Inn

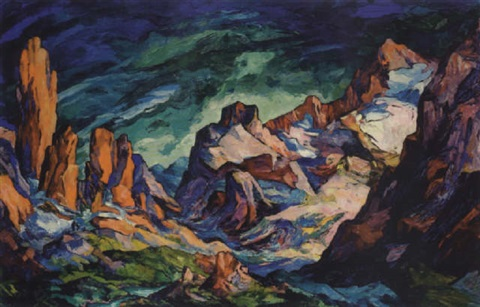
Lago Zoi in the Dolomites

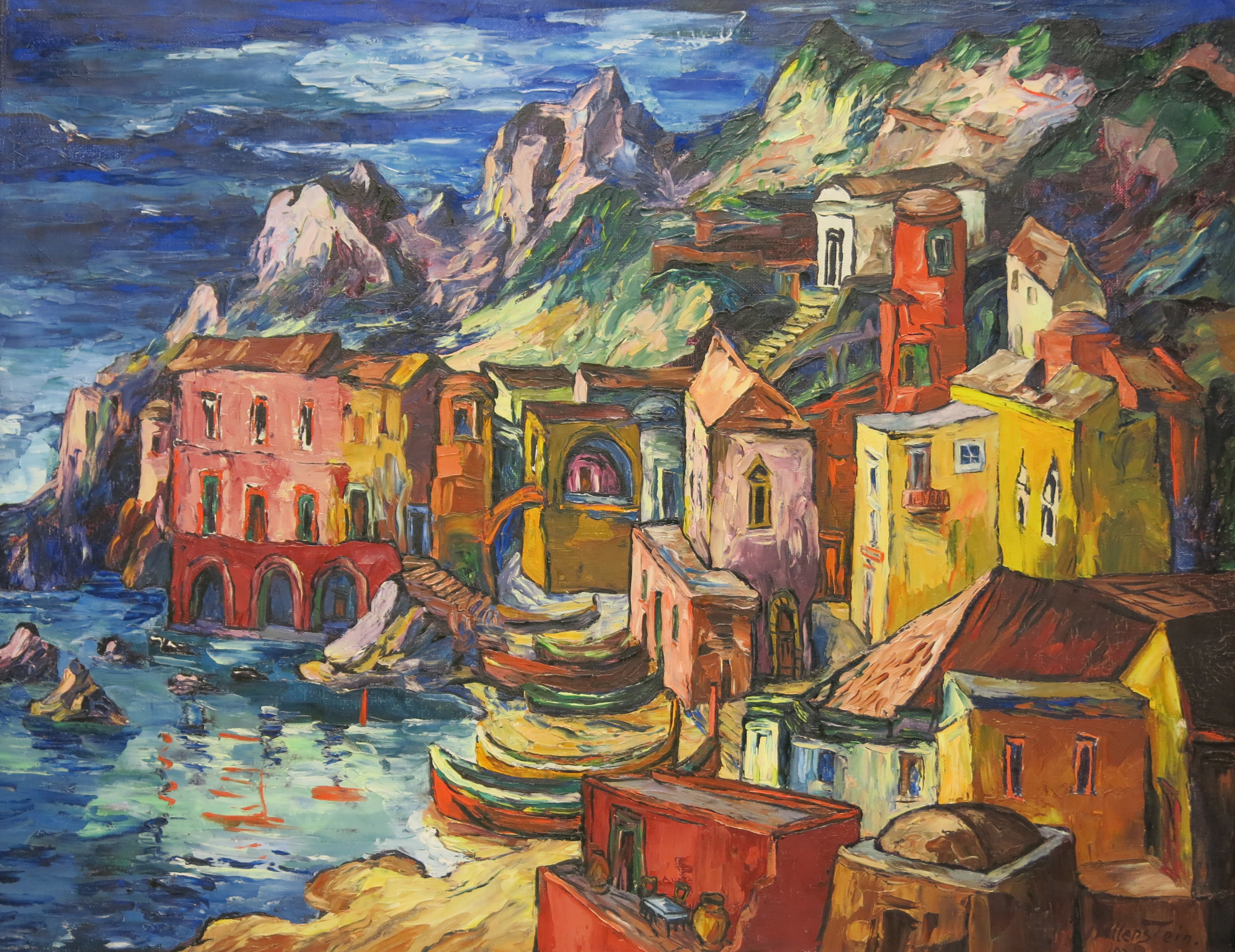
Cetara, Campania
