= Katharina Marschall =

18th Century Austrian female soldier who concealed her gender

Katharina Marschall (1740 – c. 1820) was a female soldier. She achieved fame in the Habsburg monarchy during the second half of the 18th century as a "latter-day amazon". She became a soldier and concealed her gender for six years till her mother (who had believed she was making a life for herself as a domestic servant in Prague) discovered the truth and betrayed her secret.

== Life ==
Katharina Marschall was born in Předměřice nad Labem, a village near Hradec Králové. Her father was a soldier, but he died when she was 14, leaving the family in some difficulty. Katharina was sent away to Prague to work as a children's maid. While she was away her younger brother, Johann, was conscripted into the army. He was sent to Prague where he sought out his sister. Tearfully he told her that he would sooner end his life in the Vltava River than join the army. Katharina gave him a little money and told him to come back that night. By the time he came back Katharina had made her decision. This involved swapping clothes with her brother. Pausing only to explain to her employer that her mother was gravely ill and she needed to go home, she marched into the barracks of the 6th Dragoon Regiment of Count Kolowrat-Krakowsky, dressed in her brothers' uniform and giving her brother's name.

Johann returned home and explained he had been rejected by the army as unfit. Katharina, pretending to be Johann, served in the regiment for six years. She even managed to conceal her gender when she had to spend time in hospital on account of a head injury received in a skirmish with a Bavarian border patrol. However, at the end of those six years her mother discovered that her daughter had not been working in Prague as a servant, but had been pretending to be a man and serving in the army.

News of the affair found its way back to the regiment, and from there to the streets of Prague, the state capital. From there it travelled via the General Command to the Court War Council in the imperial capital, Vienna, which meant that the Empress Maria Theresa became aware of it. The empress invited the dragoonista to Vienna. Katharina demonstrated her horseback skills at the riding school, she "fought" on horseback and showed off her shooting skills. The empress was impressed, and ordered that Katharina be formally discharged from the army and generously paid off. A few years later Katharina married Sergeant Josef Fiala of the Fifteenth Infantry Regiment. She accompanied her husband when the regiment was deployed in a war against Ottoman Empire, sharing with him in the dangers and stresses of the front line. However, she subsequently lost him to the plague in Hungary.

After she was widowed she returned from Hungary to Bohemia. As an eighty year old she was living as a matriarch in Libeň near Prague, living in poverty but supporting herself after a fashion in the flower trade during the summers and dealing in bric-à-brac during the winters. The soldiers at the Prague Garrison found out about "the old dragoonista" ("die alte Dragonerin"), as she became known, and provided her with support. However, by the time she died, during the 1820s, she was alone and unmourned.
