= Geneviève Prémoy =

French officer

Geneviève Prémoy, alias Chevalier Balthazard (1660–1706), was a legendary French officer. Premoy made a career in the army of Louis XIV and became famous in contemporary France after a popular - possibly fictionalised - biography was published.

Premoy was born in Guise in Picardie. As a teenager, Premoy ran away from home after a domestic conflict, and proceeded to dress in male clothing and enlist in the regiment of the Prince of Condé in 1676. Premoy was eventually promoted, and rose through the ranks due to bravery in battle, including participating in the Siege of Philippsburg (1688).

Their actions were uncovered when they were wounded in the breast during the Siege of Mons (1691). They were called to Versailles, where Louis XIV made them an honorary knight of the Order of St Louis. Premoy was fired from the army but given a pension and allowed to keep their rank, and though they were ordered to wear a skirt, they continued to dress as a man on the upper part of their body.

A supposed autobiography, Histoire de la Dragone: contenant les actions de Genevieve Premoy, was published in 1703.
