= Franziska Scanagatta =

Italian woman who served as an Austrian army officer in disguise

Francesca Scanagatta
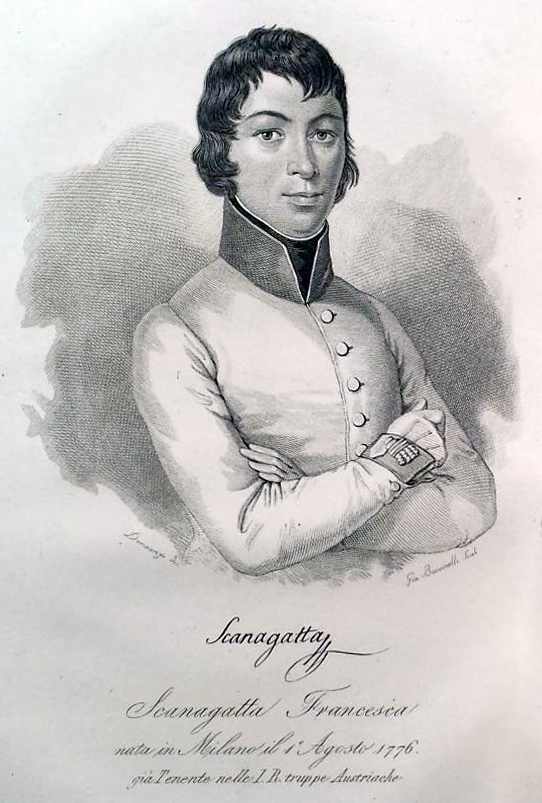
- Portrait of Scanagatta
- Native name: Franziska Scanagatta
- Born: 1 August 1776; Milan, Duchy of Milan
- Died: 1865 (aged 88–89) Milan
- Allegiance: Habsburg monarchy
- Service years: 1794–1800
- Rank: Leutnant (Lieutenant)
- Conflicts: War of the Second Coalition; Siege of Genoa
- Spouse: Spini
- Children: 4

Franziska Scanagatta or Francesca Scanagatta (1 August 1776 – 1865) was an Italian woman who served as an officer in the army of the Habsburg monarchy after disguising herself as a man in order to enter the Theresian Military Academy in Wiener Neustadt in 1794.

Admitted under the male identity "Franz Scanagatta", she completed the academy's course of study and in 1797 was commissioned as a Fähnrich (ensign) in the army of the Holy Roman Empire. She subsequently served during the French Revolutionary Wars and was promoted to Leutnant (lieutenant) in 1800.

Her identity eventually became known to the authorities, and she resigned her commission in June 1800. In recognition of her service, Francis I of Austria granted her a pension.

== Early life ==
Francesca Antonia Scanagatta was born on 1 August 1776 in Milan, then the capital of the Duchy of Milan under the rule of the Habsburg monarchy. She was the daughter of Isabella De Villata and Giuseppe Scanagatta, a financial administrator originally from Dongo on Lake Como. Contemporary records indicate that the family was large; several siblings are mentioned in surviving sources, including Vincenzo, Giovanni Battista, Giovanni, Marianna, Rachele, and Maria.

Scanagatta grew up in northern Italy at a time when Lombardy formed part of the Habsburg domains. Later accounts describe her as physically slight but determined, and note that from a young age she attempted to strengthen her health through regular exercise. She also developed a strong interest in reading and study, pursuits that were uncommon for girls of the period, whose education was typically directed toward domestic roles.

Around 1792, when she was about fifteen years old, the Scanagatta family moved from Milan to Treviso. The move took place during a period of growing political instability in Europe, as the conflicts that followed the French Revolution began to affect the territories of northern Italy.

== Military academy ==
In 1794, aged 17, Francesca Scanagatta travelled north from northern Italy with her brother Giacomo Scanagatta, who had been selected by their father to pursue a military career at the Theresian Military Academy in Wiener Neustadt, the principal officer-training institution of the Habsburg army. Francesca herself was expected to continue to Vienna, where arrangements had been made for her to complete her education in a private household.

During the journey, however, her brother became ill and admitted that he had little desire to enter military service. According to later accounts, Scanagatta proposed that he return home with a servant while she continued the journey in his place. Before parting, he entrusted her with the letter of introduction intended for the academy, addressed to Dr. Haller, surgeon to the staff responsible for receiving new cadets.

Already travelling in male clothing for convenience during the journey, she proceeded to Wiener Neustadt and presented herself under the name "Franz Scanagatta". Haller accepted the new arrival as the expected cadet and arranged for the student to lodge in a private house rather than in the academy barracks, a circumstance that helped prevent the deception from being discovered.

Scanagatta was formally admitted to the academy on 1 July 1794. Over the following three years she studied military subjects including mathematics, fortification, and artillery, while also improving her knowledge of German and French and learning English. She trained in weapons handling and in both mounted and infantry exercises, and her instructors regarded her as a capable and diligent student.

In 1796 the academy surgeon, Dr. Haller, wrote to her father in support of the cadet's continued training, describing the young student as "as though he were my own son" and urging that he be allowed to remain at the academy.

At one point, her father travelled to Wiener Neustadt in an attempt to persuade her to abandon the academy. Because his German was limited, he questioned the instructors in Latin about the conduct of "his daughter". Unaware of the situation, the professors replied using masculine forms, assuming they were discussing a son, and spoke approvingly of the cadet's progress.

Scanagatta completed the course of study in early 1797. On 16 February 1797, aged 20, she passed the academy's final examination and was commissioned as a Fähnrich (ensign) in the army of the Holy Roman Empire, beginning the military career she had pursued under the identity of "Franz Scanagatta".

Her commissioning marked the beginning of several years of active service in the Habsburg army during the French Revolutionary Wars.

== Military service ==
In that rank, Scanagatta joined the 6th composite battalion, Warasdin Grenz District (combined Infanterie Regimenter No. 65 & 66), leading a reinforcement troop from Hungary to the battalion at Kehl on the Rhine just as the war ended in April 1797. In December, she marched with them to winter quarters in Troppau, Silesia and then to Klagenfurt in Styria. Always taking great care not to be discovered and trying to be amongst new people, she took the opportunity to take up a fellow cadet's posting to Infantry Regiment No. 56 "Wenzel Graf Colloredo" in the autumn of 1798. She also fulfilled her wish to see various parts of the Empire, as she first visited the regiment's base in Moravia before joining the Aushilfsbezirk (supplementary recruiting area) for the regiment in Galicia, where she arrived in September. She would regularly frequent the casino in Sandomir, where local society would gather, and was almost discovered when challenged by a local young man, who told her that some women thought Scanagatta was a woman. Her response was that she was glad to be judged by his wife, which was enough to persuade him to disbelieve the gossip.

In February 1799, she marched with her company to the War of the Second Coalition, but en route suffered a severe attack of rheumatism. After two months' ill health and recuperation, she was transferred to the Deutsch-Banater Grenz Regiment No.12 and travelled to its base at Pancsova in the area, which is now northern Serbia.

With GR12, Scanagatta marched to Italy, where she continued to show her determination and endured exhausting marches, relying on her motto: "Una verace risoluta virtù non trova impresa impossibile a lei" (Real strength of mind finds nothing impossible). When one of Francesca's army comrades teased her for being small, she challenged him to a duel and wounded him.

In December 1799, she led the attack on the French trenches at Barbagelata. Over the winter, she spent time with her family and they tried to persuade her to leave the army. Her mother had noticed medical issues arising from tying down her bosom underneath the uniform.

Promoted to Leutnant in March 1800, Scanagatta returned to the siege of Genoa in April, but her father informed the Austrian authorities of his daughter's presence in the army. She was obliged to resign on the very day Genoa fell, 4 June 1800. Her commander, Friedrich Heinrich von Gottesheim, held a party in her honour, where she was still treated as an ordinary officer.

== Later life and death ==
Back in Milan, Scanagatta met Lieutenant Spini of the Italian Presidential (later Royal) Guard, whom she married on 16 January 1804. They had four children, two boys and two girls, and when the boys were old enough they were allowed to wear their mother's medals, which she herself was not permitted to wear.

She died aged 89.

Her portrait hangs in the academy at Wiener Neustadt.

== See also ==
- Johanna Sophia Kettner
- Eleonore Prochaska
- Marie Schellinck
- Nadezhda Durova
