= Johanna Sophia Kettner =

German soldier

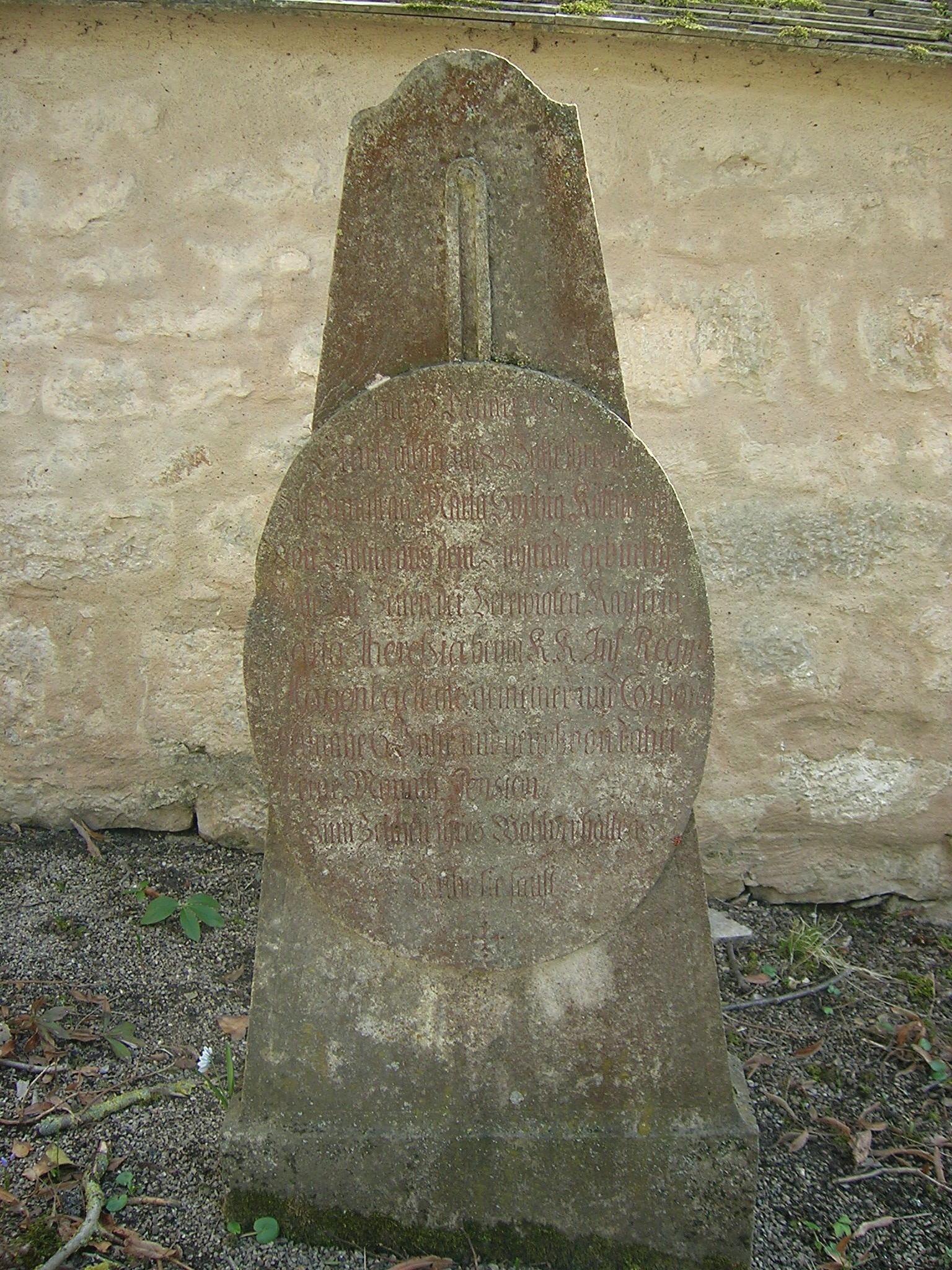
Gravestone

Johanna Sophia Kettner (24. January 1722 – 22 January 1802), was a German soldier.

She was born in Titting, Franconia, in 1722. In 1743, she enlisted in the Imperial Army in the guise of a man named Johann Kettner. She served in the prestigious Hagenbach infantry regiment of the Austrian army for about five years. During her service, she was promoted to the rank of corporal. As such, she was most likely the first of her gender in Austria, as this post was not legally available for women.

In 1748, while undergoing treatment for severe illness, she was discovered to be female and was discharged from the army with honours. Empress Maria Theresa granted her a lifelong pension as a corporal. Johanna Kettner died on 22 January 1802 in Eichstätt.

Kettner became known in history for her achievement which was unique for a woman in the Austrian army at the time.

== See also ==
- Franziska Scanagatta

== Sources ==
- von Duckner, Karl (1893). "Eine Amazone beim k.k. Infanterie-Regimente Hagenbach". Streffleurs Österreichische Militärische Zeitschrift. No. 3. p. 231.
