= 1709 in Sweden =

- Years in Sweden: 1706 1707 1708 1709 1710 1711 1712
- Centuries: 17th century · 18th century · 19th century
- Decades: 1670s 1680s 1690s 1700s 1710s 1720s 1730s
- Years: 1706 1707 1708 1709 1710 1711 1712

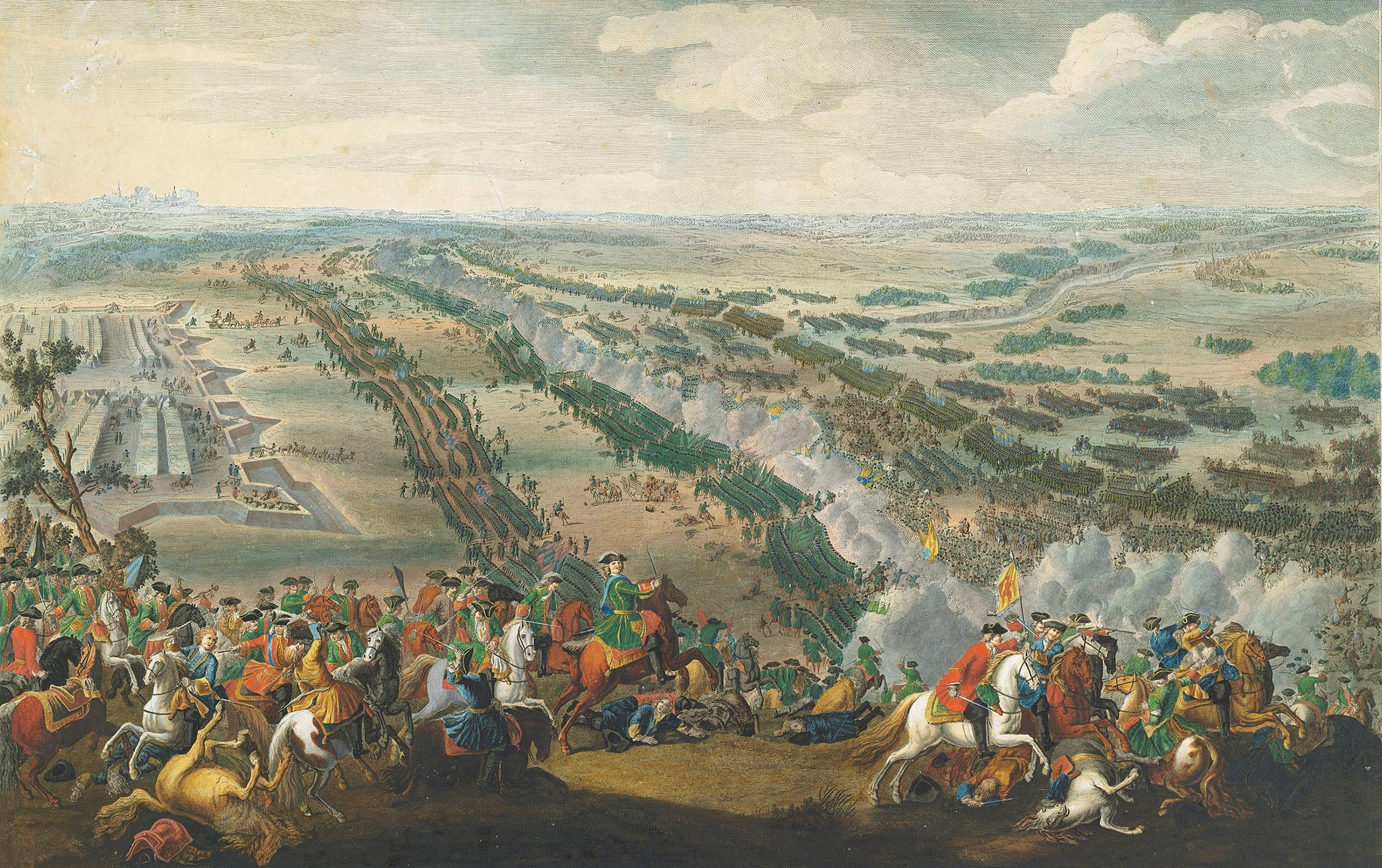
Marten's Poltava

Events from the year 1709 in Sweden

== Incumbents ==
- Monarch – Charles XII

== Events ==
- June 27 (June 28 in the Swedish calendar; July 8 New Style) – Great Northern War: Battle of Poltava: In Ukraine, Peter the Great, Tsar of Russia, defeats Charles XII of Sweden, thus effectively ending Sweden's role as a major power in Europe.
- The deposed Polish monarch Stanisław I of Poland is given refuge in Kristianstad in Sweden with his family, including Queen Catherine Opalińska and Marie Leszczyńska.

== Births ==
- 14 March - Sten Carl Bielke, official, scientist (died 1753)
- 11 July - Johan Gottschalk Wallerius, chemist and mineralogist (died 1785)
- Carl Johan Cronstedt, architect, inventor, Earl, noble, civil servant, scientist and bibliophile (died 1779)
- Henrika Juliana von Liewen, politically active baroness (died 1779)

== Deaths ==
- 17 February - Erik Benzelius the Elder, theologian and Archbishop of Uppsala (born 1632)
- 9 April - Israel Kolmodin, hymnwriter and Lutheran priest (born 1643)
- 24 May - Nils Gyldenstolpe (1642–1709), count, official and diplomat (born 1642)
- 28 June - Gustaf Adlerfelt, historical writer (born 1671)
- September 7 - Gunno Dahlstierna, poet (born 1661)
