= 1705 in Sweden =

- Years in Sweden: 1702 1703 1704 1705 1706 1707 1708
- Centuries: 17th century · 18th century · 19th century
- Decades: 1670s 1680s 1690s 1700s 1710s 1720s 1730s
- Years: 1702 1703 1704 1705 1706 1707 1708

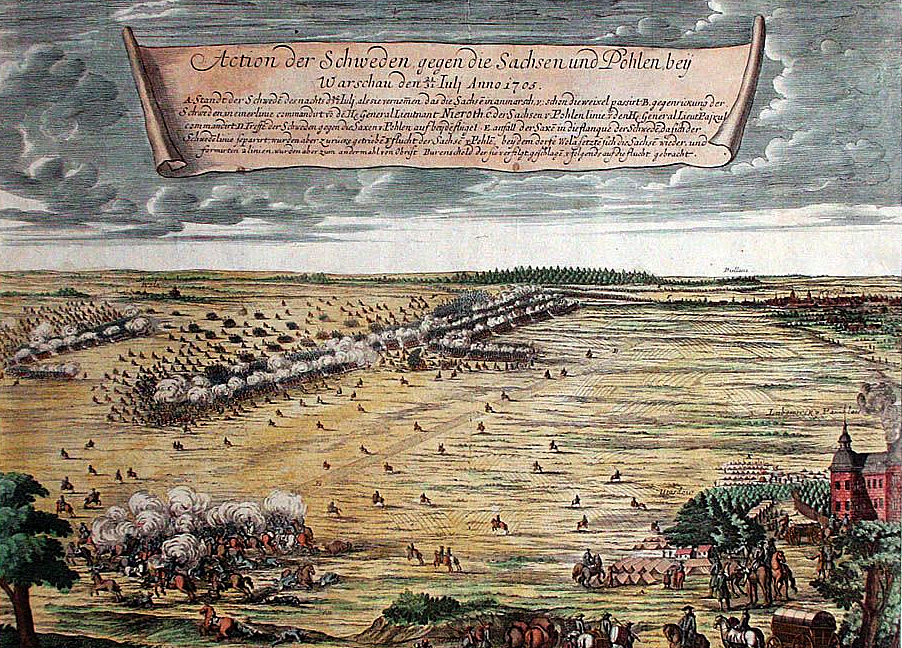
Battle of Warsaw (1705)

Events from the year 1705 in Sweden

== Incumbents ==
- Monarch – Charles XII

== Events ==
- 16 July - Battle of Gemauerthof
- 21 July - Battle of Warsaw (1705)
- 18 November – Pace between Sweden and Poland in the Treaty of Warsaw (1705).
- - Great Oulu Fire of 1705
- - The Maria Johansdotter case.

== Births ==
- 22 February - Peter Artedi, naturalist (died 1735)
- - Carl Wilhelm Cederhielm, courtier (died 1769)

== Deaths ==
- 8 February - Beata Magdalena Wittenberg, courtier (born 1644)
- 12 April - Henrik Florinus, priest, writer and translator (born 1633)
