= 1771 in Sweden =

- Years in Sweden: 1768 1769 1770 1771 1772 1773 1774
- Centuries: 17th century · 18th century · 19th century
- Decades: 1740s 1750s 1760s 1770s 1780s 1790s 1800s
- Years: 1768 1769 1770 1771 1772 1773 1774

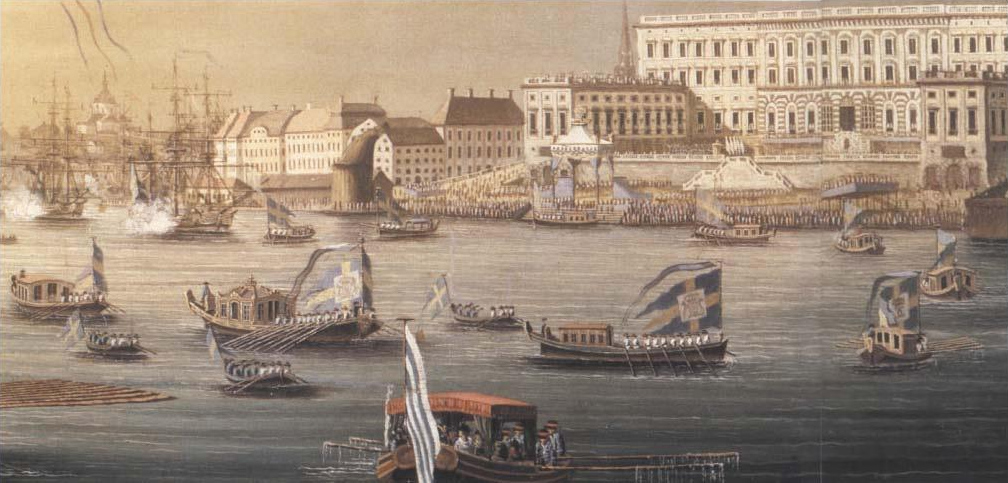
Hilleström

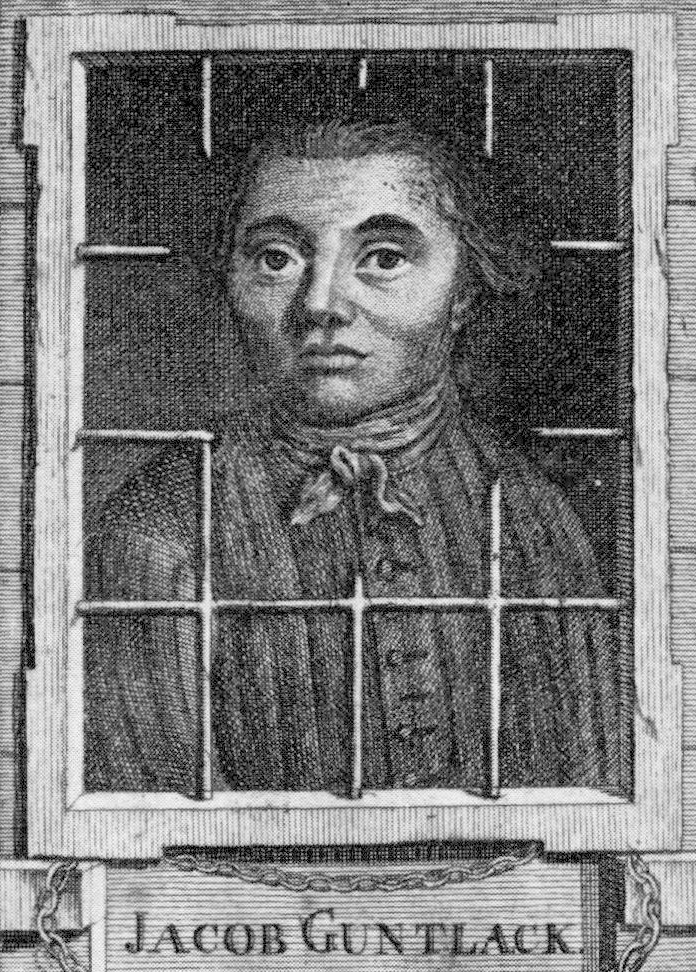
Jacob Guntlack

Events from the year 1771 in Sweden

== Incumbents ==
- Monarch – Adolf Frederick then Gustav III

== Events ==
- 12 February – Adolf Frederick, King of Sweden dies, and are succeeded by Gustav III of Sweden (at the time on a visit to France).
- 1 March - The news of the King's death reach Gustav III of Sweden in Paris.
- 30 May - Gustav III of Sweden returns to Sweden as monarch.
- 8 September – The Royal Swedish Academy of Music is created.
- - The Du Londel Troupe is dissolved.
- - Widespread famine in Sweden following a dry summer and then heavy rains during the late summer and fall, leading to widespread crop failures.
- - The first newspaper in the Swedish province of Finland, Tidningar utgifne af et Sällskap i Åbo.
- - Sweden and France creates an alliance.
- - Foundation of the Royal College of Music, Stockholm.
- - Foundation of the Royal Swedish Society of Naval Sciences.
- - The notorious thief Jacob Guntlack is executed in the capital in front of thousands of spectators.

== Births ==
- 23 January – Elisabeth Forsselius, actress (died 1850)
- Cajsa Wahllund, restaurateur (died 1843)
- Margareta Sofia Lagerqvist, actress and singer (died 1800)
- Marie Antoinette Petersén, musician (died 1855)
- Charlotta Roos, fortune teller and medium (died 1809)
- Anna Leonore König, singer (died 1854)
- Ulrika Åberg, ballerina (died 1852)

== Deaths ==
- Niclas Gustaf Duncan, spy (born 1711)
- - Jacob Guntlack, notorious thief (born 1744)
- - Brigitta Sahlgren, industrialist (born 1694)
