= 1706 in Sweden =

- Years in Sweden: 1703 1704 1705 1706 1707 1708 1709
- Centuries: 17th century · 18th century · 19th century
- Decades: 1670s 1680s 1690s 1700s 1710s 1720s 1730s
- Years: 1703 1704 1705 1706 1707 1708 1709

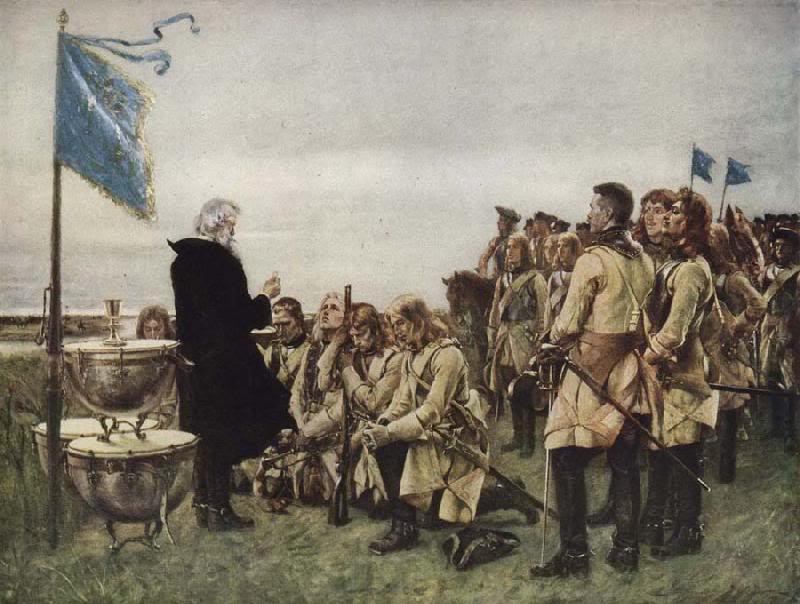
Thanksgiving after the victory of Fraustadt – Gustaf Cederström

Events from the year 1706 in Sweden

== Incumbents ==
- Monarch – Charles XII

== Events ==
- 2 February - Swedish victory in the Battle of Fraustadt.
- October 29 - Swedish defeat in the Battle of Kalisz.
- 31 October - Peace with Saxony in the Treaty of Altranstädt (1706).
- The La troupe du Roi de Suede leaves Sweden and the theater of Bollhuset remains closed for fifteen years.

== Births ==
- March 12 - Johan Pasch, painter (died 1769)
- May 22 - Samuel Troilius, archbishop (died 1764)

== Deaths ==
- Maria Daelder, banker and businessperson
