= 1701 in Sweden =

- Decades: 1680s; 1690s; 1700s; 1710s; 1720s
- See also: Other events of 1701; Timeline of Swedish history

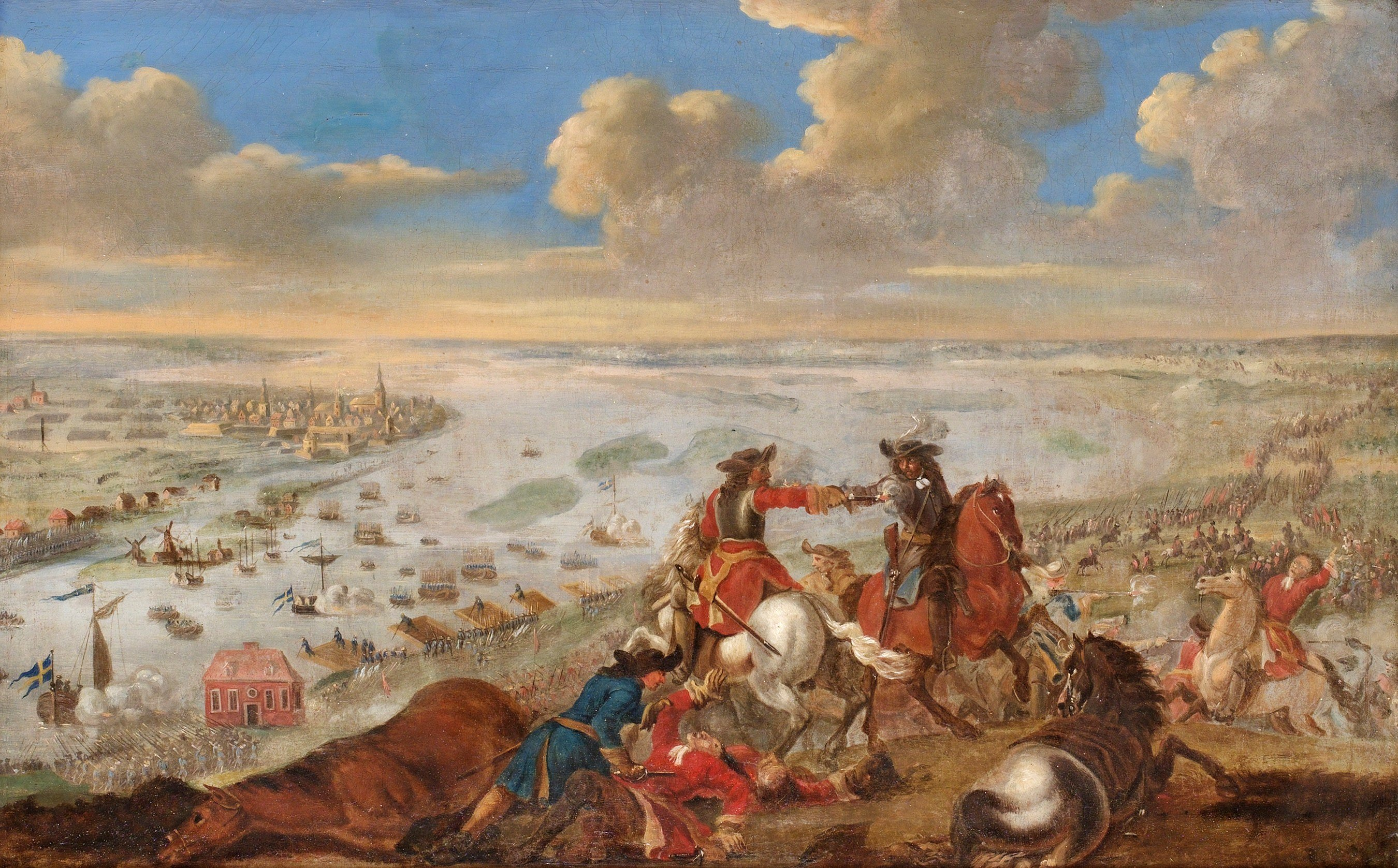
Charles XII is crossing the Düna, 1701

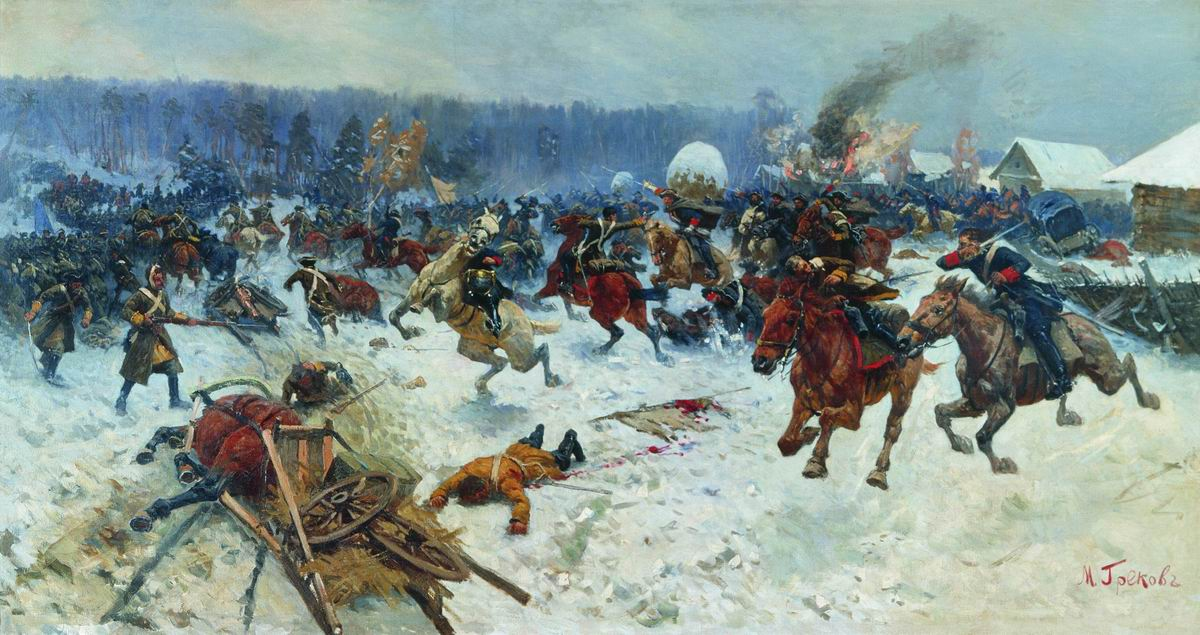

Events from the year 1701 in Sweden

== Incumbents ==
- Monarch – Charles XII

== Events ==
- July 9 – Crossing of the Düna: Following his victories over Denmark and Russia in 1700, Charles XII of Sweden escalates the conflict in the Great Northern War by an invasion of Poland. The Swedes defeat the army of Saxony (then a Polish territory) at the River Dvina.
- - Battle of Petschora
- - Battle of Rauge
- - Battle of Erastfer
- - Sätra brunn is established.
- - A new sumptuary law restrict the import of valuable textiles for clothing and the burgher class from using the dress of the nobility. This leads to harassment when burgher class women in the capital dressed as noblewomen had their skirts torn off; the disturbances made the monarch prolong the enforcement of the law for a year, until those concerned had the time to replace their wardrobes.
- - Campus Elysii by Olof Rudbeck.

== Births ==
- 1 February - Johan Agrell, compose (died 1765)
- 18 March - Niclas Sahlgren, merchant and philanthropist (died 1776)
- 27 November - Anders Celsius, astronomer (died 1744)
- 16 December - Olof Arenius, portrait painter (died 1766)

== Deaths ==
- 8 January - Per Stålhammar, officer (born 1612)
- 27 February - Christiana Oxenstierna, countess notorious for a mesalliance (born 1661)
- 27 April - Adolph John II, Count Palatine of Kleeburg (born 1666)
