= 1612 in Sweden =

Events from the year 1612 in Sweden

== Incumbents ==
- Monarch – Gustaf II Adolf

== Events ==
- 6 January – Axel Oxenstierna becomes the Lord High Chancellor of the Privy Council.
- 10–11 February – Battle of Vittsjö.
- 21 February – Battle of Kölleryd.
- 26 February – Massacre in Nya Lödöse, 300 Norwegian soldiers are massacred inside a church in Nya Lödöse.

== Births ==
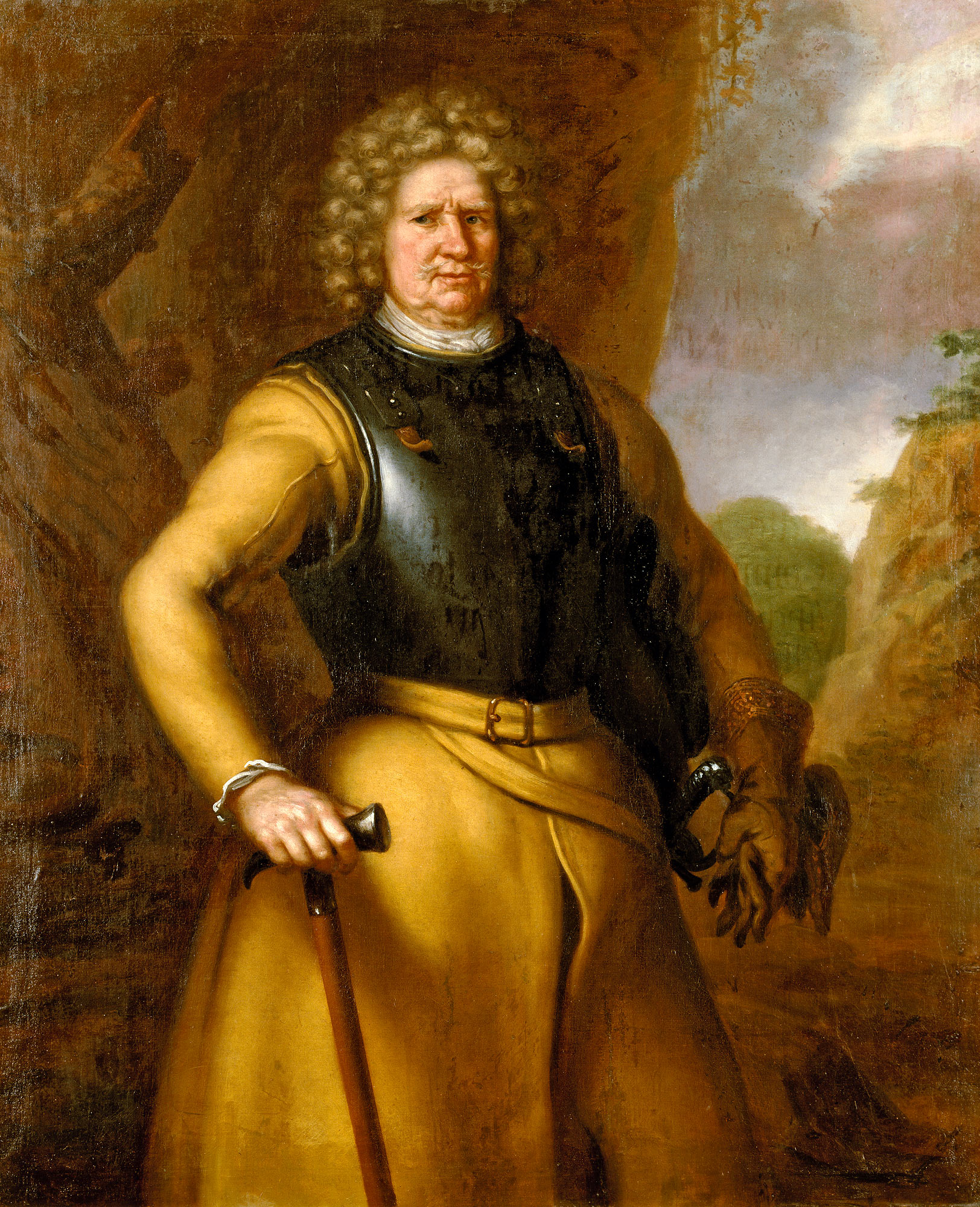
Per Stålhammar in 1692

- Approximate date – Per Stålhammar, officer (died 1701)

== Deaths ==
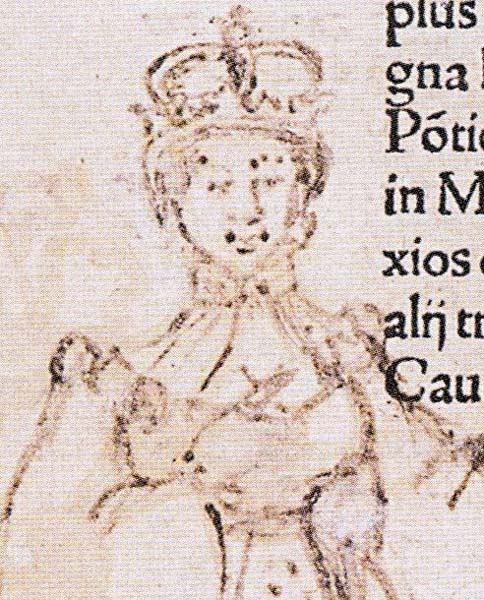
Karin Månsdotter

- 13 September – Karin Månsdotter, royal mistress and queen (born 1550)
