= 1766 in Sweden =

- Years in Sweden: 1763 1764 1765 1766 1767 1768 1769
- Centuries: 17th century · 18th century · 19th century
- Decades: 1730s 1740s 1750s 1760s 1770s 1780s 1790s
- Years: 1763 1764 1765 1766 1767 1768 1769

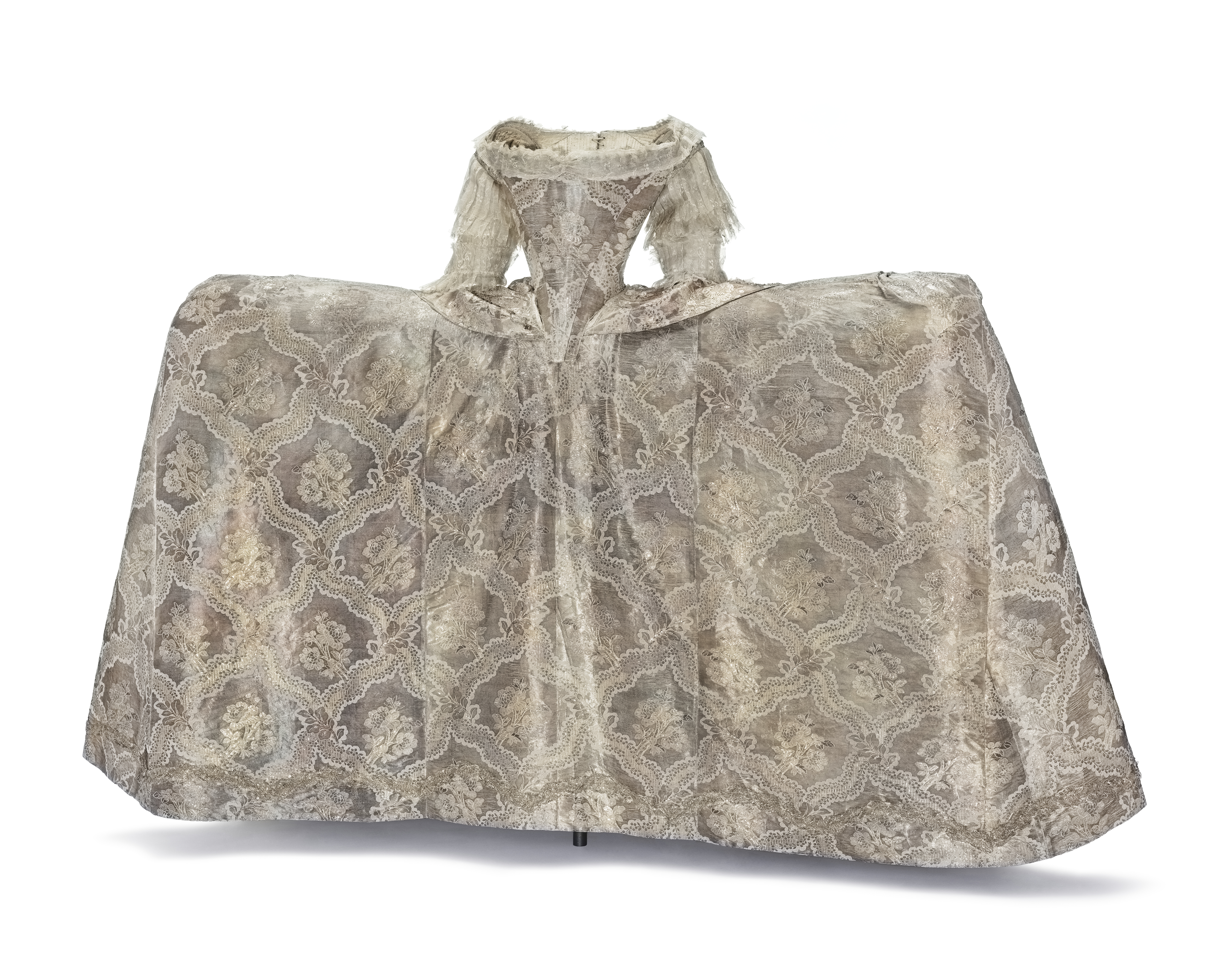
The wedding dress of Sophia Magdalena, Livrustkammaren.

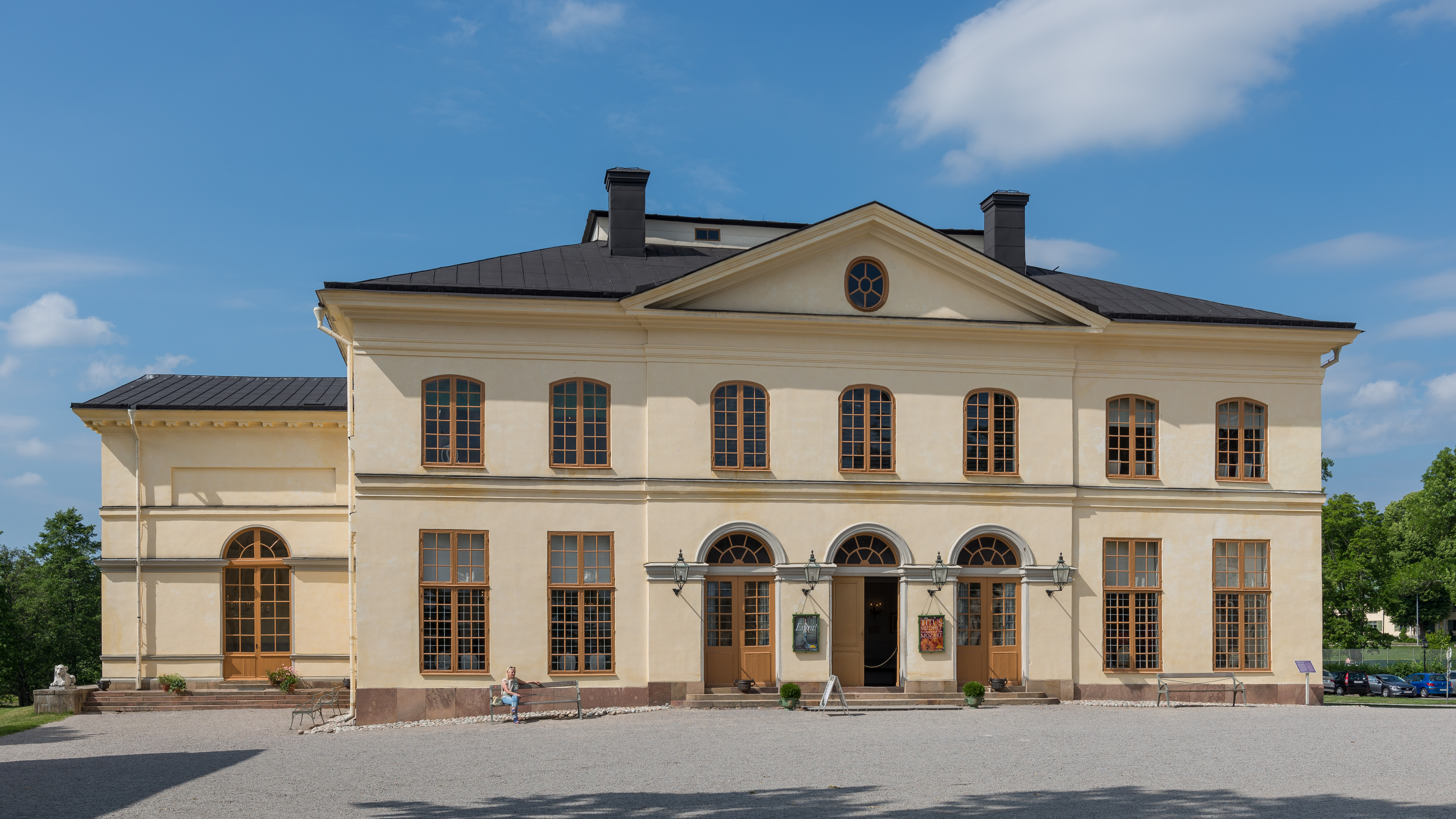
Drottningholm Palace Theatre, exterior view, 2013

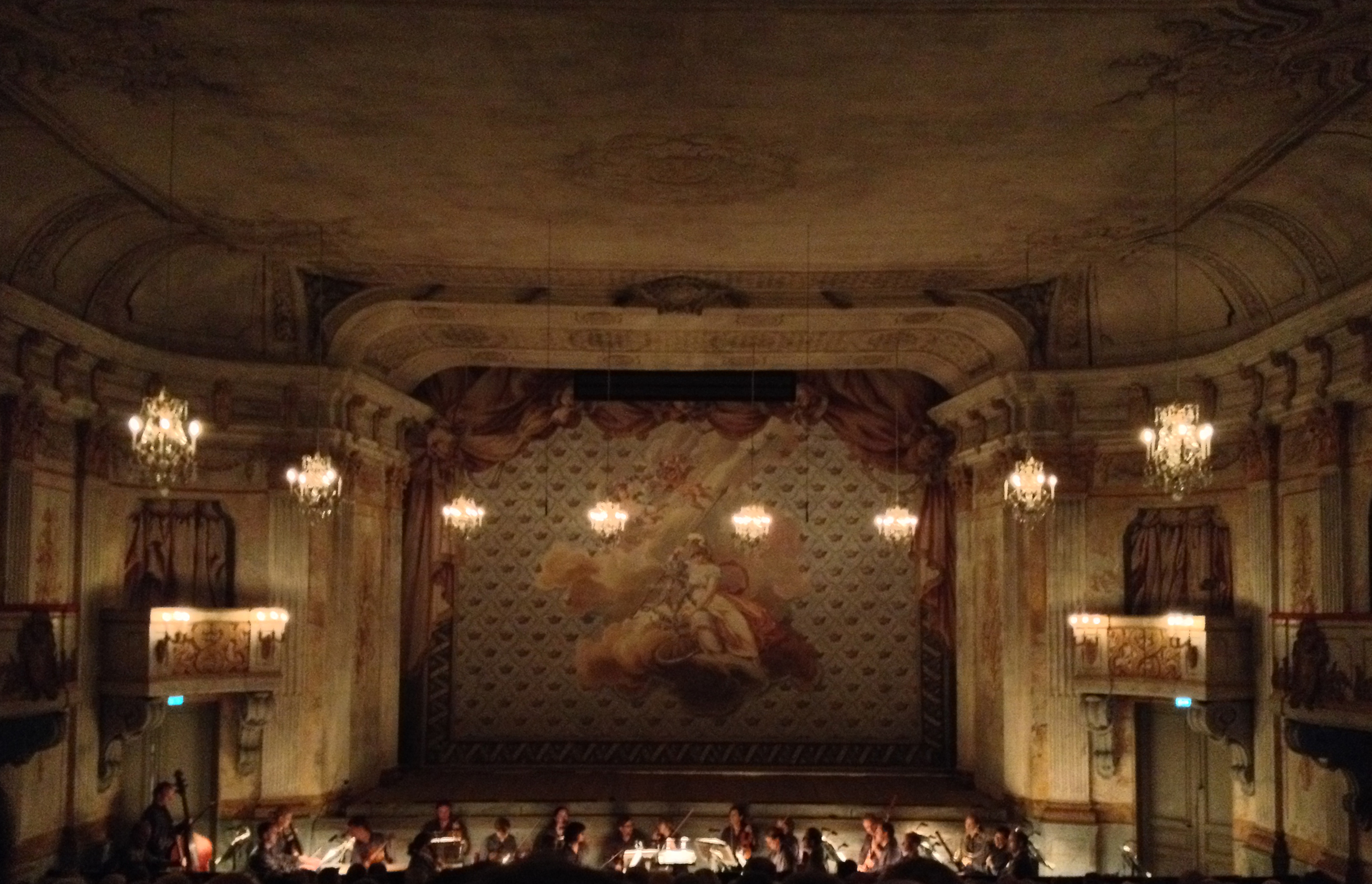
Drottningholms slottsteater, interior view

Events from the year 1766 in Sweden

== Incumbents ==
- Monarch – Adolf Frederick

== Events ==
- February – The government of the Caps (party) make an alliance between Sweden and Great Britain, and France discontinue its subsidies to Sweden.
- 30 April – Uppsala burns down.
- 26 June – The new Sumptuary law bans the import of numerous luxury items such as coffee, chocolate and many brands of vine.
- 9 July - Inauguration of the new Drottningholm Palace Theatre.
- 8 October - Sophia Magdalena of Denmark arrives in Sweden.
- 4 November – The wedding between Crown Prince Gustav and Sophia Magdalena of Denmark in Stockholm.
- 2 December – The law of the Freedom of the press and the public access to public documents is passed.
- - The Utile Dulci is created.
- - A new sumptuary law is introduced, which is to be the strictest of all sumptuary laws in Sweden: all import of coffee, chocolate, Arak (drink), Punsch, Liqueur, perfume and certain brands of vine are banned, the use of tobacco for any one below the age of 21, as well as trains and silk laces for women: this is in effect until the accession of Gustav III in 1771, when all sumptuary laws are abolished.

== Births ==
- 1 January – Magdalena Rudenschöld, political conspirator ( 1823)
- 13 May – Carl von Rosenstein, archbishop (died 1836)
- 29 May – Baltzar von Platen, politician (died 1829)
- 23 December - Wilhelm Hisinger, physicist and chemist (died 1852)
- unknown - Lolotte Forssberg, illegitimate daughter of the monarch (died 1840)
- Charlotte Stierneld, courtier (died 1825)
- Helena Spinacuta, actor and acrobat (died 1846)

== Deaths ==
- 1 February - Jacob Pettersson Degenaar, pirate (born 1692)
- 5 May - Olof Arenius, painter (born 1701)
- Lorens Pasch the Elder, painter (born 1702)
- Hedvig Strömfelt, psalm writer (born 1723)
