= 1708 in Sweden =

- Years in Sweden: 1705 1706 1707 1708 1709 1710 1711
- Centuries: 17th century · 18th century · 19th century
- Decades: 1670s 1680s 1690s 1700s 1710s 1720s 1730s
- Years: 1705 1706 1707 1708 1709 1710 1711

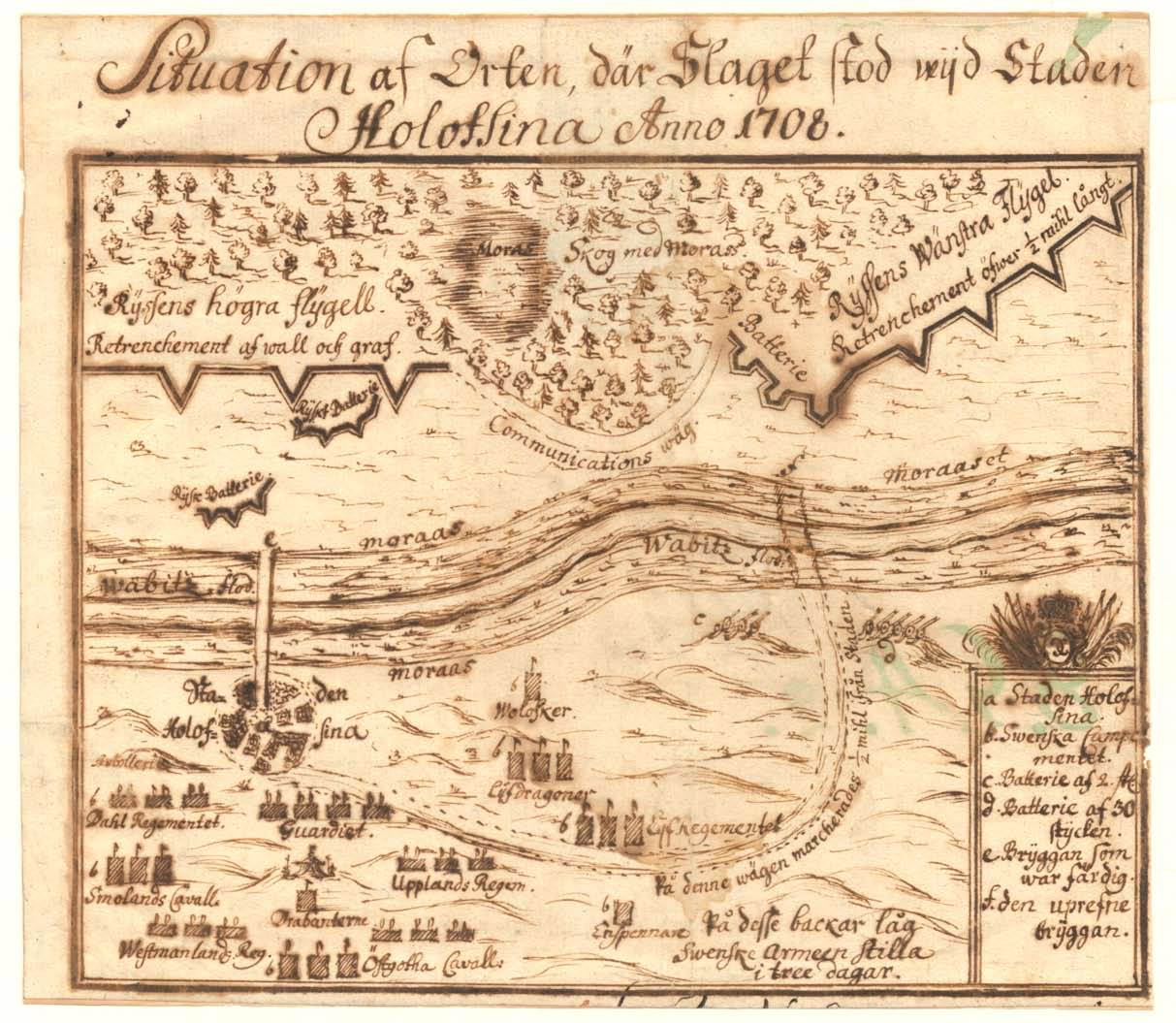
Swedish plan on the battle

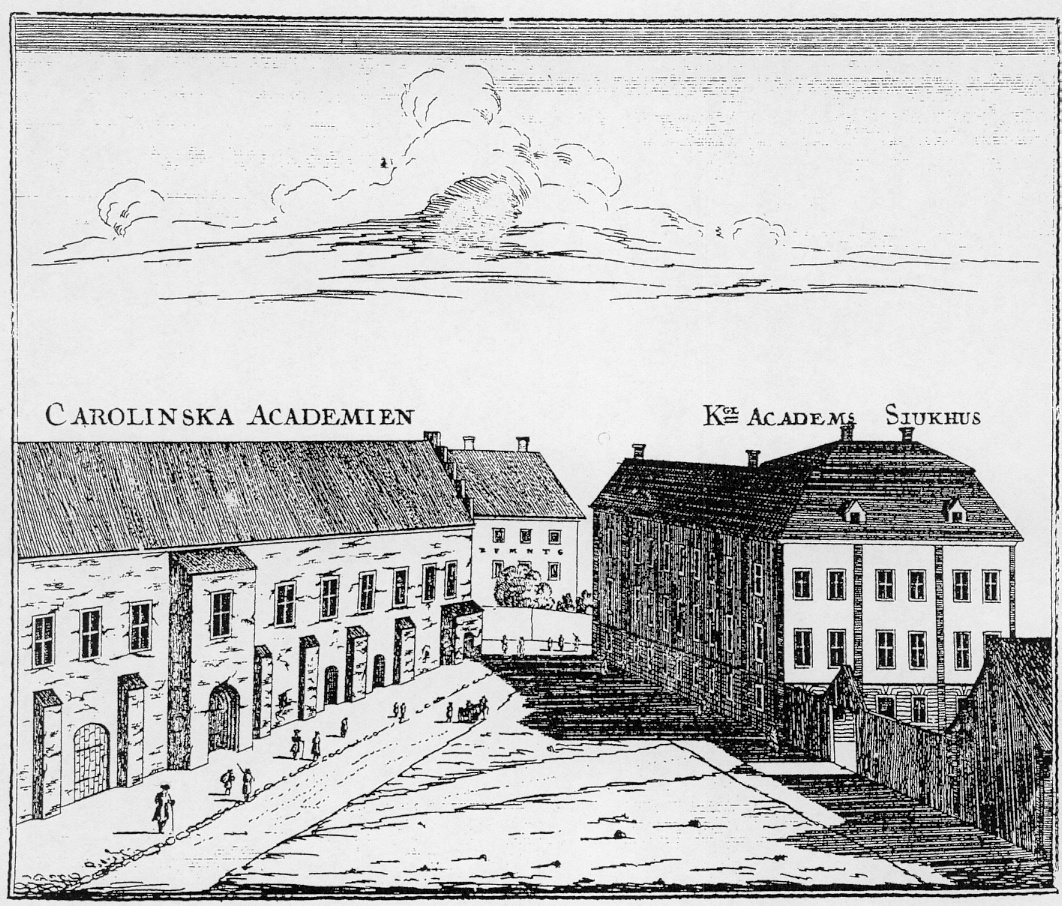
"Kgl. Academ[ien]s sjukhus", also known as the Nosocomium Academicum (in the Oxenstierna Palace), is seen to the right in this 1769 engraving by F. Akrelius. To the left the old chapter house, later used by the university and renamed Academia Carolina.

Events from the year 1708 in Sweden

== Incumbents ==
- Monarch – Charles XII

== Events ==
- 1 January - Sweden begins to invade Russia
- 4 July – Swedish victory over Russia at the Battle of Holowczyn.
- The Uppsala University Hospital is founded.

== Births ==
- 29 August – Olof von Dalin, poet (died 1763)
- - Sven Rosén (Pietist), Radical-Pietistic writer and leader (died 1751)

== Deaths ==
- – Görwel Gyllenstierna, female duelist (born 1646)
- – Johanna Eleonora De la Gardie, poet (born 1661)
- – Maria Jonae Palmgren, scholar, one of the first female college students (born 1630)
- 11 November – Hedvig Sophia of Sweden, princess (born 1681)
- – Anna Maria Clodt, courtier
