= 1711 in Sweden =

- Years in Sweden: 1708 1709 1710 1711 1712 1713 1714
- Centuries: 17th century · 18th century · 19th century
- Decades: 1680s 1690s 1700s 1710s 1720s 1730s 1740s
- Years: 1708 1709 1710 1711 1712 1713 1714

Events from the year 1711 in Sweden

== Incumbents ==
- Monarch – Charles XII

== Events ==
- Great Northern War plague outbreak
- The profession of midwifery is regulated and all future midwives are to be licensed by the Collegium Medicum after having been tutored by an already licensed midwife for a period of two years and passed the examination of a doctor before being allowed to practice their trade (until 1777, this applied only to the capital): the midwives are also banned from using instruments.

== Births ==
- 5 March – Carl Gustaf Pilo, painter (died 1793)
- 23 May - Ulla Tessin, courtier (died 1768)
- Niclas Gustaf Duncan, spy (died 1771)
- Françoise Marguerite Janiçon, writer (died 1789)
