= 1753 in Sweden =

- Years in Sweden: 1750 1751 1752 1753 1754 1755 1756
- Centuries: 17th century · 18th century · 19th century
- Decades: 1720s 1730s 1740s 1750s 1760s 1770s 1780s
- Years: 1750 1751 1752 1753 1754 1755 1756

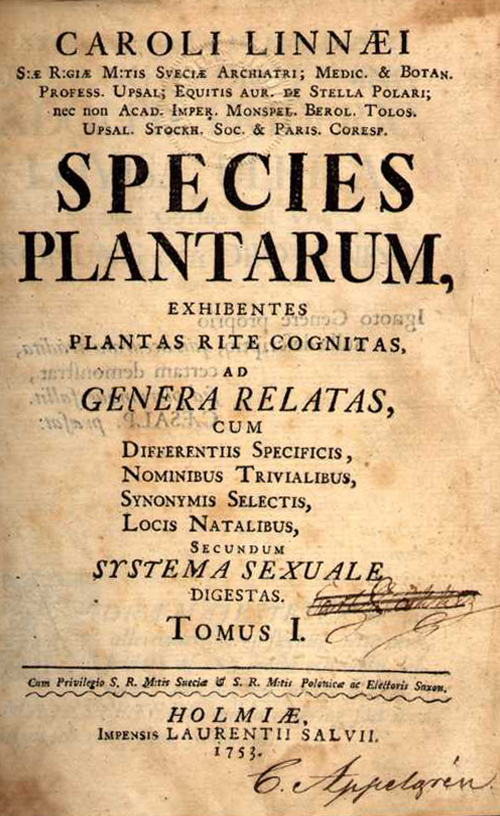
Species plantarum 001

Events from the year 1753 in Sweden

== Incumbents ==
- Monarch – Adolf Frederick

== Events ==
- 17 February – Sweden replace the Julian calendar with the Gregorian calendar.
- 1 May - Species Plantarum by Carl Linnaeus.
- 24 July - The Royal Swedish Academy of Letters, History and Antiquities is founded by Queen Louisa Ulrika.
- 20 September – Inauguration of the new observatory of the Royal Swedish Academy of Sciences.
- - Carl Linnaeus names the Cannabis sativa.
- - The new Royal Palace, Stockholm, is sufficiently ready for the royal family to move in, and they leave the Wrangel Palace for their new residence.
- - The Du Londel Troupe is established in Sweden.
- - The Kina slott is created and given to the queen as the birthday present.
- - A new school regulation is instituted in the capital, in which all the basic educational schools of the capital is to include the subjects writing, reading, mathematics, history, geography, essay-writing, nature science and drawing.
- - Creation of the Tankebyggarorden.

== Births ==
- 13 June – Johan Afzelius, chemist (died 1837)
- 2 July – Hedvig Eleonora von Fersen, courtier (died 1792)
- 16 September – Märta Helena Reenstierna, diarist (died 1841)
- 8 October - Sophia Albertina, Abbess of Quedlinburg, princess (died 1829)
- - Jeanna von Lantingshausen, politically active countess (died 1809)

== Deaths ==
- 13 July – Sten Carl Bielke, official, scientist and member of the Swedish parliament (born 1709)
- - Hedvig Mörner, politically influential countess (born 1672)
- 26 October - Margareta von Ascheberg, landowner (born 1671)
