= 1776 in Sweden =

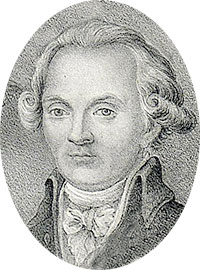
Nils Henric Liljensparre

Events from the year 1776 in Sweden

== Incumbents ==
- Monarch – Gustav III

== Events ==
- March - The restrictions of the Swedish Cereal trade is lifted.
- 2 May - The restrictions of the selling of Brännvin is lifted.
- 2 May - Le véritable et constante amitié, a female Lodge of Adoption under the regular Swedish Masonic order of the Freemasons, is inaugurated with Hedvig Elisabeth Charlotte of Holstein-Gottorp as Grand Mistress and Countesses Sophie and Hedvig Eleonora von Fersen, Countess Ulrica Catharina Koskull and, likely, Countess Charlotte Gyldenstolpe as members.
- - The monetary reform of Johan Liljencrantz stabilized the Swedish economy.
- - Carl Michael Bellman is appointed secretary of the royal court.
- - The police office is created, with Nils Henric Liljensparre appointed the first head of the Swedish police.
- 5 August - Romeo and Juliet is played for the first time in Sweden at Egges Theatre in Norrköping with Margareta Seuerling as Julia.
- 2 December - The Swedish Freedom of Print.

== Births ==
- 16 August - Amalia von Helvig, poet (died 1831)
- 21 September - Karl Gustav Bonuvier, theater director (died 1858 )
- 15 November – Pehr Henrik Ling, pioneered the teaching of physical education (died 1839)
- 29 December - Gustaf af Wetterstedt, prime minister (died 1837)
- - Gustava Johanna Stenborg, artist (died 1819)
- - Charlotta Arfwedson, politically active countess and artist (died 1862)
- - Pär Aron Borg, Swedish pedagogue and a pioneer in the education for the blind and deaf (died 1839)

== Deaths ==
- 10 March - Niclas Sahlgren, merchant and philanthropist (born 1701)
