= 1692 in Sweden =

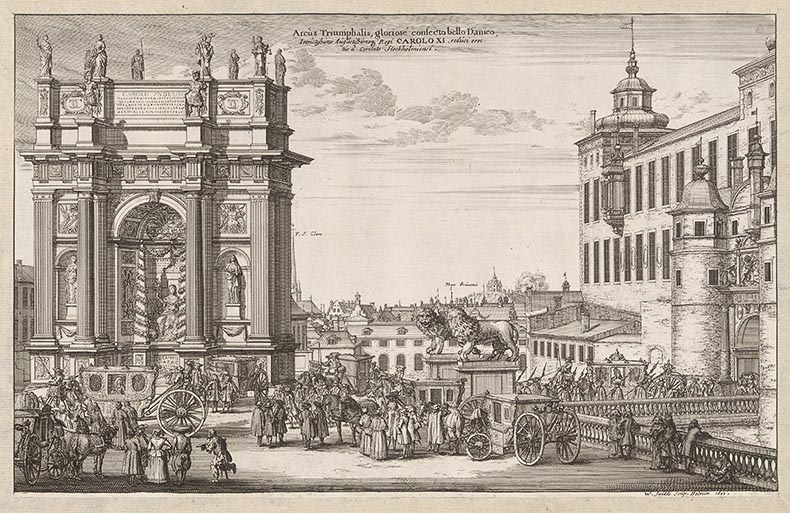
Suecia

Events from the year 1692 in Sweden

== Incumbents ==
- Monarch – Charles XI

== Events ==
- The exiled mystic Eva Margareta Frölich return to Stockholm to preach.
- Livonian nobleman Johann Patkul protests to the king about the reduction of land to the Crown, then flees to escape arrest, and is later condemned to death.

== Births ==
- 13 January - Gunnila Grubb, hymn writer (died 1729)
- 11 September - Ingela Gathenhielm, privateer in service of King Charles XII of Sweden during the Great Northern War.
- Jacob Pettersson Degenaar, pirate (died 1766)

== Deaths ==
- 17 May - Countess Palatine Eleonora Catherine of Zweibrücken, cousin and foster sister of Queen Christina of Sweden and sister of King Charles X Gustav of Sweden
- September - Eva Margareta Frölich, mystic, prophet, visionary and Pietistic writer
