= 1624 in Sweden =

Events that occurred during the year 1624 in Sweden, including births and deaths.

== Incumbents ==
- Monarch – Gustaf II Adolf

== Events ==
=== April ===
- April 15: The city of Sala is granted town privileges by Gustaf II Adolf.

=== June ===
- 1 June: The truce between Sweden and Poland expires, but is extended until March 1, 1625.

=== September ===
- September 11: The royal secretary Göran Bähr is hung for his apostasy of the Protestant religion.
- September 21: Södertälje 's mayor Z. Anthelius, and two other Swedes are executed because of their Catholic faith.

== Births ==
- February 13: Erik Oxenstierna (not to be confounded with Eric Oxenstierna), born in Södermanland, count of Södermöre and Swedish chancellor.
- 29 June - Olov Svebilius, archbishop from 1681 to his death in 1700.
- unknown date - Anna Eriksdotter, alleged witch (died 1704).
- Maria Dauerer, pharmacist (apothecary) (died 1688).

== Deaths ==
- March 25: Lucretia Magnusdotter (Gyllenhielm), illegitimate royal daughter (died 1562).
