= Jesper Mattson Cruus af Edeby =

Swedish soldier and politician (1576–1622)

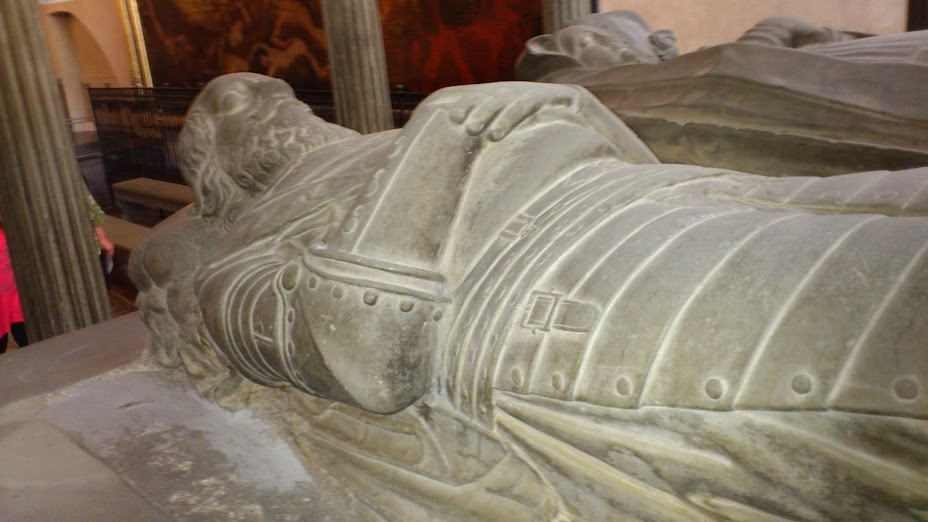
Jesper Mattson Cruus

Jesper Mattson Cruus af Edeby (1576–1622) was a Swedish soldier and politician, being appointed Privy Councilor in 1612, Field Marshal in 1615, Lord High Treasurer in 1615, and Governor of Riga in 1621. In the Kalmar War (1611–1613) he led the Swedish troops to victory against the Danish forces, led by King Christian IV of Denmark, at the Battle of Kölleryd, on 21 February 1612. In 1622 he died in Riga after being wounded in a dispute with a local clergyman.
