= 1562 in Sweden =

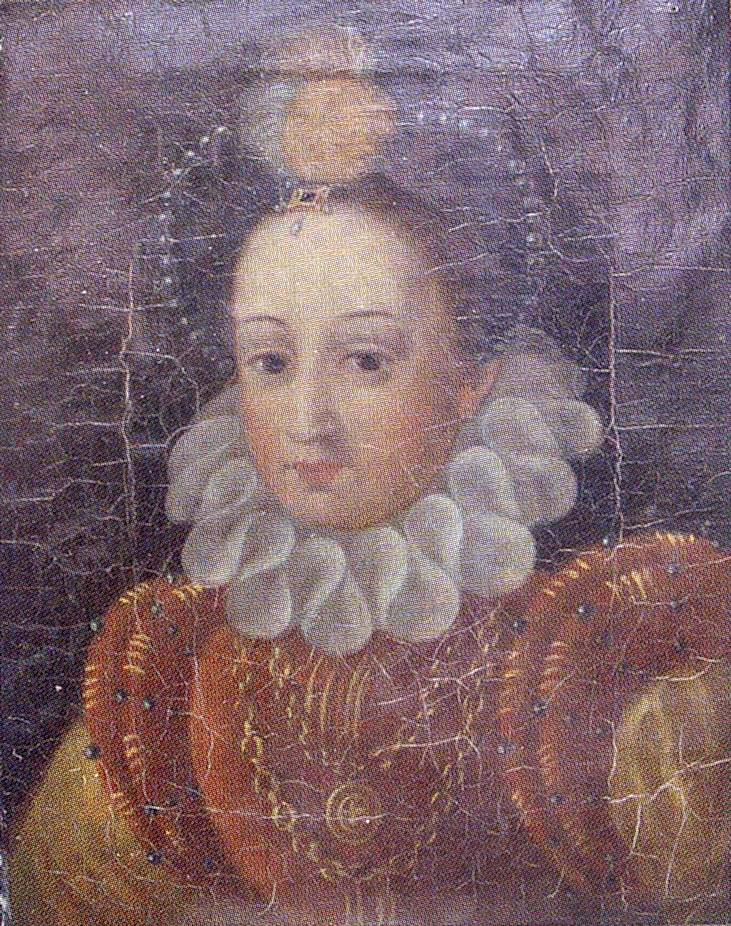
Gyllenhielm as painted by Crommeny in the 1590s

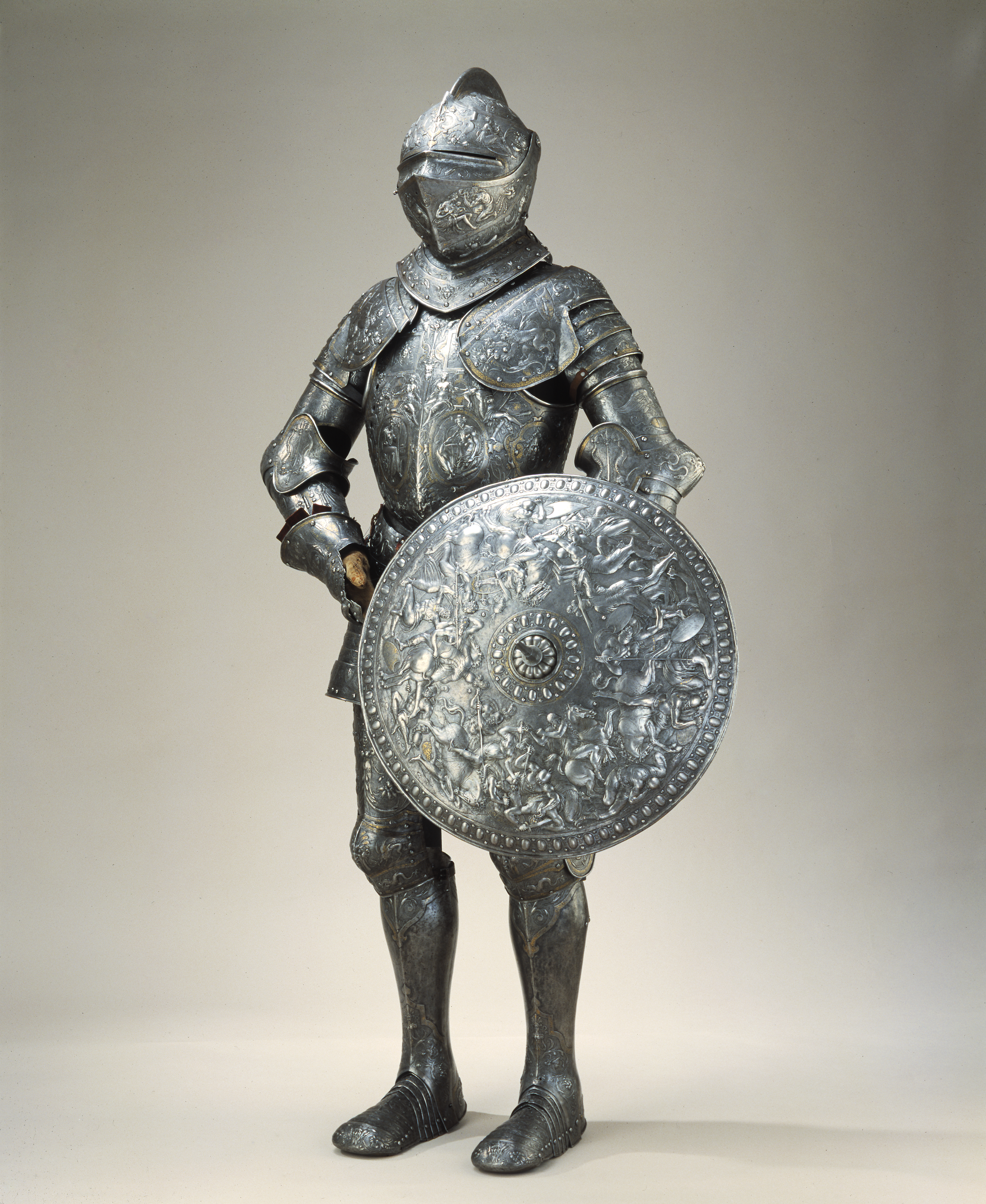

Events from the year 1562 in Sweden

== Incumbents ==
- Monarch – Eric XIV

== Events ==
- 2 June - Swedish troops conquer Pärnu.
- 4 October - The wedding between Prince John and Catherine Jagiellon causes a conflict between the king and his brother, due to a bet on which brother would marry her, based on the belief that she was homely.
- Summer - Swedish troops conquer Paide.
  - Swedish troops conquer Karkus, Estonia.
  - At the request of the citizens of Reval, Eric XIV bans all trade with Narva.

== Births ==
- Lucretia Magnusdotter (Gyllenhielm), royal daughter (born 1562, died 1624)
