= Stålhammar =

Swedish noble family

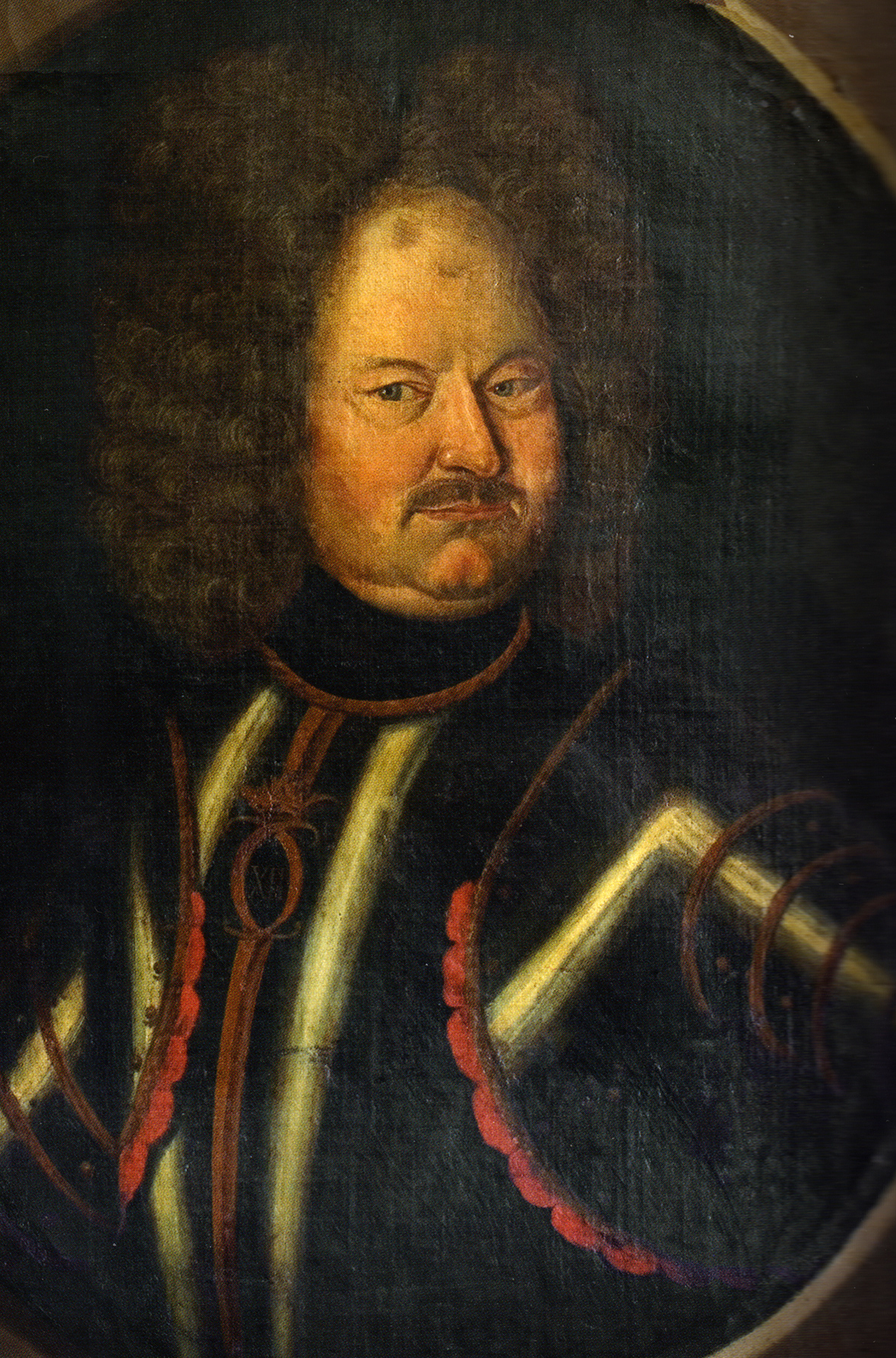
Portrait of Lieutenant Colonel Jon Stålhammar

The Stålhammar family is a Swedish noble family with roots in the province of Småland. Its founding member was Per Stålhammar (ca. 1610–1701, born Per Jönsson Hammar), who was knighted in 1650 after a long and distinguished military career under Charles X and Charles XI as a soldier and officer. His service included actions in the Thirty Years' War in Poland, one of the several wars between Denmark and Sweden in the 17th century and the Scanian War.

Prominent members include:

- Lieutenant Colonel Jon Stålhammar
- Ulrika Eleonora Stålhammar, soldier in the artillery and servant at the royal court
- Sofia Stålhammar, artist

Jonas Stålhammar (musiker)

Steel hammers from Småland - a noble family Steel Hammer No. 496 Grandfather Per Stålhammar knighted in 1650 Sweden Sweden's Knights House introduced in 1650 Grade noble family No. 496 Finland The Knights House of Finland introduced in 1818 Dignity noble family: 39 † Extinction in Finland extinct in 1850 Stålhammar is a Småland nobility, whose first member Colonel Per Stålhammar (formerly Per Jönsson Hammar) (born in the 1610s, died January 8, 1701) was adopted on August 30, 1650. The family received number 476 (later changed to 496).

Pedigree in selection (known members)

- Per Stålhammar (1612–1701), Colonel
- Johan Stålhammar (1653–1711), Lieutenant Colonel
- Ulrika Eleonora Stålhammar (1683–1733), artillerist and palletist under the name Vilhelm Edstedt
- Carl Stålhammar (1655–1702), rider master
- Casper Adolf Stålhammar (1695–1771), captain
- Anders Stålhammar (1728–1803, rider master)
- Anders Stålhammar (1769–1841), lieutenant
- Adolf Stålhammar (1824–1907), Lieutenant Colonel
- Gustav Adolf Stålhammar (1869–1938), missionary
- Daniel Stålhammar (1901–1978), physician and dentist [1]
- Daniel Stålhammar (1940–2012), physician (neurosurgeon) and associate professor
- Fredrik Stålhammar (1737–1817), a life-saver
- Henrik Stålhammar (1789–1866), lieutenant captain
- Hjalte Stålhammar (1835–1912), major
- Harry Stålhammar (1878–1953), veterinarian [2]
- Jon Stålhammar (1659–1708), Lieutenant Colonel
- Otto Fredrik Stålhammar (1695–1753), captain
- Jon Stålhammar (1723–1782), Lieutenant Colonel
- Jon Stålhammar (1769–1838), Colonel
- Jon Stålhammar (1811–1907), politician
- Jonas Stålhammar (born 1973), musician
