= 1623 in Sweden =

Events from the year 1623 in Sweden

== Incumbents ==
- Monarch – Gustaf II Adolf

== Events ==
- Åbo (Turku) hovrätt is created as the court of appeal in the Swedish province of Finland.
- Johannes Rudbeck founds Rudbeckianska Gymnasiet, the first gymnasium in Sweden.
- Sweden places a blockade on Danzig in fear of it being used for a Polish attack on Sweden.
- Stockholm is tormented by the plague.
- The city street trade outside the guilds, Månglare, is regulated by permit which are only to be issued to people in need of support and by regulations set to protect the monopoly of the guilds.

== Births ==
- 16 July – Bengt Gabrielsson Oxenstierna, diplomat (died 1702)
