= 1630 in Sweden =

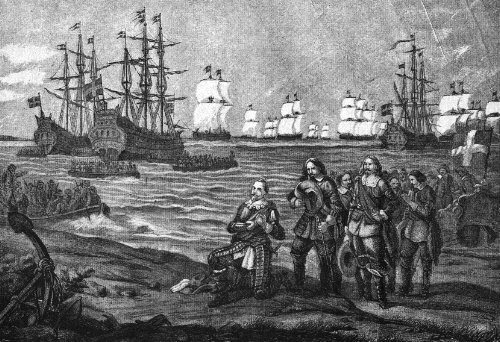
Gustaf II Adolf's landing in Pomerania

Events from the year 1630 in Sweden

== Incumbents ==
- Monarch – Gustaf II Adolf

== Events ==
- June 6 – Swedish warships depart from Stockholm for Germany.
- July 6 – Swedish intervention in the Thirty Years' War begins when King Gustav Adolf of Sweden, leading an army of 13,000 on the protestant side, makes landfall at Peenemünde, Pomerania.
- July 9 – Thirty Years' War: Stettin is taken by Swedish forces.
- September 4 – Thirty Years' War: the Treaty of Stettin is signed by Sweden and the Duchy of Pomerania, forming a close alliance between them, as well as giving Sweden full military control over Pomerania.

== Births ==
- 12 December – Olaus Rudbeck, physicist and anatomist (died 1702)
- Maria Jonae Palmgren, scholar, one of the first female college students (died 1708)

== Deaths ==
- Margareta Hybertsson, shipbuilder
