= 1550 in Sweden =

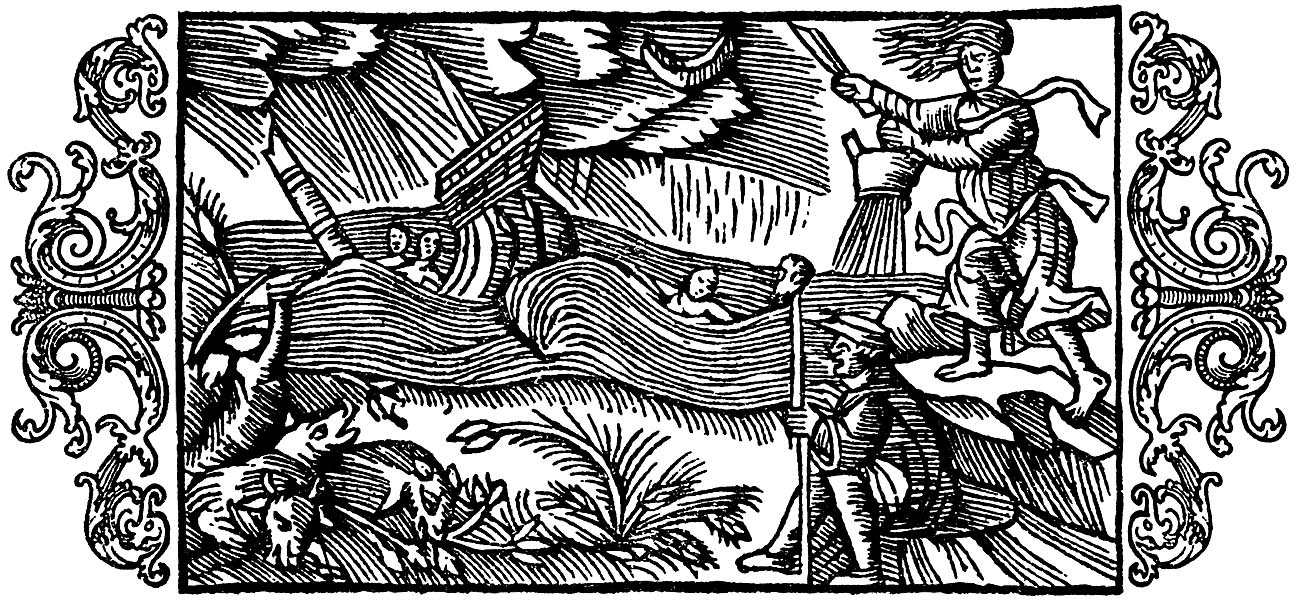
Olaus Magnus - On Women Skilled in Magic

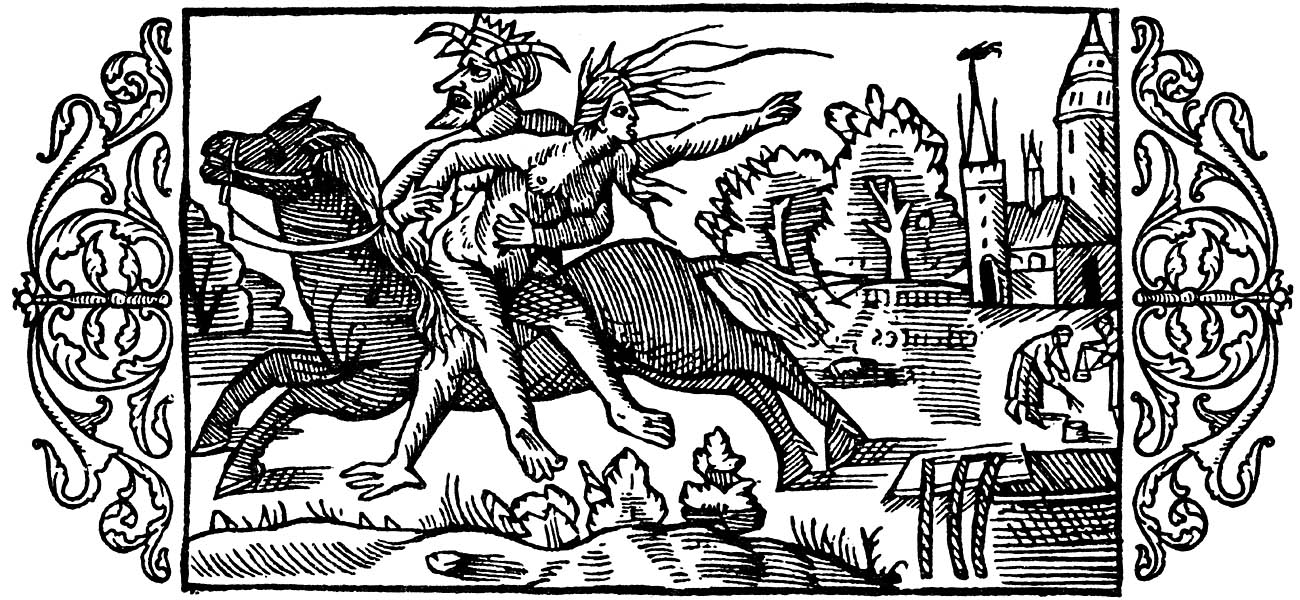
Olaus Magnus - On the Punishment of Witches

Events from the year 1550 in Sweden

== Incumbents ==
- King – Gustav I

== Events ==
- 12 June - King Gustav Vasa founds Helsingfors, now the Helsinki, the capital of Finland.
- The witch trial against Lasses Birgitta, referred to as the first execution for witchcraft in Sweden.
- King Gustav Vasa placed Sapmi under royal administration, which led to an increase in royal revenue by starting royal taxes on fur, fish and other products.

== Births ==
- 4 October - Charles IX of Sweden, king (1604–1611) of Sweden (died 1611). Otherwise known as "King Karl Vasa IX of Sweden".
- 6 November - Karin Månsdotter royal mistress and queen (died 1612).
- Date unknown - Nicolaus Olai Bothniensis, archbishop (died 1600).

== Deaths ==
- Unknown date - Lasses Birgitta, alleged witch
