= 1611 in Sweden =

Events from the year 1611 in Sweden

== Incumbents ==
- Monarch – Charles IX, then Gustaf II Adolf

== Events ==
- In January 1611, Prince Grigory Volkonsky defeated Delaville and regained control of Staraya Ladoga.
- The Kalmar War begins.
- March 2 – Kexholm is captured by Sweden.
- Spring – A fortification is built at Nyen to blockade Nöteborg.
- Early July – Jakob De la Gardie begins his siege on Novgorod.
- July 8 – The third False Dimitrij takes Pskov.
- July 12 – The Novgorod garrison makes a sortie against the Swedes, who get repulsed.
- July 16 – During the night, the Swedes pretend to attack Novgorod, diverting the garrisons attention from the gate where they intend to make a breakthrough. The city itself is captured but the Novgorod Kremlin holds out.
- July 17 – The Swedes capture the Novgorod Kremlin.
- July 25 – A treaty is signed between the Swedes and the Novgorod garrison.
- August – Evert Horn attempts to take Pskov.
- August 27 – The Novgorodians send a letter to Charles IX, placing themselves under his protection and asking to be ruled by one of his sons.
- September 12 – Ladoga falls, quickly followed by Tichvin and Staraja Russa.
- September 13 – Thanksgiving is celebrated in Sweden for the Capture of Novgorod.
- October 30 – Charles IX dies.
- December 25 – Novgorod grants full power to its embassy heading to Stockholm with the objective of bringing back a Swedish prince to rule Novgorod.

== Births ==
- 24 June - Johan Oxenstierna, statesman (died 1657)

== Deaths ==
- 30 October - Charles IX of Sweden, monarch (born 1550)
- - Elin i Horsnäs, alleged witch
- - Princess Sophia of Sweden, princess
