= 1671 in Sweden =

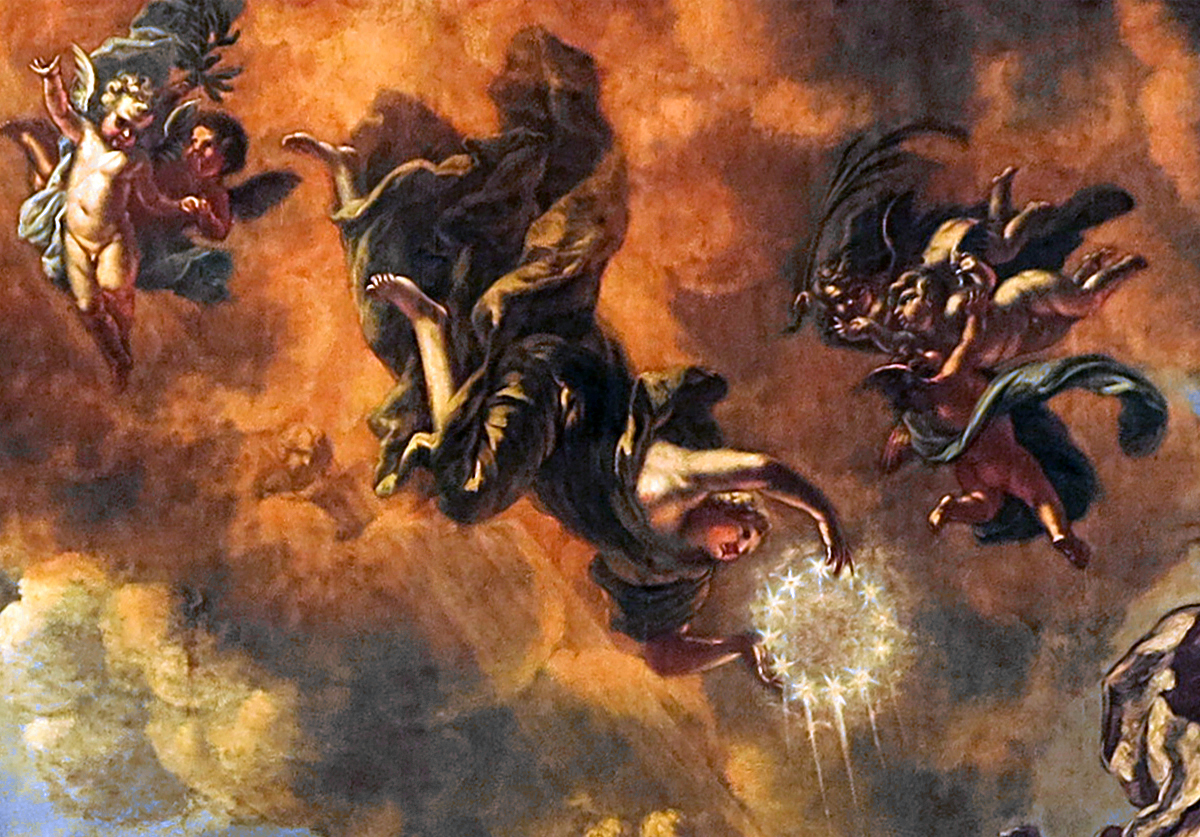
The Crown of Immortality, held by the Allegoric figure Eterna (Eternity) on the Swedish House of Knights Fresco by David Klöcker Ehrenstrahl

Events from the year 1671 in Sweden

== Incumbents ==
- Monarch – Charles XI

== Events ==
- The King grants the nobility Court leet.
- The Sami drums is forcibly collected and burned during the ongoing Christianization of the Sami people.

== Births ==
- Gustaf Adlerfelt, historical writer (died 1709)
- Johan Casper Printz, Swedish Navy officer (died 1746)
- 9 July - Margareta von Ascheberg, acting colonel and landowner (died 1753)

== Deaths ==
There is very little information on their death.

- Lars von der Linde (1640–1671) – A Swedish nobleman and military officer.
- Ture Gabriel Bielke (1624–1671) – A Swedish statesman and diplomat.
- Maria Sofia De la Gardie (1632–1671) – A Swedish noblewoman and the wife of the influential Magnus Gabriel De la Gardie.
