= Battle of Kölleryd =

Dano-Swedish battle

- Part of the Kalmar War
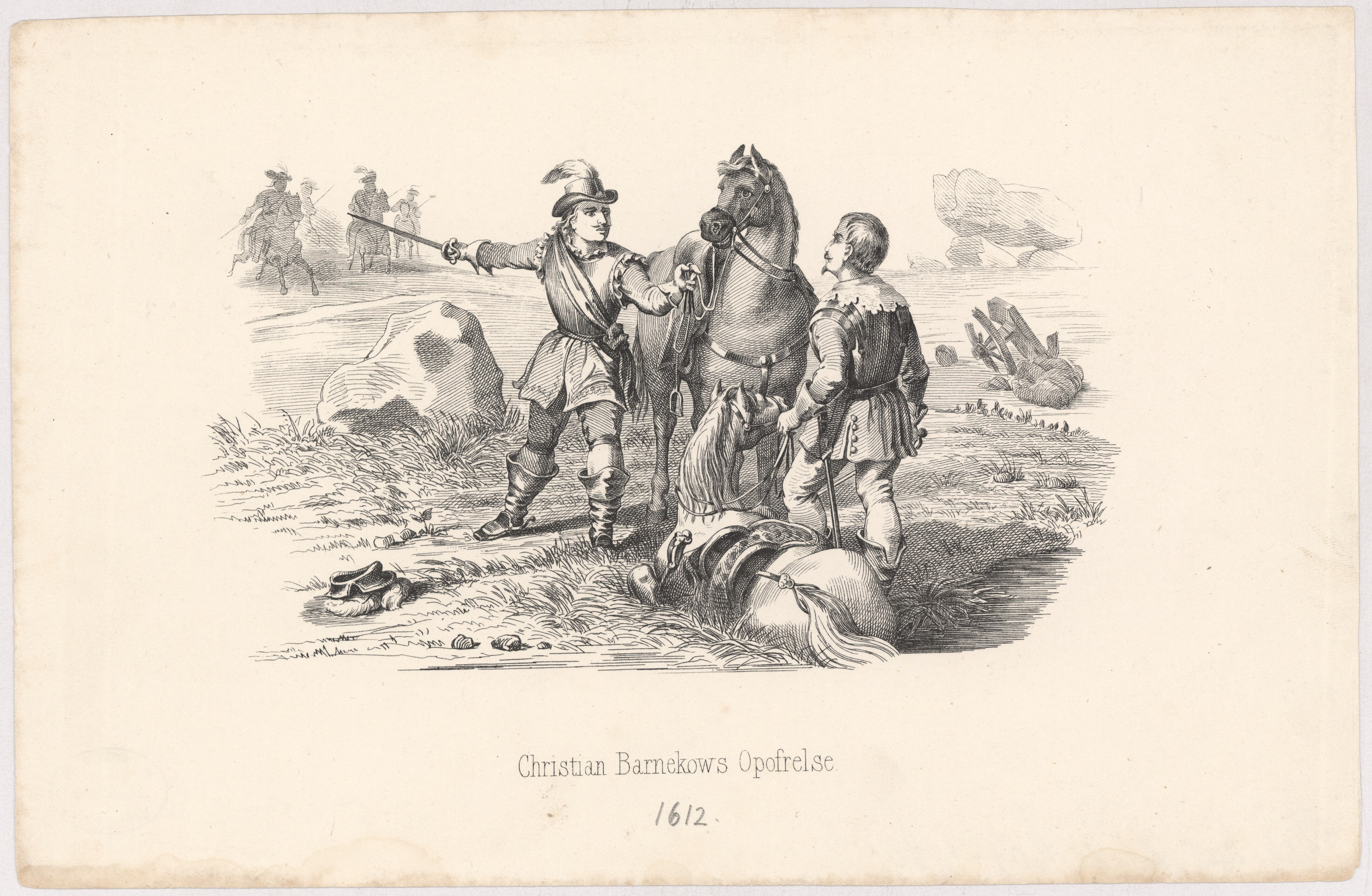
- Drawing of Christian Barnekow's sacrifice during the battle
Date	21 February 1612
Location	Skällinge parish, Halland
Result	Swedish victory
Territorial changes	Danes retreat to Varberg

Belligerents
(yes) Swedish Empire	Denmark–Norway

Commanders and leaders
(Swedish Empire) John of Östergötland (Swedish Empire) Jesper Mattson Cruus	(Denmark–Norway) Christian IV

Units involved
(Swedish Empire) 8 cavalry companies (Swedish Empire) 20 infantry companies	(Denmark–Norway) 7 cavalry companies

Strength
c. 2,000–4,000 men	c. 1,500–2,000 men

Casualties and losses
A few killed	130–400 casualties

The Battle of Kölleryd (Swedish: Slaget vid Kölleryd; Danish: Slaget ved Skillinge/Skillingehed) took place at Skällinge parish on 21 February 1612 during the Kalmar War. The Swedes were commanded by John of Östergötland and Jesper Mattson Cruus, while the Danes were commanded by King Christian IV. The battle ended in a Swedish victory.

== Background ==
When Christian IV led his army against Skara, Duke John of Östergötland and the Field Marshal Jesper Mattson Cruus were at Bogesund, further south. Together, they commanded a few banners of cavalry, several companies of Irish and Scottish infantry from Rutherford's regiment, and most likely some national infantry companies. While identifying the exact units under their command or their total manpower, their forces probably did not exceed 2,000 men. Other historians disagree, estimating their force at around 4,000 men.

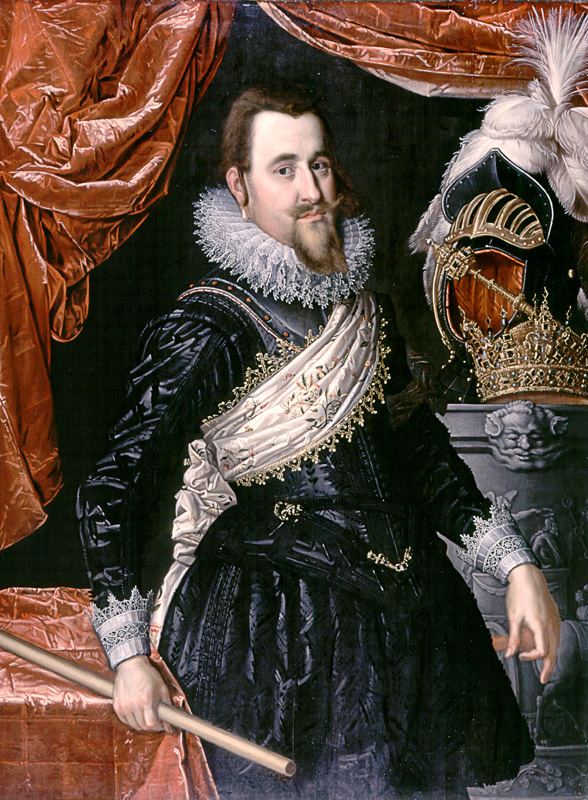
Portrait of Christian IV by Pieter Isaacsz c. 1612

In comparison, the Danish forces, commanded by Christian, consisted of some seven cavalry companies, around 1,500 or 2,000 men in total. His forces consisted of the Fyn, Aalborg, Aarhus, Halland, and Ribe banners, along with the likely harquebusier companies of Duke George of Brunswick–Lüneburg and Captain Benedict Bernd von Hagen.

At first, neither Duke John or Cruus knew that the Danish king was outnumbered. Instead, they feared that their numbers were too small to confront Christian, who they also believed was on his way towards Jönköping. As a result, they made no attempts to confront the Danes, instead focusing on defending and blocking the roads leading to Jönköping with abatis and other fortifications.

By 2 February, however, Duke John and Cruus had realized that the Danish offensive was only a plundering expedition and not an offensive against Jönköping, and the Swedes may have wanted to take advantage of the absence of the Danish king in order to carry out a raid of their own against Varberg. However, while they were on the march, they received reports of Christian IV's smaller numbers, and turned north-west to confront him. However, on 9 February, Christian began retreating west, and it is quite possible that he had decided to avoid Cruus and Duke John's army due to his smaller numbers.

=== Skirmish at Vånga ===
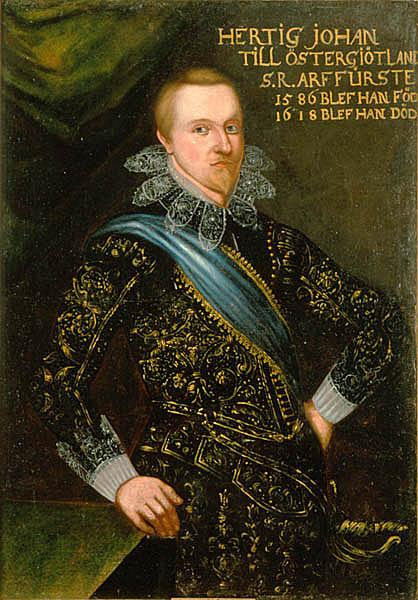
Portrait of Duke John by Holger Hansson from the 17th century

Meanwhile, he sent Claus Daa with the Aalborg Banner to do reconnaissance and raid the land to the Danish army's southern flank, probably to secure its retreat. At the village of Vånga, Daa encountered two Swedish cavalry banners, which were part of the vanguard of Duke John and Cruus' army, which was advancing from the south. After receiving support from the Halland banner, Daa managed to repulse the Swedish cavalry, holding the field of battle.

Despite the skirmish, Duke John and Cruus continued marching to intercept the Danish army. Several skirmishes broke out following this, between the Danish rearguard and the Swedish vanguard, and according to a Danish report, a Danish unit ended up behind the Swedish army, allowing it to plunder the Swedish supply train while it was still on the march. However, be that as it may, Christian continued avoiding battle by taking the precaution of crossing the Göta River into Norway on 12 February. Having failed to intercept the Danes, Cruus and Duke John henceforth marched on a parallel road as Christian continued south, shadowing the Danish army.

While Christian stayed in Norwegian Bohuslän, Duke John and Cruus managed to enter Danish Halland unopposed, and on 20 February, they captured and razed the unfortified Varberg town, but they did not attempt to capture Varberg castle, a modern fortress next to the town. Afterwards, Duke John and Cruus prepared to return to Sweden.

== Battle ==
However, by the time the Swedes were preparing to return to Sweden, Christian IV was already on his way south, riding with Duke George of Brunswick–Lüneburg and seven banners of cavalry. When Christian received news that the Swedes were at Mäshult, he force marched on 20 February to catch up to them. Accordingly, on 21 February, Duke John and Cruus deployed their men in a pass at Kölleryd. The Swedish musketeers deployed on the hell sides of the pass while the Swedish cavalry blocked the pass itself. When the Danes encountered the Swedes, Christian immediately ordered a cavalry charge, despite its exhaustion. The Swedish musket fire disrupted the charge and forced the Danes to flee in disorder, and the Swedish cavalry charged the Danes, engaging them in bloody man-to-man fighting. During this, the Swedish musketeers shot the Danes who came within their sights.

=== Legends ===
Several legends detail stories from the battle. According to one story that is generally dated to the eighteenth century, Christian's horse got stuck in a bog during the pursuit, and realizing that the Danish king was in danger of being captured by the Swedes, the 56 year old Christian Barnekow, who was also a scholar and diplomat, gave his horse to Christian, saying:

I give my horse to the king, my life to the enemy and my soul to God.

Barnekow then attempted to run alongside the horse by holding onto a stirrup but soon became so exhausted that he was forced to let it go. When he tried to catch his breath and possibly take cover behind a rock, he was killed by a Swedish soldier.

Another story of the battle describes the death of the 23-year-old noble Steen Rosensparre. Before the battle took place, another Dane warned him, saying: "Be careful, remember that you are the last of your line!" Rosensparre then replied: "You are right, that is a beautiful thought; an honourable name takes precedence over anything." Half an hour later, he had been killed.

== Aftermath ==
In total, Danish casualties were between 130 and 250 according to Danish estimates or 300 to 400, as claimed by Swedish estimates, although they are less likely to be true. Other historians have claimed that 200 Danes were killed. Swedish casualties amounted to a handful killed. Other notable Danish casualties includes Franciscus von Rantzau, who was the elder brother of Breide and Gert von Rantzau, along with several other leading nobles. After the battle, the surviving Danes took refuge in Varberg castle, and when the Swedes departed, Christian reorganized defenses in Halland and later travelled home to Copenhagen through Halmstad and Scania.

== Works cited ==
- Isacson, Claes-Göran (2006). Vägen till stormakt : Vasaättens krig [The road to great power: The wars of the Vasa dynasty] (in Swedish). Norstedts. ISBN 9789113015026.
- Essen, Michael Fredholm von (9 August 2023). The Kalmar War 1611-1613: Gustavus Adolphus's First War. Helion & Company. ISBN 9781804510063.
- Lindbergh, Katarina Harrison (7 June 2022). Kalmarkriget 1611–1613 [Kalmar War 1611–1613] (in Swedish). Historiska Media. ISBN 9789177898337.
