= 1768 in Sweden =

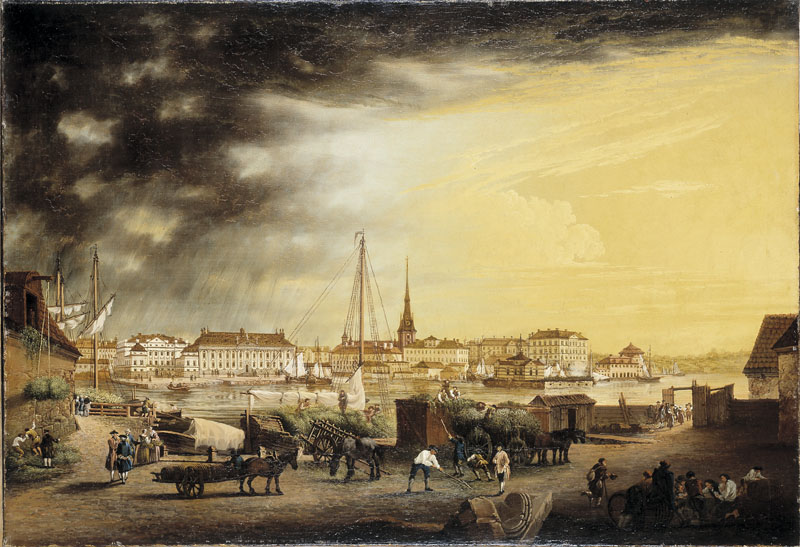
Rödbotorget 1768

Events from the year 1768 in Sweden

== Incumbents ==
- Monarch – Adolf Frederick

== Events ==
- 12 December – The King lays down the government, which creates the December Crisis (1768), that cause the parliament to call the Riksdag of the Estates.
- 18 December – The monarch resumes the government.
- - The ecstatic religious movement of Karin Olofsdotter begins.
- - Publishing of the book "Architecture Navalis Mercatoria" by Fredrik Henrik af Chapman.

== Births ==
- - Charlotta Malm-Reuterholm, painter (died 1845)

== Deaths ==
- 14 December - Ulla Tessin, courtier (born 1711)
