= Charlotta Malm-Reuterholm =

Finnish-Swedish artist (1768–1845)

- Lovisa Charlotta Malm, by Jonas Forsslund
- Born: Lovisa Charlotta Malm; 1768
- Died: 1845 (aged 76–77)
- Known for: Painting
- Spouse: Axel Christian Reuterholm (m. 1797)

Lovisa Charlotta Malm-Reuterholm (1768–1845) was a Finnish - Swedish artist, painter, writer and noble.

== Biography ==
She was the daughter of Major Jacob Georgsson Malm (1735–1789) and Eleonora Lovisa von Köhnnigstedt (1745–1821). She married Baron Axel Christian Reuterholm (1753–1811) in 1797. Her husband served as the president of The Court of Appeal in Vaasa (Vaasa Hovrätt). She is represented on the portrait collection of the Vaasa Court of Appeal.

She was a Dilettante painter. She also published a book of psalms in three parts in 1820–1846.

She was buried at Strängnäs Cathedral in the Diocese of Strängnäs, Sweden.

== Other sources ==
- Svenskt konstnärslexikon (Swedish art dictionary) Allhems Förlag, Malmö (In Swedish)
