= Jacob Guntlack =

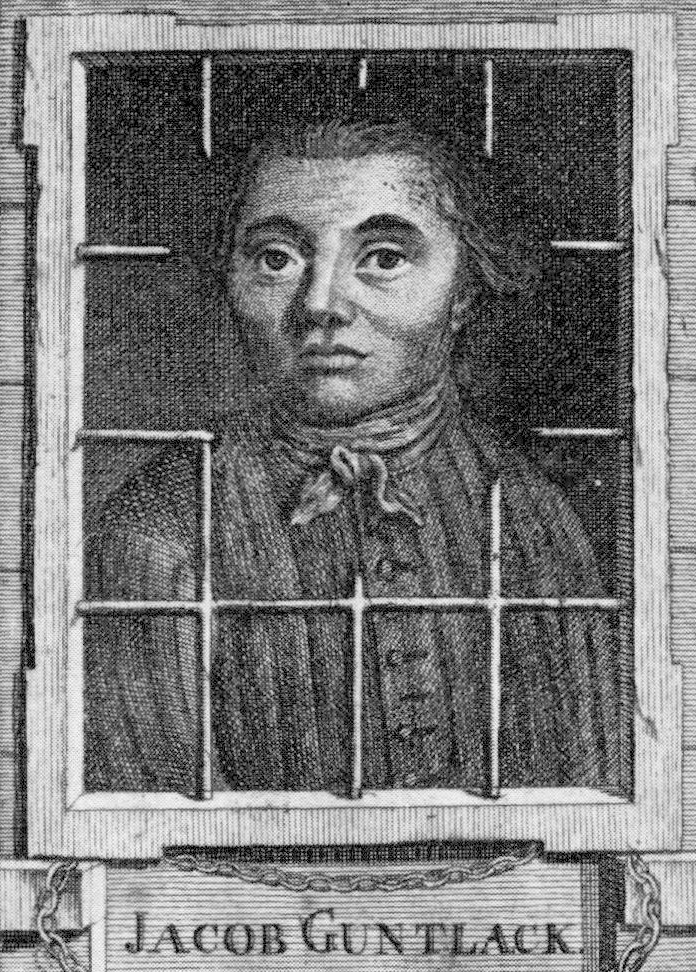
Jacob Guntlack

Jacob Guntlack (1744–1771) was a notorious Swedish thief and impostor. He began his thievery in Sweden and Finland at age fifteen; he was a famous criminal by the time he was executed in Stockholm in front of thousands of spectators. His memoirs, entitled Den uti Smedjegårds-häktet nu fängslade ryktbare bedragaren och tjufwen Jacob Guntlacks lefwernes-beskrifning, af honom sjelf författad, were published the same year, either written by himself in prison, or after interviews in prison.
