= Helena Lindelia =

Swedish artist (died 1710)

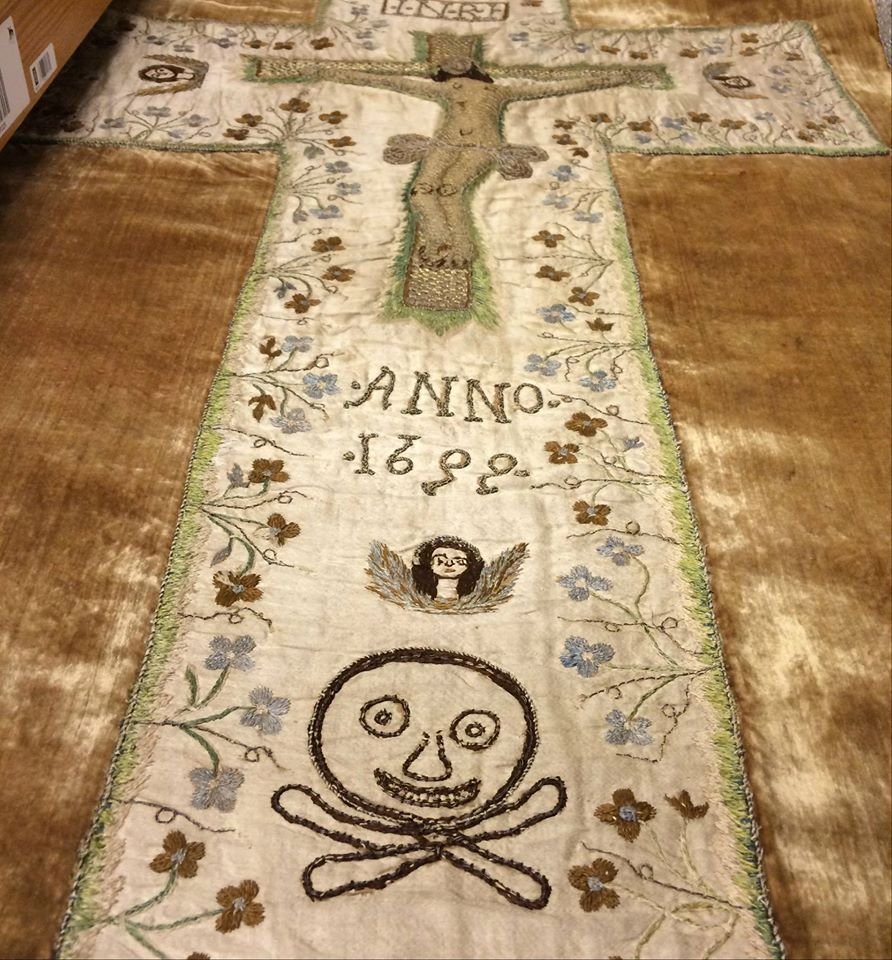
Art by Lindelia

Helena Lindelia (died 1710) was a Swedish textile artist.

== Life ==
She was the daughter and sister of a tailor, and active in Eksjö in Småland from 1682. After having become a widow, she supported herself by embroidering clerical textiles such as chasubles. Her work illustrates the religious beliefs of her contemporaries, but uses technique inspired from the Middle Ages. She is one of few professional woman textile artists known from Sweden in the 17th century.
