= Carl Wilhelm Cederhielm =

Swedish chamberlain (1705–1769)

Carl Wilhelm Cederhielm (1705–1769) was a Freiherr and Chamberlain (kammarherre) in Sweden. His father, Josias Cederhielm, was the royal adviser (riksråd), and his mother was Anna Åkerhielm.

Cederhielm is perhaps best known as a founding member of the Royal Swedish Academy of Sciences, which was founded in 1739.
