= 1661 in Sweden =

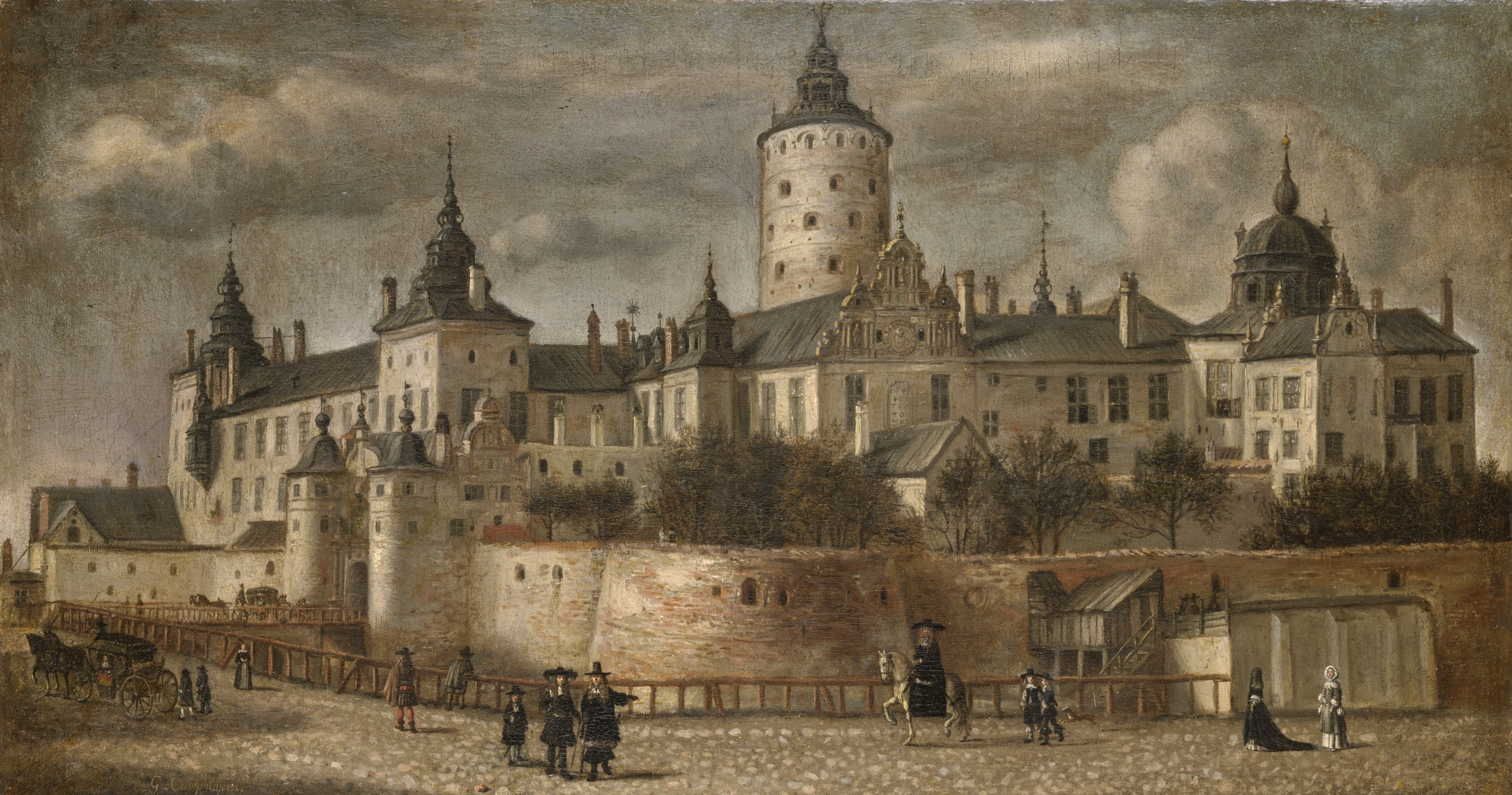
Tre Kronor Castle, seen from the southwest painted in 1661.

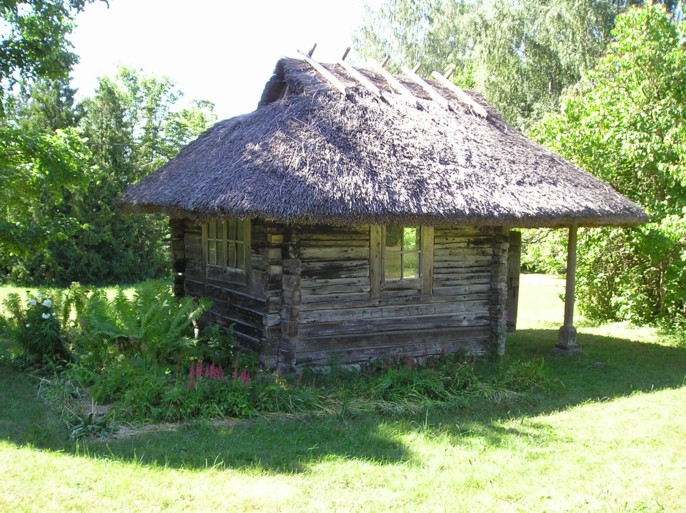
Small house near the Kärde Manor, where according to the folklore the Treaty of Cardis was signed.

Events from the year 1661 in Sweden

== Incumbents ==
- Monarch – Charles XI

== Events ==
- The Treaty of Cardis formally discontinue the Russo-Swedish War (1656–58) with a Swedish victory and territorial gains.
- The Stockholms Banco becomes the first European bank to print banknotes. The background to this was that Sweden, at this time, had the world's heaviest coins, copper coins that were cumbersome (up to 20 kg –).
- March 28 - Erik Dahlbergh receives royal privilege to compose the series of illustrations titled Suecia antiqua et hodierna.
- Hedwig Eleonora buys the Drottningholm Palace a year after her role as Queen of Sweden ended, but it burnt to the ground on 30 December that same year. She engaged the architect Nicodemus Tessin the Elder to design and rebuild the castle.
- The Legal Deposit Act is passed, requiring the then established National Library of Sweden to collect copies of all printed works in Swedish.
- After the death of the former king of Sweden, Sweden is ruled by the Regency Council led by Hedvig Eleonora and 5 top officials.

== Births ==
- 26 June- Johanna Eleonora De la Gardie, poet (died 1708)
- 23 September - Christiana Oxenstierna, noblewoman notorious for marrying a partner of a different social class (died 1701)
- 10 December - Catherine of Pfalz-Zweibrücken (1661–1720), princess (died 1720)
- 18 December - Christopher Polhem, Swedish scientist, inventor and industrialist (died 1751)
- Rika Maja, Sami shaman (died 1757)

== Deaths ==
- 19 November - Lars Kagg, military officer (born 1595)
