= Gustava Johanna Stenborg =

Swedish artist (1776–1819)

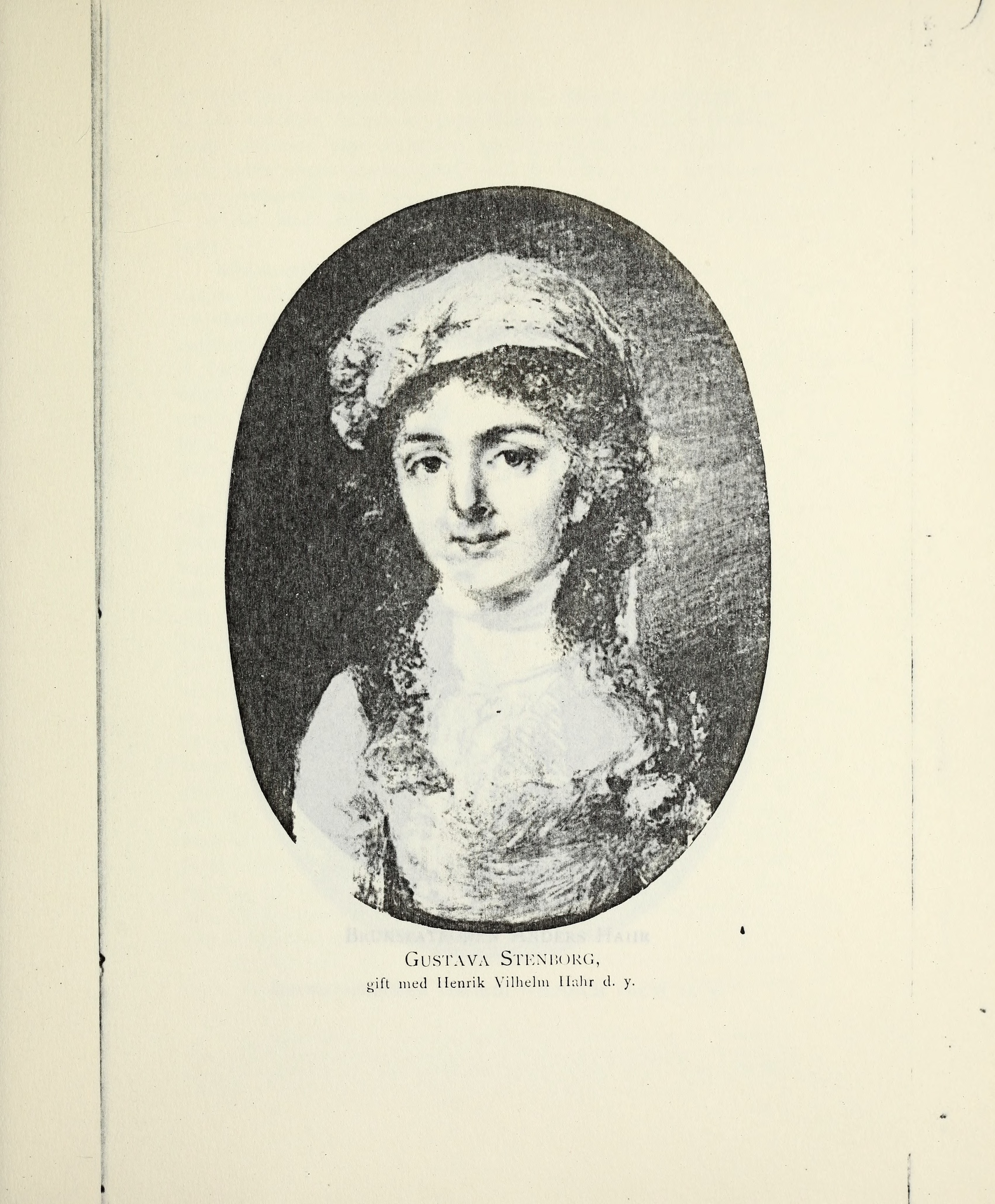
Gustava Stenborg

Gustava Johanna Stenborg, as married later Hahr and Yckerberg, (1776–1819), was a Swedish artist.

She was born to secretary Johan Fredrik Stenborg and Henrica Hellman. Stenborg was a textile artist (embroidery). She was a student in the Royal Swedish Academy of Arts when she participated in their 1790 art exhibition with a work in white sateen, for which she was awarded the memory prize of the royal academy. She was married to estate owner Henric Wilhelm Hahr Jr. in 1793, and to estate-clerk Per Otto Yckerberg in 1815.
