= Maria Daelder =

Swedish businesswoman

Maria Daelder (1627–1706), was a Swedish businessperson, wine and textile trader and banker.

== Life and work ==
Maria Daelder was born in 1627 in Amsterdam in the Netherlands. She married the wealthy wine merchant Sibrant Valck (1632–1681) and settled in the newly-founded Gothenburg in Sweden, a town where a large part of the inhabitants at this point was Dutch. Maria Daelder managed her own business separate from that of her husband; she imported and sold wine and textiles and managed a successful banking business where she lent clients money for interest.

Her business is evident from at least the years 1666–1676, from which her account books are preserved. Her business has been the object of research and is remarkable because of the following: according to the law of the time, a married woman was a legal minor under the guardianship of her husband and thus had no legal right to manage a business of her own separate from her husband (though it was common for wives to assist their husbands in their business). Maria Daelder, however, appears to have managed her own affairs completely separate from her husband's, with her own account books and without his legal interference, evidently with his support. She was reportedly successful and owned a fortune at the time of her death.
