= Brita von Cöln =

Swedish artist (died 1707)

Birgitta "Brita" von Cöln, or von Cöllen, née Stenkell, Stenkels or Steenzelia (died 1707), was a Swedish painter.

One of the spellings of her maiden name, Steenzelia, indicates that she was from a clerical family. She married the painter Anders von Cöln, and became the mother of the painters Carl Gustaf von Cöln and David von Cöln: her spouse, who was also a wall paper manufacturer, painted portraits of members of the royal court. Her known and preserved portraits are a portrait of professor Ericus Castovius from 1703, and a portrait of count Jacob Spens from probably before 1704.
