= Jacob Pettersson Degenaar =

Swedish pirate

Jacob Pettersson Degenaar (1692 – 1 February 1766) was a Swedish pirate. He was active as a privateer in the Baltic Sea during the War of the Austrian Succession. He operated with a French letter of marque. However, since all privateering had been banned by Swedish law at that point, he was technically considered a pirate.
