= 1710 in Sweden =

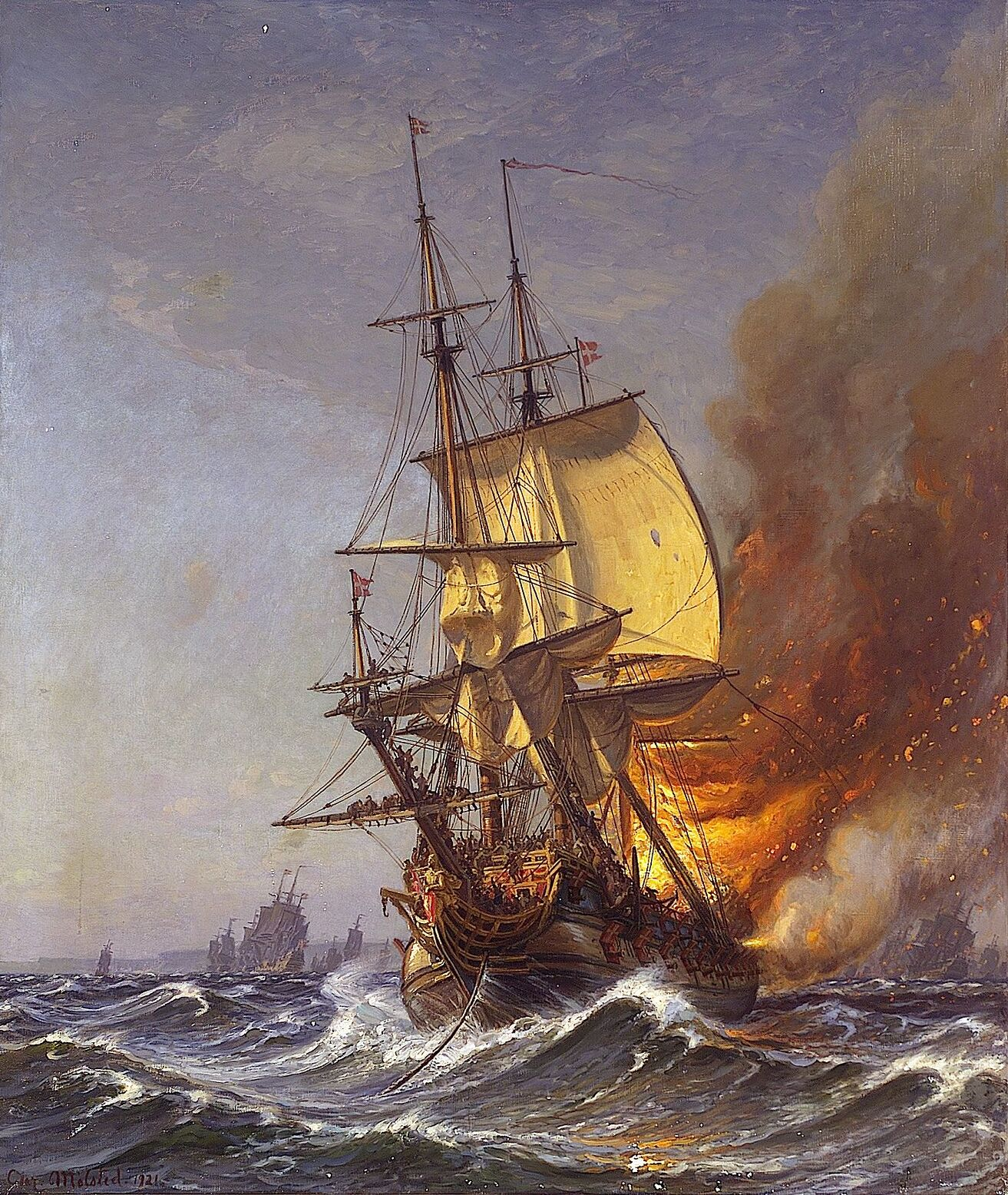
Dannebroge on fire at the Battle of Køge Bay

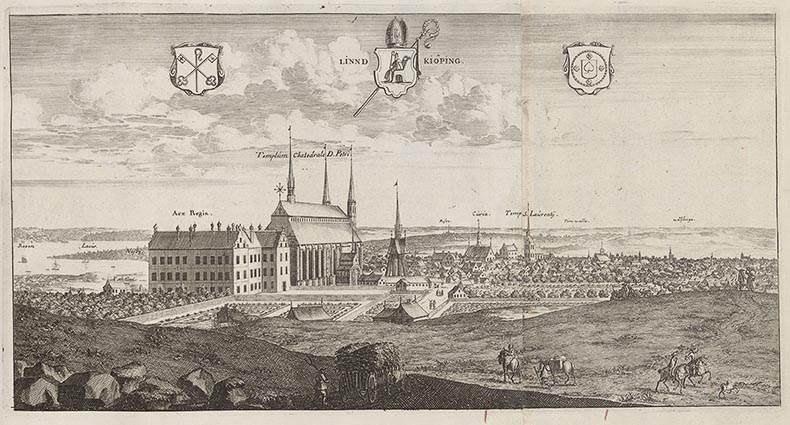
Linköping

Events from the year 1710 in Sweden

== Incumbents ==
- Monarch – Charles XII

== Events ==
- February - Battle of Helsingborg
- - Arvid Horn appointed Privy Council Chancellery.
- - Vyborg is taken by the Russians.
- July - The Great Northern War plague outbreak reach Stockholm.
- 15 July – 10 October - Capitulation of Estonia and Livonia
- August–September - The Great Northern War plague outbreak spread from the capital to the Swedish country.
- - Riga is taken by the Russians.
- 24 September - Battle of Køge Bay (1710)
- - Reval is taken by the Russians.
- - Scania is taken by the Danes.
- - Royal Society of Sciences in Uppsala
- - Lars Gathenhielm is given royal permission to act as a privateer in the Baltic Sea.

== Births ==
- Ulrica Catharina Stromberg, courtier (died 1777)

== Deaths ==
- 3 November - Maria de Croll, concert vocalist (born unknown date)
- Anna Maria Thelott, artist (born 1683)
- Dorothea Hoffman, hat maker
- Helena Lindelia, artist
