= Sten Carl Bielke =

Swedish politician (1709–1753)

Sten Bielke
- Born: 14 March 1709; Stockholm, Swedish Empire
- Died: 13 July 1753 (aged 44); Sweden
- Children: Johan
- Parent(s): Ture Bielke; Ursula Torne

Baron Sten Carl Bielke (14 March 1709 - 13 July 1753) was a Swedish Friherre, official, scientist, and member of the House of Nobility of the Swedish Diet. His father was the Landshövding Baron Ture Bielke and his mother was Ursula Kristina Törne.

Bielke was together with Carl Linnaeus a founding member of the Royal Swedish Academy of Sciences, which was founded in 1739. He was a patron of the scholar Pehr Kalm.

He received a private education and started his career as an amanuensis at the Royal Library (Kungliga biblioteket) in Sweden. He eventually became a Justice of the hovrätt (Court of Appeal) in Åbo (Turku, in present-day Finland). He was also politically active in the Caps.
