= 1702 in Sweden =

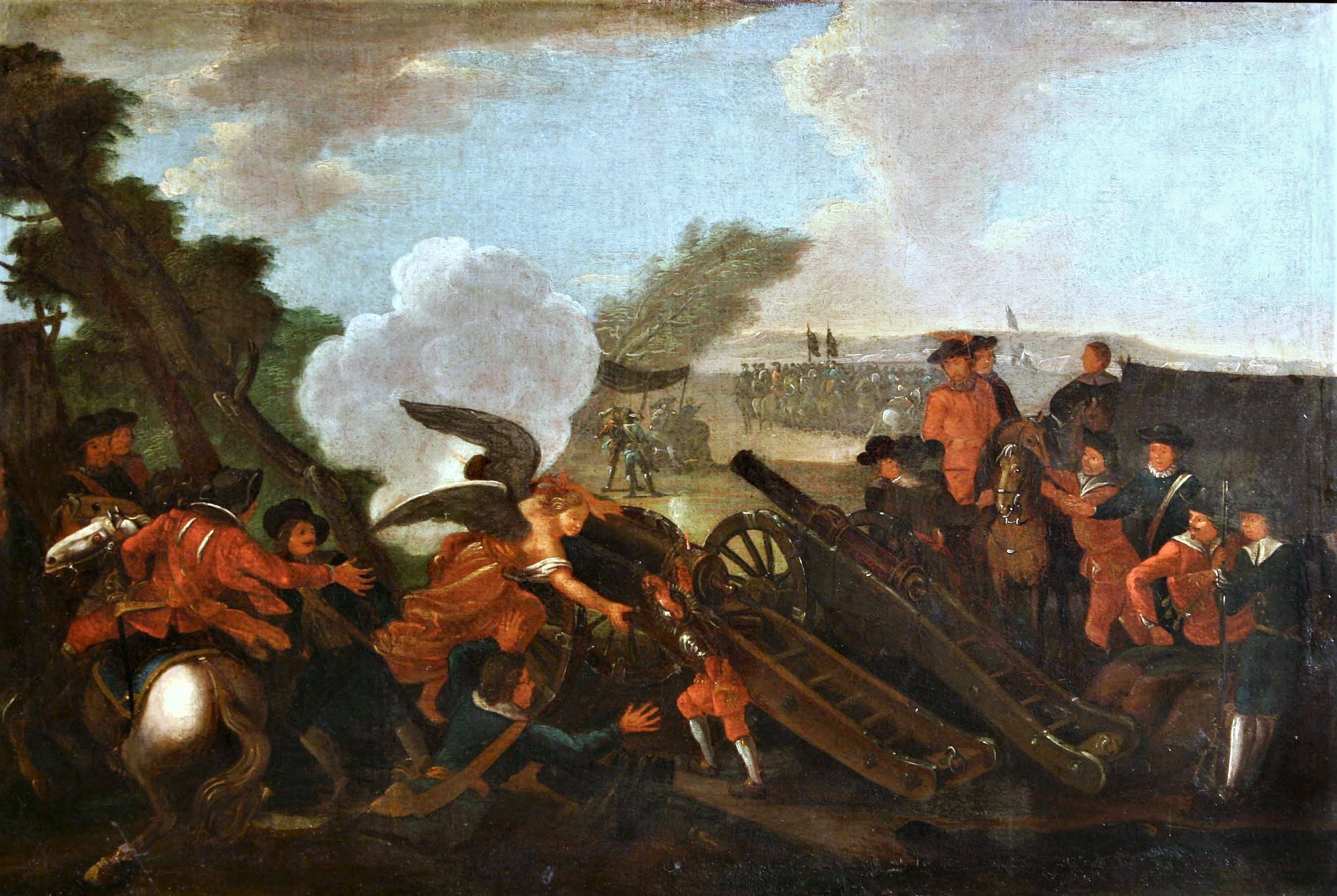
Battle of Kliszow

Events from the year 1702 in Sweden

== Incumbents ==
- Monarch – Charles XII

== Events ==
- May – Warsaw is conquered by Charles XII of Sweden.
- July 19 (July 8 O.S.; July 9 Swedish calendar) – Battle of Klissow: Charles XII of Sweden decisively defeats the Polish–Lithuanian-Saxon army.
- 9 July - Battle of Klissow
- 19 July - Battle of Hummelshof

== Births ==
- 4 March - Lorens Pasch the Elder, painter (died 1766)
- May - Bakelse-Jeanna, street seller and local profile (died 1788)
- Unknown date - Margareta Momma, journalist and feminist (died 1772)
- Unknown date - Christian Berner, ballet dancer (died 1773)

== Deaths ==
- 12 July - Bengt Gabrielsson Oxenstierna, politician (born 1623)
- 12 December - Olaus Rudbeck, scientist (born 1630)
