= Niclas Gustaf Duncan =

Niclas Gustaf Duncan (20 November 1711 – 23 April 1771) was a Swedish post official and spy. Between 1743 and 1748, he was active as an agent of Carl Gustaf Tessin to act as a double agent in Swedish service and spy on the Russian diplomat Johann Albrecht Korff under the protect of acting as his spy on Herman Cedercreutz, who was the Swedish envoy in Russia at the time.
