= Per Stålhammar =

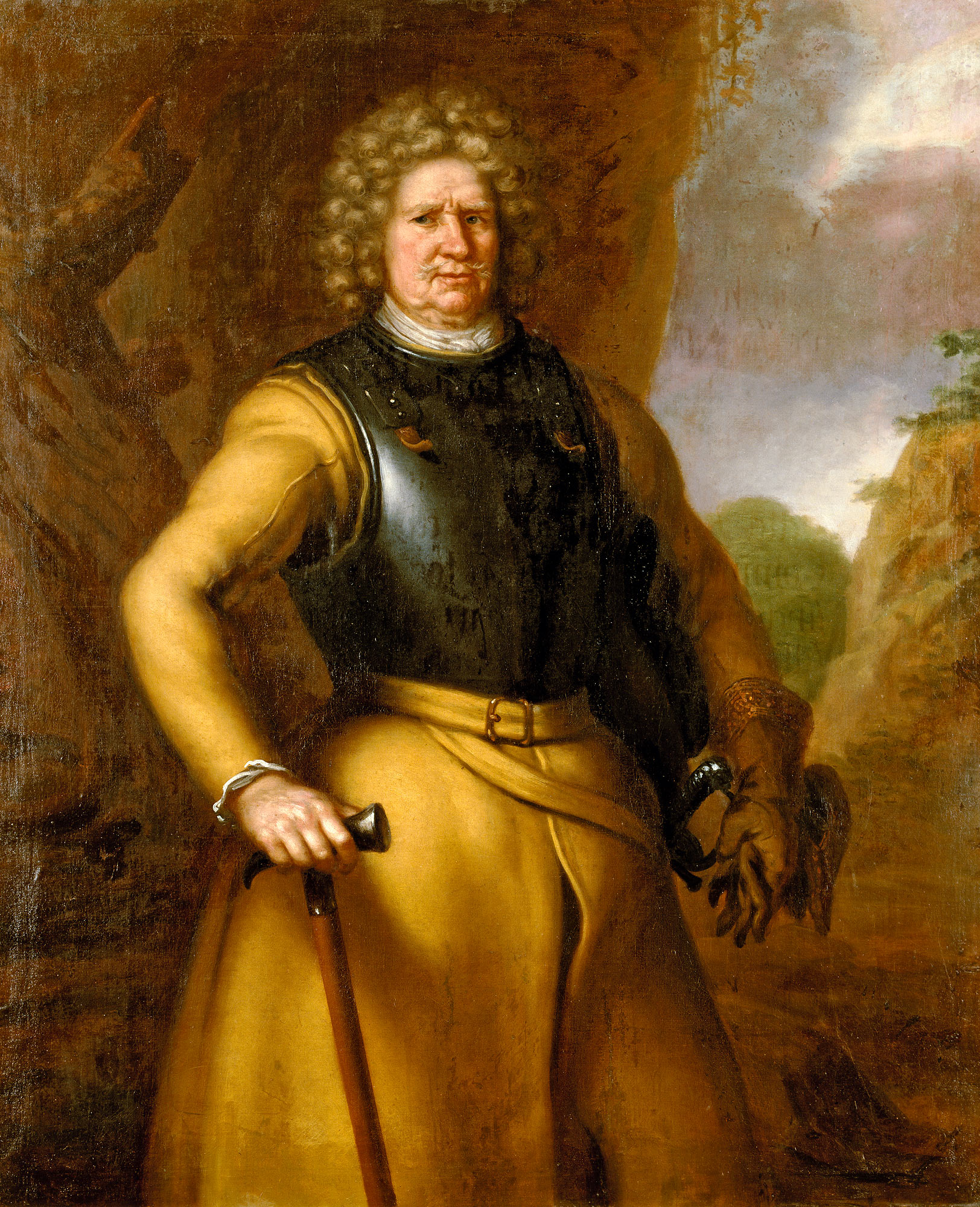
Per Stålhammar in 1692.

Per Stålhammar (born Per Jönsson; c. 1612 – January 8, 1701) was a Swedish military officer and soldier under the rule of Gustavus Adolphus, Christina, Charles X, and Charles XI. Stålhammar was born in Angved in Svenarum Parish, Småland, Sweden as Per Jönsson. He grew up on a small farm which his father, Jöns Gudmundsson (died c. 1629), leased from the crown. Stålhammar's mother was Karin Pedersdotter.

During childhood Stålhammar used to put sheep out to pasture on his father's farm, but already in 1626 Stålhammar followed a local captain of German descent, Caspar Witte (later knighted Caspar von Witten af Stensjö), to the war with Poland. At this point the young Stålhammar was not a regular soldier but a trossdräng, a menial position in the supply train organization of the army. After the Truce of Altmark was signed in 1629 Stålhammar returned to Sweden.

In 1633 Stålhammar became a cavalryman at the regiment Smålands ryttare and his name was changed from Per Jönsson to Per Jönsson Hammar (from Swedish hammare, "hammer"). He was known for his excellent bravery and was promoted to quartermaster in 1640. In 1644 he became a corporal and in 1650 a cornet.

Some years earlier, in September 1644, Stålhammar married Caspar Witte's daughter Susanna. She died already on July 7, 1645, and two years later Stålhammar married his second wife Anna Skytte. On August 30, 1650, Stålhammar was knighted and his surname was changed to Stålhammar by adding the Swedish stål, "steel", to his previous surname. In 1656 Stålhammar became a lieutenant, in 1657 a rittmeister, on June 2, 1663, a major, and on March 6, 1677, he became colonel of his regiment. He retired in August 1692.

Stålhammar took part in many wars. As a teenager he followed Smålands ryttare on their military campaign against the Poles in Prussia. Apart from the Thirty Years' War Stålhammar also participated in wars against Poland and Denmark. As a colonel in the 1680s Stålhammar introduced the allotment system at his regiment. Stålhammar was the founder of the Stålhammar family, and the grandfather of Ulrika Eleonora Stålhammar. The Hultsvik mansion which was built by Stålhammar in the 1650s still exists.
