= 1704 in Sweden =

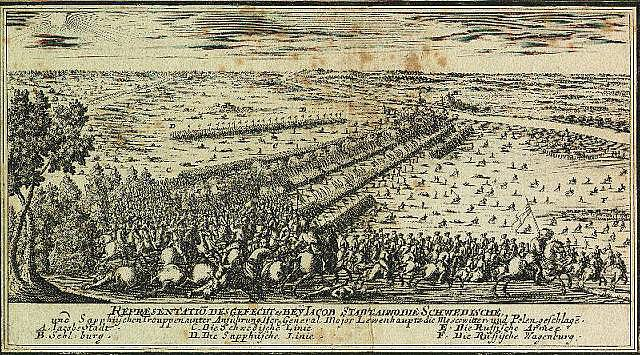
The Battle of Jakobstadt (engraving from the Johann Christoph Brotze's collection)

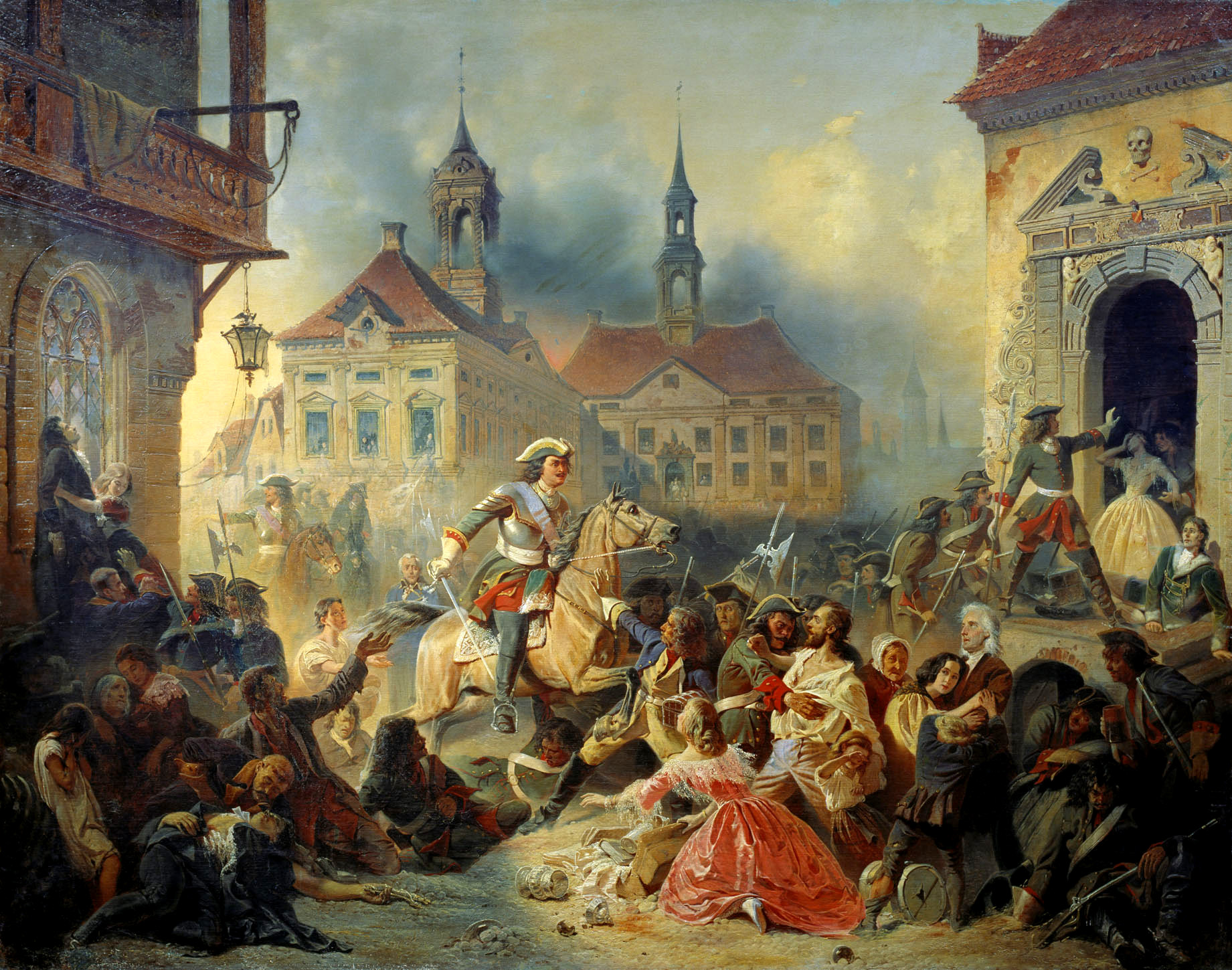
Peter the Great leads the Russian troops capturing Narva in 1704

Events from the year 1704 in Sweden.

== Incumbents ==
- Monarch – Charles XII

== Events ==
- 29 February – This date was intended to be skipped in the calendar, but was not. See February 30#Swedish calendar.
- 14 May – Russian victory in the Second Battle on Peipus.
- 15 June – The last execution for witchcraft in Sweden: Anna Eriksdotter is decapitated.
- 16 June – Battle of Wesenberg (1704)
- 25 July – Battle of Jakobstadt
- July 12 – Great Northern War – Charles XII of Sweden forces the election of his ally Stanisław Leszczyński as King of Poland in place of Augustus II the Strong.
- 9 August – Battle of Poznań (1704)
- 10 August – Battle of Narva (1704)
  - The enslavement of Lovisa von Burghausen.
- 6 September - The Storming of Lemberg
- 28 October – Battle of Poniec

== Births ==
- 1 November - Erland Broman, royal favorite (died 1757)

== Deaths ==
- 15 June - Anna Eriksdotter, last person executed for witchcraft (born 1624)
