= 1707 in Sweden =

Events from the year 1707 in Sweden

== Incumbents ==
- Monarch – Charles XII
- Archbishop of Uppsala - Erik Benzelius (the Elder)

== Events ==
- 31 August - Treaty of Altranstädt (1707) signed between Charles XII of Sweden and Joseph I, Holy Roman Emperor, during the Great Northern War.
- The Ramlösa mineral water brand was established in 1707, becoming a well-known Swedish brand.
- Charles XII continued his military campaigns in Eastern Europe as part of the Great Northern War, which had significant impacts on Sweden's political and military landscape.

== Births ==
- 23 May - Carl von Linné, botanist, physician and zoologist (died 1778)

== Deaths ==
- - Brita von Cöln, painter (year of birth unknown)
- - Catarina Wentin, royal midwife (born 1637)
