= John Filip Nordlund =

Swedish mass murderer (1875–1900)

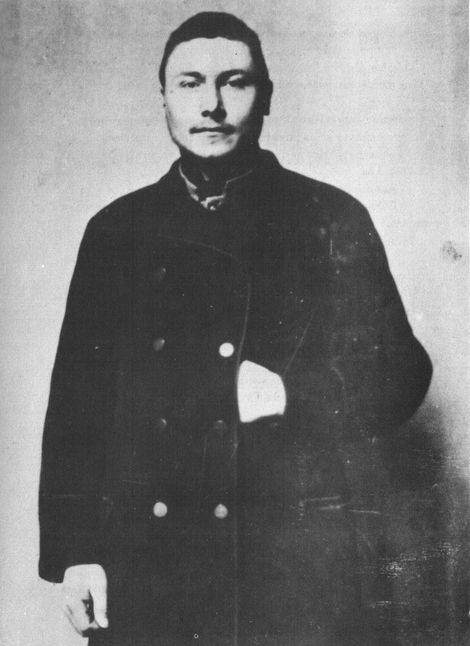
- Nordlund in 1899
- Born: 23 March 1875; Säter, Sweden
- Died: 10 December 1900 (aged 25); Västerås County Jail, Västerås, Sweden
- Status: Executed by beheading
- Convictions: Murder (5 counts); Attempted murder (8 counts); Theft
- Penalty: Death

Details
- Date: 17 May 1900
- Locations: Steam boat ferry between Arboga and Stockholm
- Killed: 5
- Injured: 8
- Weapons: Knife; Two revolvers

John Filip Nordlund (also known as "Mälarmördaren", "Mordlund", "Svarte Filip") (23 March 1875 – 10 December 1900) was a Swedish mass murderer, the penultimate person to be executed in Sweden (after Alfred Ander in 1910) and the last person to be executed through manual beheading in Sweden.

== Early years ==
Nordlund was born in Övre Stubbersbo, near Säter outside Falun. He had two siblings, Joel, an older brother who was a deaf mute, and a younger brother named Rickard. Histories are told of the young Nordlund as an odd child who never laughed. In 1882 the family moved to Falun where Nordlund went to school, but being of an impatient nature he never finished school. Instead he took to the road, at first with a classmate who was an orphan, in 1886. Later that year, he was spotted by a friend of his parents in Hedemora, and returned to home. In 1887 he was on the run again, and as a person of both size and strength he had the ability to work, passing as an adult. For a brief period, one and a half years, he worked at a lumber mill in Korsnäs, which, according to himself, was the only time he tried to live an honest life. Still he gave in to temptation and forged a bill, which got him fired from the lumber mill. His parents had now moved to Gävle; Nordlund also lived there for a short period of time.

Nordlund had gotten used to thieving during his time on the road and in 1891 he was arrested and sentenced to four months in prison for cattle rustling by a court in Ljusdal. Later the same year he received his first long term prison sentence, this time for stealing, when he was sentenced to three years in prison. The prison term was served at the county jail in Malmö. In 1895 he received another three-year sentence which was to be served in Långholmen Prison in Stockholm, where he was enrolled as prisoner number two. Due to unruly behaviour in prison and other things he was to serve four years and according to letters written by himself in 1900, it was here his plan for the future took its final and drastic shape.

The 20 April 1900, Nordlund was released from Långholmen and with the help of his younger brother, who was now living in Stockholm and working as a clerk, he went home to Gävle. As an ex-convict he had difficulties getting a job, so soon he returned to his old life, but this time with a disastrous plan of one final big hit that would solve his problems.

== Mass murder on the steam boat ferry Prins Carl ==
On the night of 16 and 17 May 1900 Nordlund committed the act that would make him the bogeyman of several years to come, and reserve a place for him in the criminal history of Sweden.

He boarded the ferry in Arboga and bought a ticket for Stockholm that evening. The contents of his luggage were two revolvers, several knives and padlocks, with which he had planned to lock the door to the engine room. His plan was to rob and kill as many people as possible on the ship and steal the ship's register. To avoid early detection he also planned to torch the ship. This plan failed however, partly because scared passengers on the boat managed to attract the attention of another ferry, the "Köping". Still he managed to commit one of the worst murder sprees in known Swedish history by killing four and wounding nine (of whom 8 survived) and a partly trashed ship. The victims of Nordlund's rampage included the ship's captain (Olof Rönngren), a butcher, an old lady, a farmer and a cattle merchant. His plan also failed in the aspect that he did not manage to steal the ship's register, leaving his booty at 845 kronor. He managed to escape from the ship because no one thought that one single man could be strong enough to put one of the life boats in the sea and row away.

The next day he was arrested by three police officers at the train station in Skogstorp near Eskilstuna, where he had bought some new clothes earlier and avoided detection. He had planned to take the train to Oxelösund and travel to Copenhagen via Gothenburg. When he was arrested he is supposed to have shouted things like; "This was my revenge on humanity" and "Be glad that you arrested me here – if I had gotten on the train several more would have been killed".

== After the arrest ==
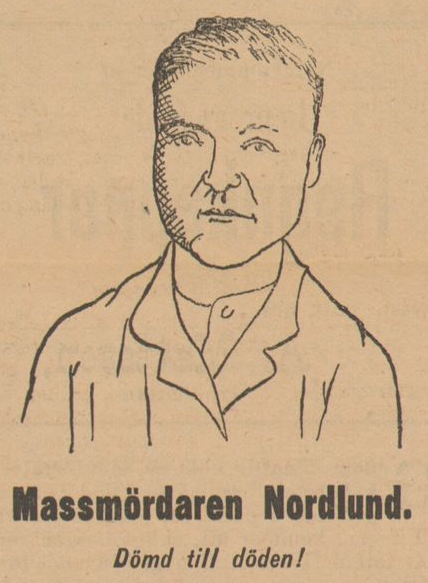
"The Mass Murderer Nordlund. Sentenced to death!"

He was put in a holding cell in Eskilstuna, in which the guards were barely able to keep an angry mob from killing him. On 18 May he wrote a letter to his family, explaining what he had done and that he was the one responsible for the newspaper headlines. The letter was published by the newspapers (both Gefle Dagblad and Aftonbladet). In the letter he wrote that he had to explain himself to someone and that he realised that he would receive only one more sentence, capital punishment. He also told them not to grieve and that he welcomed the end since he never felt that he was a part of the society at all.

In court he never tried to act in a manner which would result in a lighter sentence; he never pleaded insanity, he showed no remorse saying only that he regretted not having killed everyone on the ferry. He was sentenced to death and to forever lose all privileges as a citizen for five murders, eight attempted murders and theft. Twice he tried to flee from his cell in Västerås county jail injuring the jailors with a sharp object that he managed to manufacture in the cell. He attempted to escape once, because he had nothing to lose but to await execution.

The act that he committed resulted in a media hysteria comparable to the ones we see today, partly because the ruthlessness of the crimes. Several papers competed with each other on several numbers of victims. In some papers the number of victims was exaggerated, claiming a much larger death toll. Several skillingtryck were made about the events on Prins Carl with songs detailing the horrors of the night of 17 May.

== Execution ==
Nordlund had the possibility of writing a letter to King Oscar II pleading for mercy, which he chose not to do. Strangely enough, he took the time to write a letter to the Supreme Court complaining about the fact that he had been wrongfully sentenced for robbery of people that he did not rob. The Supreme Court wrote in their answer (of 13 November) that this was irrelevant and that the sentence passed by the court was correct. While awaiting his execution he met his mother several times (the last time five days before his execution). In addition the priest from Långholmen, August Hylander came to visit him several times. In his final letter to his parents he actually asked the Lord for redemption and told his parents good bye.

On the morning of 10 December Nordlund was escorted to the prison yard of Västerås County Jail where he was strapped to a stretcher-resembling block and beheaded by the high executioner Dahlman using a manual blade, rather much resembling a meat cleaver. Nordlund's execution was swift, striking the head off in a single blow.

== Aftermath ==
The year 1900 was one of the darkest for the people who wanted to abolish capital punishment in Sweden with three executions in the same year, all by decapitation (between 1866 and 1900 there were 11 executions in total). The people who argued that one inherited the role as a criminal and the people who wanted to keep the death penalty used Nordlund as an example of why this penalty was necessary. Abolitionists such as Hjalmar Branting only argued that it was unfortunate that Nordlund had been released from prison.

Some have claimed that the way Nordlund acted after being caught is a proof of insanity, and that his lack of empathy for his victims also proves this. It has been said that had he not committed the act in a time when several gruesome murders were committed he would probably have received a lighter sentence (or been sent to an insanity asylum). The claims of insanity and the fact that two of the three persons executed in 1900 were claimed to have been insane, probably had an effect on the justice system with a 10-year stretch of reprieves until the execution of Alfred Ander by guillotine, the last ever in Sweden.

== Sources ==
1. Aftonbladet 18 May 1900 "Mördarens antecedentia"
2. Aftonbladet 20 May 1900, letter to parents
3. Aftonbladet 11 December 1900
4. Ekholm, Jan Olof; Sperlings, Sven (1979). "Hur jag blifvit den jag är, Allmänna meningar". Mälarmördaren: historien om ett brott (in Swedish). Stockholm: Bonnier. pp. 137–174. ISBN 91-0-044117-1.
