= 1772 in Sweden =

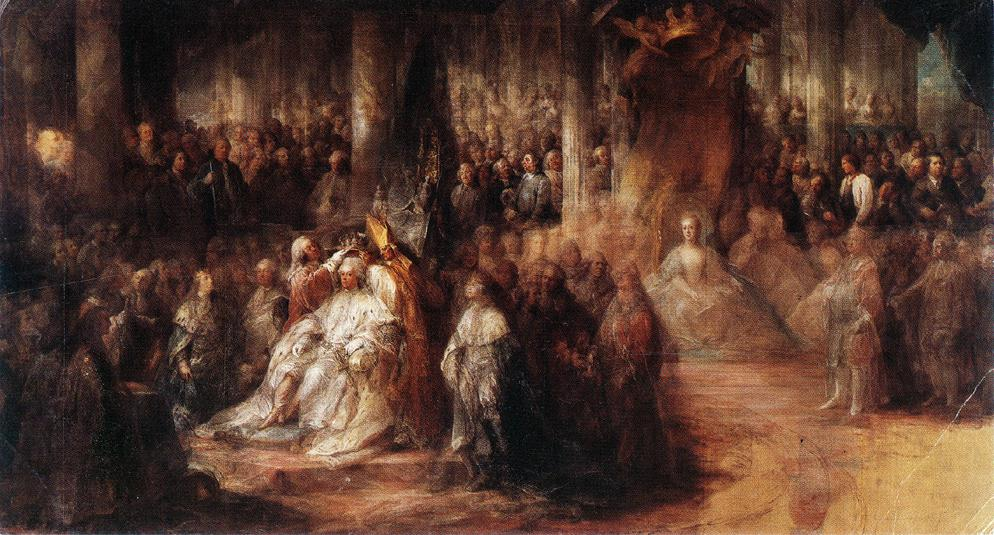
Coronation

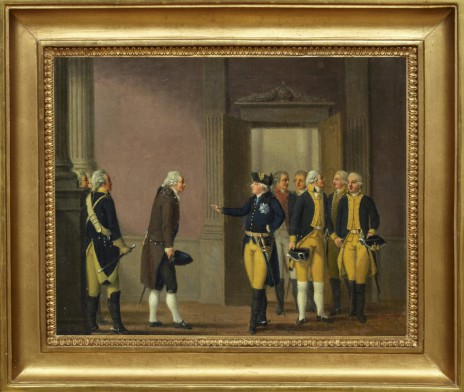
Gustav III at the Revolution of 1772

Events from the year 1772 in Sweden

== Incumbents ==
- Monarch – Gustav III

== Events ==
- February - The pamphlet Det Olyckliga Swenska Fruentimrets Böneskrift till Allmänheten by Anna Maria Rückerschöld, counted as one of the first feminist publications in the women's issue in Sweden.
- 29 May – Coronation of King Gustav III and Queen Sophia Magdalena in Stockholm.
- 29 May – The Order of Vasa is created to honour any Swedish who made advancements in agriculture, mining.
- June - Johan Christopher Toll arrive in Scania to prepare a coup d'état.
- July - Jakob Magnus Sprengtporten arrive in Finland and take hold of the Sveaborg Fortress in preparation of a coup d'état.
- 12 August – Rebellion in Scania.
- 16 August – Rebellion in Finland.
- 19 August – Revolution of 1772: King Gustav III stages a coup d'état against the parliament in Stockholm with the support of Hovpartiet.
- 21 August – King Gustav III forces the parliament to accept the Swedish Constitution of 1772.
- 22 August – Joachim von Düben resign as President of the Chancellor.
- 23 August – Ulrik Scheffer appointed President of the Chancellor.
- 26 August – King Gustav III formally abolish torture, and the Rose Chamber in Nya smedjegården and the Thief Cellar in the Town Hall, is closed.
- September – The legal manufacture of Brännvin for personal use is banned because of the crop's failure.
- 9 November – A Pawnbroker of the state is founded in Stockholm.
- 2 December - Foundation of the Royal Physiographic Society in Lund.
- 8 December - The Sahlgrenska University Hospital is founded.
- - Widespread famine in Sweden following widespread crop failures in 1771 continuing in 1772, particularly in the middle and southern parts of the country.
- - The Royal Swedish Academy of Letters, History and Antiquities resume its activity.
- - Gustafs skål by Carl Michael Bellman.
- - The Stenborg Company performs before the King, who wish to reinstate a Swedish language theater at Bollhuset.
- - The permit to engage in Tobacco trade is foremost to be granted to (widowed and married) women in need to support themselves.
- - Royal Patriotic Society is founded.
- - First issue of Hwad Nytt?? Hwad Nytt??

== Births ==
- 9 February – Frans Michael Franzén, poet (died 1847)
- 25 April – Louis Deland, ballet dancer (died 1823)
- 7 June - Aurora Liljenroth, scholar (died 1836)
- 10 June – Greta Naterberg, folk singer (d. 1818)
- 3 November – Carl Löwenhielm, diplomat (died 1861)
- 22 November – Lars Hjortsberg, actor (died 1843)
- 14 December – Wendela Gustafva Sparre, textile artist and a member of the Royal Swedish Academy of Arts (died 1855)
- Unknown date - Euphrosyne Löf, ballet dancer, actress, courtesan and royal mistress (died 1868)
  - Louise Götz, actress

== Deaths ==
- 29 March - Emanuel Swedenborg, scientist, philosopher, theologian, revelator, and mystic (born 1688)
- Jeanne Du Londel, actor (born 1706)
- Augustin Ehrensvärd military officer (born 1710)
