= Carl von Platen (photographer) =

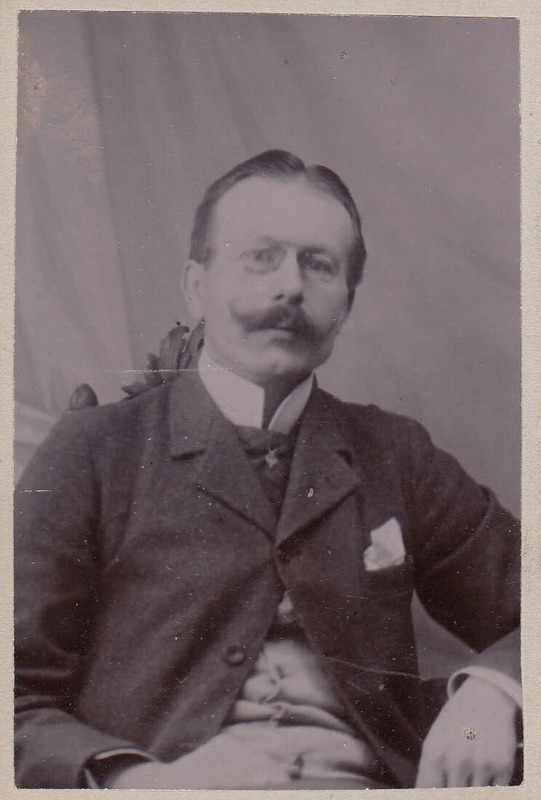
- Born: Carl Ludvig Gustaf von Platen; April 14, 1863; Stockholm, Sweden
- Status: Declared legally incompetent (1903–1929)
- Died: February 27, 1929 (aged 65); Solna, Stockholm, Sweden
- Education: Uppsala University
- Occupations: Photographer, writer, music critic, civil servant
- Known for: Pioneer of early homoerotic photography in Sweden
- Notable work: Confiscated photographic collection (c. 1900–1903)
- Parent(s): Carl Ludvig Gustaf von Platen and Clara Virginia Hierta

Carl Ludvig Gustaf von Platen (April 14, 1863 – February 27, 1929) was a Swedish aristocrat, photographer, and writer. He is historically recognized for his pioneering, yet controversial, body of homoerotic photography, created primarily in Stockholm in the early 1900s, which led to his legal prosecution.

== Biography ==
=== Early life ===
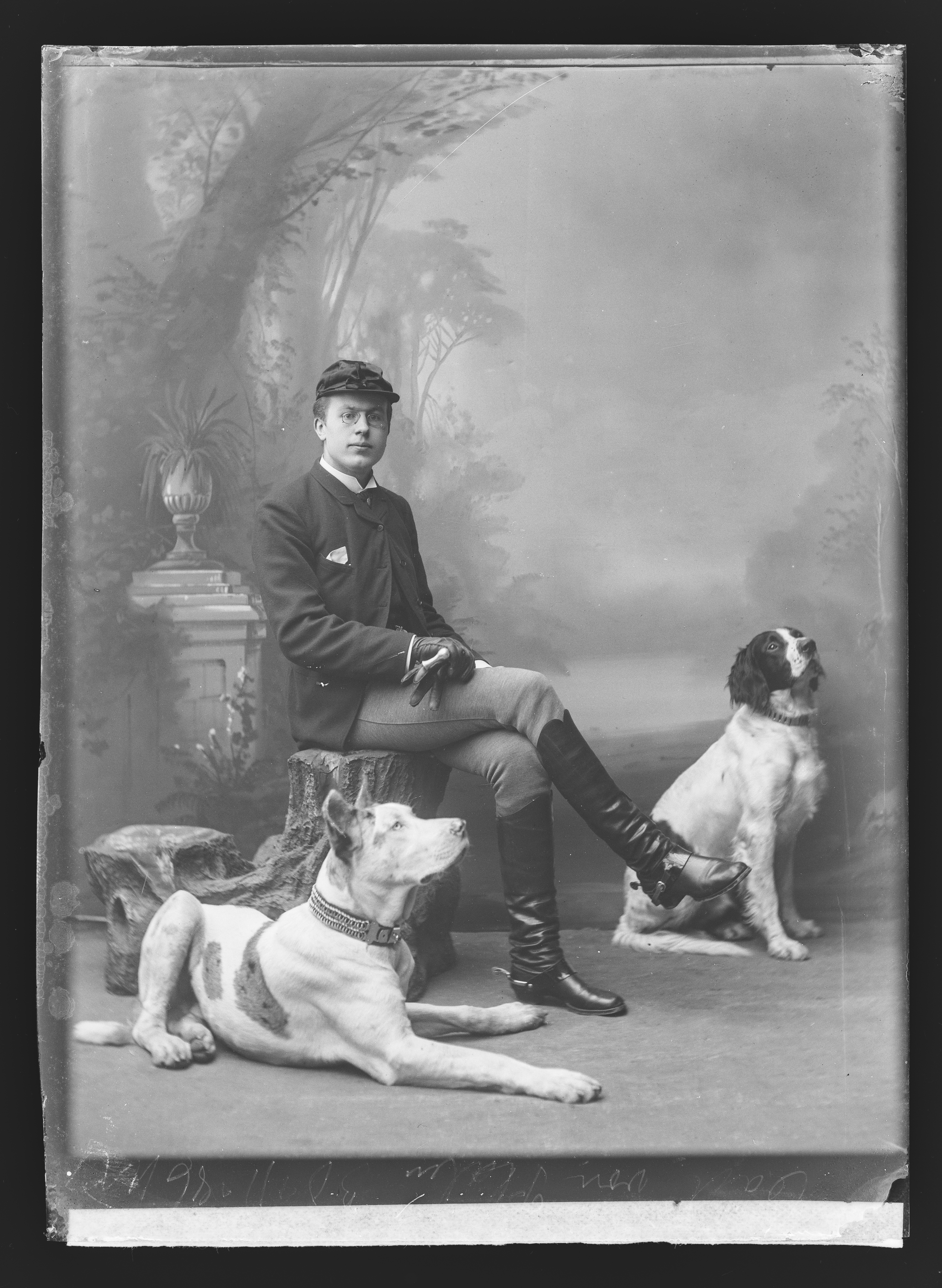
Carl von Platen when he studied in Uppsala in 1881

Carl von Platen was born in Stockholm, Sweden, into the prominent, noble von Platen family. He was the son of Carl Ludvig Gustaf von Platen (1824–1904) and Clara Virginia Hierta (1839–1863). He attended Uppsala University, graduating in 1882 with a law preliminary examination. For a period, he held positions as an assistant professor (amanuens) at the National Museum and the Royal Library, beginning in 1887. He also maintained an upper-class lifestyle, owning a share in a house in Stockholm and a villa in Råsunda. He was known to have private means, which afforded him extensive travel. In addition to photography, von Platen was a prolific travel writer and music critic. From 1898 to 1913, often using the pseudonym "Anteros", he published almost one hundred reviews and musical overviews, primarily from Italy, in the journal Svensk Musiktidning - Swedish Music Magazine. He later published a collection of his essays in three volumes, as well as books on actors and ballet dancers.

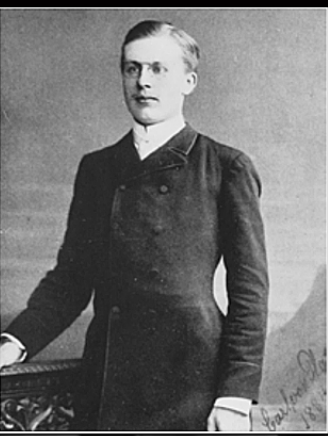
Carl von Platen in 1884

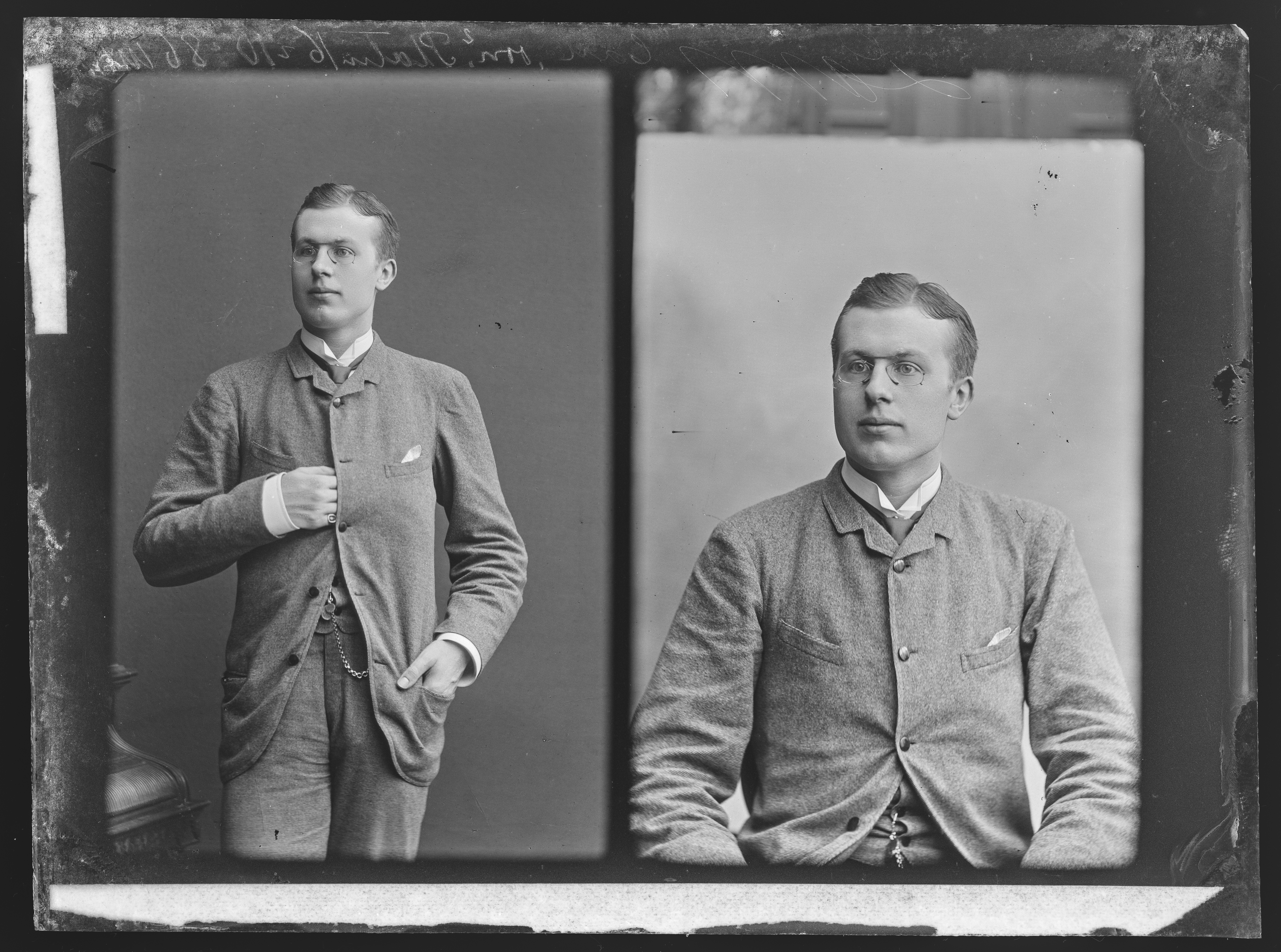
Carl von Platen in 1886

=== Legal and personal troubles ===
Von Platen's photographic activities led to significant legal trouble.In the autumn of 1903, police raided his Stockholm apartment and confiscated three photo albums, which were intended as evidence of homosexuality. He was arrested and charged with indecency. To spare him from prison and the family from public disgrace, his father successfully argued to the Stockholm City Court that Carl was mentally unbalanced due to his "homosexual inclination" and should be declared legally incompetent. Von Platen, at the age of 40, was declared incapacitated, which resulted in his release from Långholmen prison after a stay in a private psychiatric center. The declaration of incompetence did not significantly restrict his upper-class lifestyle. He continued to travel and write extensively across Europe.

Fifteen years later, von Platen was arrested a second time in Malmö for attempting to kiss a young lift-boy at the Kramer hotel, again running afoul of the law prohibiting same-sex acts.

=== Death ===
Carl von Platen died on February 27, 1929, at the age of 65, still legally declared incompetent.

== Photography and style ==
Von Platen's photographic work, which dates primarily to the turn of the 20th century, is highly notable for its openly homoerotic themes during a period when same-sex relationships were criminalized in Sweden. His subjects were primarily working-class youths and military men—often his sexual partners—a preference that mirrored contemporaries like Oscar Wilde. A known partner and his frequent model was Fredrik Moberg. The photographs were taken indoors in a makeshift studio, often using hastily hung curtains in his home on Sturegatan in Stockholm. Unlike the outdoor, nude, classical style of Wilhelm von Gloeden or the athletic figures of his Swedish contemporary Eugène Jansson, von Platen's images depict men in more intimate, domestic scenarios. The images show sitters in a state of casual undress, classical drapery, or Italian costumes, and some men are depicted in drag (men wearing women's clothes). While not fully nude (which would have been immediately illegal), the photographs often included suggestive attire like bathing costumes or gymnastics clothes, and sometimes featured smaller nude images visible on the walls in the background, creating a loaded, yet technically covert, sexual allusion.

== Legacy ==
Following the 1903 police raid, no other photographs of von Platen's are known to exist besides those confiscated by the Stockholm police. His surviving work is now held as a unique historical record of early modern queer life and photography in Sweden. The casual nature of his images—which often show a comfortable intimacy between the upper-class photographer and his working-class models—is considered by scholars to be particularly unusual and revealing for the socially stratified period in which he worked.

== Exhibitions ==
- 2009 Confiscated Images - works of Carl von Platen. Museum of Gothenburg
- 2016 Confiscated Images of Carl von Platen. Karlsgatan 2, Museum of Swedish & Nordic contemporary art. Vasteras

== Notes ==
- Steorn, Patrik (2007-04-18). Atletik och bildkultur kring ar 1900 Kroppstyper och bildbruk. Stockholm: Stockholm University. ISSN 1652-7224.
- Åkerö, Emil K.V. Male Love – a socialhistorical artanalysis of the history of love between men. Linköping University.
- Liljekvist, Martin (2014). Fornication against nature: A queer analysis of the historiography of Carl von Platen. Stockholm University, Faculty of Humanities, Department of Art History.
- "Svenska Musikverket, Issue N.r.7" (PDF). Svenska Musikverket (7). 4 April 1907.
