= John Scale =

John Dymoke Scale
- Born: 27 December 1882; England
- Known for: MI6 agent; Alleged involvement in the murder of Rasputin

Lieutenant Colonel John Dymoke Scale DSO, OBE (27 December 1882 – 22 April 1949) was an MI6 (SIS) agent who was involved in a British propaganda unit called the Anglo-Russian Commission in St Petersburg, where his responsibilities included running Mohammed Beck Hadjetlaché.

Scale was originally from Merthyr Tydfil in Glamorgan. He was commissioned into the British Army as a second lieutenant in the Royal Warwickshire Regiment on 8 May 1901, and was in September 1902 seconded for service with the British Indian Army. He was first sent to Russia in 1912, qualified as a Russian translator in 1913 and rejoined the 87th Punjabis in 1914. In 1916, Scale served with Stephen Alley and Oswald Rayner under Mansfield Cumming at the time of the murder of Grigori Rasputin. Whilst a captain in St Petersburg, in the weeks leading up to the killing, Scale is recorded as having met with Oswald Rayner and Felix Yusupov in the diary of their chauffeur, William Compton. Several other books and documentaries have claimed Scale's involvement in Rasputin's death, or even alleged that Scale commanded Rayner to fatally shoot him. A letter from Alley to Scale provides the best evidence of British Intelligence involvement in the murder and torture that reads:

Dear Scale, ... Although matters here have not proceeded entirely to plan, our objective has clearly been achieved. Reaction to the demise of "Dark Forces" has been well received, although a few awkward questions have already been asked about wider involvement. Rayner is attending to loose ends and will no doubt brief you on your return."

In March 1918, Scale was an SIS bureau commander in Stockholm.
