= Oswald Rayner =

British secret field agent

Oswald Theodore Rayner
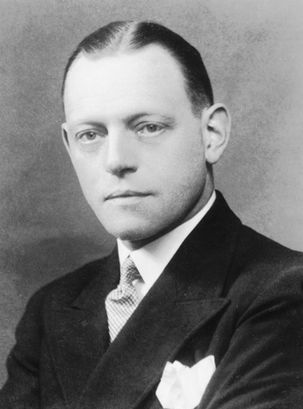
- Rayner in the 1930s
- Born: 29 November 1888; Smethwick, Staffordshire, England
- Died: 6 March 1961 (aged 72); Botley, Oxfordshire, England
- Known for: MI6 agent; Alleged possible involvement in the plot to kill Rasputin

Oswald Theodore Rayner (29 November 1888, in Smethwick, Staffordshire, England – 6 March 1961, in Botley, Oxfordshire, England) was a British Secret Intelligence Service (MI6) field agent who operated covertly in the Russian Empire during the First World War. He is believed by some to have been involved in the final murder plot against Grigori Rasputin, but "the archives of the British intelligence service (MI6) do not hold a single document linking Rayner, Hoare, or any other British agent or diplomat to the murder."

== Life ==
Oswald Theodore Rayner was born in Smethwick, the son of Thomas Rayner, a draper in Soho Street and his wife Florence. Between 1907 and 1910, Rayner studied modern languages at Oriel College, Oxford. During his time at Oxford, Rayner formed a close relationship with Felix Yusupov, who was also enrolled at the university. In 1910 Rayner became a solicitor at the HM Treasury. Rayner was highly proficient in French, German, and Russian, and in December 1915 he was recruited by MI6 as an intelligence officer under Sir Samuel Hoare, head of the British Intelligence Service in Russia. He was living at Hotel Astoria. In 1918 he was sent to Stockholm; in 1919 to Vladivostok. In 1920 he left the secret service and became Foreign Correspondent for the Daily Telegraph in Finland.

== SIS ==
British intelligence reports, sent between London and Petrograd in 1916, indicate that the British were not only extremely concerned about Rasputin's displacement of pro-British ministers in the Russian government but, even more importantly, his apparent insistence on withdrawing Russian troops from the war. This withdrawal would have allowed the Germans to transfer their Eastern Front troops to the Western Front, leading to a massive outnumbering of the Allies and threatening their defeat. Whether this was actually Rasputin's intent or whether he was simply concerned about the huge number of Russian casualties (as the Empress's letters indicate) is in dispute, but it is clear that the British perceived him as a real threat to the war effort.

Neither Vladimir Purishkevich nor Yusupov mention the close-quarter shot to the forehead. The only account of what went on in that basement room comes from Yusupov, and he changed his story several times. Purishkevich came down the stairs and fired in the courtyard at Rasputin from behind at a distance of twenty paces. He hit Rasputin in the back of the head. However, there is no photo of the rear of Rasputin's head. According to Andrew Cook, Rayner is supposed to have been the person who fired the third shot on the forehead that actually killed Rasputin. The calibre of the weapon that was used cannot be determined. "The hypothesis that the gunshot to the head was caused by an unjacketed bullet (of British origin) is not supported by the forensic findings or police forensic photographs." Nelipa thinks it is not very likely a Webley .455-inch and an unjacketed bullet was used, because its impact would have been different.

== Speculations ==
There were two officers of the British Secret Intelligence Service (SIS) in Petrograd at the time, Oswald Rayner and Stephen Alley. They may have offered advice, but it is unclear if they were present at the Moika palace. Rayner had visited the Sandro's palace on the day of the murder. This account is further supported by an audience between the British Ambassador, Sir George Buchanan, who knew about an assassination attempt before it happened, and the Emperor Nicholas II of Russia, when Nicholas stated that he suspected "a young Englishman who had been a college friend of Prince Felix Yusupov, of having been concerned in Rasputin's murder ...". The second SIS officer in Petrograd at the time was Captain Stephen Alley, born at Arkhangelskoye Estate near Moscow in 1876, where his father was one of the prince's tutors. The archives of the MI6 do not hold a single document linking Rayner, Hoare, or any other British agent or diplomat to the murder. The only account of what went on in that basement room comes from Yusupov, and he changed his story several times. Perhaps some women were invited but Yusupov did not mention their names.

Confirmation that Rayner met with Yusupov (along with another officer, Captain John Scale) in the weeks leading up to the killing can be found in the diary of their chauffeur, William Compton, who recorded all visits. The last entry was made on the night after the murder. Compton said that "it is a little-known fact that Rasputin was shot not by a Russian but by an Englishman" and indicated that the culprit was a lawyer from the same part of the country as Compton himself. There is little doubt that Rayner was born some ten miles from Compton's hometown.

Evidence that the attempt had not gone quite according to plan is hinted at in a letter which Alley wrote to Scale eight days after the murder: "Although matters here have not proceeded entirely to plan, our objective has clearly been achieved. ... a few awkward questions have already been asked about wider involvement. Rayner is attending to loose ends and will no doubt brief you."

On his return to England, Oswald Rayner not only confided to his cousin, Rose Jones, that he had been present at Rasputin's murder but also showed family members a bullet which he claimed to have acquired at the murder scene. "Additionally, Oswald Rayner translated Yusupov’s first book on the murder of the peasant, sparking an interesting possibility that the pair may have shaped the story to suit their own ends."

Newspaper reporter Michael Smith suggested that British Secret Intelligence Bureau head Mansfield Cumming ordered three of his agents in Russia to eliminate Rasputin in December 1916. Hoare sent a cable to inform him about the matter. No list of any Scotland Yard agents operating in Russia was forthcoming, for there had never been any. According to Sir Samuel Hoare: "If MI6 had a part in the killing of Rasputin, I would have expected to have found some trace of that". "Hoare later came to the realization that in the days after the murder, Russian "rightists" had been trying to frame the British for the crime, and him, in particular. Hoare, Rayner, and presumably the rest of the mission, knew of the plot ...

In 1934 he compiled an English translation of Yusupov's book, Rasputin; His Malignant Influence and His Assassination. He named his only son, John Felix Rayner, after Yusupov. Conclusive evidence is unattainable, however, as Rayner burned all his papers before he died in 1961 and his only son also died four years later.

== Sources ==
- Buchanan, George (1923). My mission to Russia and other diplomatic memories. Cassell and Co., Ltd., London, New York. OL 6656274M.
- Fuhrmann, Joseph T. (2013). Rasputin: The Untold Story (illustrated ed.). Hoboken, New Jersey: John Wiley & Sons, Inc. ISBN 978-1-118-17276-6.
- Moe, Ronald C. (2011). Prelude to the Revolution: The Murder of Rasputin. Aventine Press. ISBN 978-1593307127.
- Nelipa, Margarita (2010). The Murder of Grigorii Rasputin: A Conspiracy That Brought Down the Russian Empire. Gilbert's Books. ISBN 978-0-9865310-1-9.
- Smith, Douglas (2016). Rasputin. MacMillan, London.
