= Johan Alfred Ander =

Swedish murderer and the last person to be executed in the country

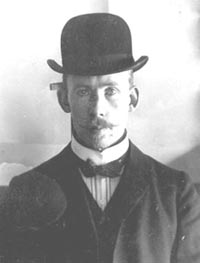
- Johan Alfred Ander
- Born: 27 November 1873; Ljusterö, Sweden
- Died: 23 November 1910 (aged 36); Långholmen Prison, Stockholm, Sweden
- Known for: Last person executed in Sweden
- Status: Executed by guillotine
- Conviction: Murder
- Penalty: Death

Johan Alfred Andersson Ander (27 November 1873 – 23 November 1910) was a convicted Swedish murderer and the last person to be executed in Sweden.

The only person to be executed in Sweden following the instatement of the guillotine, he remains the only person executed by this means in Swedish history (before 1907, capital punishment was executed through manual beheading).

== Early life ==
Born in Ljusterö, Ander performed his military service duties from 1893 to 1894 at the Vaxholm Artillery Corps of Vaxholm. When his military service was over, he got married and tried to make a living as a waiter and hotel owner. Most of the businesses failed however (both in Strängnäs in 1898 and in Helsinki in 1903). There have been claims that Ander's excessive drinking and mistreatment of his wife were, at least partially, the reasons for the economic failures. In 1900, he was imprisoned for a few small crimes but managed to escape. In all, by the time of his final conviction, he had been sentenced three times for theft (tredje resan stöld). In 1909, the couple moved back to Ander's parents' house in Karlsudd.

== Robbery and arrest ==
Ander sought a way to find a solution to his money problems, and for weeks he had been seen observing an exchange agency, Gerells Växelkontor (Eng.: Gerell's Exchange Office) on Malmtorgsgatan 3 in Stockholm. On 5 January 1910, he robbed the agency and beat the clerk, Victoria Hellsten, so severely that she died. He managed to steal 6,000 Swedish kronor in Swedish and foreign notes at the agency (around 275000 SEK in 2025 equivalent).

Staff at a hotel named Temperance, which was located near the exchange agency, reported to the police that one of their guests had been behaving in a very strange and anxious manner, and that this guest had left the hotel with an oblong package. The guest turned out to be Alfred Ander. A large suitcase found in his hotel room contained numerous items that could be connected to the murder, among them the murdered clerk's wallet as well as most of the stolen money, partially blood-stained.

Ander was subsequently arrested during nighttime near Vaxholm, in his father's house, after some inquiries to workers on the archipelago ferries, who recognized Ander and remembered where he went. The oblong package which had been observed by hotel staff was also found during the arrest and contained the apparent murder weapon, a steelyard balance.

== Trial and execution ==
During the trial, Ander claimed that he had received the money from a foreign (and unknown) man, whom he had met during his stay at a hotel in Stockholm. He never admitted to the crime, but was sentenced to death by all court instances, and he never appealed to the King to be reprieved (however, an application for clemency was made by his father). Clemency was refused by King Gustaf V, thus making Ander the first person to be executed in Sweden in almost ten years. The execution took place at Långholmen Prison in Stockholm on 23 November 1910 by a new guillotine imported from France, the only instance in which it was used in Sweden.

Ander appeared mostly calm during the execution, even greeting the execution team with "God morgon, mina herrar!" ("Good morning, gentlemen!") He also asked to say a few last words, but was, surprisingly, denied to do so by the executioner. Shortly thereafter, Ander was ordered to lie down on the guillotine, to which he complied without any need for force. The rope was then pulled. Ander reportedly shuddered just before his head fell into the zinc bucket fastened onto the guillotine. It was the first execution in Sweden in more than a decade, and the last ever to be carried out.

Ander's body was donated to science. Doctors concluded that, at the time of his death, he suffered from tuberculosis, and they also found a large chunk of porcelain in his stomach, likely from an in-prison suicide attempt prior to the execution.

The executioner was Albert Gustaf Dahlman, thus the last official executioner to carry out his duties. His death in 1920 was considered levying the pressure to abolish capital punishment in Sweden, which took place the following year. A further 10 to 15 people were sentenced to death but either committed suicide or were reprieved; the most notorious being Hilda Nilsson in 1917 and Mohammed Beck Hadjetlaché in 1920, respectively. The last woman to have been executed in Sweden was Anna Månsdotter, who was beheaded using an executioner's axe in 1890, also by Albert Gustaf Dahlman.

== See also ==
- Capital punishment in Sweden
- Historical murders and executions in Stockholm
