= Yngsjö =

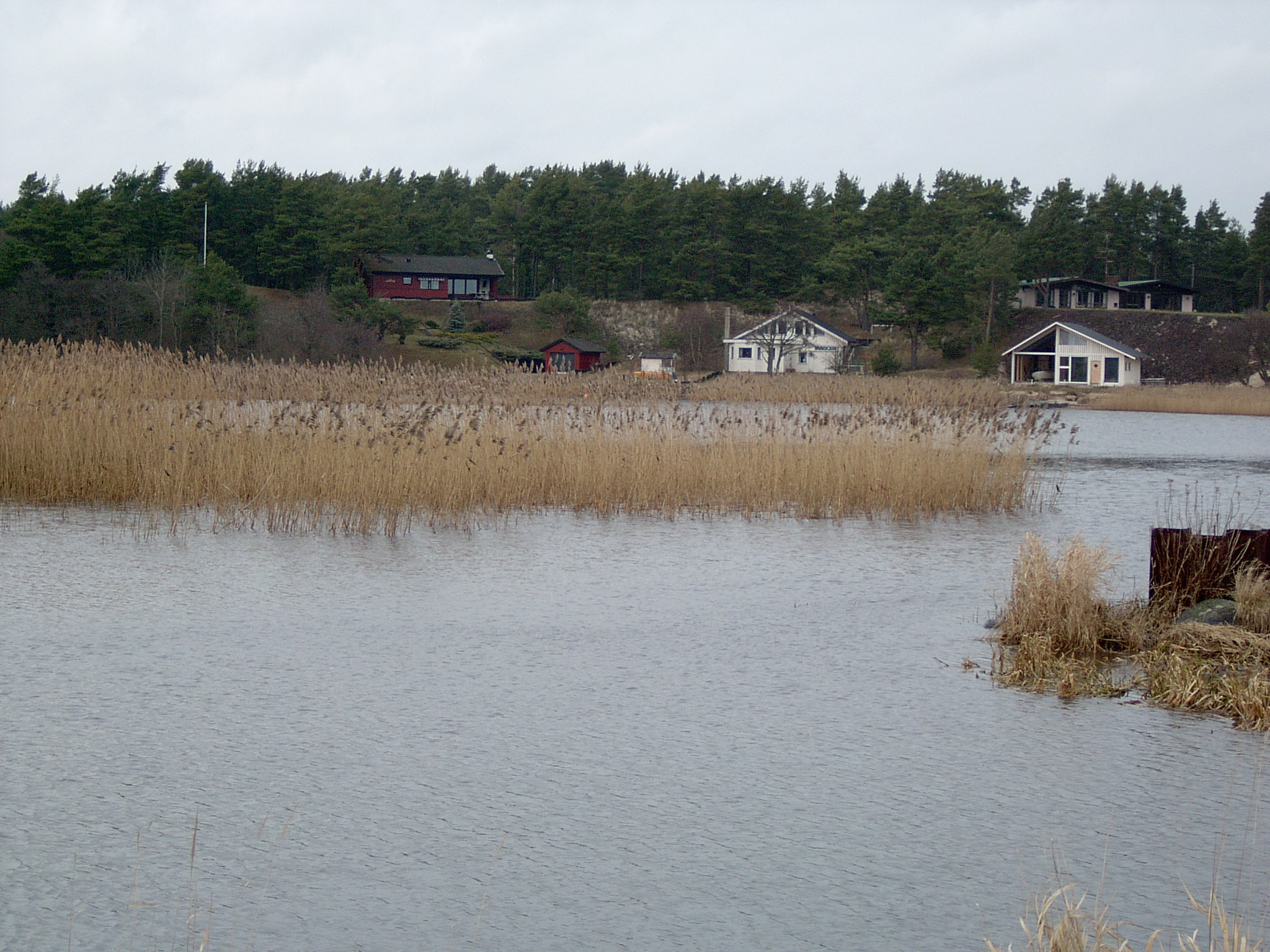
- On the coast of Yngsjö

- Location within Skåne Location within Sweden
- Coordinates: 55°52′N 14°13′E
- Country: Sweden
- Province: Skåne
- County: Skåne County
- Municipality: Kristianstad Municipality

Area
  - Total: 0.46 km^{2} (0.18 sq mi)

Population (31 December 2010)
  - Total: 302
  - Density: 652/km^{2} (1,690/sq mi)
- Time zone: UTC+1 (CET)
  - Summer (DST): UTC+2 (CEST)

Yngsjö is a locality situated in Kristianstad Municipality, Skåne County, Sweden with 302 inhabitants in 2010.

Yngsjö is located on the coast of the Baltic Sea and is famous for its beaches.

Yngsjö is also known for the manufacturer Malmberg and for the Yngsjö murder that took place in 1889 and resulted in the last execution of a woman in Sweden. The place also has a small sports club: Yngsjö Idrottsföring (YIF). Nearby is the (very) small lake Yngsjösjön and the bird watching point. Since 1996 there has also been a professional theater group, the Teater Nostra.
