= Albert Gustaf Dahlman =

Swedish executioner (1848–1920)

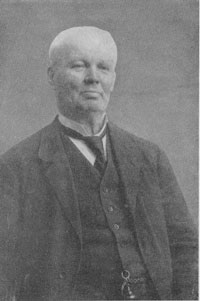
- Born: 17 February 1848; Sweden
- Died: 30 July 1920 (aged 72)
- Occupation: Executioner
- Known for: Last active executioner of Sweden

Albert Gustaf Dahlman (born Anders Gustaf Dalman; 17 February 1848 – 30 July 1920) was a Swedish executioner. He was the last executioner in Sweden, as well as the last to carry out capital punishment in Sweden (of Alfred Ander in 1910), the last by means of beheading by hand (in 1900), and the last to execute a woman (in 1890, his first).

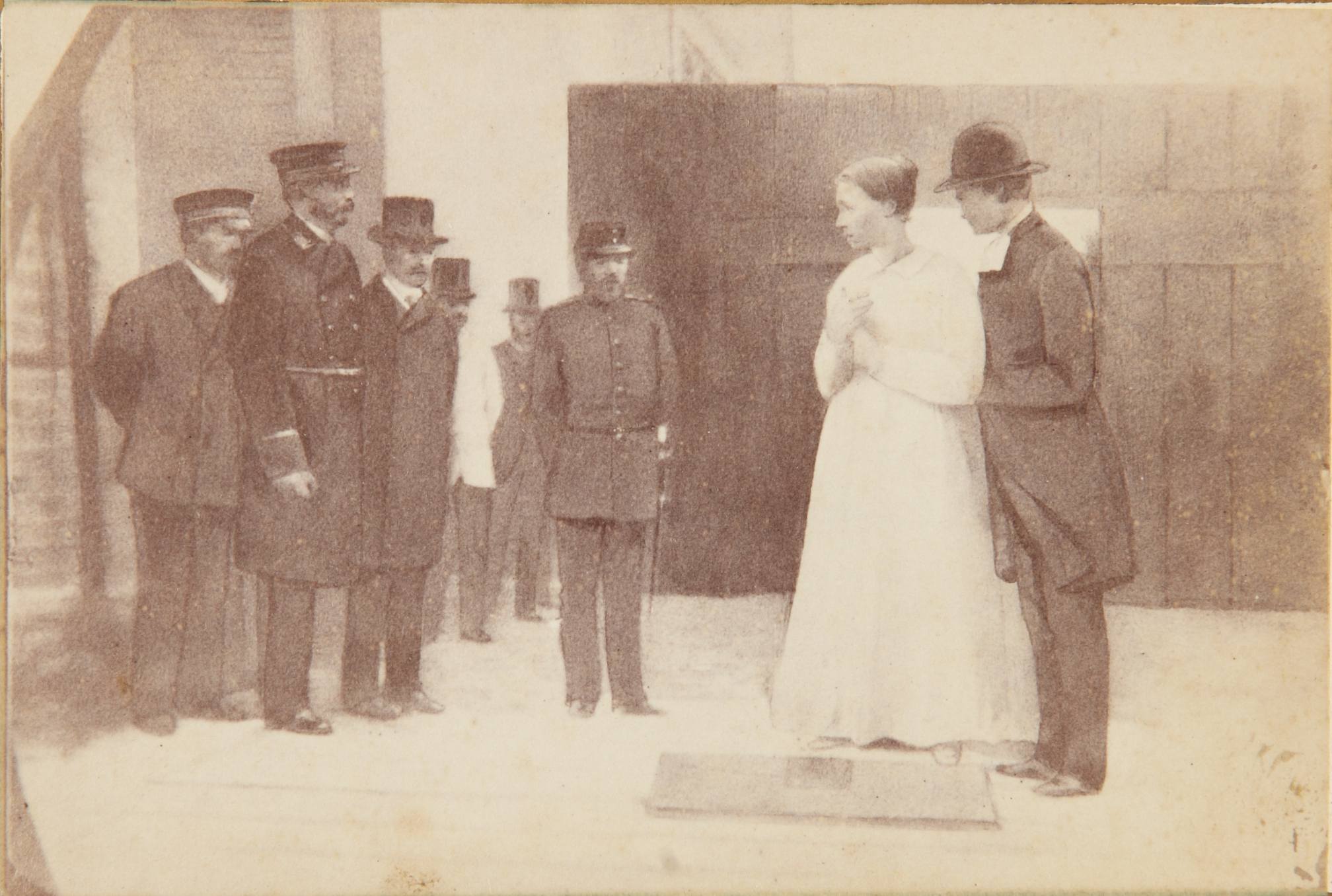
Dalman (far left) during the execution of Anna Månsdotter in August 1890

After a military career (he was stationed with Västmanlands regiment and reached the rank of corporal), Dahlman was selected for the position of executioner for the capital Stockholm from 200 applicants on 5 August 1885. From 1887 he was the sole executioner in the country, after Per Petter Christiansson Steineck had emigrated to the United States.

Dahlman carried out the last six executions in Sweden, five with the axe and the last one with the guillotine.

- 7 August 1890 – execution of Anna Månsdotter in Kristianstad.
- 17 March 1893 – execution of Per Johan Pettersson in Gävle.
- 5 July 1900 – execution of Julius Sallrot in Karlskrona.
- 23 August 1900 – execution of Lars Nilsson in Malmö.
- 10 December 1900 – execution of John Filip Nordlund in Västerås. This was the last execution in Sweden using an axe.
- 23 November 1910 – execution of Johan Alfred Ander in Stockholm.

During the final ten years of his tenure as executioner in Sweden he carried out no executions.

After being run over by a tram, he never regained health and was cared for by his son during his last years of life. He died on 30 July 1920. Dahlman was buried at Norra begravningsplatsen in Stockholm.

In the year after his death, capital punishment was abolished in Sweden for crimes committed during peace. In 1973 it was abolished for crimes committed during war.
