= Stephen Alley =

British engineer and MI6 agent

Stephen Alley MC
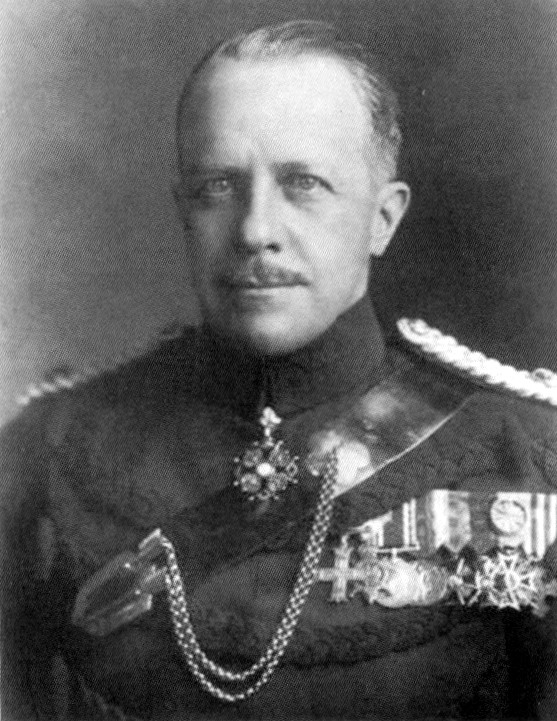
- Born: 14 February 1876; House of Yusupov Palace, Moscow, Russia
- Died: 1969 (aged 92–93); Ware, Hertfordshire
- Known for: MI6 agent; Alleged involvement in the murder of Rasputin; Proven involvement in a plan to try to rescue the Russian Imperial Family, the Romanovs, imprisoned in Ipatiev House in 1918 by the Bolsheviks

Captain Stephen Alley MC (14 February 1876 – 1969) was a British mechanical engineer and Secret Intelligence Service (MI6) agent in pre-revolutionary Russia who may have had an involvement in the murder of Rasputin in 1916 and in a plan to try to rescue the Russian Imperial Family, the Romanovs, imprisoned in Ipatiev House in 1918 by the Bolsheviks.

== Early life ==
Stephen Alley was born on 14 February 1876 at Arkhangelskoye Estate near Moscow. After being educated in Russia he attended King's College London where he studied English Literature, and later moved to Glasgow University where he took a degree in engineering.

He was commissioned a second-lieutenant in the Surrey Yeomanry on 18 October 1902.

== Career ==
After university he joined the family firm of Alley & McLellan Engineers in London. In 1910 he returned to Russia, where he helped build the first heavy oil pipeline to the Black Sea. He became experienced in building rail transport. He is noted by many authors and documentaries for alleged involvement in the murder of Grigori Rasputin whilst working for the British Military Control Office in Saint Petersburg. Alley was alleged to be the author of a letter to John Scale on 25 December 1916 that, if authentic, is claimed by BBC History to be "the best proof of British involvement in Rasputin's murder." Stephen Alley participated in a plan to try to rescue the Russian Imperial Family, the Romanovs, imprisoned in the Ipatiev House in 1918 by the Bolsheviks. The plan did not work out.

== Death ==
Alley died in 1969.
