= Mohammed Beck Hadjetlaché =

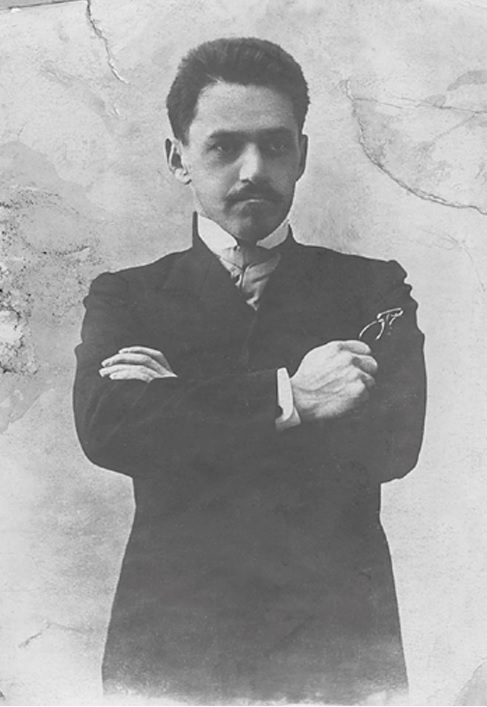
Hadjetlaché in 1907

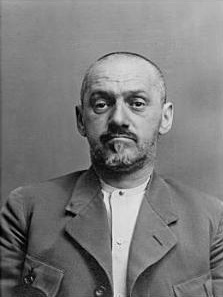
Hadjetlaché

Mohammed Beck Hadjetlaché (20 May 1868, Istanbul - 4 November 1929, Stockholm) was a Circassian journalist, writer, MI6 (SIS) agent, and anti-communist white movement terrorist. Hadjetlaché used many assumed identities, but his real name was likely Kasi Beck Akhmetukov.

Hadjetlaché is mostly remembered for the series of three murders he committed in the Stockholm area. The victims were accused of being Bolshevik agents. Hadjetlaché was sentenced to death for these murders in 1920. This was the last death sentence passed on any person in Sweden. After his death sentence was commuted to life in prison, Hadjetlaché died in prison in 1929.

== Biography ==
Kasi Beck Akhmetukov was born in Istanbul in a Circassian family, which fled from Circassia after the Russian-Circassian War. In 1878 his father, a Bashi-bazouk leader, was killed in the Russo-Turkish War (1877–1878). In 1882 he emigrated to Russia, and was adopted by the childless Ettinger family and called Grigory. In 1890s he wrote and published several novels and short stories under the pen name Hadjetlaché.

In 1916 Hadjetlaché offered to run an "anti-German and anti-Turkish propaganda campaign among the Moslems on a worldwide scale" for the Russian government and asked for money. In 1917 he was recruited by what was then MI1c while working at a British propaganda unit called the Anglo-Russian Commission in St Petersburg. He was being run as an agent by Captain John Dymoke Scale.

He left Soviet Russia and went to Sweden in 1918, where he organized a White Terrorist cell called the "Russian League", which planned to help in the counter revolutionary struggle against the Bolsheviks with Stockholm as its base. Hadjetlaché purchased a house in the woods outside of Stockholm. He and his gang brought people, whom they accused of being Bolshevik agents, to the house, where they were killed and had their bodies were then dropped in a nearby lake. When the police discovered the gang in 1919, three bodies were found in the Norrviken lake. The confirmed victims were engineer Karl Calvé (originally possibly Gleb Varfolomeyev), journalist and Soviet diplomatic courier Juri Levi (Paul) Levitsky and nobleman Nicolai Ardachev, a doctor in law. According to Hadjetlaché's own "death list" it is likely that more people had been killed.

The murders were exploited for propaganda purposes by the Soviet press. Soviet writer Alexei Tolstoi included it in his novel "Emigrants".

Hadjetlaché was sentenced to death on 28 May 1920 by guillotine, later converted to life in accordance with the de facto moratorium persisting before abolition the next year. He died in 1929 in Långholmen Prison, shortly after a failed application for commutation to time served. He was the last person to be sentenced to death in Sweden, although the capital punishment remained in military law until 1972. Hadjetlaché's accomplices received prison terms ranging from six months to 8 years.

Carl Sandburg wrote a poem about Hadjetlaché under the title "Mohammed Bek Hadjetlaché." It is written as if Sandburg had personally met Mohammed Beck Hadjetlaché.

== Sources ==
- Lundberg, Svante. Ryssligan (2004). ISBN 91-89116-53-4
- Fonds Mahomet-Beck Hadjetlache
- О кази-беке Ахметукове (Магомкд-Бек Хаджетлаше) и его потомках
- Nordisk Familjebok pages 191-192
- (Государственный архив Российской Федерации (ГАРФ), Ф.102, ДП ОО; C. Kumuk, Düvel-i Muazzama’nın Kıskacında Kafkasya Dağlıları, Istanbul, 2022, p. 168)
