= Wendela Gustafva Sparre =

Swedish artist (1772–1855)

- Born: December 14, 1772
- Died: May 7, 1855 (aged 82)
- Known for: Embroidery
- Spouse: Axel Oxenstierna (m. 1801)

Wendela Gustafva Sparre af Rossvik (December 14, 1772 – May 7, 1855) was a Swedish textile artist. She was a member of the Royal Swedish Academy of Arts. She managed the Harg ironworks in Uppland between 1816 and 1827.

== Life ==
Sparre was born at Långdunker manor in Hyltinge parish in Södermanland to the noble Gabriel Sparre af Rossvik, captain of the royal regiment of Prince Frederick Adolf of Sweden, and Maria Vendela Ulfsparre af Broxvik. On 15 October 1801, she married the nobleman and royal equerry Axel Oxenstierna (1743-1816), with whom she had a son, Carl Gabriel Oxenstierna (1802-1873).

After her marriage Sparre spent the majority of her life on her husband's estate, the Hargs ironworks in Uppland. She nursed her son, who was in poor health during his childhood. When she was widowed in 1816, she managed the Harg ironworks until the maturity of her son (that is, in 1827, when her son reached the age of 25 and thus reached his majority).

Wendela Gustafva Sparre was known and acknowledged as a non-professional artist within silk embroidery. In 1797, she participated in the art exhibition of the academy with a work depicting a "Landscape of the South". The same year, she was elected to the Swedish Royal Academy of Arts. Her best known work is Flodlandskap ('Riverside') from 1796.
