= Anglo-Russian Commission =

The Anglo-Russia Commission was an office of the British Department of Information established in Saint Petersburg in 1915 that was involved in arranging war supplies from the United Kingdom to Russia.

It was tasked with "propaganda distribution, use of literature and art therefore, political intelligence, and, as agent for the War Office, the dissemination of military news to non-military and non-Dominion authorities"

The office was closed in the early days of March 1918 when it was reported to have "left British propaganda in Russia almost at a standstill".
