= Nya Smedjegården =

Coordinates: 59.3361°N 18.0558°E

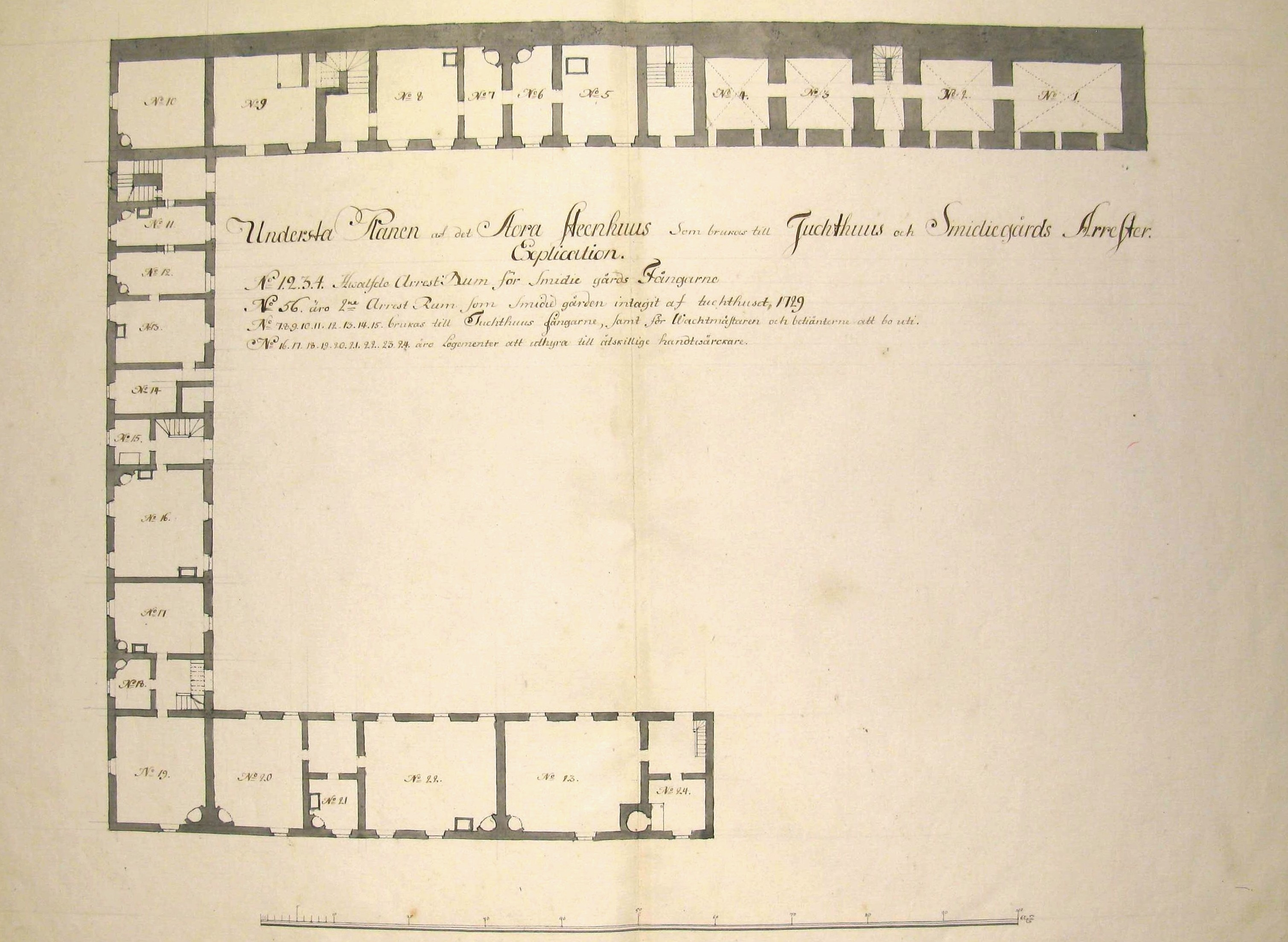
Drawing of the building (ground floor, prison part), first half of 18th century: 6 cells in the upper wing are for "smithy prisoners", 9 cells, for correction house inmates and guards "to live in", 9 workshops in the lower half, for artisans "to rent"

Smedjegården (literally: "Blacksmiths' Yard"), initially Nya Smedjegården ("New Blacksmiths' Yard"), was a prison in Stockholm, in use between 1636 and 1896.

The name was derived from a prison, similarly known as Smedjegården, in the dungeons of the royal castle Tre Kronor, in use until the castle was destroyed by fire in 1697. There the prisoners were made to labor in the castle's smithy.

The Nya smedjegården was founded in 1636 at the street Drottninggatan in Stockholm. From 1664 onward, it was the site for prisoners awaiting death penalty in Stockholm. The building housed also a house of correction, an infamous torture chamber (Rosenkammaren), until the abolition of torture in 1772, and an orphanage (Allmänna Barnhuset) until 1886.

Until 1849, the prison was used for both male and female prisoners—normally not kept separate from each other. Then Smedjegården was transformed into a women's prison. The institution was replaced in the 1890s, and the building demolished. On the site, Stockholm's People's House was erected.
