= Rosenkammaren =

Coordinates: 59.3361°N 18.0558°E

Rosenkammaren (literally: 'The Rose Chamber') was a torture chamber in the prison Nya smedjegården in Stockholm until its closure in 1772.

It consisted of a long room, flooded with knee deep water from a spring. The prisoners sentenced to be tortured were chained by a hook from the ceiling in the knee deep water, which was normally icy cold.

On 27 September 1772, torture was abolished by Gustav III of Sweden, and the Rose Chamber, along with the other torture chamber in the capital, Tjuvakällaren ("Thief Cellar") in the Town Hall (active 1471-1772), was closed and its equipment destroyed.
