= Per Petter Christiansson Steineck =

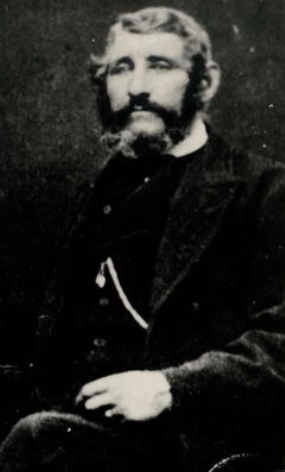
Image of Per Petter

Per Petter Christiansson Steineck, also Per Petter Christensson Steijnech (born 10 July 1822) was a Swedish executioner.

== Career ==
Steineck was born in Malmö, Sweden. He became an executioner in 1861. Between 1864 and 1887, he performed six executions. Steineck carried out one of the two last public executions in Sweden and is infamous for that. On the 18 May 1876 he executed Konrad Petterson Lundqvist Tector (1838–1876) for murder in Stenkumla on Gotland. Steineck made a poor job of the execution. He failed to kill Tector with the first strike (actually taking two more strikes to sever the head from the body), and is alleged to have been drunk during the execution.

A Gotland newspaper wrote: "...the executioner Steineck took hold of the broadaxe, and after Tector's position had been slightly different, he raised the broadax... It fell, death appeared to have followed immediately, but the blow was – obliquely. Yet another must be made; this one hit better, but for the third time, the broadax must be raised and lowered, before the head was completely separated from the torso..."

After the execution of Tector he was enlisted to carry out one more execution, that of the Glimminge killer (Glimmingemördaren), Nils Peter Hagström, (1853–1887) on the 29 March 1887 in Kristianstad, in Skåne County.

Three months later he emigrated to the United States with his wife. The couple emigrated from Kristina parish, Jönköping County through the Port of Gothenburg to New York City. Their sons had already emigrated to the United States.

== Media portrayals ==
Drömmen om Amerika or The dream of America is translated in to English, is a Swedish film from 1976, depicts the events of the last public executions in Sweden.
