= Yngsjö murder =

Homicide in Sweden (1889)

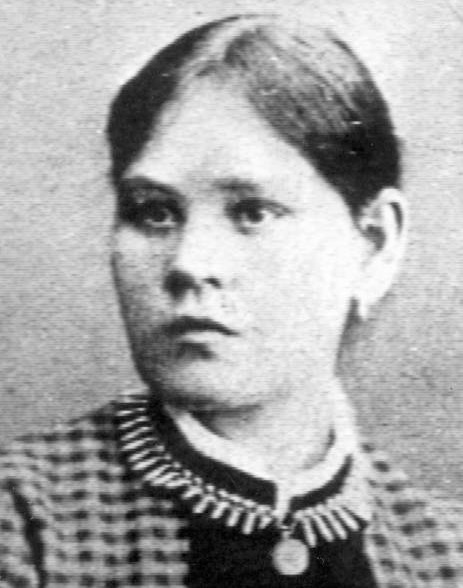
Hanna Johansdotter

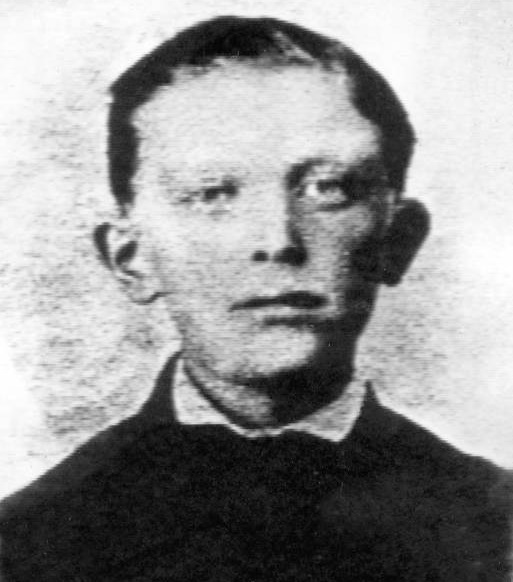
Per Nilsson

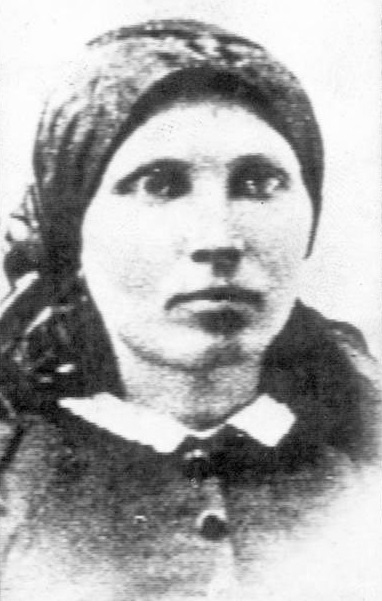
Anna Månsdotter

The victim (left) and her assailants – the husband (center) and mother-in-law (right).

The Yngsjö murder is the common name of one of Sweden's most notorious murder cases, which occurred on 28 March 1889, in Yngsjö, Skåne.

== Background ==
Anna Månsdotter was born in a village near Kristianstad in southern Sweden on 28 December 1841.

She married a farmer Nils Nilsson (b. 1828) and moved to a simple farmhouse on the edge of a village on the Baltic Sea. They had three children but only one survived into adulthood. The farm got into financial difficulties and Nils became ill. He died in 1883 leaving her with her 21-year-old son Per Nilsson to run the farm.

Partly to quell rumours of incest between mother and son she organised for Per to marry Hanna Johansdotter (b. 1867), from a neighbouring village, and daughter of Johan Olson, a district judge, and his wife Hanna Andersdotter. They married in 1887 and Hanna moved into the farmhouse with Per. Anna had said she would move out but this never happened. The relationship between the two women was not good. Per seemed totally under his mother's control.

Hanna wrote to her parents expressing her unhappiness and desire to leave.

== Events ==
The death mask of Anna Månsdotter

On 28 March 1889 a neighbour came to the farmhouse to ask about Hanna. Per said she had gone out. The trapdoor to the cellar was open, the neighbour saw Hanna dead at the foot of the steps. Per showed no emotion. The neighbour went to get help. They moved the body to the ground floor bedroom. They fetched a priest. They noted she was not fully dressed and had bruising on her throat. An autopsy concluded death was by strangulation. Anna and Per were arrested and questioned. Per eventually confessed, but police considered Anna as the likely instigator.

Hanna's father showed her letters to the police and these certainly pointed to both mother and son having something against her, mother more than son. Anna later admitted the crime, but this seemed to be to divert blame from Per and the two stories were contradictory, each wishing to take sole blame. Both were charged with murder and with incest.

Both perpetrators were initially sentenced to death for the murder, but Per Nilsson's sentence was converted into life imprisonment. Anna was held at Kristianstad Prison and was beheaded in the prison courtyard on 7 August 1890 – the first execution of a woman in Sweden in 30 years. She was 48 years old when executed.

Månsdotter thus became the last woman in Sweden to be executed.

== Aftermath ==
The murder was not only notable because of the deed itself, but also because it was revealed that the mother and son had an incestuous relationship. Anna Månsdotter was beheaded by axe on the district jail grounds in Kristianstad on 7 August 1890, by executioner Albert Gustaf Dahlman. Per Nilsson was pardoned from his death sentence and was instead sentenced to hard labour for the rest of his life. He was however released in 1913 and died in 1918.

== In media ==
The Yngsjö murder has been portrayed in numerous films and books over the years:

- In 1966, a full-length feature film, Woman of Darkness, was released. It was directed by Arne Mattsson and stars Gösta Ekman (as Per Nilsson), Gunnel Lindblom (as Anna Månsdotter) and Christina Schollin (as Hanna Johansdotter).
- In 1986, a television film, Yngsjömordet, part of the miniseries Skånska mord, was released. It was directed by Richard Hobert and stars Christian Fex (as Per Nilsson), Mimmo Wåhlander (as Anna Månsdotter) and Kajsa Reingardt (as Hanna Johansdotter).
