= Långholmen Prison =

Former prison in Stockholm, Sweden

Coordinates: 59°19′15″N 18°01′34″E

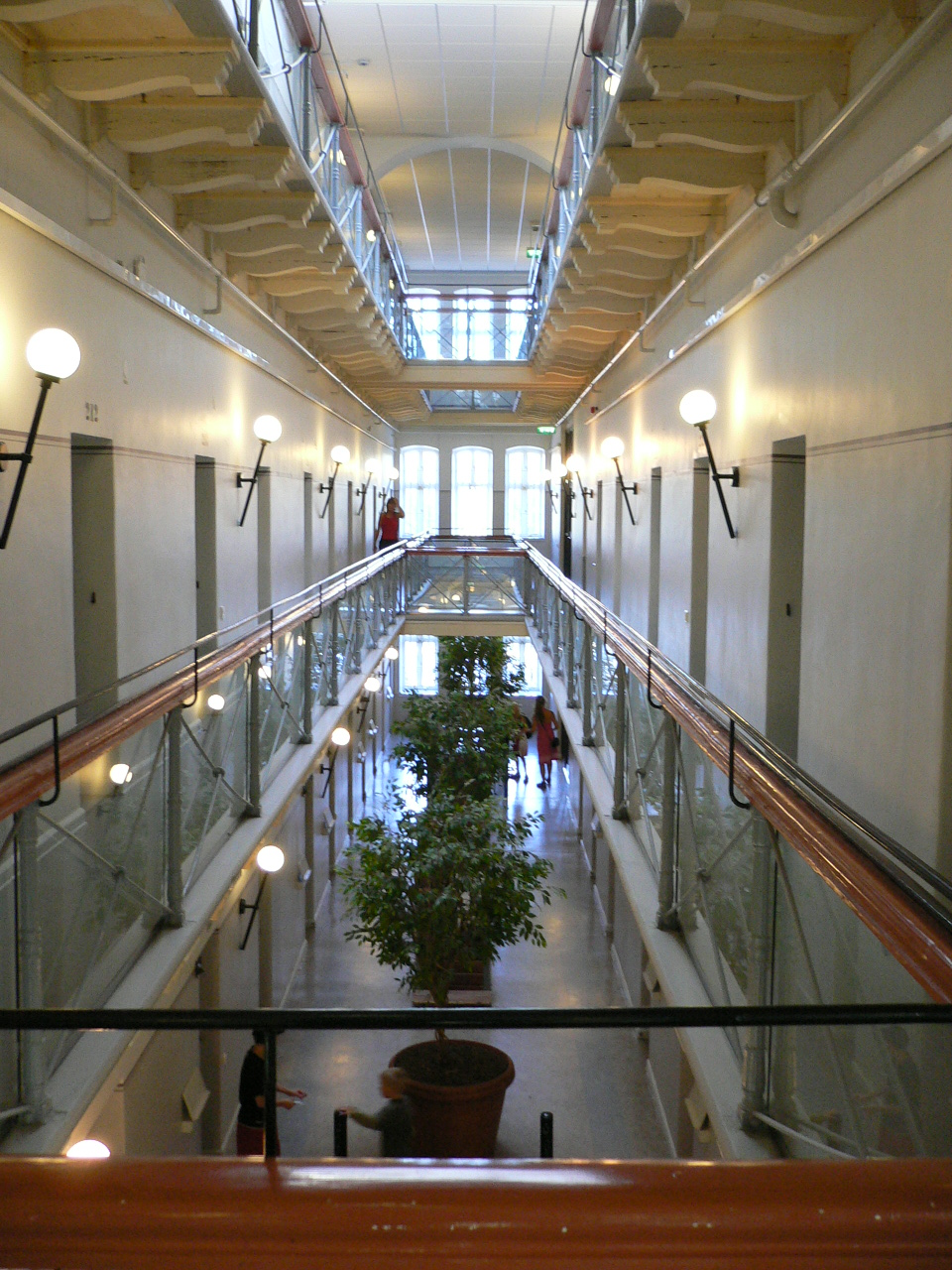
- The former prison in July 2006
- Interactive map of Långholmen Prison
- Location: Stockholm, Sweden
- Population: 500
- Opened: 1880
- Closed: 1975

Långholmen Prison, officially Långholmen Central Prison (Swedish: Långholmens centralfängelse), was historically one of the largest prison facilities in Sweden with more than 500 cells, located on the island of Långholmen in Stockholm. It was built 1874—1880 as the central prison of Sweden, and was temporary closed down between 1972–1975. Afterwards, Långholmens spinnhus was moved. Today the building is being used as a hotel/hostel and museum, as well as to accommodate a folk high school. Part of the prison was demolished in 1982. The prison is also noted for being the location of the last execution in Sweden, as well as the final confinement of the last prisoner sentenced to execution, prior to the abolition of capital punishment in 1921. The hostel was taken into usage in May 1989.

The island itself was originally rocky and barren, but in the 19th century, the prisoners were made to cover the island with mud dredged from the waterways around it. After a few years, the fertile soil had turned the island into a lush garden with a somewhat exotic flora compared to its surroundings, caused by various seeds accidentally brought and spread by the trade and merchant ships from other places and countries that passed by the island. This peculiarity still persists, and today the island is known as a lush oasis.

== Notable prisoners ==
- Barbro Alving
- Johan Alfred Ander
- Jan Guillou
- Mohammed Beck Hadjetlaché
- Zeth Höglund
- Ture Nerman
