= 1626 in Sweden =

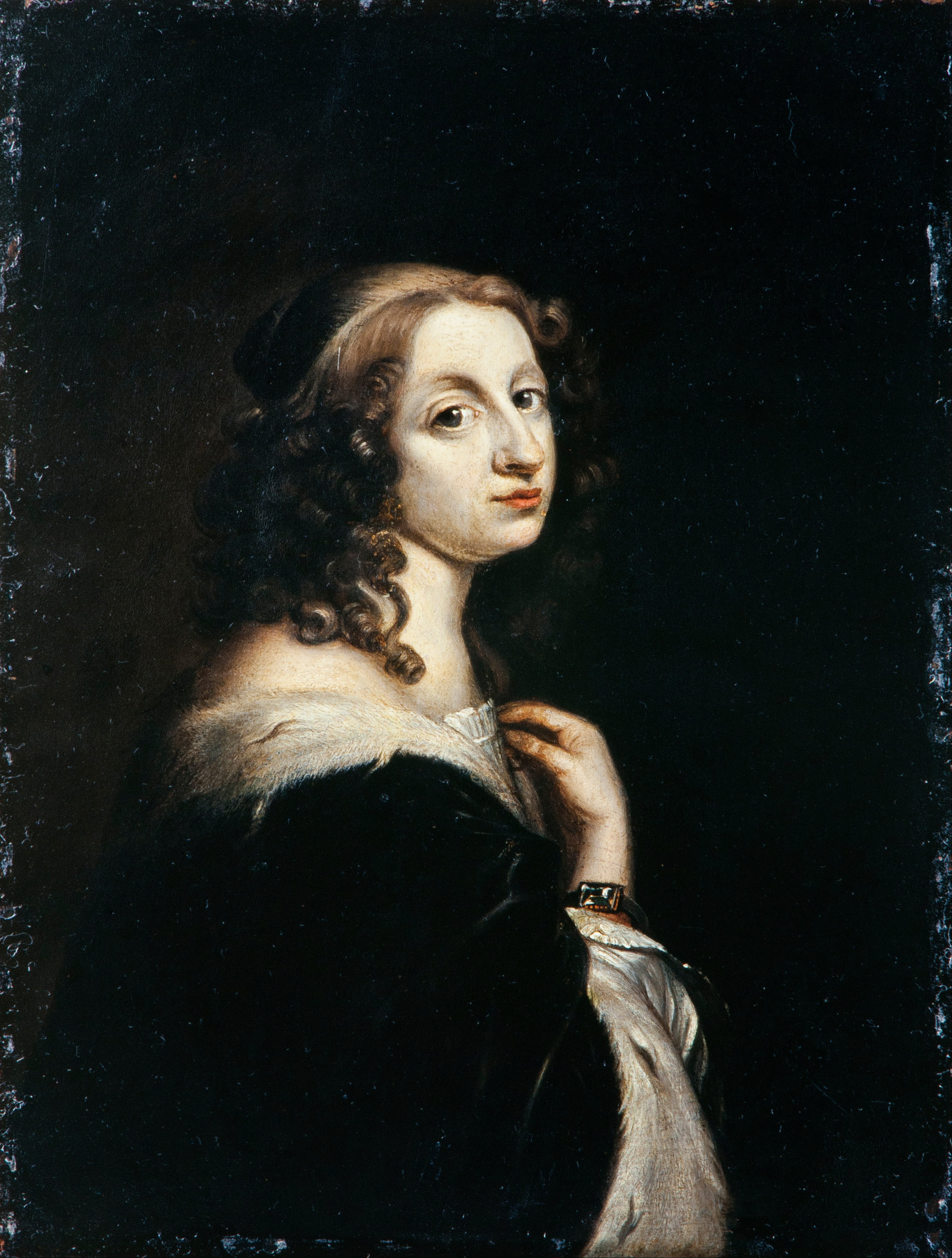
Christina, Queen of Sweden

Events from the year 1626 in Sweden

== Incumbents ==
- Monarch – Gustaf II Adolf

== Events ==
- 7 January – Swedish victory in the Battle of Wallhof
- May 1626 – Sweden invades Polish Prussia
- September-October – Swedish victory in the Battle of Gniew
- The visions of Margareta i Kumla attracts pilgrimages from all the nation.

== Births ==
- 19 April – Christina, Queen of Sweden, monarch (died 1689)
- 17 May – Countess Palatine Eleonora Catherine of Zweibrücken, princess (died 1692)
- 17 June – Johan Baazius the younger, archbishop (died 1681)
- Brita Rosladin, noblewoman (died 1675)

== Deaths ==
- 29 January – Ture Axelsson, Lord of Traneberg (born 1604)
- 31 October – Jonas Sigfridi Helsingius, priest and politician (born 1552)
- 1 November – Johannes Banck, priest (born 1571)
- Sven Eketrä, nobleman and governor (born c. 1562)
- Olaus Johannis Gestricius, priest (born 1558)
- Magnus Johannis, vicar (born 1578)
- Petrus Joannis Kerfstadius, priest and politician (born c. 1540)
- Sten Stenbock, baron and military officer (born c. 1548–1600)
