= 1675 in Sweden =

- Decades: 1650s; 1660s; 1670s; 1680s; 1690s
- See also: Other events of 1675; Timeline of Swedish history

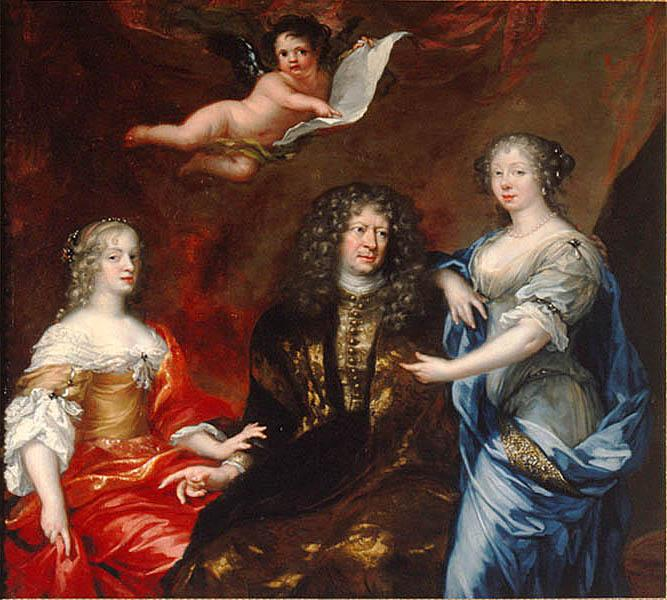
Bengt Horn

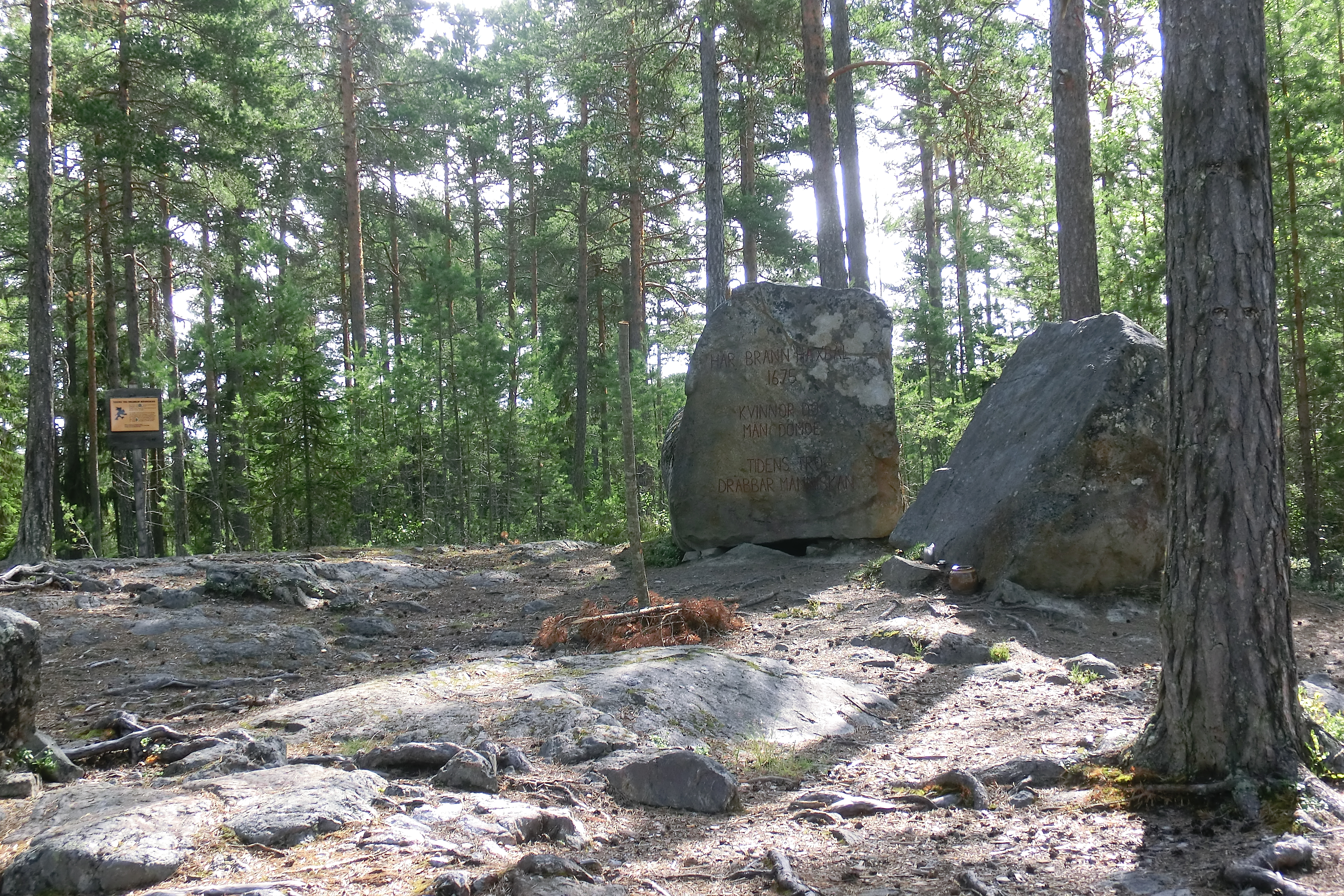
The memorial stone of the Torsåker witch trials from 1675.

Events from the year 1675 in Sweden

== Incumbents ==
- Monarch – Charles XI

== Events ==
- War between Sweden and the Netherlands.
- The King is engaged to Ulrika Eleonora of Denmark.
- June 18 - Battle of Fehrbellin
- War between Sweden and the Holy Roman Empire.
- Scanian War
- Coronation of the King.
- The King retracts the Court leet of the nobility.
- Law on the right to draft Romani males to military service.
- June - 71 people are executed in the Torsåker witch trials, the biggest witch trial in the history of the country.

== Births ==
- 27 January - Erik Benzelius the younger, librarian, theologian, and bishop. Died 1743.
- Born sometime around 1675 - Ingeborg Jonsdotter, married Olaus Persson and had 1 child, Per Olofsson. She died April 2, 1769.
- 27 February - Niklas Peter von Gedda, Baron (friherre) and diplomat, served as the Swedish ambassador to the Congress of Soissons and member of the Visby town council.
- 5 October - Gustaf Rålamb, Baron (friherre), Governor (landshövding) of Skaraborg County and book collector
- 2 December - Johan Abraham Lillie, officer in the Great Northern War, served with distinction in the battles of Helsingborg and Battle of Gadebusch. Was ennobled for his defence of New Älvsborg Fortress against Peter Tordenskjold.

== Deaths ==
- Margareta Beijer, managing director of the Swedish Post Office, Postverket from 1669 until 1673 (born 1625)
- Gertrud Svensdotter, notorious witch witness (born 1656)
- Brita Rosladin (born 1626)
