= 1625 in Sweden =

Events from the year 1625 in Sweden

== Incumbents ==
- Monarch – Gustaf II Adolf

== Events ==
- Great Stockholm Fire of 1625
- Second Phase of Polish–Swedish War started.

== Births ==
- 10 October - Erik Dahlbergh, engineer and field marshal (died 1703)
- Margareta Beijer, managing director of the Swedish post office (died 1675)
- Armegot Printz, colonial noblewoman (died 1695)

== Deaths ==
- 8 December - Christina of Holstein-Gottorp, queen consort (born 1573)
- 26 February - Anna Vasa, Princess (born 1568)
