= 1675 =

1675 in various calendars
- Gregorian calendar: 1675; MDCLXXV
- Ab urbe condita: 2428
- Armenian calendar: 1124; ԹՎ ՌՃԻԴ
- Assyrian calendar: 6425
- Balinese saka calendar: 1596–1597
- Bengali calendar: 1081–1082
- Berber calendar: 2625
- English Regnal year: 26 Cha. 2 – 27 Cha. 2
- Buddhist calendar: 2219
- Burmese calendar: 1037
- Byzantine calendar: 7183–7184
- Chinese calendar: 甲寅年 (Wood Tiger); 4372 or 4165 — to — 乙卯年 (Wood Rabbit); 4373 or 4166
- Coptic calendar: 1391–1392
- Discordian calendar: 2841
- Ethiopian calendar: 1667–1668
- Hebrew calendar: 5435–5436
- Hindu calendars
- Vikram Samvat: 1731–1732
- Shaka Samvat: 1596–1597
- Kali Yuga: 4775–4776
- Holocene calendar: 11675
- Igbo calendar: 675–676
- Iranian calendar: 1053–1054
- Islamic calendar: 1085–1086
- Japanese calendar: Enpō 3 (延宝３年)
- Javanese calendar: 1597–1598
- Julian calendar: Gregorian minus 10 days
- Korean calendar: 4008
- Minguo calendar: 237 before ROC 民前237年
- Nanakshahi calendar: 207
- Thai solar calendar: 2217–2218
- Tibetan calendar: ཤིང་ཕོ་སྟག་ལོ་ (male Wood-Tiger); 1801 or 1420 or 648 — to — ཤིང་མོ་ཡོས་ལོ་ (female Wood-Hare); 1802 or 1421 or 649

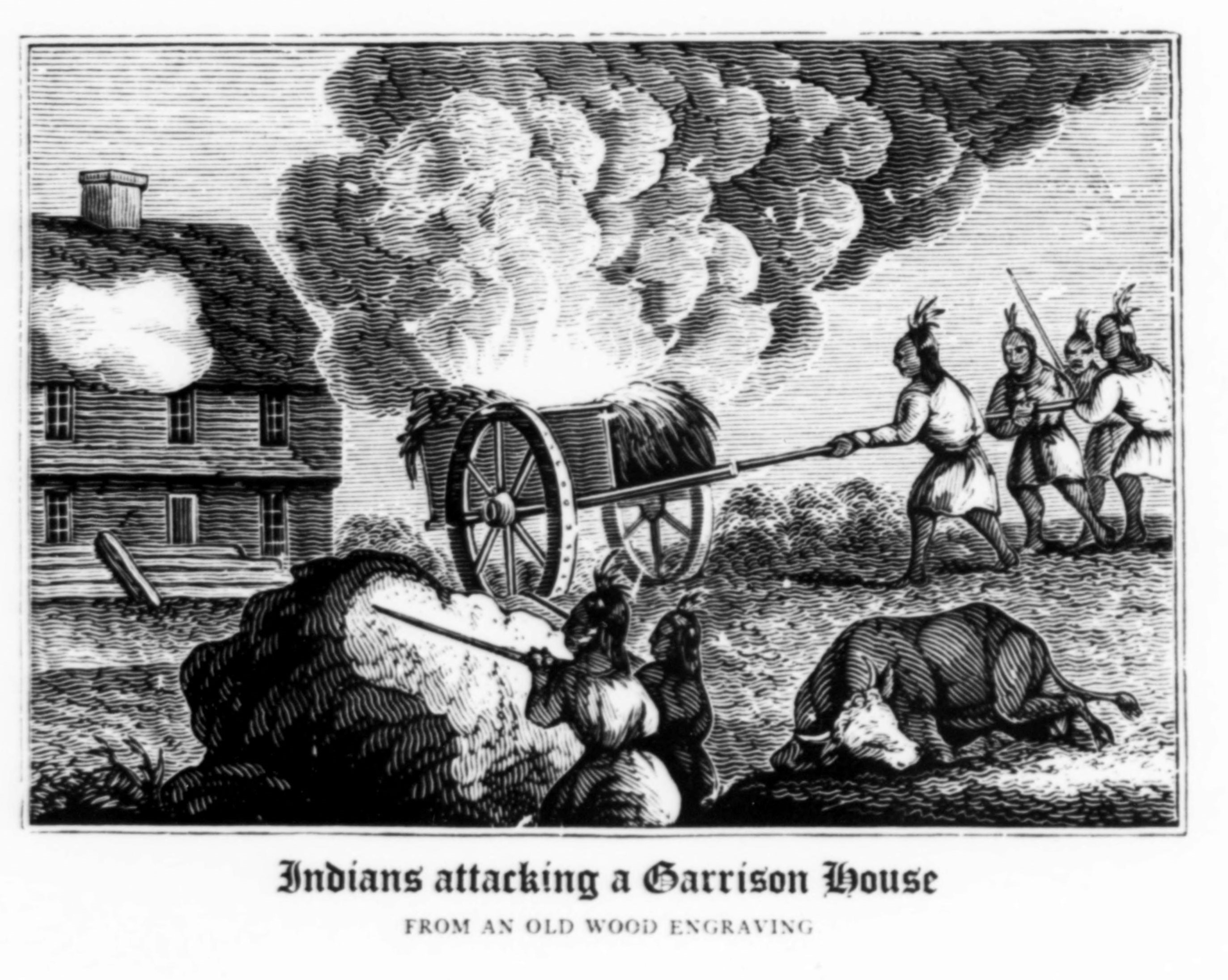
June 24: King Philip's War breaks out as the Wampanoag nation, led by Chief Metacomet, attacks English settlers in Massachusetts

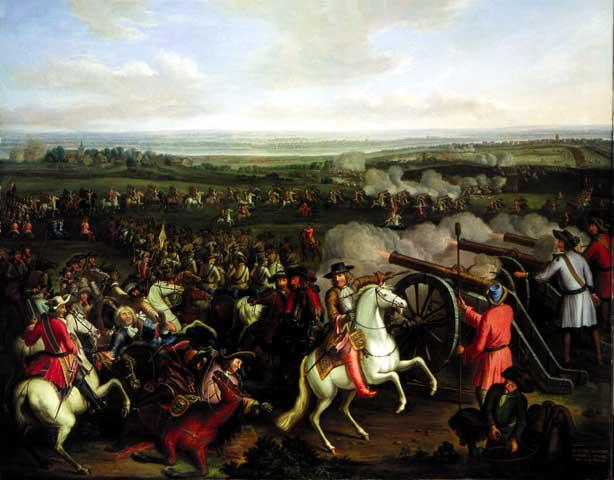
June 28: The Battle of Fehrbellin in Germany is won by Brandenburg over Sweden.

1675 (MDCLXXV) was a common year starting on Tuesday of the Gregorian calendar and a common year starting on Friday of the Julian calendar, the 1675th year of the Common Era (CE) and Anno Domini (AD) designations, the 675th year of the 2nd millennium, the 75th year of the 17th century, and the 6th year of the 1670s decade. As of the start of 1675, the Gregorian calendar was 10 days ahead of the Julian calendar, which remained in localized use until 1923.

== Events ==
=== January–March ===
- January 5 – Franco-Dutch War – Battle of Turckheim: The French defeat Austria and Brandenburg.
- January 29 – John Sassamon, an English-educated Native American Christian, dies at Assawampsett Pond, an event which will trigger a year-long war between the English American colonists of New England, and the Algonquian Native American tribes.
- February 4 – The Italian opera La divisione del mondo, by Giovanni Legrenzi, is performed for the first time, premiering in Venice at the Teatro San Luca. The new opera, telling the story of the "division of the world" after the battle between the Gods of Olympus and the Titans, becomes known for its elaborate and expensive sets, machinery, and special effects and is revived 325 years later in the year 2000.
- February 6 – Nicolò Sagredo is elected as the new Doge of Venice and leader of the Venetian Republic, replacing Domenico II Contarini, who had died 10 days earlier.
- February 11 – French Army Marshal Louis Victor de Rochechouart, Count of Vivonne, reinforces the rebels in the Messina revolt with eight additional warships and three fireships to bring to 20 the number of ships that France has against the 15 warships of Spain, and breaks the Spanish blockade that had prevented food from reaching Messina.
- February 25 – Netherlands scientist Christiaan Huygens files drawings of his invention of the balance spring, the key component to the accuracy of portable clocks and pocket watches, in a letter to the Journal des Sçavants.
- February 27 – Matthew Locke's "semi-opera" Psyche premieres at the Duke's Theatre in London.
- March 4 – John Flamsteed is appointed by King Charles II as England's "astronomical observator", in effect, becoming the first Astronomer Royal.
- March 25 – England's first royal yacht, HMY Mary, strikes rocks off of the coast of Anglesey while traveling from Dublin to Chester with 74 passengers and crew, and quickly sinks, with the loss of 35 people. The other 39 are able to get to safety. The wreckage is not discovered until almost 300 years later, on July 11, 1971.
- March 30 – The guild organisation Maîtresses couturières is founded in Paris.

=== April–June ===
- April 13 – King Charles II of England suspends Parliament after just nine weeks when the members refuse to vote additional funding to him.
- April 20 – An uprising by the Chahars in the Chinese Empire region of Inner Mongolia, led by brothers Abunai Khan and Lubuzung Khan with 3,000 followers, is harshly put down by Imperial troops of the Manchu dynasty. Survivors of the battle, part of the Revolt of the Three Feudatories, are put to death.
- April 27 – Lê Hy Tông becomes the new Emperor of Vietnam at the age of 12, after being appointed as a figurehead by the warlord Trịnh Tạc upon the death of Lê Gia Tông.
- April – English merchant Anthony de la Roché, blown off course after rounding Cape Horn eastabout, makes the first discovery of land south of the Antarctic Convergence, landing on South Georgia and (probably) Gough Island.
- May 6 – The Siege of Ponda, an action by the Maratha Empire in southern India against the Sultanate of Bijapur, ends after four weeks when the Mughal Empire fails to send reinforcements. Most of the defenders are massacred after Emperor Shivaji's troops storm the fortress in what is now a small city in the Indian state of Goa.
- May 15 – After an invasion and attempt to take over the German principality of Brandenburg, the army of Sweden makes its first conquest, forcing the surrender of the fortress at Löcknitz.
- May 18 – Misirliohlu Ibrahim Pasha becomes the new ruler of Tripolitania, a province of the Ottoman Empire at the time and now part of the North African nation of Libya. He reigns for 19 months as the Beylerbey of Tripoli.
- May 23 – Sujinphaa becomes the new figurehead monarch of the Ahom kingdom in northeastern India, enthroned at the capital at Garhgaon (now in the Indian state of Assam), after Gobar Roja is deposed and executed by order of the nobles who control the nation.
- June 1 – The Torsåker witch trials is concluded in Sweden with the execution of 71 people (65 of them women) executed on the same day at the village of Häxberget. The condemned prisoners are beheaded and their bodies are then burned.
- June 8 – John Sassamon's alleged murderers are executed at Plymouth, Massachusetts.
- June 11 – Armed Wampanoag warriors are reported traveling around Swansea, Massachusetts.
- June 14 – Colonial authorities of Rhode Island, Plymouth, and Massachusetts attempt a negotiation with Metacomet (King Philip), leader of the Wampanoags, and seek guarantees of fidelity from the Nipmuck and Narragansett tribes. The negotiations end after 11 days, closing on June 25.
- June 21 – Reconstruction of St Paul's Cathedral begins in London under the direction of Christopher Wren, to replace the portion destroyed by the Great Fire of London nine years earlier.
- June 24 – King Philip's War breaks out, as the Wampanoags attack Swansea.
- June 26 – The Wampanoag warriors begin a three-day assault on English colonial towns in the Massachusetts Bay Colony in North America, with an assault on the villages of Rehoboth and Taunton. At the same time, Massachusetts troops march to Swansea, to join the Plymouth Colony troops. The warriors elude colonial troops and leave Mount Hope for Pocasset, Massachusetts. The Mohegan tribe travels to Boston, in order to assist the English colonists against the Wampanoags.
- June 28 – Brandenburg defeats the Swedish Army in the Battle of Fehrbellin.

=== July–September ===
- July 15 – The Narragansett tribe signs a peace treaty with Connecticut.
- July 16–24 – An envoy from Massachusetts attempts to negotiate with the Nipmuck tribe.
- August 2–4 – The Nipmucks attack Massachusetts troops and besiege Brookfield, Massachusetts.
- August 10 – King Charles II of England places the foundation stone of the Royal Greenwich Observatory near London; construction begins.
- August 13 – The Massachusetts Council orders that Christian Indians are to be confined to designated praying towns.
- September 1–2 – While Wampanoags and Nipmucks attack Deerfield, Massachusetts, Captain Samuel Moseley commands Massachusetts troops in an attack on the Pennacook tribe.
- September 8 – The English population of Willoughbyland arrives in Jamaica following provisions of the Treaty of Westminster (1674).
- September 12 – English colonists abandon Deerfield, Squakeag, and Brookfield due to a coalition of Indian attacks.
- September 15 – The Bremen-Verden Campaign of the Northern Wars begins, with the invasion of Amt Wildeshausen by the Münster army, and their advance on Verden via the city of Bremen.
- September 18 – The Narragansetts sign a treaty with the English in Boston; meanwhile, Massachusetts troops are ambushed near Northampton, Massachusetts.
- September 20 – In England, a fire destroys most of the town of Northampton. According to a contemporary account, "the market place (which was a very goodly one), the stately church of Allhallows, 2 other parish churches and above three-fourth parts of the whole town was consumed and laid in ashes.".

=== October–December ===
- October 5 – The Pocomtuc tribe attacks and destroys the English settlement at Springfield, Massachusetts.
- October 13 – The Massachusetts Council convenes and agrees that all Christian Indians should be ordered to move to Deer Island.
- October 29 – Gottfried Leibniz makes the first use of the long s (∫) as a symbol of the integral in calculus.
- November 2 – Commissioners of the Massachusetts Bay Colony and the Plymouth Colony (which are later merged into Massachusetts) begin a 10-day discussion on organizing a united force to attack the Narragansett tribe.
- November 11
  - Guru Teg Bahadur, ninth of the Sikh gurus, is executed by Mughal rulers, proclaiming that he prefers death rather than disavowing the right of Hindus to practice their own religion. He is succeeded by Guru Gobind Singh, who becomes the tenth Guru.
  - Gottfried Leibniz makes the earliest known use of infinitesimal calculus in the breaking down of a function.
- December 11 – Antonio de Vea expedition enters San Rafael Lake in western Patagonia.
- December 19 – United colonial forces attack the Narragansetts at the Great Swamp Fight.
- December 24 – 1675–1676 Malta plague epidemic begins.

=== Date unknown ===
- Giovanni Cassini discovers the Cassini Division in the rings of Saturn.
- Antonie van Leeuwenhoek begins to use a microscope for observing human tissues and liquids.

== Births ==
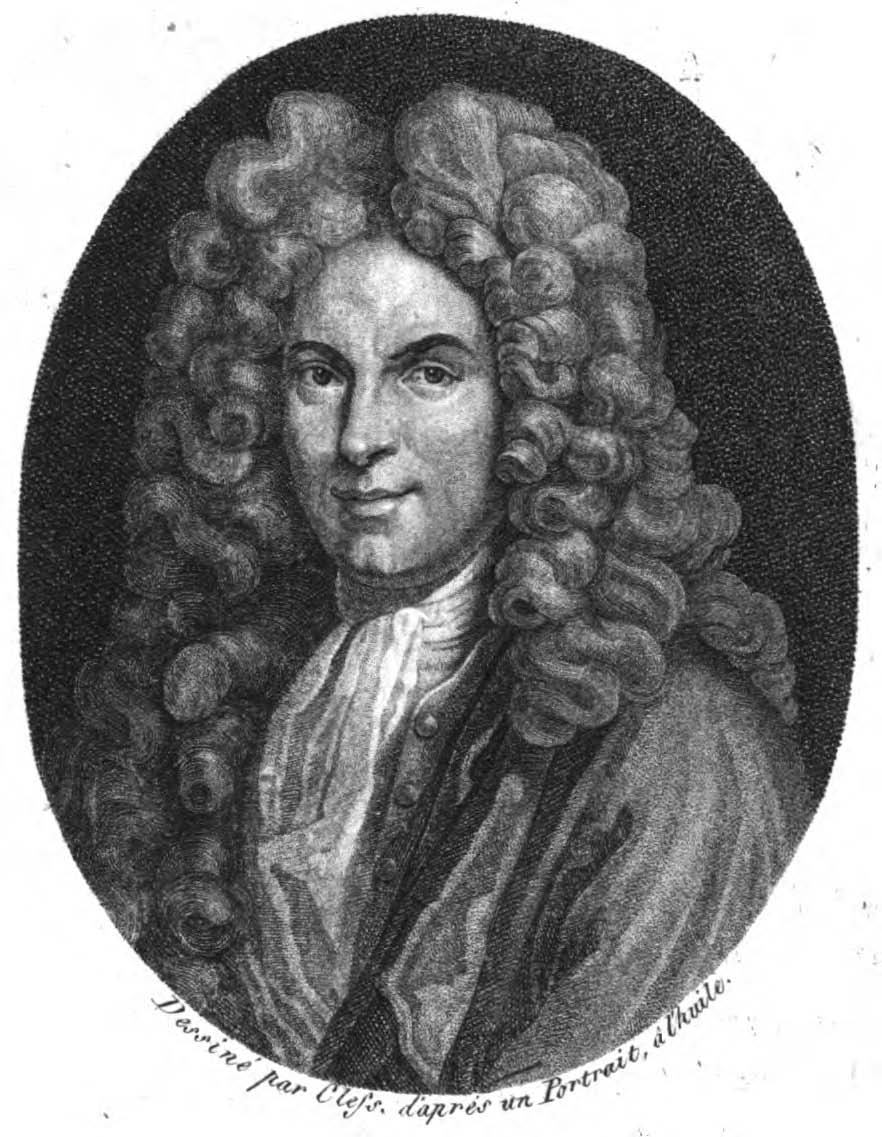
Guillaume Delisle

- January 16 – Louis de Rouvroy, duc de Saint-Simon, French writer (d. 1755)
- January 27 – Erik Benzelius the Younger, Swedish priest (d. 1743)
- February 21 – Franz Xaver Josef von Unertl, Bavarian politician (d. 1750)
- February 28 – Guillaume Delisle, French cartographer (d. 1726)
- March 31 – Pope Benedict XIV (d. 1758)
- May 29 – Humphry Ditton, English mathematician (d. 1715)
- June 1 – Francesco Scipione, marchese di Maffei, Italian archaeologist (d. 1755)
- July 5 – Mary Walcott, American accuser at the Salem witch trials
- July 12 – Evaristo Abaco, Italian composer (d. 1742)
- July 14 – Claude Alexandre de Bonneval, French soldier (d. 1747)
- September 2 – William Somervile, English poet (d. 1742)
- September 3 – Paul Dudley, Attorney-General of Massachusetts (d. 1751)
- September 27 – Dorothea Krag, Danish General Postmaster and noble (d. 1754)
- October 11 – Samuel Clarke, English philosopher (d. 1729)
- October 21 – Emperor Higashiyama of Japan (d. 1710)
- October 24 – Richard Temple, 1st Viscount Cobham, English soldier and politician (d. 1749)
- date unknown
  - William Jones, Welsh mathematician (d. 1749)
  - Tarabai, Indian queen regent of the Maratha Empire (d. 1761)
  - Cille Gad, Norwegian poet (d. 1711)

== Deaths ==
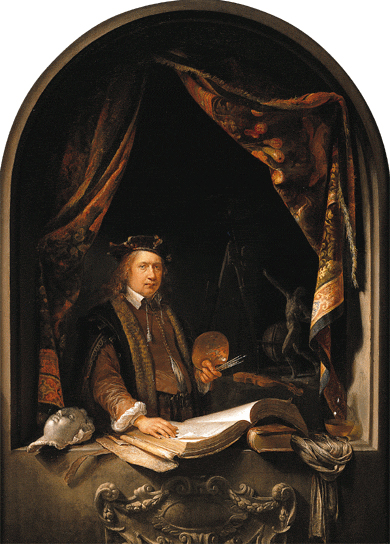
Gerrit Dou

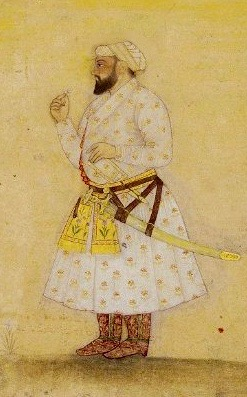
Guru Tegh Bahadur

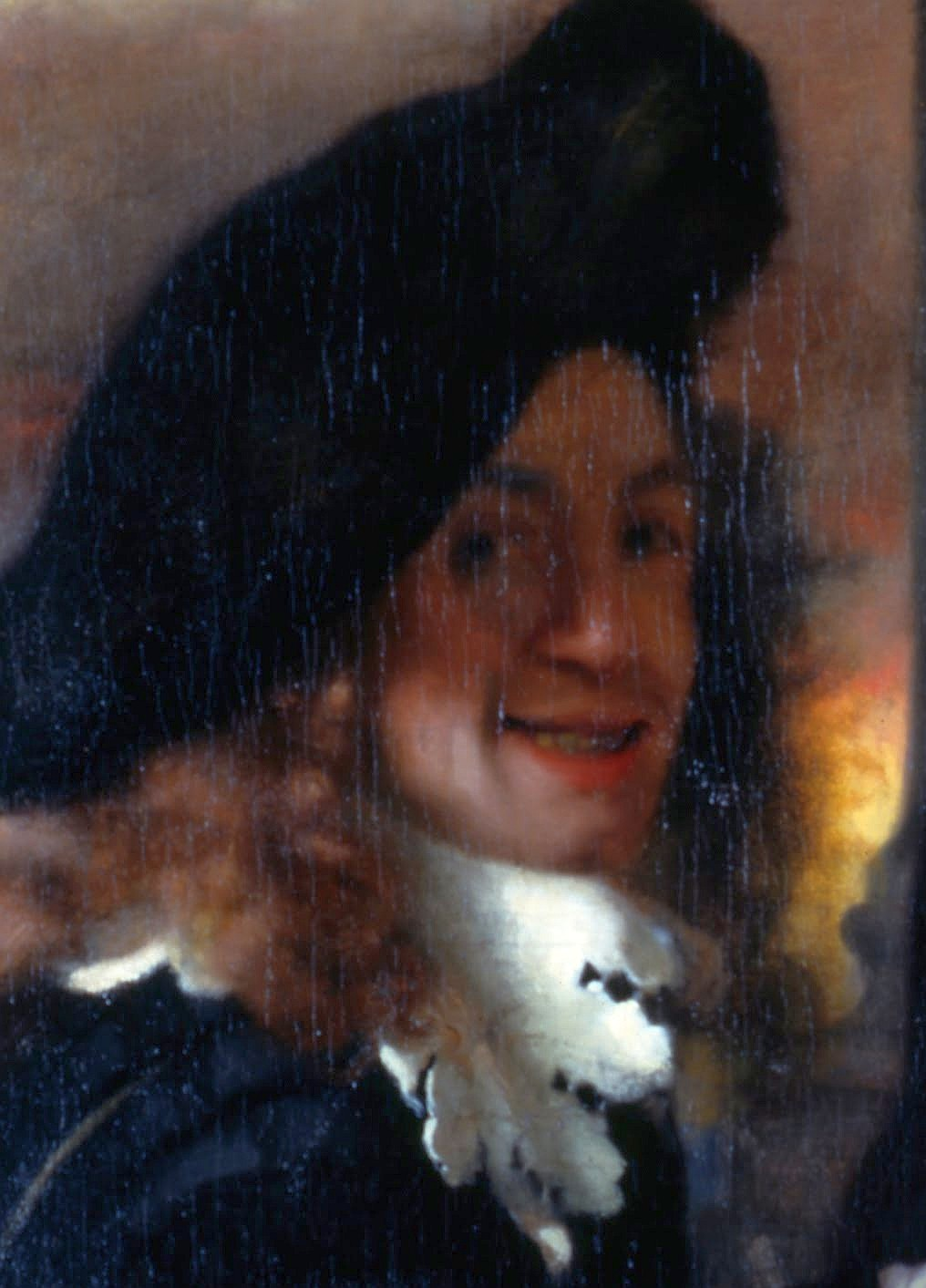
Johannes Vermeer

- January 9 – Francesco Maria Brancaccio, Catholic cardinal (b. 1592)
- January 26 – Domenico II Contarini, Doge of Venice (b. 1585)
- February 8 – Anna Moroni, Italian educator (b. 1613)
- February 9 – Gerhard Douw, Dutch painter (b. 1613)
- February 10 – Gervase Holles, English Member of Parliament (b. 1607)
- March 14 – Francis Davies, British bishop (b. 1605)
- March 18 – Arthur Chichester, 1st Earl of Donegall, Irish soldier (b. 1606)
- April 8 – Veit Erbermann, German theologian (b. 1597)
- April 10 – Dorothea of Saxe-Altenburg, Duchess of Saxe-Altenburg by births and by marriage Duchess of Saxe-Eisenach (b. 1601)
- April 12 – Richard Bennett, British Colonial Governor of Virginia (b. 1609)
- May 1 – Jonathan Rashleigh, English politician (b. 1591)
- May 6 – August Philipp, Duke of Schleswig-Holstein-Sonderburg-Beck, Danish-German prince and member of the House of Oldenburg (b. 1612)
- May 18
  - Stanisław Lubieniecki, Polish Socinian theologian (b. 1623)
  - Father Jacques Marquette, French missionary and explorer (b. 1636)
- May 27 – Gaspard Dughet, French painter (b. 1613)
- June 5 – John Mordaunt, 1st Viscount Mordaunt, English politician (b. 1626)
- June 11
  - Sir Anthony Cope, 4th Baronet, English Member of Parliament (b. 1632)
  - Dorothea Maria of Saxe-Weimar, Duchess of Saxe-Zeitz, by marriage Duchess of Saxe-Zeitz (b. 1641)
- June 12 – Charles Emmanuel II, Duke of Savoy (b. 1634)
- July 14 – Daniel Hallé, French painter (b. 1614)
- July 20 – Giles Strangways, English politician (b. 1615)
- July 25 – Johan Stiernhöök, Swedish lawyer (b. 1596)
- July 27 – Henri de la Tour d'Auvergne, Vicomte de Turenne, Marshal of France (b. 1611)
- July 28 – Bulstrode Whitelocke, English lawyer (b. 1605)
- August 5 – Brynjólfur Sveinsson, Icelandic bishop and scholar (b. 1605)
- August 16 – António Luís de Meneses, 1st Marquis of Marialva, Portuguese general and noble (b. 1596)
- August 29 – Joachim Irgens von Westervick, Dano–Norwegian nobleman (b. 1611)
- September 8
  - Amalia of Solms-Braunfels, Princess consort to Frederick Henry (b. 1602)
  - Frederick, Count of Nassau-Weilburg, ruling Count of Nassau-Weilburg (b. 1640)
- September 18 – Charles IV, Duke of Lorraine (b. 1604)
- September 23 – Valentin Conrart, French founder of the Académie française (b. 1603)
- October 10 – Tommaso Tamburini, Italian theologian (b. 1591)
- October 15 – William Wadsworth, American colonial pioneer (b. 1594)
- October 26 – William Sprague, English co-founder of Charlestown, Massachusetts (b. 1609)
- October 27 – Gilles de Roberval, French mathematician (b. 1602)
- November – Feodosia Morozova, Russian religious dissident martyr (b. 1632)
- November 1 – Guru Tegh Bahadur, 9th Sikh Guru (b. 1621)
- November 4 – Remigius van Leemput, painter from the Southern Netherlands (b. 1607)
- November 10 – Leopoldo de' Medici, Italian Catholic cardinal (b. 1617)
- November 11 – Thomas Willis, English doctor who played an important part in the history of anatomy (b. 1621)
- November 15 – Preben von Ahnen, German-born civil servant and landowner in Norway (b. 1606)
- November 21 – George William, Duke of Liegnitz (b. 1660)
- November 28 – Basil Feilding, 2nd Earl of Denbigh, English Civil War soldier (b. c. 1608)
- November 28 – Leonard Hoar, American President of Harvard University (b. 1630)
- November 30
  - Cecil Calvert, 2nd Baron Baltimore, colonial Governor of Maryland (b. 1605)
  - Sir John Lowther, 1st Baronet, of Lowther, English politician (b. 1605)
- December 6 – John Lightfoot, English churchman, scholar (b. 1602)
- December 15 (bur.) – Johannes Vermeer, Dutch painter (b. 1632)
- December 16 – Armand-Nompar de Caumont, duc de La Force, Marshal of France (b. 1580)
- December 23 – Caesar, duc de Choiseul, French marshal and diplomat (b. 1602)
- date unknown – Margareta Beijer, director of the Swedish Royal Post Office (b. 1625)
