= 1613 =

1613 in various calendars
- Gregorian calendar: 1613; MDCXIII
- Ab urbe condita: 2366
- Armenian calendar: 1062; ԹՎ ՌԿԲ
- Assyrian calendar: 6363
- Balinese saka calendar: 1534–1535
- Bengali calendar: 1019–1020
- Berber calendar: 2563
- English Regnal year: 10 Ja. 1 – 11 Ja. 1
- Buddhist calendar: 2157
- Burmese calendar: 975
- Byzantine calendar: 7121–7122
- Chinese calendar: 壬子年 (Water Rat); 4310 or 4103 — to — 癸丑年 (Water Ox); 4311 or 4104
- Coptic calendar: 1329–1330
- Discordian calendar: 2779
- Ethiopian calendar: 1605–1606
- Hebrew calendar: 5373–5374
- Hindu calendars
- Vikram Samvat: 1669–1670
- Shaka Samvat: 1534–1535
- Kali Yuga: 4713–4714
- Holocene calendar: 11613
- Igbo calendar: 613–614
- Iranian calendar: 991–992
- Islamic calendar: 1021–1022
- Japanese calendar: Keichō 18 (慶長１８年)
- Javanese calendar: 1533–1534
- Julian calendar: Gregorian minus 10 days
- Korean calendar: 3946
- Minguo calendar: 299 before ROC 民前299年
- Nanakshahi calendar: 145
- Thai solar calendar: 2155–2156
- Tibetan calendar: ཆུ་ཕོ་བྱི་བ་ལོ་ (male Water-Rat); 1739 or 1358 or 586 — to — ཆུ་མོ་གླང་ལོ་ (female Water-Ox); 1740 or 1359 or 587

August 29: The Battle of Cape Corvo is fought between Sicily and the Ottoman Empire

1613 (MDCXIII) was a common year starting on Tuesday of the Gregorian calendar and a common year starting on Friday of the Julian calendar, the 1613th year of the Common Era (CE) and Anno Domini (AD) designations, the 613th year of the 2nd millennium, the 13th year of the 17th century, and the 4th year of the 1610s decade. As of the start of 1613, the Gregorian calendar was 10 days ahead of the Julian calendar, which remained in localized use until 1923.

== Events ==
=== January–March ===
- January 11 – Workers in a sandpit in the Dauphiné region of France discover the skeleton of what is alleged to be a 30-foot tall man (the remains, it is supposed, of the giant Teutobochus, a legendary Gallic king who fought the Romans).
- January 20 – King James I of England successfully mediates the Treaty of Knäred between Denmark and Sweden.
- February 14 – Elizabeth, daughter of King James I of England, marries Elector Frederick V of the Palatinate.
- February 24 – King Anaukpetlun of Burma blockades the Portuguese port at Syriam with 80 warships and 3,000 men, then sets about to tunnel into the city.
- March 3 (February 21 O.S.) – An assembly of the Russian Empire elects Mikhail Romanov Tsar of Russia, ending the Time of Troubles. The House of Romanov will remain a ruling dynasty until 1917.
- March 27 – The first English child is born in what will become Canada at Cuper's Cove, Newfoundland to Nicholas Guy.
- March 29
  - Explorer Samuel de Champlain becomes the first unofficial Governor of New France in Canada.
  - Burmese soldiers, tunneling under the walls of the Portuguese colonial fortress at Syriam (now Thanlyin), bring down a section of the walls and sack the city. Portuguese Governor Filipe de Brito e Nicote and rebel Burmese General Natshinnaung are captured, and executed by impalement on April 9.

=== April–June ===
- April 13 – Samuel Argall captures Algonquian princess Pocahontas in Passapatanzy, Virginia, to ransom her for some English prisoners held by her father, Chief Powhatan. She is brought to Henricus as a hostage.
- May 12 – Mikhail Romanov arrives in Moscow to begin his reign as Tsar of Russia, after having been elected on March 3.
- May 14
  - The city of Hanthawaddy (now Bago) is restored as the capital of Burma by King Anaukpetlun, who relocates the government from Ava (now Inwa).
  - The ruler of the principality of Martaban, Binnya Dala, surrenders to the armies of King Anaukpetlun of Burma.
- May 23 – War of the Montferrat Succession: The defenders of the Italian city of Nizza Monferrato successfully resist a nine-day siege by the troops of Charles Emmanuel I, Duke of Savoy.
- May 27 – After getting an official proclamation that he is the French Governor of New France, explorer Samuel de Champlain begins exploration of the area westward from Quebec, traveling along the Ottawa River.
- June 28 (July 8 N.S.) – From Jamestown, John Rolfe makes the first shipment to England of tobacco grown in Virginia, dispatching it on the ship The Elizabeth. The tobacco arrives in England after a voyage of three weeks.
- June 29 – Fire destroys London's famed Globe Theatre, during a performance of Shakespeare's Henry VIII.

=== July–September ===
- July 20 (July 30 N.S.) – The first American-grown tobacco, produced in the British colony of Virginia, arrives in England after being dispatched 22 days earlier by John Rolfe.
- July 26 – Diego Marín de Negron, the Spanish Governor of Rio de la Plata y Paraguay, is assassinated by poisoning at his palace in Buenos Aires.C. Antonio Zinny, History of the governors of the Argentine provinces from 1810 to the present (Editoriales Huemul, 1941) p.105
- July 28 – Gregor Richter, the chief pastor of Görlitz, denounces Jacob Boehme as a heretic, in his Sunday sermon.
- August 29 – The Sicilians under de Aragon defeat the trade fleet of the Ottoman Empire, ending the Battle of Cape Corvo.
- September 29 – The New River is opened, to supply London with drinking water from Hertfordshire.

=== October–December ===
- October 21 – Gabriel Bathory, ruler of the Principality of Transylvania, is removed from office by vote of the nobles meeting at Gyulafehérvár (now Alba Iulia in Romania). Bathory refuses to vacate the palace at the Transylvanian capital at Várad, (now Oradea in Romania), and is murdered on October 27.
- October 23 – Gabriel Bethlen is elected as the new Prince of Transylvania.
- October 28 – Keichō embassy: Hasekura Tsunenaga departs Japan in the Date Maru with a Japanese diplomatic mission to the Holy See, scheduled to first travel to Acapulco in New Spain, with a goal of concluding an agreement between Tokugawa Ieyasu and the East India Company, permitting English merchants to live and trade in Japan.
- November 3 – English royal favourite Robert Carr is created 1st Earl of Somerset.
- November 30 – King Anaukpetlun of Burma sends an army of 4,000 troops to drive the Siamese occupiers from the Tenasserim coast.
- December 26 –
  - The Date Maru, carrying the Japanese diplomatic mission commanded Hasekura Tsunenaga, reaches North America, sighting Cape Mendocino on the California coast.
  - The Earl of Somerset marries Frances Howard, following the September 25 annulment of her marriage to Robert Devereux, 3rd Earl of Essex; the event is the inspiration for John Donne's Eclogue.
- December 26 – The Burmese Army defeats the Siamese Army at Tavoy. The city is now part of Myanmar as Dawei.
- December 27 – Mateo Leal de Ayala becomes the new Governor of Rio de la Plata y Paraguay, covering what will become the nations of Argentina, Chile and Paraguay. He succeeds Diego Marín de Negron, who was poisoned on July 26.

=== Date unknown ===
- A locust swarm destroys La Camarque, France.
- Kuwait City is founded.
- Sultan Agung of Mataram takes the throne of the kingdom of Mataram in Java.
- Near Jamestown, Virginia, Sir Thomas Dale starts a settlement called Bermuda City, which later becomes part of Hopewell, Virginia.

== Births ==
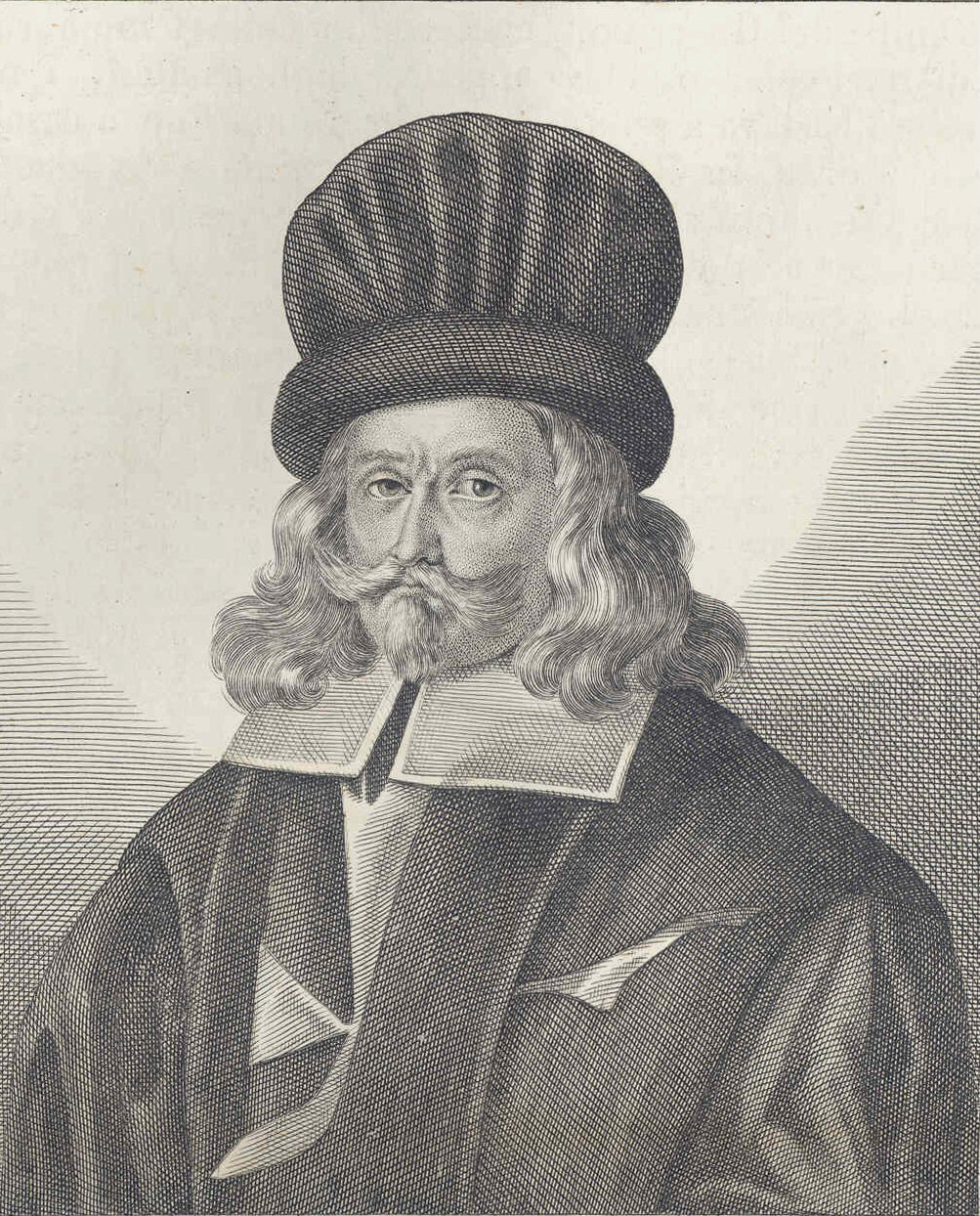
Mattia Preti

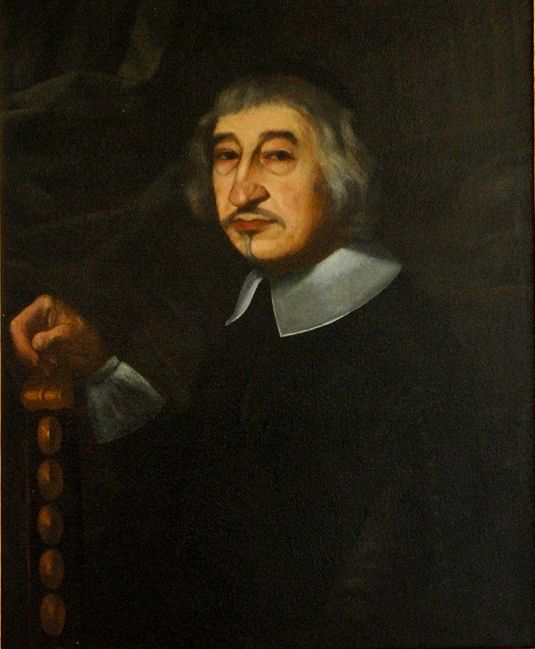
Stjepan Gradić

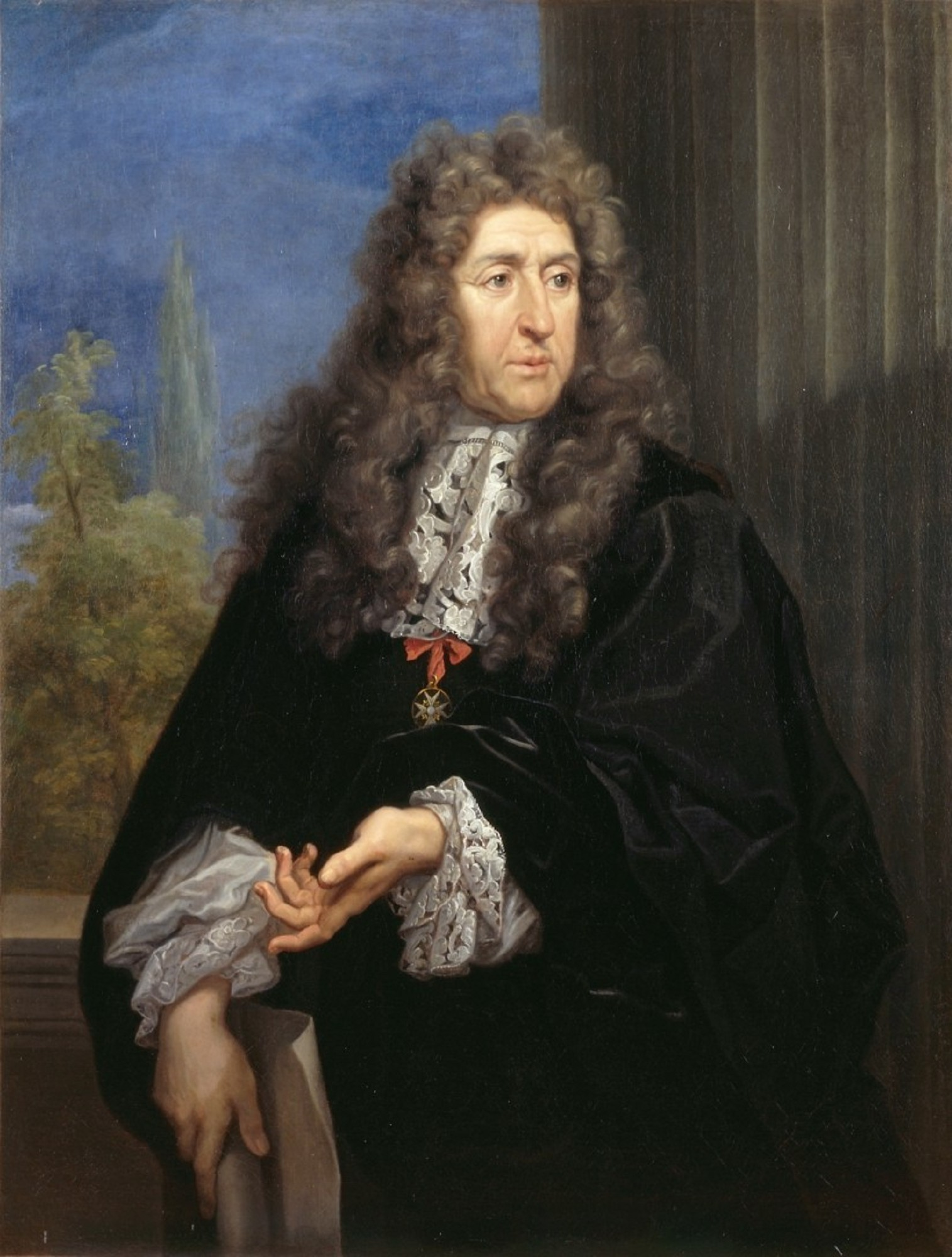
André Le Nôtre

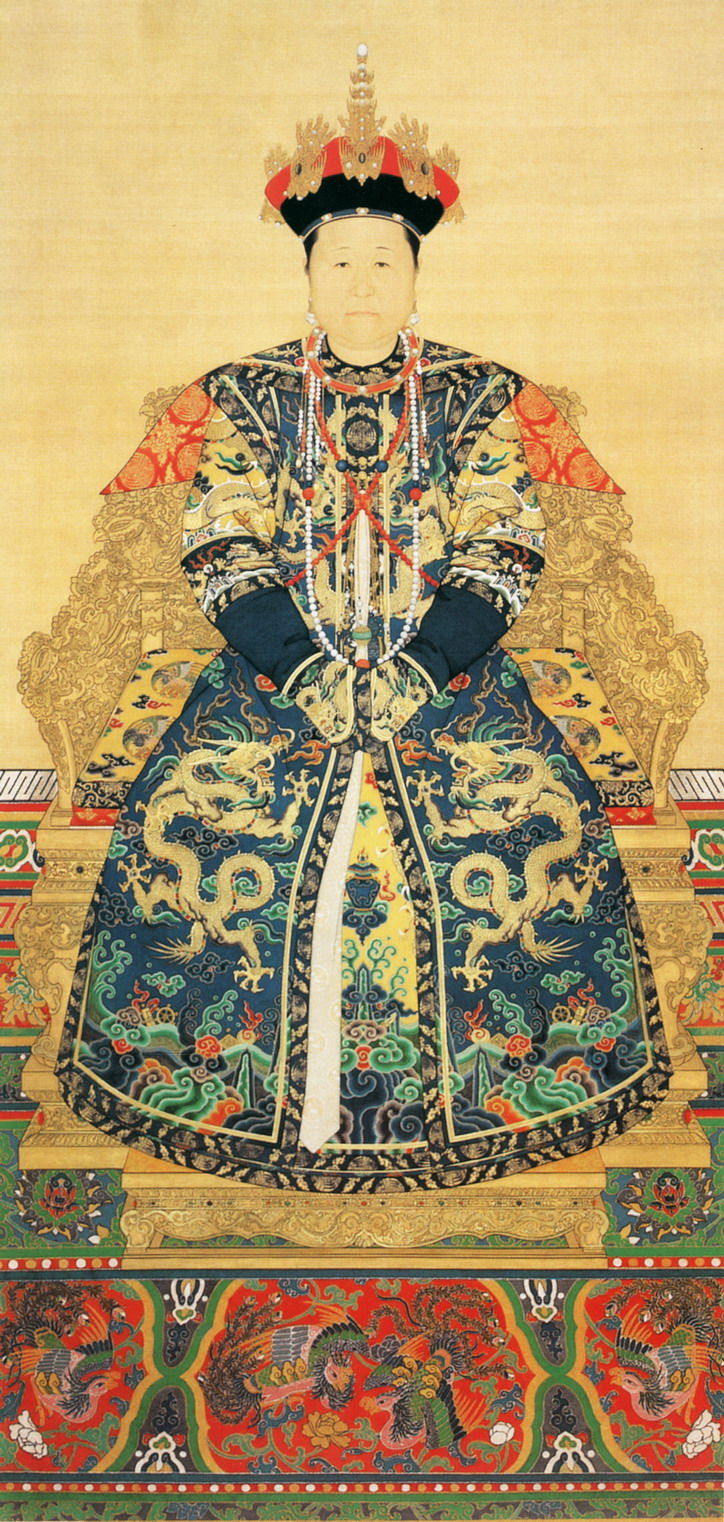
Empress Dowager Xiaozhuang

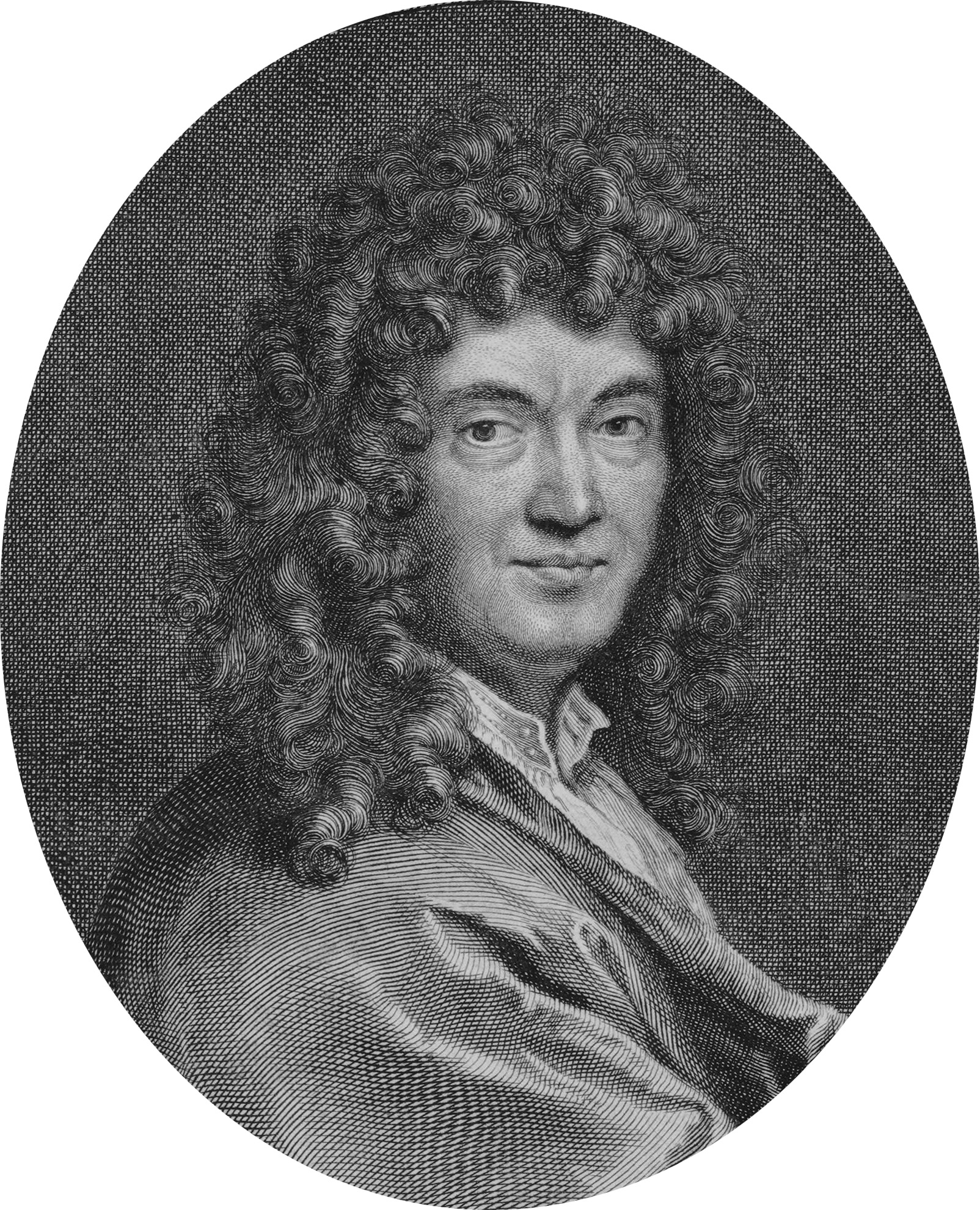
Claude Perrault

=== January–March ===
- January 14 – Pier Martire Armani, Italian painter (d. 1699)
- January 15 – Giovanni Pietro Bellori, Italian art historian (d. 1696)
- January 21 – George Gillespie, Scottish theologian (d. 1648)
- February 2
  - Noël Chabanel, French Jesuit missionary at Sainte-Marie among the Hurons (d. 1649)
  - William Thomas, Welsh Anglican bishop (d. 1689)
- February 7 – Johannes Musaeus, German theologian (d. 1681)
- February 24 – Mattia Preti, Italian painter (d. 1699)
- February 28 – John Pearson, English theologian and scholar (d. 1686)
- March 6
  - Stjepan Gradić, Croatian philosopher and scientist (d. 1683)
  - Anna Moroni, Italian educator (d. 1675)
- March 11 – Francesco Caetani, 8th Duke of Sermoneta, Governor of the Duchy of Milan (d. 1683)
- March 12 – André Le Nôtre, French landscape and garden designer (d. 1700)
- March 19 – John Swinfen, English politician (d. 1694)
- March 24 – Antonia of Württemberg, princess, literary figure, patron and Christian Kabbalist (d. 1679)
- March 28 – Empress Dowager Xiaozhuang, concubine of Qing dynasty ruler Hong Taiji (d. 1688)
- March 29 – Louis-Isaac Lemaistre de Sacy, French Bible translator (d. 1684)

=== April–June ===
- April 1
  - Giulio Bartolocci, Italian Biblical scholar (d. 1687)
  - Charles de Saint-Évremond, French soldier and writer (d. 1703)
- April 7 – Gerrit Dou, Dutch painter (d. 1675)
- April 18 – Philip Wharton, 4th Baron Wharton, English soldier (d. 1696)
- April 21 – Franciscus Plante, Dutch painter, chaplain (d. 1690)
- April 29 – Christoph Bach, German musician (d. 1661)
- May 9 – Mattias de' Medici, Italian noble (d. 1667)
- May 10 – François Chauveau, French painter (d. 1676)
- May 15 – George Seton, Lord Seton, Scottish noble (d. 1648)
- May 31 – John George II, Elector of Saxony (1656–1680) (d. 1680)
- June 1 – William Wirich, Count of Daun-Falkenstein, German nobleman (d. 1682)
- June 13 – Johann Ernst, Count of Hanau-Münzenberg (1641–1642) (d. 1642)
- June 16 – John Cleveland, English poet (d. 1658)

=== July–September ===
- July 15 – Gu Yanwu, Chinese philologist and geographer (d. 1682)
- July 16 – Alderano Cybo, Catholic cardinal (d. 1700)
- August 7 – William Frederick, Prince of Nassau-Dietz, Dutch stadtholder (d. 1664)
- August 15 – Gilles Ménage, French scholar (d. 1692)
- August 18 – Sir Thomas Peyton, 2nd Baronet, English politician (d. 1684)
- August 20 – Duchess Elisabeth Sophie of Mecklenburg, German poet composer and (by marriage) Duchess of Brunswick-Lüneburg (d. 1676)
- August 24 – Bartholomew Holzhauser, German priest, founder of a religious community, visionary, writer of prophecies (d. 1658)
- August 29 – John Jolliffe, English politician and businessman (d. 1680)
- September 8 – Henri Albert de La Grange d'Arquien, Catholic cardinal (d. 1707)
- September 15 – François de La Rochefoucauld, French writer (d. 1680)
- September 19 – Sir John Norwich, 1st Baronet, English Member of Parliament (d. 1661)
- September 25 – Claude Perrault, French architect (d. 1688)

=== October–December ===
- October 3 – Marion Delorme, French courtesan known for her relationships with the important men of her time (d. 1650)
- October 12 – Jacques d'Arthois, Flemish painter (d. 1686)
- October 13
  - Luisa de Guzmán, Duchess of Braganza, queen consort of Portugal (d. 1666)
  - Adriaan Heereboord, Dutch philosopher (d. 1661)
- October 19 – Charles of Sezze, Italian Franciscan friar and saint (d. 1670)
- October 28 – Edmund Bowyer, English politician (d. 1681)
- November 5 – Isaac de Benserade, French poet (d. 1691)
- November 12 – Sir Ralph Verney, 1st Baronet, of Middle Claydon, English Baronet (d. 1696)
- November 16 – Frederick, Prince of Anhalt-Harzgerode (1635–1670) (d. 1670)
- November 20 – Tyman Oosdorp, Dutch Golden Age brewer and magistrate of Haarlem (d. 1668)
- November 24 – John Knight, Member of the Parliament of England (d. 1683)
- November 25 – Philip VII, Count of Waldeck-Wildungen (1638–1645) (d. 1645)
- December 4 (bapt.) – Samuel Butler, English satirist (d. 1680)
- December 10 – Izaak van Oosten, Flemish painter (d. 1661)
- December 11 – Amar Singh Rathore, Rajput nobleman affiliated with the royal house of Marwar (d. 1644)
- December 23 – Carl Gustaf Wrangel, Field Marshal of Sweden (d. 1676)
- December 28 – Bullen Reymes, English courtier, diplomat and politician (d. 1672)

=== Date unknown ===
- Henry Vane, English politician (d. 1662)
- Khushal Khan Khattak, Afghan poet (d. 1690)
- John Cutt, New England merchant & politician (d. 1681)

=== Probable ===
- Richard Crashaw, English poet (d. 1649)

== Deaths ==
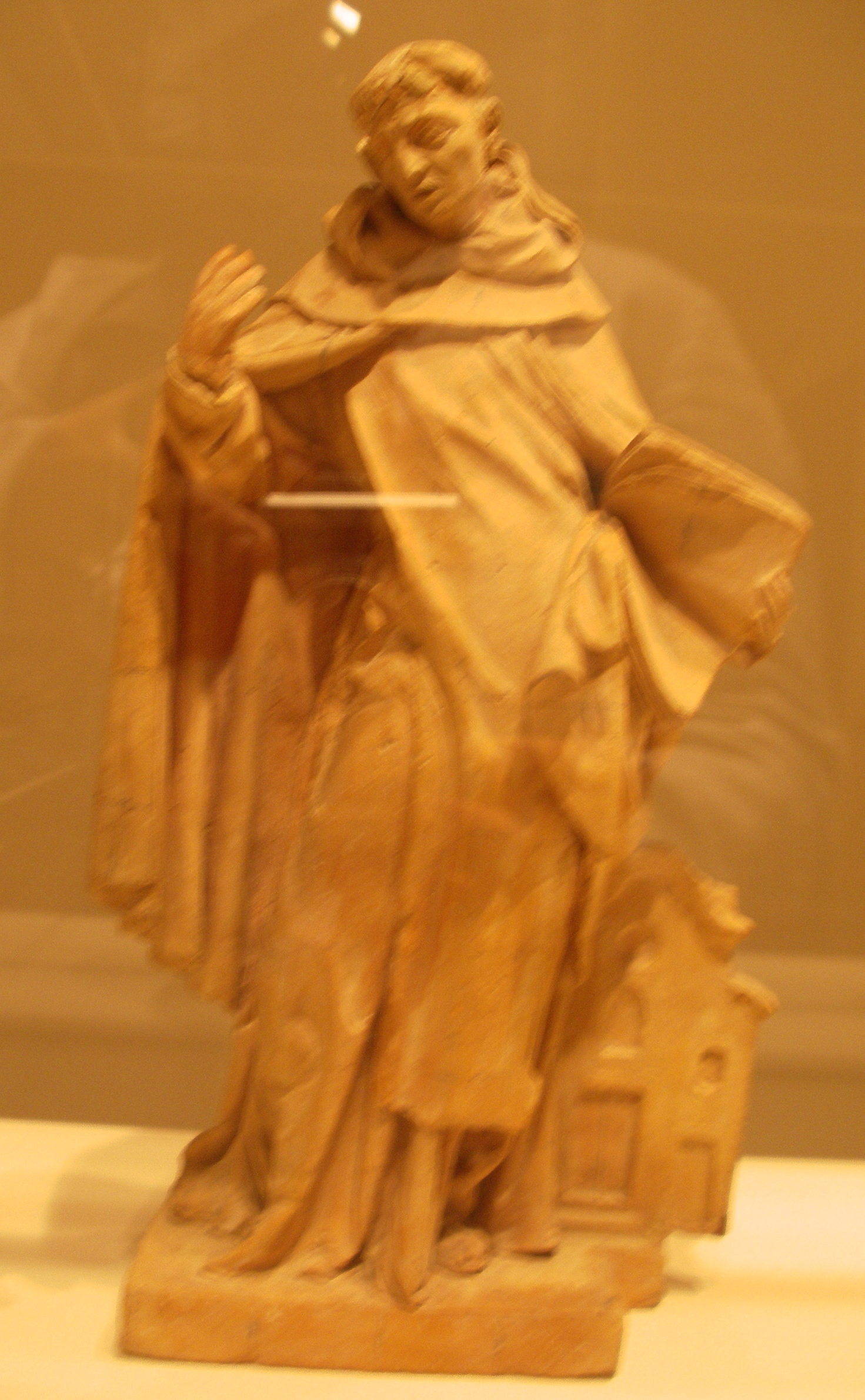
Juan García López-Rico

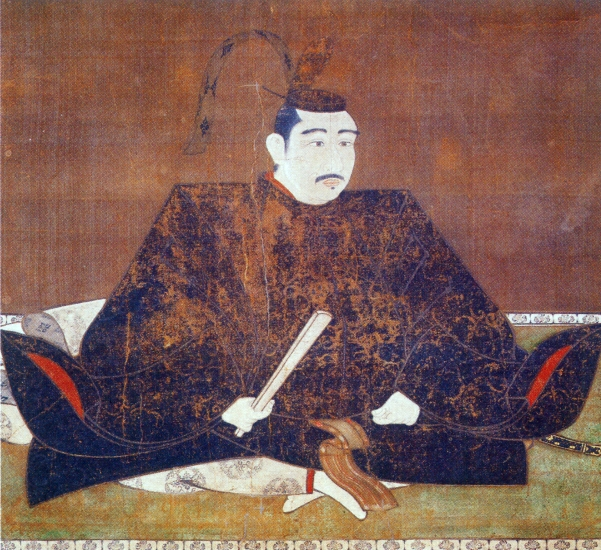
Ikeda Terumasa

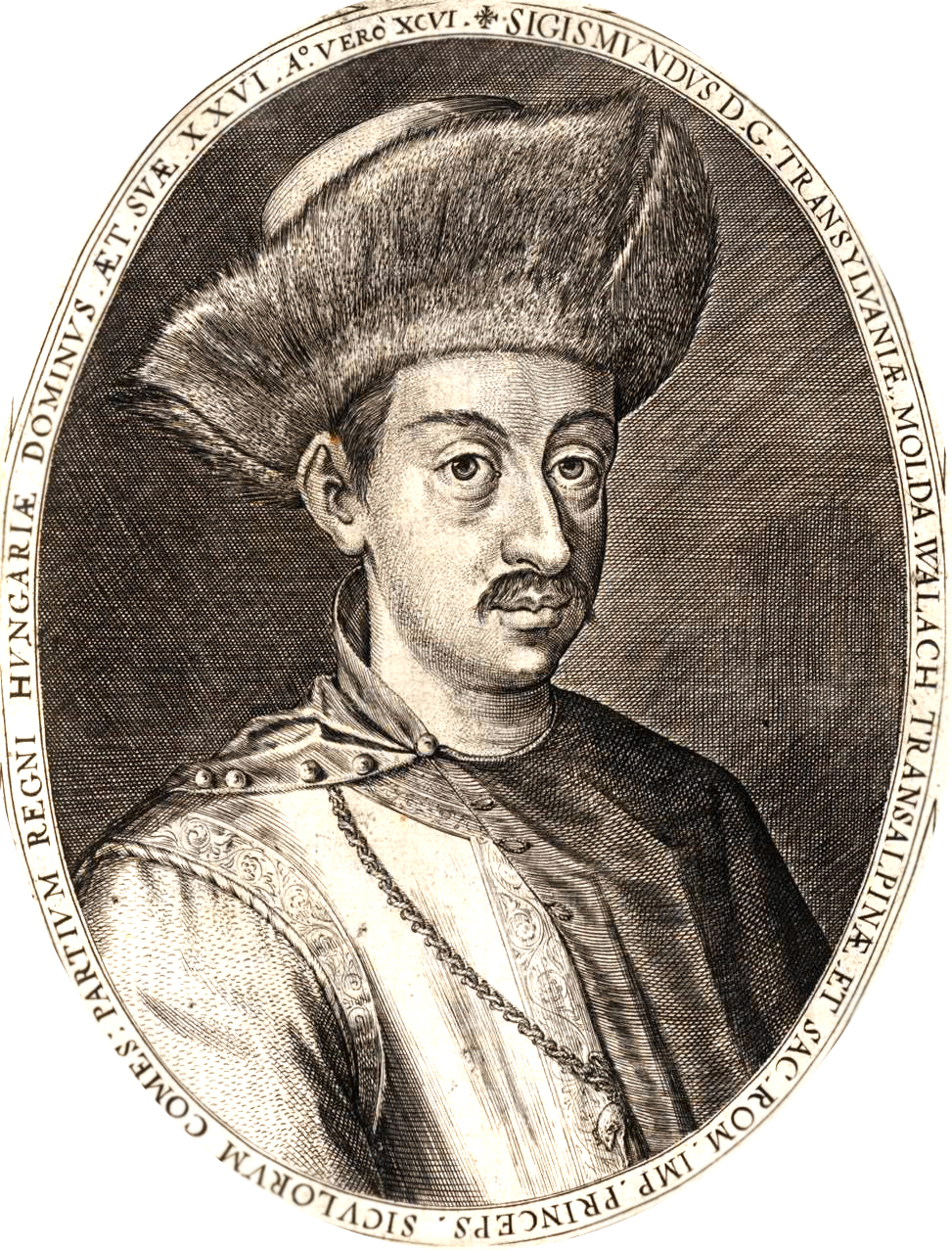
Sigismund Báthory

=== January–July ===
- January 2 – Salima Sultan Begum, Empress of the Mughal Empire (b. 1539)
- January 12 – George Blackwell, English Catholic archpriest (b. 1545)
- January 18 – Antoon Claeissens, Flemish Baroque painter (b. 1536)
- January 27 – Anna of Saxony, German noblewoman (b. 1567)
- January 28 – Thomas Bodley, English diplomat and library founder (b. 1545)
- February 14 – Juan García López-Rico, Spanish Catholic priest from the Trinitarian Order, founded the Order of Discalced Carmelites (b. 1561)
- February 16 – Johannes Letzner, German Protestant priest and historian (b. 1531)
- February 27 – Pietro Facchetti, Italian painter (b. 1539)
- March 2 – Rudolph Snellius, Dutch linguist and mathematician (b. 1546)
- March 13 – Giovanni Battista Caccini, Italian artist (b. 1556)
- March 16
  - Sigrid Sture, Swedish Governor (b. 1538)
  - Ikeda Terumasa, Japanese daimyō (b. 1565)
- March 23 – Jerónimo de Ayanz y Beaumont, Spanish inventor (b. 1553)
- March 27 – Sigismund Báthory, Prince of Transylvania (b. 1572)
- April 27 – Robert Abercromby, Scottish Jesuit missionary (b. 1532)
- June 3 – Allahverdi Khan, Georgian-born Iranian general (b. 1590)
- June 8 – Cigoli, Italian painter (b. 1559)
- June 15 – Magdalena Moons, Dutch heroine (b. 1541)

=== July–September ===
- July 2 – Bartholomaeus Pitiscus, German astronomer and mathematician (b. 1561)
- July 19 – Nicolaus van Aelst, Flemish engraver (b. 1526)
- July 20 – Sebastian Lubomirski, Polish-Lithuanian nobleman (szlachcic) (b. c. 1546)
- July 30 – Henry Julius, Duke of Brunswick-Lüneburg (b. 1564)
- August 1
  - Francesco Grimaldi, Italian architect (b. 1543)
  - Thomas Twyne, English actor (b. 1543)
- August 7 – Thomas Fleming, English judge (b. 1544)
- August 14 – David Lindsay, Scottish bishop (b. 1531)
- August 18 – Giovanni Artusi, Italian composer (b. c. 1540)
- August 22 – Dominicus Baudius, Dutch historian and poet (b. 1561)
- August 25 – William Waldegrave, English Member of Parliament (b. 1540)
- September 8
  - Carlo Gesualdo, Italian composer (b. 1566)
  - James Pemberton, British goldsmith (b. 1550)
- September 14 – Thomas Overbury, English poet and essayist (murdered) (b. 1581)

=== October–December ===
- October 9 – Henry Constable, English poet (b. 1562)
- October 11 – John Petre, 1st Baron Petre, English politician (b. 1549)
- October 22 – Mathurin Régnier, French satirist (b. 1573)
- October 26 – Johann Bauhin, Swiss botanist (b. 1541)
- October 27 – Gabriel Báthory, Prince of Transylvania (b. 1589)
- November 4 – Cristóbal Rodríguez Juárez, Spanish Catholic archbishop (b. 1547)
- November 16 – Trajano Boccalini, Italian satirist (b. 1556)
- November 21 – Rose Lok, English Marian exile (b. 1526)
- November 23 – Charles Philippe de Croÿ, Marquis d’Havré, Belgian noble and politician (b. 1549)
- November 26 – Henry Berkeley, 7th Baron Berkeley, English politician (b. 1534)
- December 6 – Anton Praetorius, German pastor (b. 1560)
- December 7 – Simon VI, Count of Lippe, imperial count and ruler of the County of Lippe (Germany) since 1563 (b. 1554)
- date unknown
  - Phùng Khắc Khoan, Vietnamese military strategist, politician, diplomat and poet (b. 1528)
  - Beatrice Michiel, Venetian spy (b. 1553)
