= 1703 in Sweden =

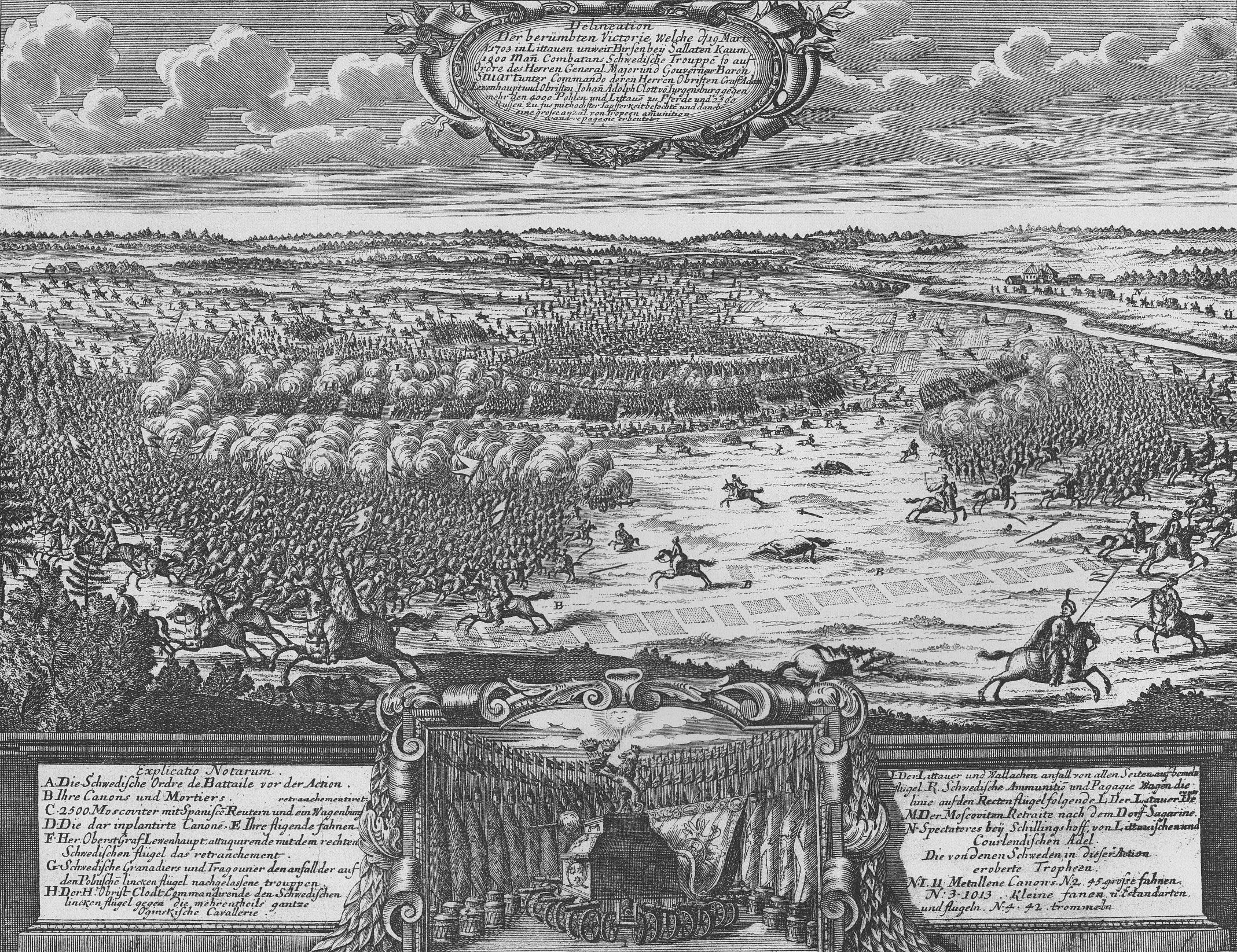
Battle of Saladen, 1703

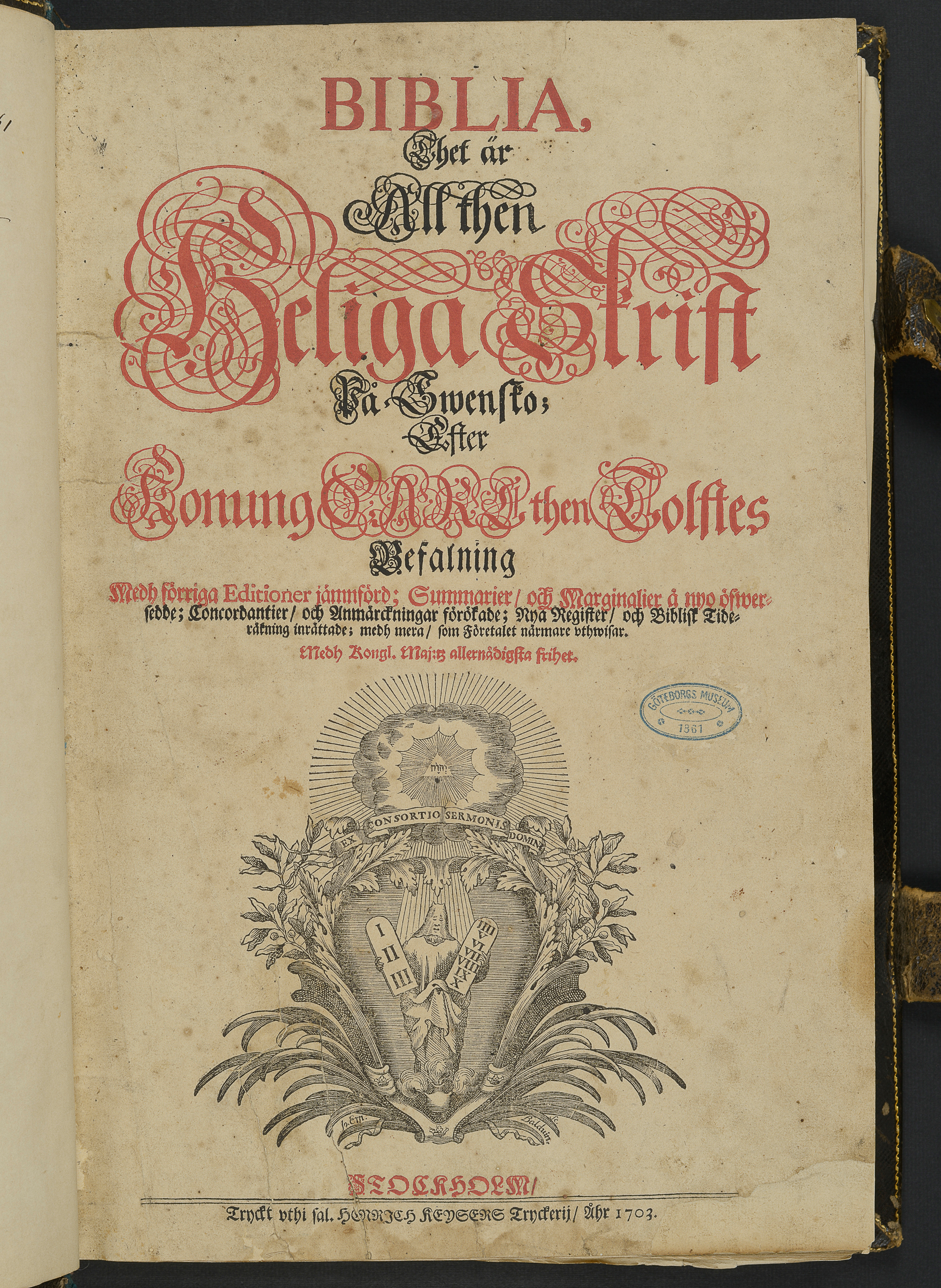
Title page of Charles XII Bible, printed in Stockholm in 1703.

Events from the year 1703 in Sweden.

== Incumbents ==
- Monarch – Charles XII

== Events ==
- 19 March - Swedish victory at the Battle of Saločiai.
- 21 April - Swedish victory at the Battle of Pułtusk (1703).
- July 19 - Russian victory at the Battle of Systerbäck.
- October 14 - Swedish victory at the Siege of Thorn
- The Charles XII Bible is completed.

== Births ==
- 23 March - Cajsa Warg cookery book author (died 1769)

== Deaths ==
- 16 January - Erik Dahlbergh, engineer, soldier, and field marshal (born 1625)
- unknown - Maria Skytte, notorious baroness (born 1630s)
