= 1604 in Sweden =

Events from the year 1604 in Sweden. Part of the early Vasa era.

== Incumbents ==
- Monarch – Charles IX

== Events ==
- February 24 – At Linköping in Sweden, the Riksdag declares that Sigismund, Grand Duke of Lithuania and King of Poland, who has been absent for five years, has effectively abdicated as King of Sweden. The regent, Karl, Duke of Södermanland, is formally acknowledged as King Charles IX of Sweden after John, Duke of Östergötland renounced his claim to the throne, and all non-Lutherans are banned from inheriting the throne.
- March 22 – Karl IX begins his reign as King of Sweden.
- 25 September - Polish victory in the Battle of Weissenstein.
- - The city of Gothenburg is founded.

== Births ==
- October 14 - Nils Brahe, soldier (died 1632)
