= 1656 in Sweden =

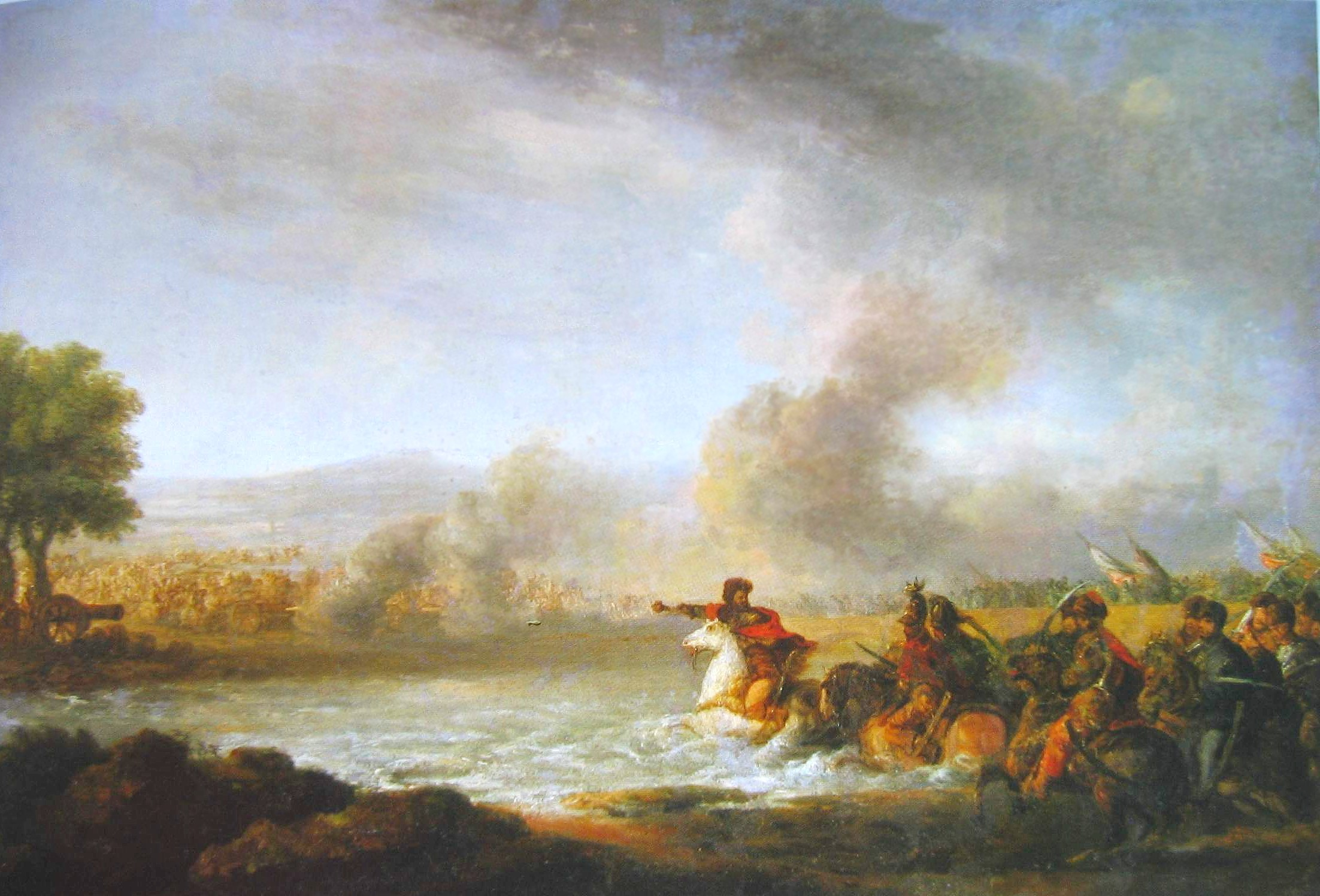
Battle of Warka 1656

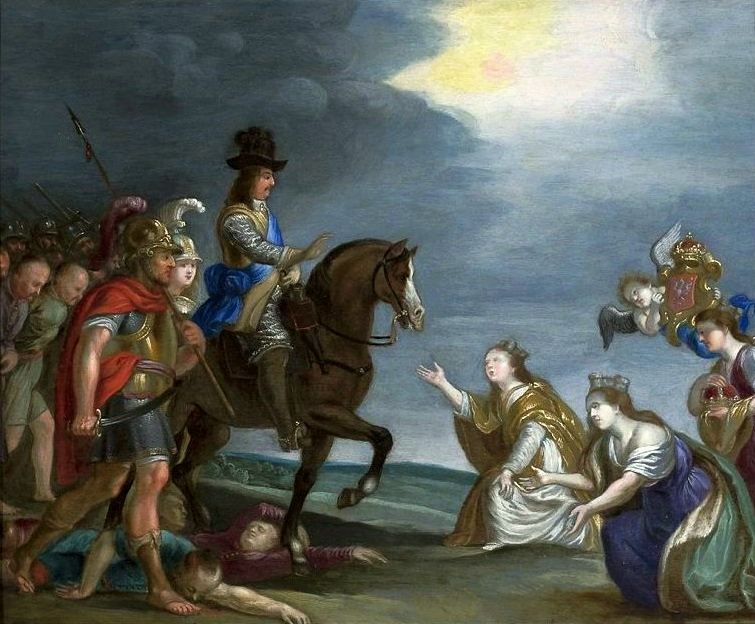
Anonymous Triumph of Charles X Gustav

Events from the year 1656 in Sweden

== Incumbents ==
- Monarch – Charles X Gustav

== Events ==
- January 17 – Treaty of Königsberg is signed, establishing an alliance between Charles X Gustav of Sweden and Frederick William, Elector of Brandenburg.
- Battle of Radom (1656)
- Battle of Gołąb
- April 1 – Lwów Oath: John II Casimir Vasa, King of Poland, grands the title of the "Queen and Protector of Poland", to the painting Black Madonna of Częstochowa in the cathedral of Lwów after the saving of the Jasna Góra Monastery during the Deluge, an event which changed the course of the Second Northern War.
- Battle of Warka
- Russo-Swedish War (1656–58)
- July 28–30 – Battle of Warsaw: Led by King Charles X Gustav of Sweden, the armies of the Swedish Empire and the Margraviate of Brandenburg defeat the forces of the Polish–Lithuanian Commonwealth near Warsaw.
- Battle of Filipów
- December 20 – Treaty of Labiau is signed between Charles X Gustav of Sweden and Frederick William, Elector of Brandenburg.
- Battle of Chojnice (1656)
- The Stockholms Banco, the first bank to issue banknotes, is founded.
- The case of Karin Svensdotter, who claimed to have sexual relations with a fairy.

== Births ==
- May 26 - Märta Ljungberg, innkeeper and local profile (died 1741)
- date unknown - Gertrud Svensdotter, the first witness accuser in the Great Witch Hunt of 1668 (died 1675)
