= Gese Wechel =

First female Swedish postmaster (served 1637–1642)

Gese Wechel (born in Hamburg, died in Lübeck 1645), was the managing director of the Swedish Post Office, Postverket from 1637 until 1642. She was the second director of the Swedish Post Office, and the first female postmaster in Sweden, entitled Sveriges rikes postmästarinna (Postmistress of the Swedish Realm).

== Life ==
Gese Wechel was originally a domestic servant in the household of the Swedish envoy in Hamburg in Germany. In the 1630s, she married Anders Wechel, a German in Swedish service who managed the Swedish postoffice in Hamburg. In 1636, the Swedish Post Office was founded, and she followed her husband to Sweden, where he received the position as its first managing director. Anders Wechel was in bad health, and she was in reality forced to manage his work as director.

In 1637, she became a widow and continued to manage the post office, and 25 October 1638 she was officially confirmed in her position as director with the acknowledgement that she had already functioned as such for two years. She worked alongside Steen von Steenhausen, who tended to the juridical matters of the office, and all orders were to be signed by them jointly.

In 1642, Wechel was fired from her post with reference to her gender. She moved to Lübeck, where she died. Gese Wechel was the first example of the female postmasters in Sweden who took over their profession from their late spouses: from 1637 until 1722, eight percent (or 40) of the postmasters in Sweden were female, and Margareta Beijer had the same position as Wechel in 1669-1673. Women were excluded from service in the new regulation of 1722, and allowed again in 1863.

== See also ==
- Alexandrine von Taxis, German equivalent
- Dorothea Krag, Danish equivalent
