= 1689 in Sweden =

The following events occurred in the year 1689 in Sweden:

== Incumbents ==
- Monarch – Charles XI

== Events ==
- - The Riksdag of the Estates grant the monarch the right to taxation during war.
- - Opposition from the Riksdag to the monarch is deemed Lèse-majesté.
- - Helicons Blomster by Lasse Lucidor.
- - Husqvarna Group is founded.
- - Alliance between Sweden and Lüneburg toward Denmark.

== Births ==
- - Lars Gathenhielm, pirate and royal privateer (died 1718)
- unknown - Margareta Gyllenstierna, politically active countess (died 1740)

== Deaths ==
- 24 February - Elsa Elisabeth Brahe, duchess (born 1632)
- - Christina, Queen of Sweden, former monarch (born 1626)
- - Adolph John I, Count Palatine of Kleeburg, duke (born 1629)
