= 1558 in Sweden =

This article is about events from the year 1558 in Sweden.

== Incumbents ==
- Monarch – Gustav I

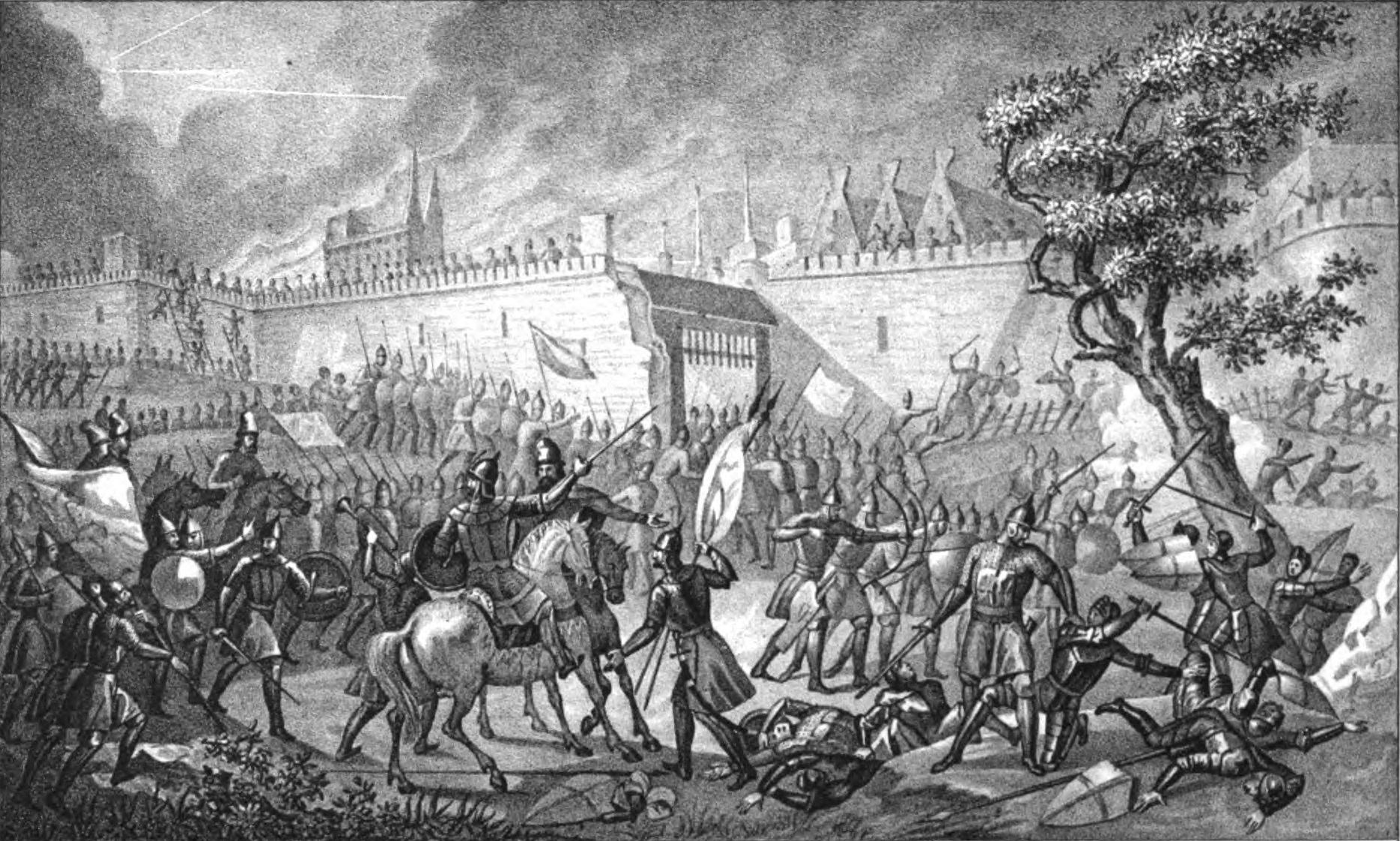
Siege of Narva 1558.

== Events ==
=== January ===
- 28 January - Russian attack on Livonia starts the Livonian War

=== February ===
- The King bans the use of oak for anything other than as building material for the royal navy.
- Petrus Follingius is appointed and consecrated as Bishop of Turku, succeeding Mikael Agricola.

=== Undated ===
- Jöran Persson appointed royal secretary.
- Crown Prince Eric proposes to Elizabeth I of England.
- Danviken Hospital is founded.
- A new order of mass, Liturgia eller Then Svenska Messordning, is published in both Latin and Swedish.

== Births ==
- 8 March - Gustaf Brahe, official (d. 1615)
