= 1632 in Sweden =

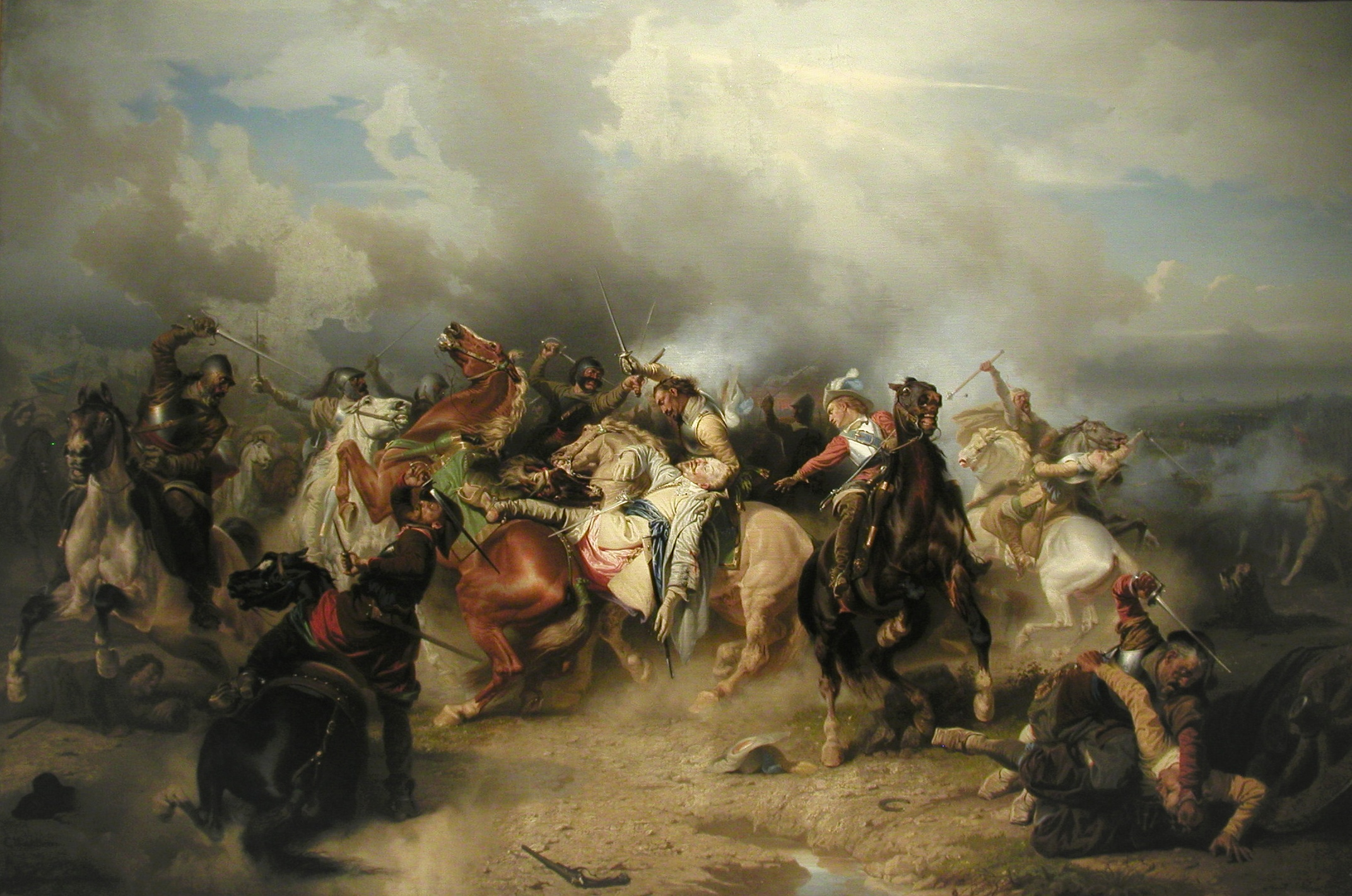
Battle of Lutzen

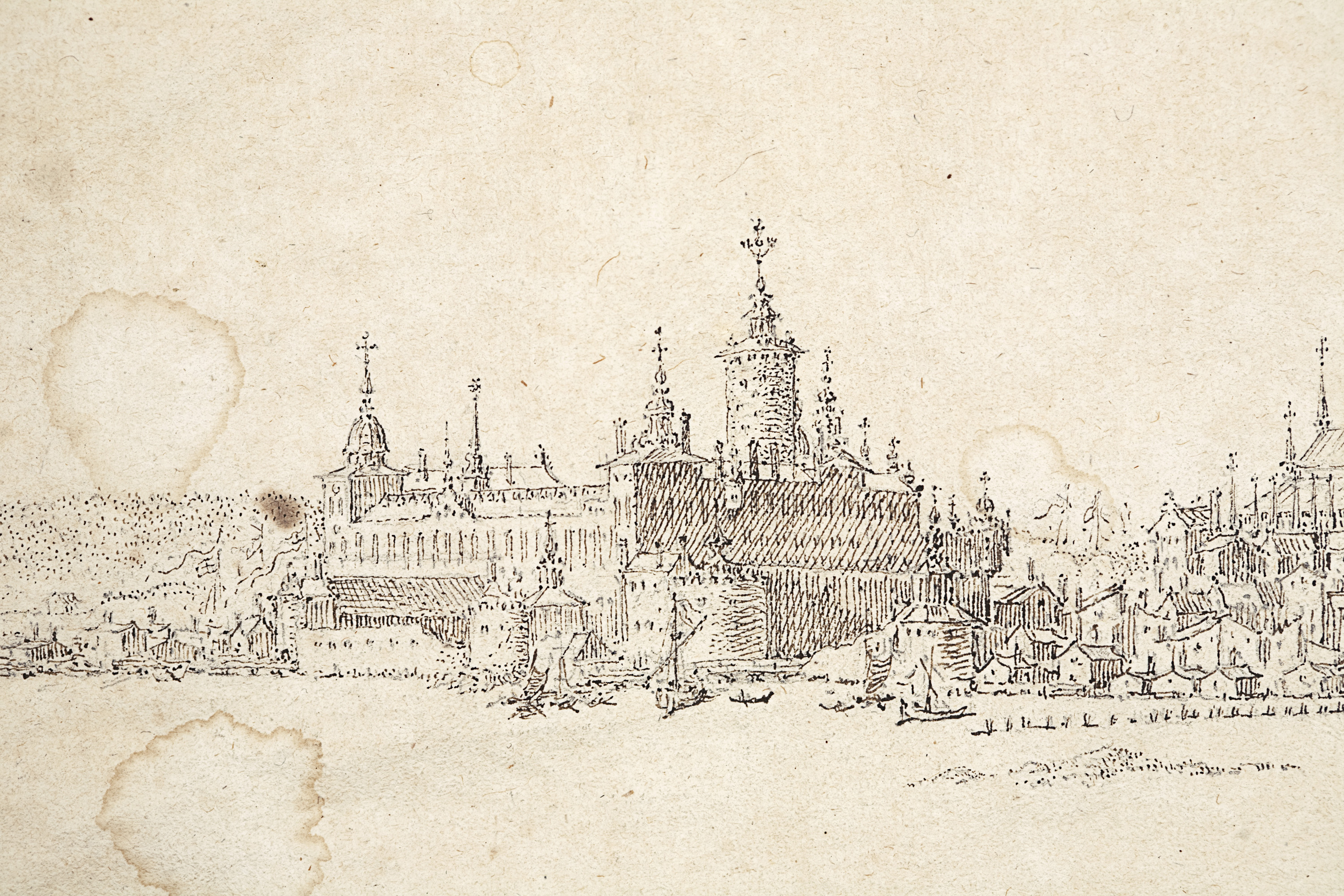

Events from the year 1632 in Sweden.

== Incumbents ==
- Monarch – Gustaf II Adolf then Christina

== Events ==
- Foundation of the Rudbeckii flickskola, the first school for girls.
- March – Thirty Years' War – Gustaf II Adolf of Sweden, invades Bavaria with his army.
- April 15 – Thirty Years' War – Gustaf II Adolf defeats Tilly for the second time within a year at the Battle of Rain. Tilly is severely wounded during the battle.
- May – Thirty Years' War – Munich, capital of Bavaria, is captured by the Swedish army.
- September 9 – Thirty Years' War – Besieged by Wallenstein at Nuremberg, Swedish king Gustavus Adolphus attempts to break the siege, but is defeated in the Battle of the Alte Veste.
- October 15 – Official opening of the University of Tartu in Swedish Livonia.
- November 6 – Thirty Years' War – Battle of Lützen – Swedish king Gustaf II Adolf leads an assault on Wallenstein's army, but is killed early in the battle. Despite the king's death, the Swedish commanders manage to rally the army and eventually defeat Wallenstein's army. As a result, Wallenstein withdraws from Saxony.
  - Following the death of Gustaf II Adolf, king of Sweden, he is succeeded by his 6-year-old daughter Christina while five regents, headed by Axel Oxenstierna, govern the country since she is underage.
- Catharina Stopia is appointed to succeed her deceased spouse as Sweden's ambassador to Russia, and becomes the first female diplomat of her country.

== Births ==
- 29 January – Elsa Elisabeth Brahe, Swedish countess (died 1689)
- 16 December – Erik Benzelius the Elder, theologian and archbishop of Uppsala (died 1709)

== Deaths ==
- April 30 – Sigismund III Vasa, Former King of Sweden, King of Poland, Grand Duke of Lithuania (died 1632)
- November 16 – Gustav II Adolf, King of Sweden (died 1632)
