= 1552 in Sweden =

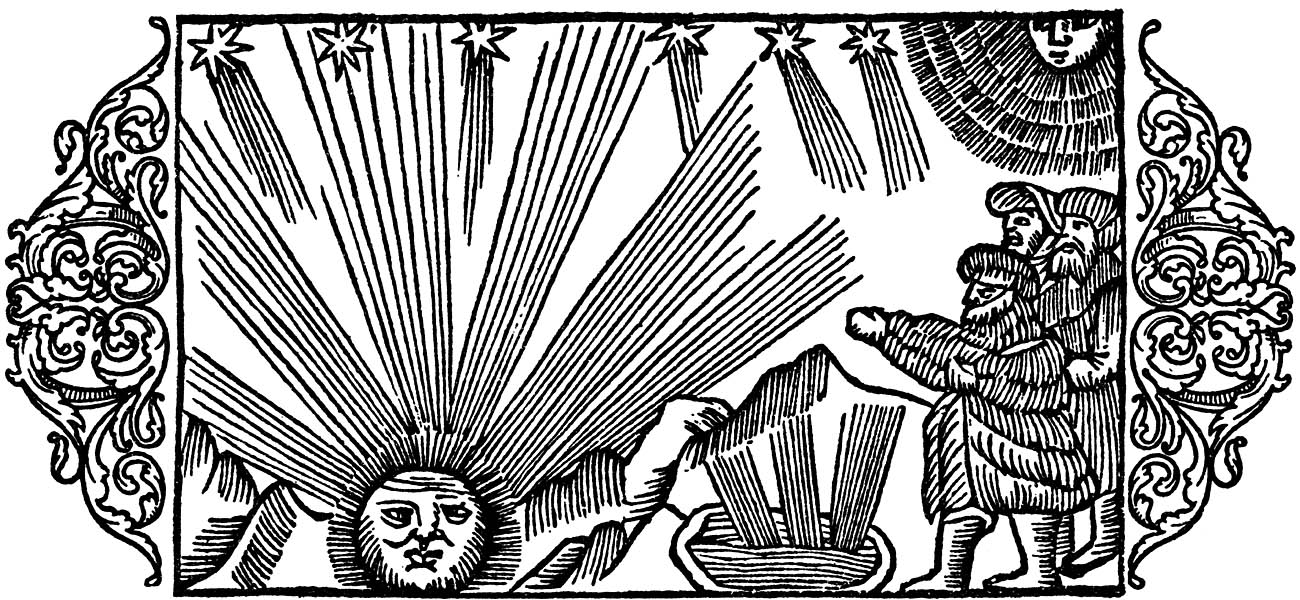
Olaus Magnus - On the Severe Cold

Events from the year 1552 in Sweden

== Incumbents ==
- Monarch – Gustav I

== Events ==
- 22 August - The wedding between the King and Catherine Stenbock.

== Births ==
- Axel Nilsson Ryning, Lord High Admiral (died 1620)
- Erik Brahe, governor (died 1614)

== Deaths ==
- Anna Karlsdotter, landowner
- 14 April - Laurentius Andreae, Protestant clergyman (born 1470)
- 19 April - Olaus Petri, Protestant clergyman (born 1493)
