= Anna Moroni (educator) =

Italian educator (1613–1675)

Anna Moroni (1613–1675) was an Italian educator.

Anna Moroni originally worked as a washer woman in Rome. However, she had difficulty in keeping her assignments, reportedly, because of her beauty, as beautiful women were discriminated against by women employers, who normally hired the female servants. Outside of domestic work, prostitution was almost the only way for a poor woman to support herself in Rome. After an illness in 1646, she became very religious and was given Camillo Berlinsani as her confessor. In 1662, she was given permission by the church to open a home and school to teach handicrafts to poor girls and women who had failed to marry or find employment as domestic servants and were left with prostitution or beggary to support themselves. Her school was unusual in Italy, where schools for girls were normally founded and managed by nuns rather than secular women like Moroni. Her school was protected by the church and was in the 18th-century transformed in to an order.
