= Brita Rosladin =

Swedish noblewoman

Brita Rosladin (1626–1675) was a politically influential Swedish noblewoman. She is known for her supplicant activity which she managed through her contacts and marriage to the Lord High Treasurer of Sweden, Sten Nilsson Bielke.

She was the daughter of Fritz Petrovitj Rosladin and Christina Posse. She married Sten Nilsson Bielke in 1655, and became the mother of Ture Bielke (1655–1717).

Brita Rosladin was considered greatly influential within the political elite in Sweden of her day and was known to be a person to whom supplicants could turn to in issues which required help from the highest officials of the realm. She was a dominant figure in her family: she managed the family economy and had, according to Lorenzo Magalotti, so much influence over her husband that he was not left with much power in his own home. According to the Austrian Imperial envoy von Sternberg, the only thing necessary for anyone who wished to have something from the Lord High Treasurer was to bribe his wife. There are few details about the petitions she accepted and the supplicants she helped, but it was reported that she normally was met with success when accepting a petition. One example was in 1674 when she and Maria Euphrosyne of Zweibrücken were both engaged by Catharina Wallenstedt to recommend her husband for an office.
