= Margareta Beijer =

- Born: 1625
- Died: 1675 (aged 49–50)
- Spouse: Johan Beijer

Margareta Beijer (1625–1675) was the managing director of the Swedish Post Office, Postverket from 1669 until 1673. She was the fourth director of the Swedish Post Office, and the second female postmaster in Sweden after Gese Wechel, entitled Sveriges rikes postmästarinna (Postmistress of the Swedish Realm). She succeeded her spouse, Johan von Beijer, after his death in 1669.

From 1637 until 1722, eight percent (or 40) of the postmasters in Sweden were female. Women were excluded from service in the new regulation of 1722, and allowed again in 1863.
