= 1714 in Sweden =

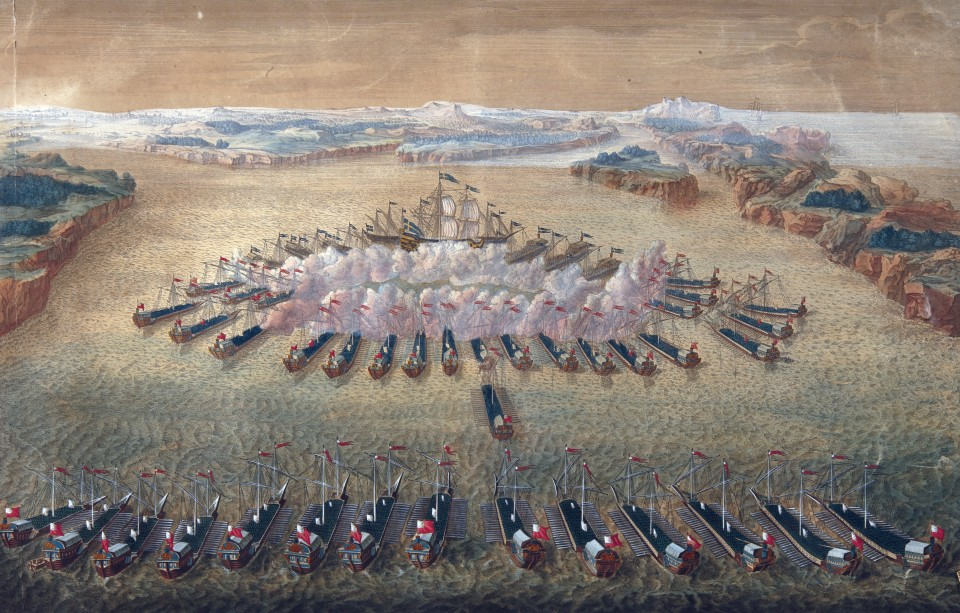

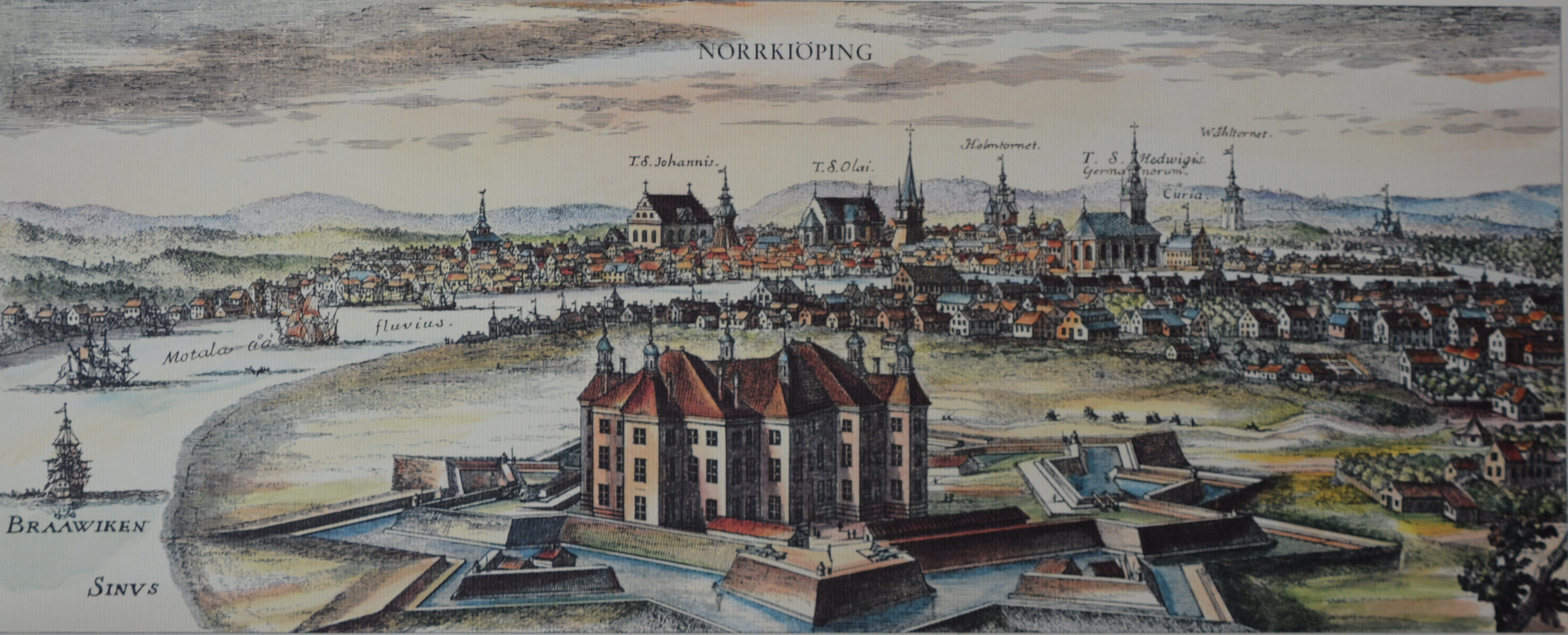
Norrköping 1714

Events from the year 1714 in Sweden

== Incumbents ==
- Monarch – Charles XII

== Events ==
- 9 February - Russian victory at the Battle of Storkyro. As a result, all of Finland fell under Russian military occupation for the rest of the war, a seven-year period of hardship known in Finland as the Great Wrath.
- 7 August - Battle of Gangut
- - Creation of the Stockholm County.
- - The Anna Jöransdotter case.

== Births ==
- 9 January - Elisabeth Stierncrona, writer (died 1769)
- 21 April - Anna Maria Hilfeling, miniaturist (died 1783)
- 31 October - Hedvig Taube, royal mistress (died 1744)
- 25 December - Israel Acrelius, priest (died 1800)

== Deaths ==
- 17 April – Haquin Spegel, author and hymn writer (born 1645)
- 19 April – Cornelius Anckarstierna, admiral (born 1655)
- – Hedvig Eleonora Stenbock, courtier (born 1658)
