= 1783 in Sweden =

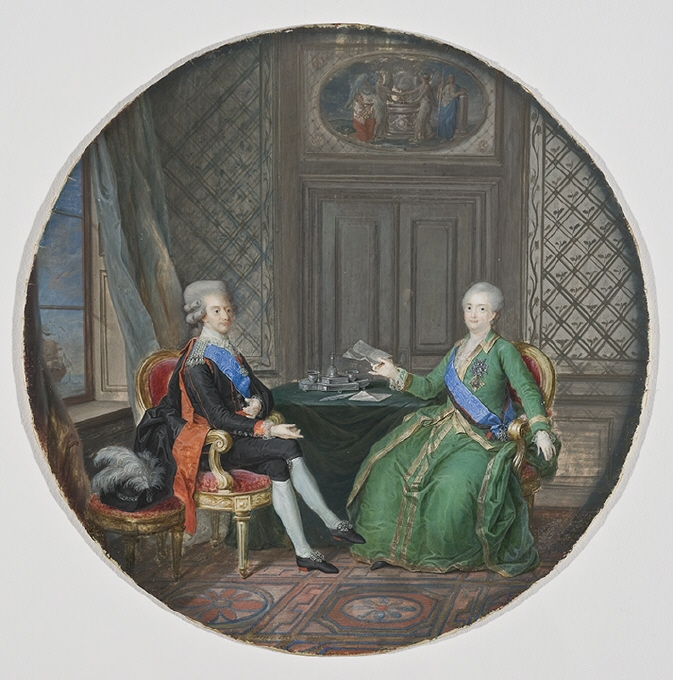
Catherine II and Gustav III

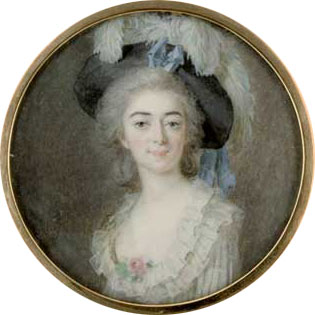
Giovanna Bassi.

Events from the year 1783 in Sweden

== Incumbents ==
- Monarch – Gustav III

== Events ==
- - Creation of the Walhalla-orden
- - Treaty of Amity and Commerce (United States–Sweden)
- June - Gustav III has plans to conquer the Danish province of Norway, and meet with Catherine the Great in Finland in an unsuccessful attempt to persuade her to end the Russian-Danish alliance.
- - Norrköping jungfrustift is founded.
- 27 September - Gustav III begun his trip to Italy and France.
- - Bacchi Tempel, by Carl Michael Bellman
- - Giovanna Bassi is engaged at the Royal Swedish Opera in Stockholm.

== Births ==
- 12 January - Erik Gustaf Geijer, writer (died 1847)
- 3 September - Sophie Karsten, ballerina (died 1862)
- 22 October - Maria Johanna Görtz, artist (died 1853)
- 18 December - Johan Niclas Byström, sculptor (died 1848)

== Deaths ==
- Brita Ryy, educator (born 1725)
- 26 May – Anna Maria Hilfeling, miniaturist (born 1713)
- date unknown - Maria Katarina Öhrn, opera singer and actress (born 1756)
- 1 November - Carl Linnaeus the Younger, naturalist (born 1741)
- Helena Escholin, vicar's wife (born 1713)
- Françoise-Éléonore Villain, actor (born 1761)
