= 1725 in Sweden =

- Decades: 1700s; 1710s; 1720s; 1730s; 1740s
- See also: Other events of 1725; Timeline of Swedish history

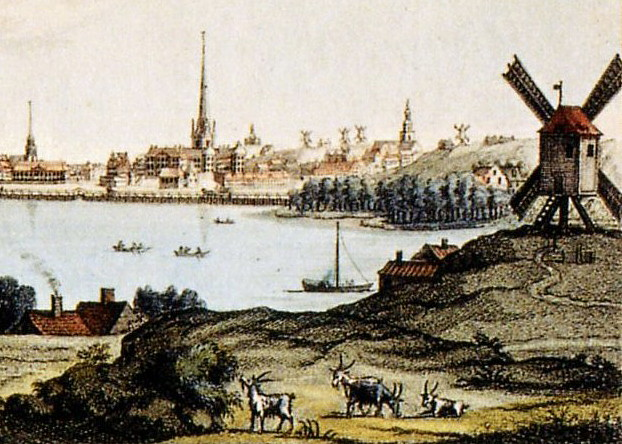
Lilla Munkan 1725

Events from the year 1725 in Sweden

== Incumbents ==
- Monarch – Frederick I

== Events ==
- Public bath houses are banned to prevent the spread of syphilis.
- The new building of the Danviken Hospital is completed.
- Inauguration of the Finnish Church, Stockholm.
- Young sailor Erik Persson Ångerman is abducted and enslaved by corsairs in Algiers on May 10th. His wife appeals to King Frederick I to gather money to buy his freedom. The king grants her request.
- Swedish count and politician Carl Gustaf Tessin is appointed ambassador to Vienna and becomes prominent in the Riksdag of the Estates.

== Births ==
- February 5 – Anna Maria Rückerschöld, cookery book author and social critic (died 1805)
- Brita Ryy, educator (died 1783)
- Anna Maria Brandel, industrialist (died 1799)

== Deaths ==
- April 14 – Maria Romberg, convicted murderer (born 1697)
- May 23 – Anna Maria Schmilau, tapestry artist
- May 31 – Erik Carlsson Sjöblad, governor and admiral (born 1647)
