= 1713 in Sweden =

1713 (MDCCXIII) was a year that started on a sunday in the Gregorian calendar.

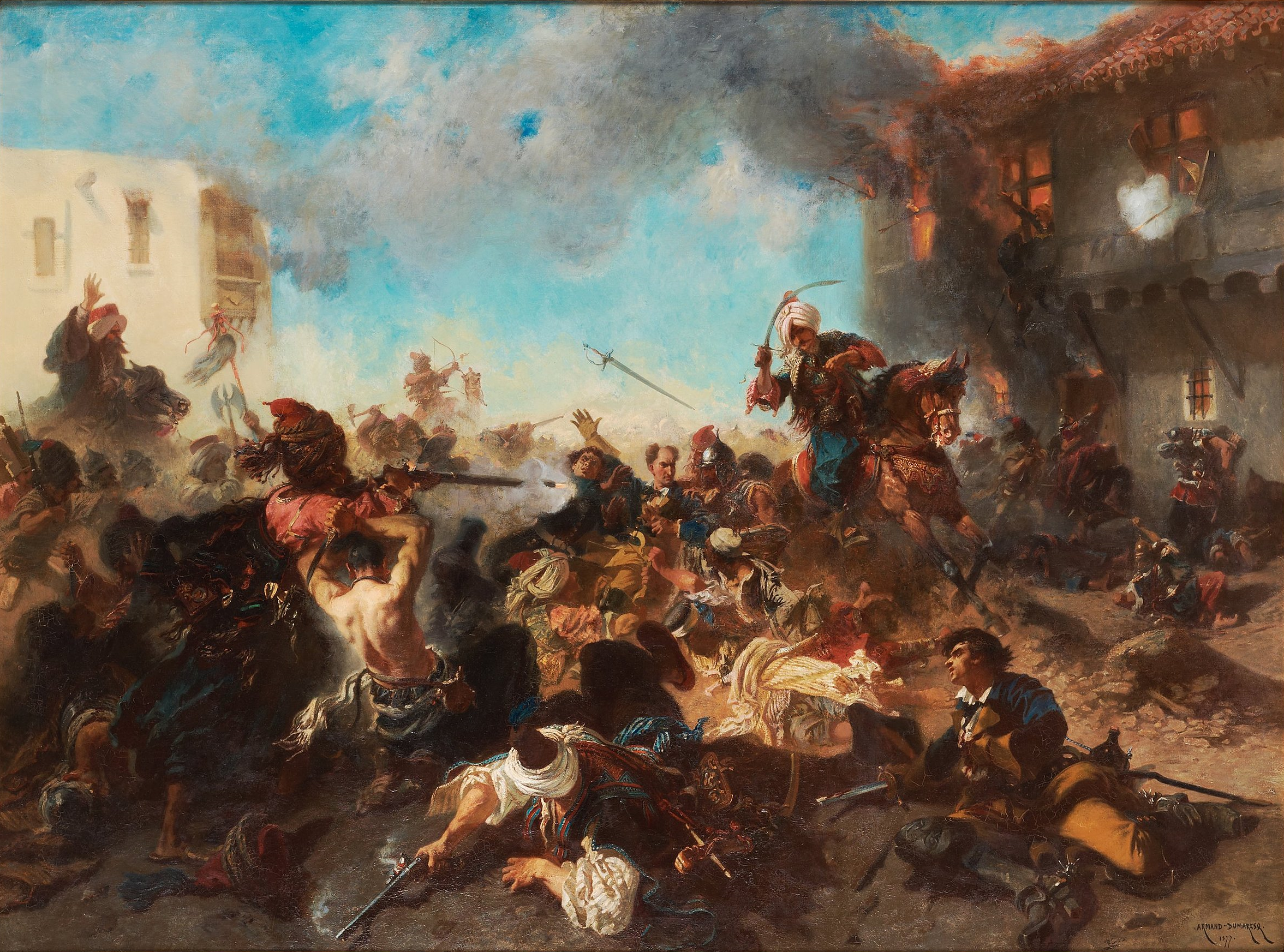
Battle of Bender 1713

Events from the year 1713 in Sweden.

== Incumbents ==
- Monarch – Charles XII

== Events ==
- 1 February - Skirmish at Bender.
- February - Siege of Tönning
- 8–11 May - Russian attack on Helsingfors (Helsinki).
- - Russian victory at the Battle of Pälkäne.
- 2 November - Princess Ulrika Eleonora appointed regent of Sweden in her brothers absence.
- - The Great Northern War plague outbreak reach Lund, Malmö and Ystad.

== Births ==
- 20 February - Anna Maria Elvia, writer (died 1784)
- - Anna Maria Hilfeling, miniaturist (died 1783)
- – Brita Sophia De la Gardie, amateur actress and culture personality (died 1797)
- Helena Escholin, vicar's wife (died 1783)

== Deaths ==
- Johan Runius, swedish author (from Larvs socken in Västergötland) died 1 june in 1713
- Jean Grossaint De la Roche-yon, spy (died 1769)
