= 1848 in Sweden =

- Decades: 1820s; 1830s; 1840s; 1850s; 1860s
- See also: Other events of 1848; Timeline of Swedish history

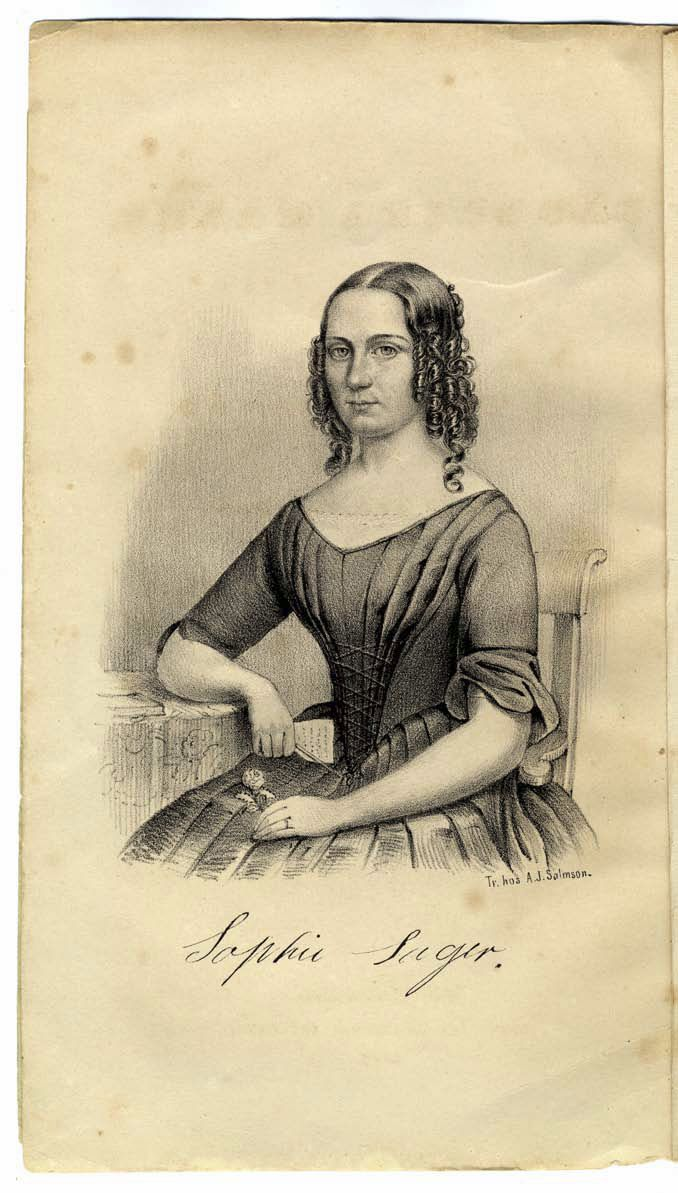
Sophie Sager

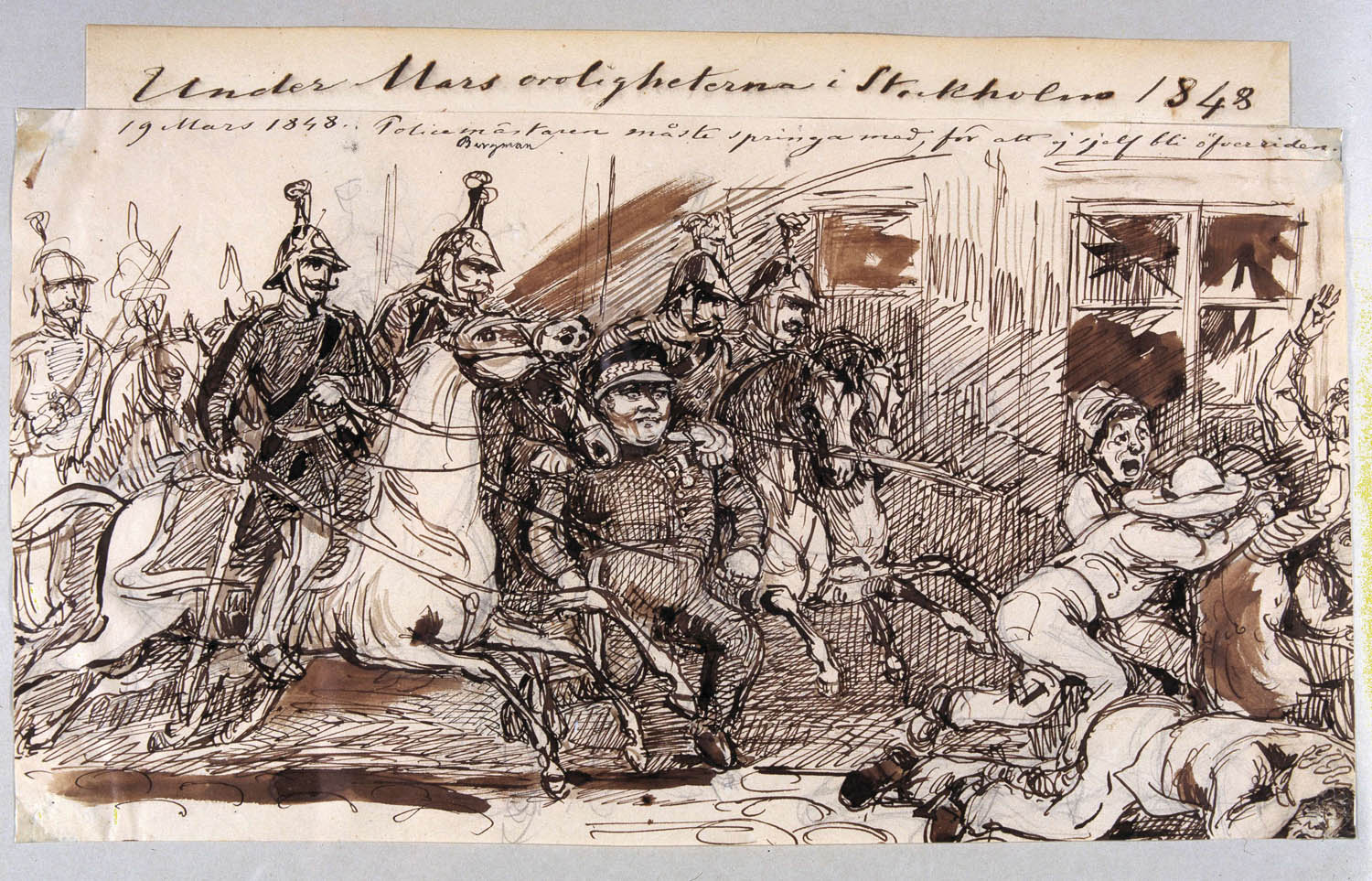

Events from the year 1848 in Sweden

== Incumbents ==
- Monarch – Oscar I.

== Events ==
- 18-21 March - A series of riots, Marsoroligheterna, takes place in the capital inspired by the Revolutions of 1848
- - The Tales of Ensign Stål is published.
- - The Cause célèbre of Sophie Sager.
- - HDK (school) is established.
- - Cecilia Fryxell open her first school: her schools is to become influential in the education of females.
- - A new type of ferry traffic, with boats propelled by hand-operated paddle wheels instead of boats managed by oars by the Rower woman, are introduced in Stockholm.
- - Banditen : berättelse by August Blanche
- - Catharina Månsdotter by Wilhelmina Stålberg
- - Fänrik Ståls sägner by Johan Ludvig Runeberg
- - Första älskarinnan by August Blanche
- - Hittebarnet by August Blanche

== Births ==
- 2 May – Harald Hjärne, historian (died 1922)

== Deaths ==
- 13 February – Sophie von Knorring, writer (born 1797)
- 16 February – Sophie Stebnowska, opera singer and harpsichordist
- 13 March – Johan Niclas Byström, sculptor (born 1783)
- 7 August - Jöns Jacob Berzelius, chemist (born 1779)
- Gustafva Röhl, educator (born 1798)
- Katarina Erlandsdotter textile artist (born 1771)
