= 1797 in Sweden =

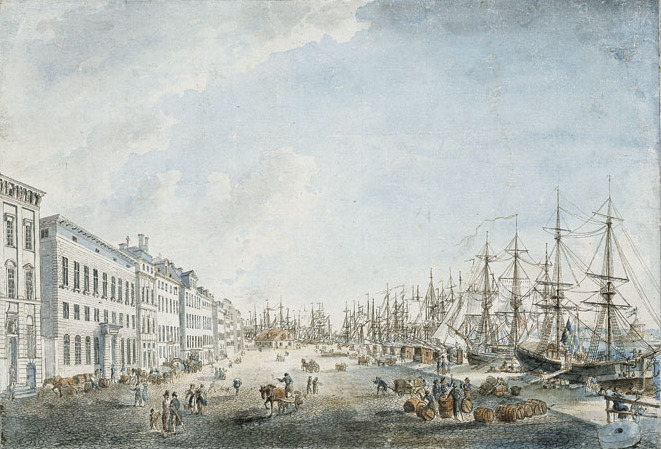
Skeppsbron cumelin

Events from the year 1797 in Sweden

== Incumbents ==
- Monarch – Gustav IV Adolf

== Events ==
- 6 October - Frederica of Baden and Gustav IV Adolf are married by proxy in Stralsund.
- 31 October - Frederica of Baden and Gustav IV Adolf’s marriage is solemnized in Stockholm’s Slottskyrkan.

== Births ==
- 24 March – Joséphine of Leuchtenberg, later Queen of Sweden and Norway as the wife of Oscar I (d. 1876)
- 4 July - Jacquette Löwenhielm, royal mistress (died 1839)
- 15 July - Kloka Anna, cunning woman and medium (died 1860)
- 10 September – Karl Gustaf Mosander, chemist (died 1858)
- 28 September – Sophie von Knorring, writer (died 1848)
- Anna Göransdotter, textile artist (died 1867)

== Deaths ==
- - Christina Elisabeth Carowsky, painter (born 1745)
- - Brita Sophia De la Gardie, actress and socialite (born 1713)
