= 1658 in Sweden =

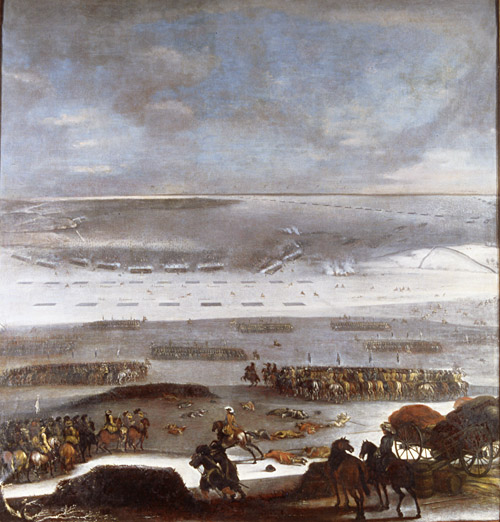
The Swedish troops cross the ice to Zealand, 1658: painting by Johan Philip Lemke (1631–1711)

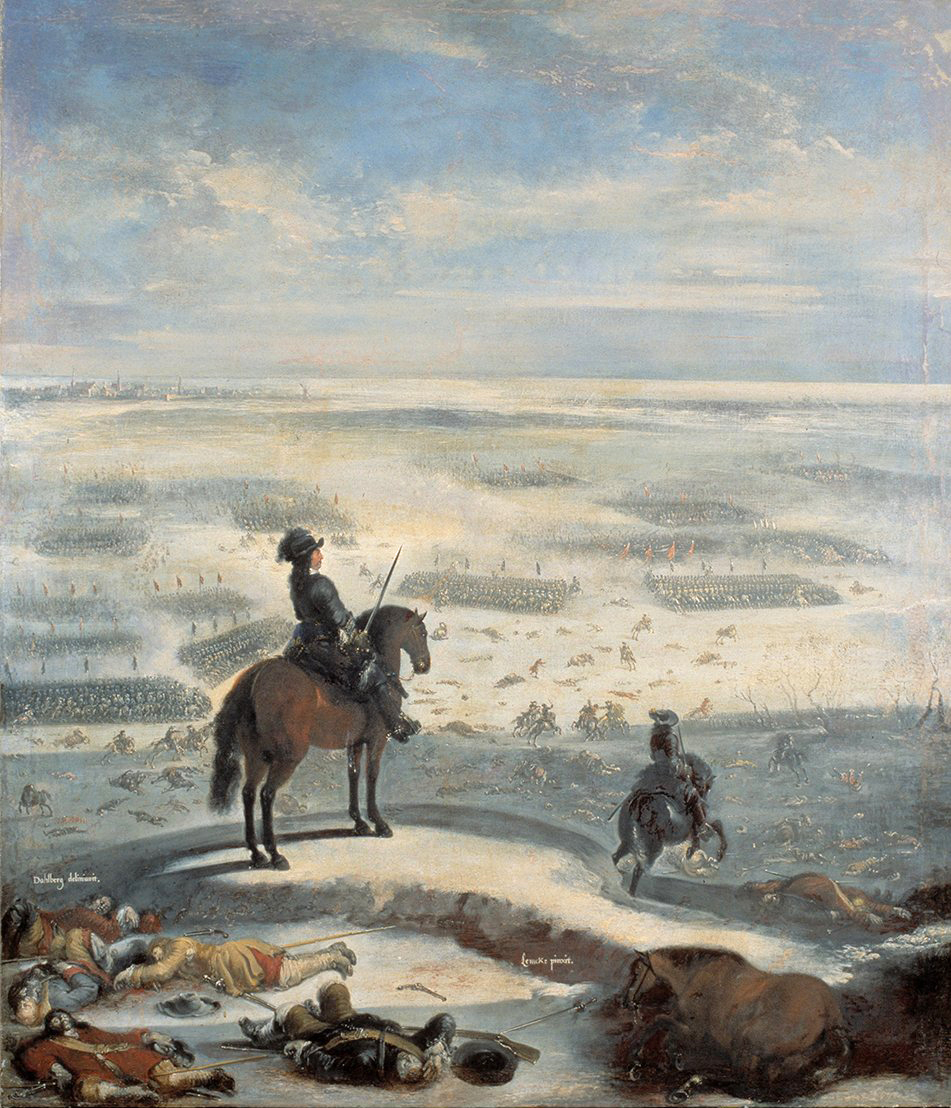
The crossing of the Great Belt: painting by Johan Philip Lemke

Events from the year 1658 in Sweden

== Incumbents ==
- Monarch – Charles X Gustav

== Events ==
- Battle of Kobron
- Battle of Tybrindvig
- February 6 – Swedish troops of Charles X Gustav of Sweden cross the Great Belt (Storebælt) in Denmark over frozen sea.
- February 26 – The peace between Sweden and Denmark is concluded in Roskilde by the Treaty of Roskilde, under which Denmark is forced to cede significant territory.
- Swedish occupation of Bornholm
- Armistice between Sweden and Russia
- Sweden declares war on Denmark.
- Swedish occupation of Valmiera
- Sweden invades Denmark.
- Swedish siege of Copenhagen
- Sweden invades Courland.
- Swedish occupation of Kronborg
- Swedish occupation of Marienburg
- Sweden invades Norway.
- Swedish occupation of Courland
- Sweden takes Mitau and captures the Duke of Courland.
- Sweden pillages Amager.
- Battle of the Sound; the siege of Copenhagen is over.
- The end of the Swedish occupation of Jylland
- The end of the Swedish occupation of Als
- The end of the Swedish occupation of Bornholm
- The end of the Swedish occupation of Trondheim
- The end of the Swedish occupation of Thorn
- Herkules by Georg Stiernhielm
- Thet Swenska Språketz Klagemål by Skogekär Bergbo

== Births ==
- Hedvig Eleonora Stenbock, courtier (died 1714)

== Deaths ==
- 8 December - Johan Printzensköld, army officer (born 1615)
- Marketta Punasuomalainen, cunning woman and alleged witch (born 1600)
