= 1726 in Sweden =

- Years in Sweden: 1723 1724 1725 1726 1727 1728 1729
- Centuries: 17th century · 18th century · 19th century
- Decades: 1690s 1700s 1710s 1720s 1730s 1740s 1750s
- Years: 1723 1724 1725 1726 1727 1728 1729

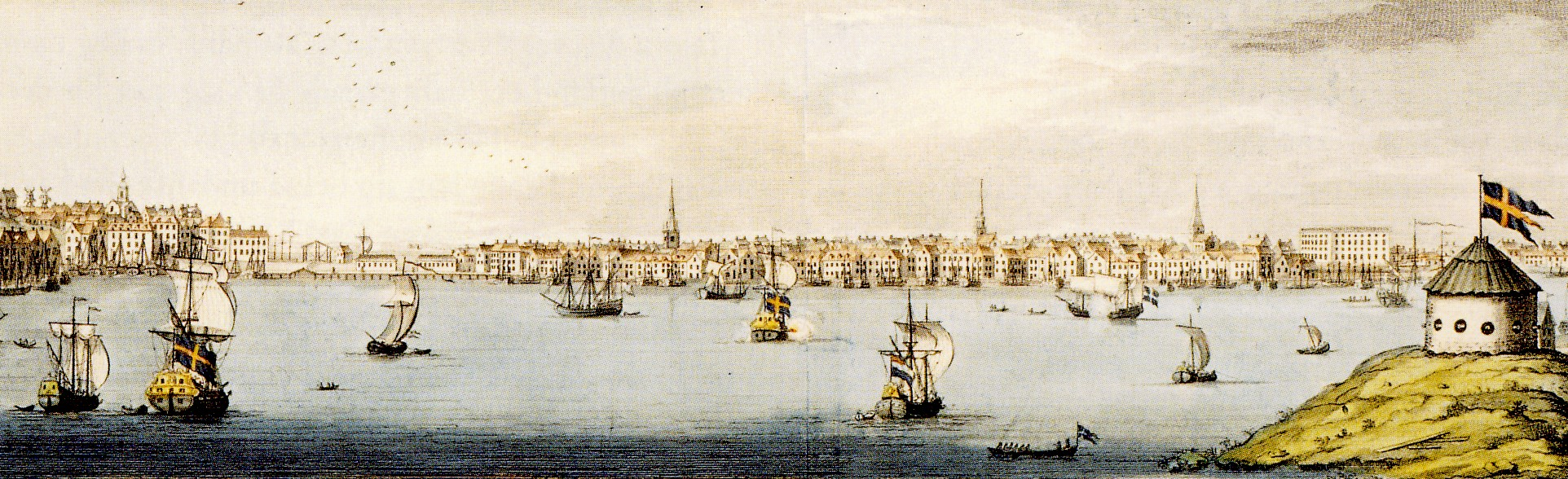
Skeppsbron 1725

Events from the year 1726 in Sweden

== Incumbents ==
- Monarch – Frederick I

== Events ==
- 12 January - Conventicle Act (Sweden)
- 26 October - Women are formally allowed employment at the Kungliga Hovkapellet, the first officially employed females being Judith Fischer and Sophia Schröder.
- - Johann Konrad Dippel visit Sweden, after which Radical Pietism spreads rapidly.
- - The first Steam engine created in Sweden.
- - The Ulrika Eleonora Stålhammar case.

== Births ==
- 11 February - Margaretha Donner, business person (died 1774)
