= 1769 in Sweden =

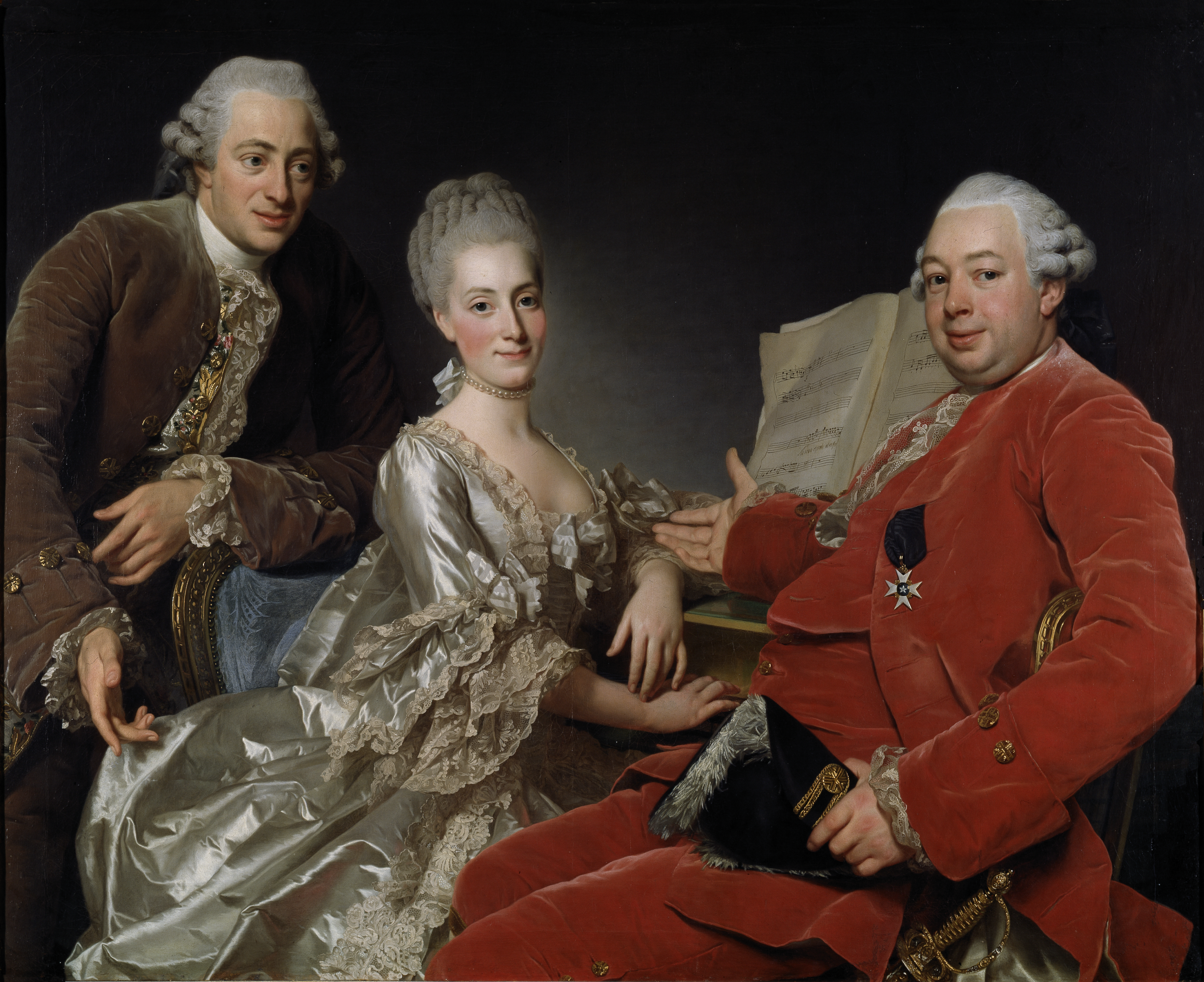
John Jennings, His Brother and Sister-in-Law by Alexander Roslin, 1769

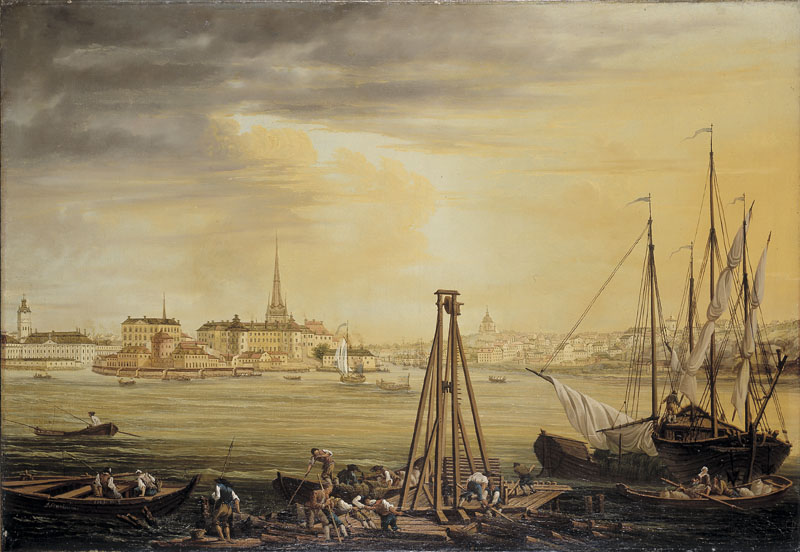
Sevenbom, Riddarholmen

Events from the year 1769 in Sweden

== Incumbents ==
- Monarch – Adolf Frederick

== Events ==
- May - The Riksdag of the Estates assemble in Norrköping, the Caps (party)-government fall, and the Riksdag move to Stockholm.
- 30 May – Claes Ekeblad appointed Privy Council Chancellery.
- October – Prussia, Russia and Denmark form an alliance in order to preserve the current Swedish political system to keep Sweden unstable.
- Swea rikes historia by Sven Lagerbring

== Births ==
- 2 February - Maria Franck, actress (died 1847)
- 19 August - Ulrica Eleonora Rålamb, politically active countess and spy (died 1847)
- date unknown - Ebba Morman, actress (died 1802)

== Deaths ==
- 5 February – Cajsa Warg, cook book writer (born 1703)
- 28 June - Elisabeth Stierncrona, writer (born 1714)
- Jean Grossaint De la Roche-yon, spy (born 1713)
