= Överlida =

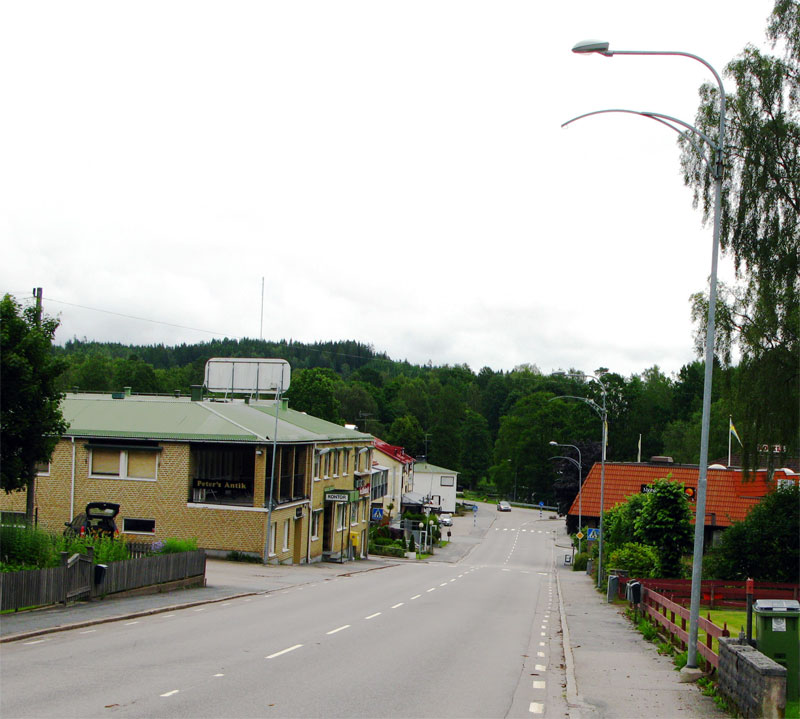
- Överlida in 2012

- Location within Västra Götaland Location within Sweden
- Coordinates: 57°21′N 12°53′E
- Country: Sweden
- Province: Västergötland
- County: Västra Götaland County
- Municipality: Svenljunga Municipality

Area
  - Total: 0.90 km^{2} (0.35 sq mi)

Population (31 December 2010)
  - Total: 525
  - Density: 580/km^{2} (1,500/sq mi)
- Time zone: UTC+1 (CET)
  - Summer (DST): UTC+2 (CEST)

Överlida is a locality situated in Svenljunga Municipality, Västra Götaland County, Sweden with 525 inhabitants in 2010.
