= Mjöbäck =

- Location within Västra Götaland Location within Sweden
- Coordinates: 57°19′N 12°52′E
- Country: Sweden
- Province: Västergötland
- County: Västra Götaland County
- Municipality: Svenljunga Municipality

Area
  - Total: 0.70 km^{2} (0.27 sq mi)

Population (31 December 2010)
  - Total: 294
  - Density: 422/km^{2} (1,090/sq mi)
- Time zone: UTC+1 (CET)
  - Summer (DST): UTC+2 (CEST)

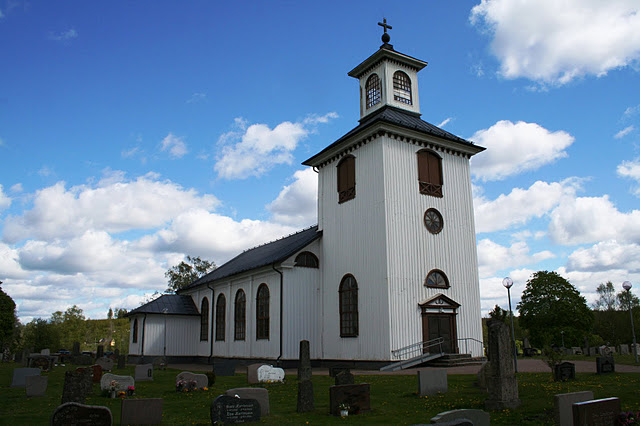
Mjöbäcks kyrka

Mjöbäck is a locality situated in Svenljunga Municipality, Västra Götaland County, Sweden with 294 inhabitants in 2010.
