= Henricus Eolenius =

Henricus Eolenius (d. after 1661), was an alleged Finnish sorcerer.

== Early life ==
Eolenious was a student at the Royal Academy of Turku in Finland. At the university, the professor of Greek, Hebrew and theology, Martin Stodius, had been accused in 1644 of making a student crazy by teaching him sorcery; he was freed by the consistorium of the university, but fired, and in 1661, Eolenius was suspected as his apprentice.

Eolenius had learned Arabic, which according to the vice chancellor of the university, Johannes Terserus, the bishop of Turku, was a sign of a pact with the Devil. He was judged guilty of witchcraft and Devil's pact and sentenced to death, but the Swedish governor Per Brahe demanded that the sentence be appealed to a higher court, the Court of Appeal of Turku where Eolenius were acquitted. He was, however, forced to leave the university as not to embarrass the management.

The theological university of Turku, which educated many priests, was a place for many discussions of the nature of witchcraft, and such accusations were common in the city in the 17th century, driven by the university consistorium, though they seldom led to execution; in 1665, the consistorium accused Elisabeth Nilsdotter, widow of a professor, of poisoning the wife of a member of the consistorium, Bishop Johannes Gezelius, but she was acquitted and received money for slander. In 1670, student, Isac Gunnerus was accused of having been one of the apprentices of Stodius; he was freed but expelled by the consistorium.

== See also ==
- Marketta Punasuomalainen
