= Vadstena adliga jungfrustift =

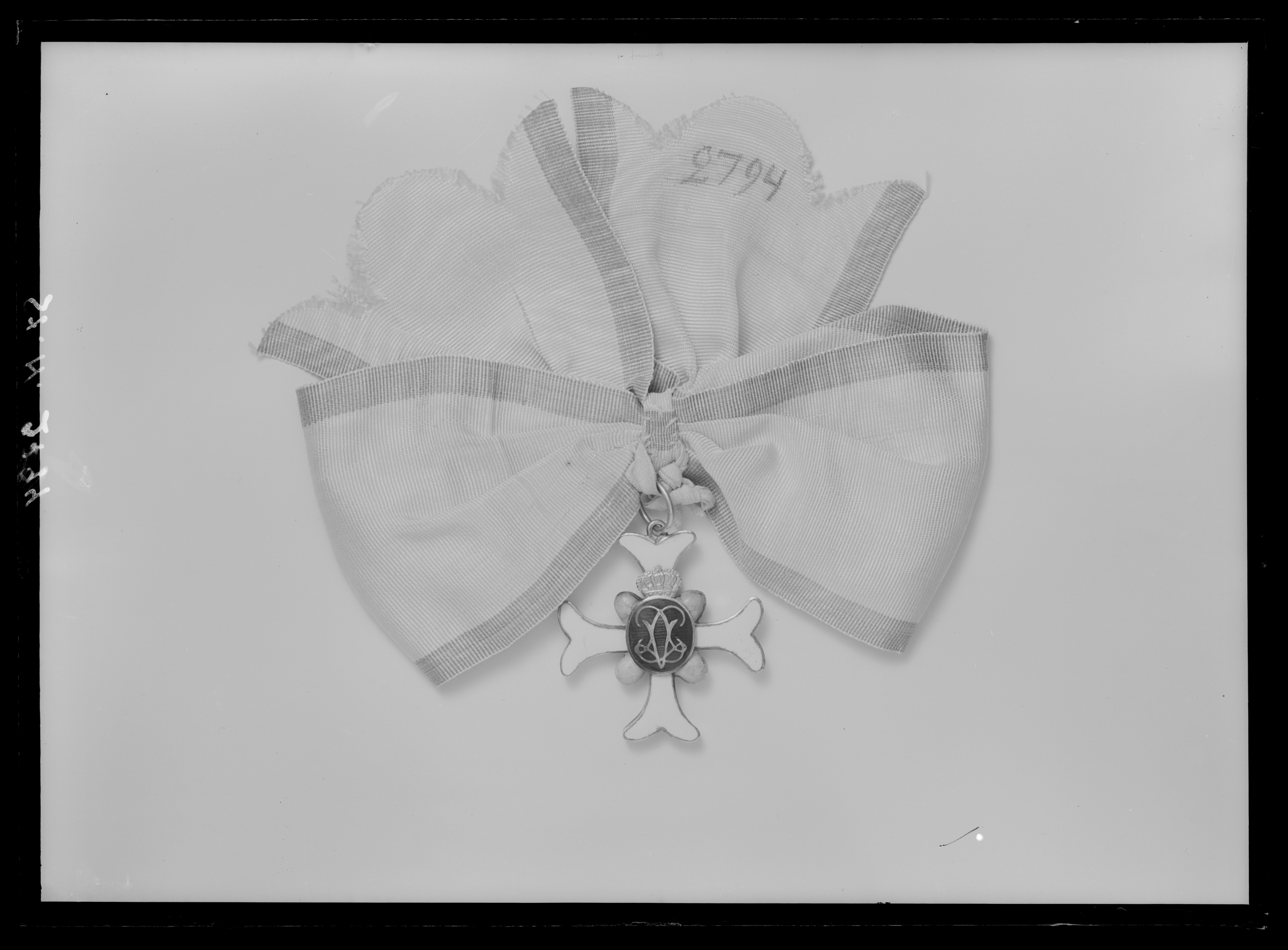
Vadstena adliga jungfrustifts tecken - Livrustkammaren - 77598

Vadstena adliga jungfrustift or VAJS, was a Swedish foundation to support unmarried female nobles.

The foundation was made upon the suggestion of Carl Wilhelm Cederhielm in 1739. The original purpose was the foundation of a Protestant convent for unmarried female members of the nobility at Vadstena Castle. It was to be both a school for girls from the nobility, as well as a home for poor noblewomen who were unable to support themselves. This idea was never realized because of the costs. However, from 1747 onward, it started to accept members, which were given the title stiftsfröken and received an allowance from the foundation, though they never lived at the Vadstena Castle. In 1758, it was formally transformed into a fund for the support of unmarried female members of the nobility, who also used the title stiftsfröken.

Though Vadstena adliga jungfrustift never functioned as a stift, the Norrköping jungfrustift, formally a branch of the Vadstena adliga jungfrustift, did function as a stift in Norrköping from 1783 to 1796.
