= Sven Erlandsson =

Swedish artist (1768–1853)

Sven Erlandsson (1768–1853) was a Swedish artist (tapestry maker).

Son of the gardener Erland Hallberg and Anna Maria Kristoffersdotter and the brother of Katarina Erlandsdotter (1771-1848) and Lisa Erlandsdotter (1774–1854); the three siblings all became known as artists, and are counted among the most prominent within their craft in 18th-century Sweden. He made bonadsmålning, a Swedish art form, which is a type of painted tapestry of textile used for decoration, largely among the peasantry.

He lived his entire life in the countryside at Mårdaklev in Älvsborgs län.
