= Maid of the Bedchamber =

Court office for a lady-in-waiting in several European courts

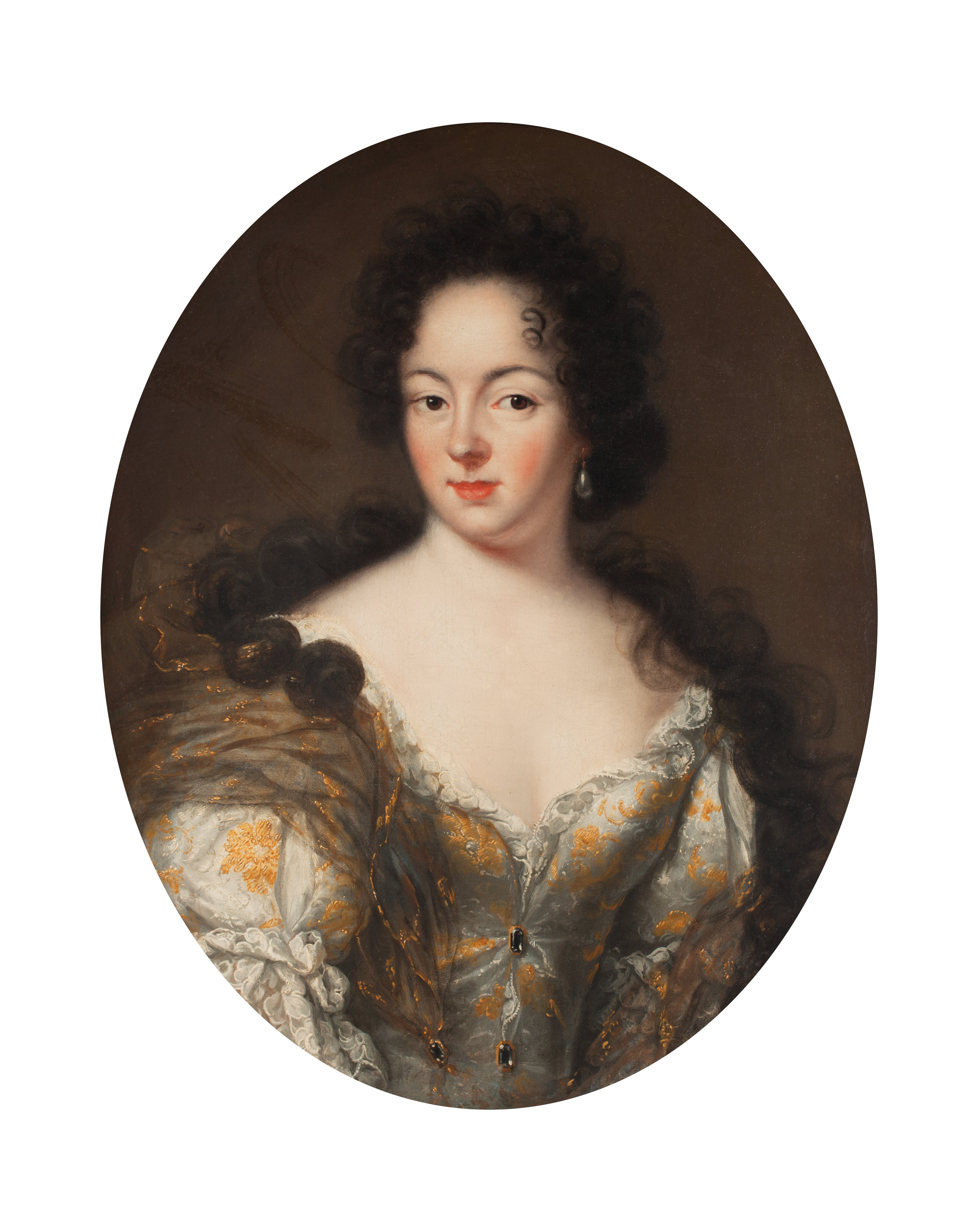
Hedvig Eleonora Stenbock, kammarfröken to queen Hedvig Eleonora.

A Maid of the Bedchamber (Danish: Kammerfrøken; German: Kammerfräulein; Russian: kamer-devitsa; Swedish: kammarfröken) was a court office for a lady-in-waiting in several European courts.

The office was that of maid of honour of higher rank, or a senior maid of honour. While there was normally several maids of honour (Danish: Hoffrøken; German: Hoffräulein; Swedish: Hovfröken), there was normally only one Maid of the Bedchamber. She was in rank between the maids of honour and the married ladies-in-waiting. As the German court model originally included only a Chief Court Mistress and a group of maids of honours, she was often second in rank of the ladies-in-waiting between them. The Maid of the Bedchamber was an office of high status selected from nobility. She had often been a maid of honour before she was promoted, because of birth or royal favor. Her tasks were essentially the same as the tasks of the maids of honour, though they were of higher status. In Sweden, the kammarfröken was the deputy of the överhovmästarinna whenever she was absent until the introduction of the office statsfru in 1774. As the maids of honour, a Maid of the Bedchamber retired from her office upon marriage.

== See also ==
- Dame d'atour
