= Svenljunga =

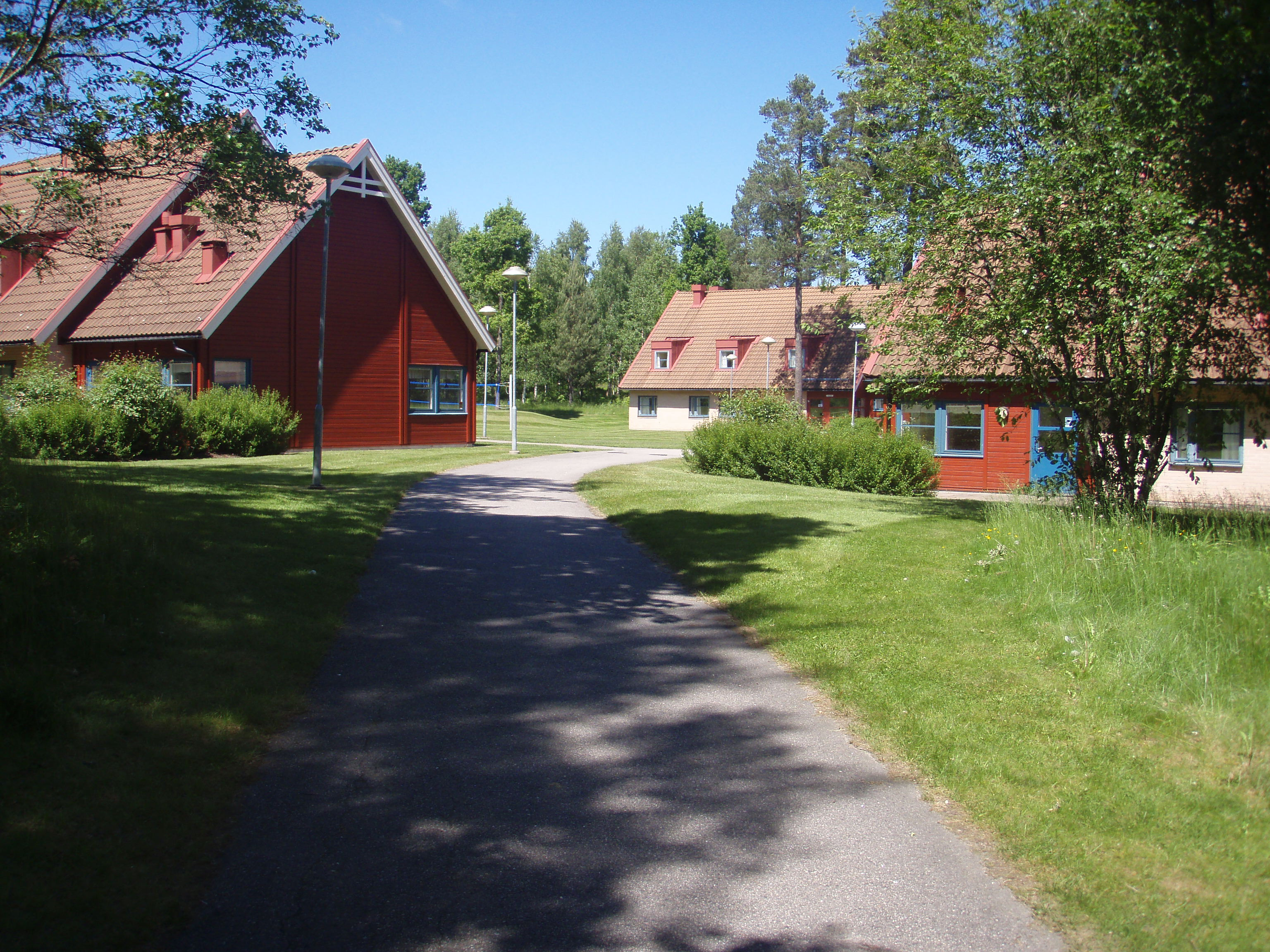
- Svenljunga agriculture boarding secondary school

- Location within Västra Götaland Location within Sweden
- Coordinates: 57°30′N 13°07′E
- Country: Sweden
- Province: Västergötland
- County: Västra Götaland County
- Municipality: Svenljunga Municipality

Area
  - Total: 4.38 km^{2} (1.69 sq mi)

Population (31 December 2010)
  - Total: 3,418
  - Density: 781/km^{2} (2,020/sq mi)
- Time zone: UTC+1 (CET)
  - Summer (DST): UTC+2 (CEST)

Svenljunga is a locality and the seat of Svenljunga Municipality, Västra Götaland County, Sweden with 3,418 inhabitants in 2010.
