= Lisa Erlandsdotter =

Swedish artist (1774–1854)

Lisa Erlandsdotter (1774–1854) was a Swedish artist (tapestry maker).

Daughter of the gardener Erland Hallberg and Anna Maria Kristoffersdotter and the sister of Sven Erlandsson (1768–1853) and Katarina Erlandsdotter (1771–1848); the three siblings all became known as artists, and are counted among the most prominent within their craft in 18th-century Sweden. Lisa made Bonadsmålning, a Swedish art form, which is a type of painted tapestry of textile used for decoration, largely among the peasantry. She worked with her brother Sven and her sister Katarina, but where particularly known for her motives of weddings and flowers. She married Johannes Gunnarsson in 1802.

Lisa lived her entire life in the countryside at Mårdaklev in Älvsborgs län.
