= 1655 in Sweden =

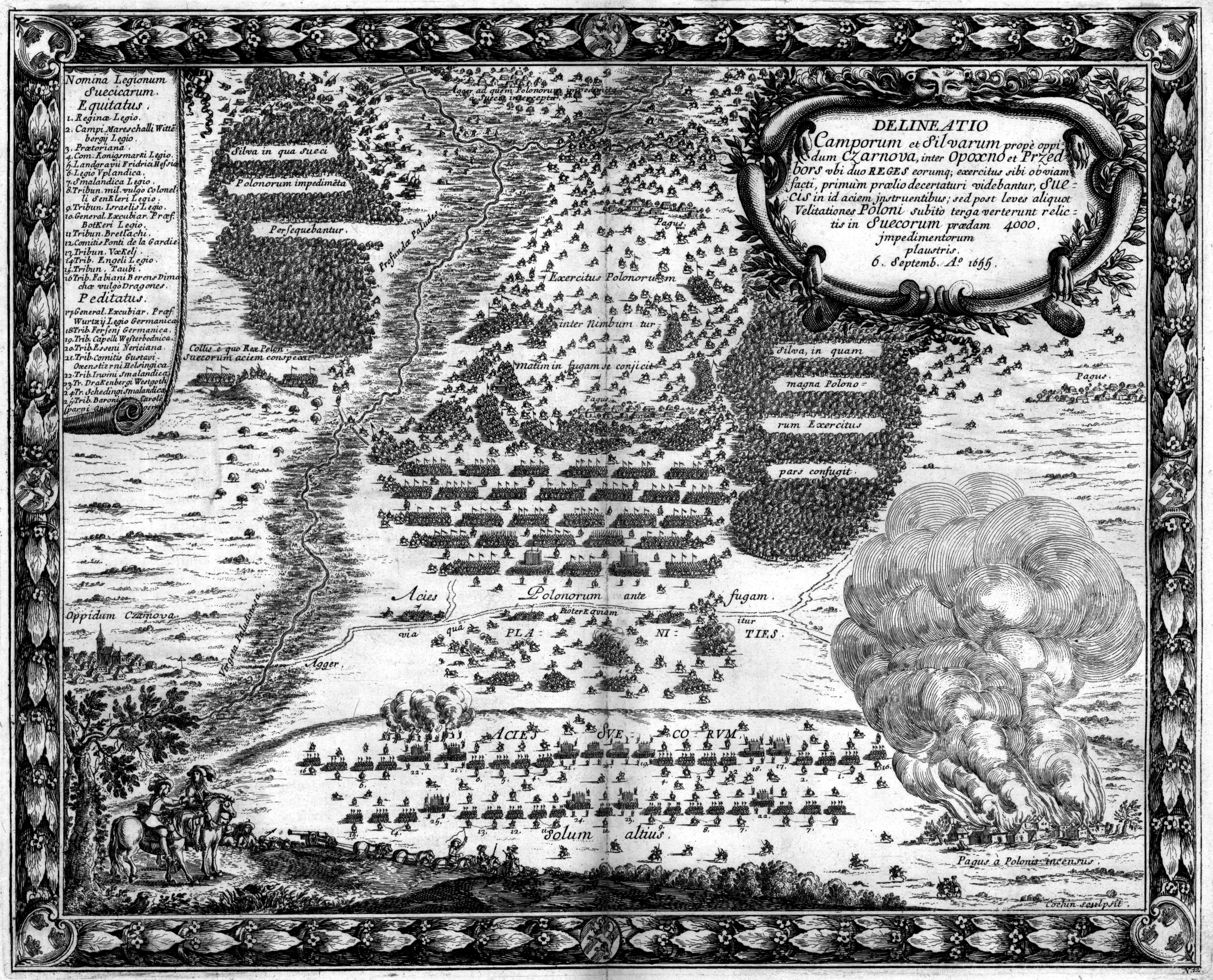

Events from the year 1655 in Sweden

== Incumbents ==
- Monarch – Charles X Gustav

== Events ==
- The King summon the 1655 Riksdag and introduces a Reduction (Sweden) of a quarter of all lands granted to the nobility from the crown since 1632.
- Deluge (history)
- 23 August - Battle of Sobota
- 16 September - Battle of Żarnów
- September 20 – September 30 - Battle of Nowy Dwór Mazowiecki
- 3 October - Battle of Wojnicz

== Births ==
- January - Cornelius Anckarstjerna, admiral (died 1714)
- Charles XI of Sweden, monarch (died 1697)
- David von Krafft, painter (died 1724)

== Deaths ==
- 28 March - Maria Eleonora of Brandenburg, queen dowager (born 1595)
- Anna Ovena Hoyer, writer (born 1584)
- Christian Thum, actor and theater director (birth year unknown)
