= Greta Donner =

Swedish businesswoman

Anna Margaretha "Greta" Donner (née Lyhtberg; 11 February 1726 – 24 September 1774) was a Swedish businessperson. She was known as "Donner Mum", "Madam Donner", and "Madam Herr Donner" ("Milady Lord Donner").

== Life ==
Born in Visby, Sweden to merchants Mathias Lythberg and Johanna Wihadi, Greta was given a good education and was active as her father's business assistant. She had six siblings, but only two of them lived to adulthood.

In 1744, she married the German merchant Jürgen Hinrich Donner from Lübeck. Greta was constantly pregnant during her marriage, giving birth to five children in just six years, although only two of them survived infancy, namely Georg Mathias and Jacob Niclas. She and her husband settled in Visby on Gotland in 1746; they bought a building, where they founded an empire of import and export with Germany and Great Britain. The building is now known as ”The Donner House”, and the square by which the building is located was to be known as ”Donner's place”. Greta was the company's accountant.

When she became a widow in 1751 at the age of just 25, she took sole control over the business as director. She made herself responsible for the export and created a merchant fleet with twenty ships. She also founded a factory on Gotland. She was appreciated by her employees and was called ”Donner Mum” by some and ”Madam Donner” by others: some of her German business-partners could not imagine a woman as the head of such a big business empire, and they sometimes called her "Madam Herr Donner" ("Milady Lord Donner").

She helped her two sons start their own business, but she did not allow them any influence in her own affairs, and she did not acquaint them with the main business until after she acquired tuberculosis, of which she died at Visby in 1774. The Donner empire expanded under her sons Georg and Jacob, both of whom included their wives in their work, but the business eventually went bankrupt in 1845.

== See also ==
- Ingela Gathenhielm
