= Norrköping jungfrustift =

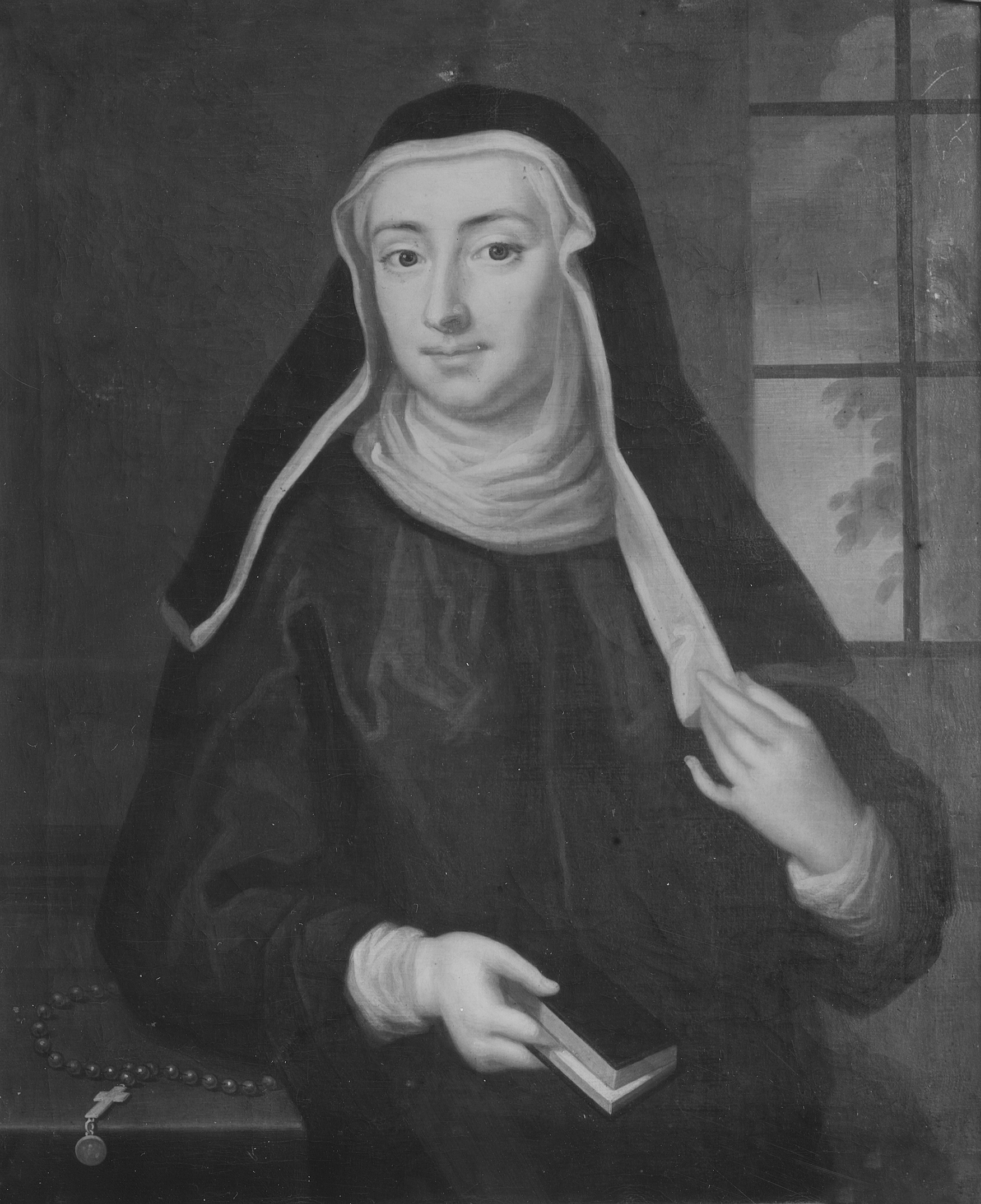
Sofia Emerentia von Delwig, 1727-1783

Norrköping adliga jungfrustift was a Swedish foundation for the support of unmarried female nobles. It functioned as a stift or Protestant convent for unmarried female nobles from 1783 to 1796, situated in the city of Norrköping. Though formally a branch of the Vadstena adliga jungfrustift, it was in fact the only stift active in Sweden.

In 1783, riksråd Carl Fredrik Scheffer decided to meet the complaints about the fact that the foundation Vadstena adliga jungfrustift, despite repeated attempts, had never managed to form any actual establishment of a Protestant convent, as had originally been the purpose. That year, he bought a house in the city in Norrköping and donated it to the Vadstena adliga jungfrustift committee, who decided to open a local branch of the convent there. Though called a local branch of the "mother convent", it was in fact the only functioning stift in Sweden, as the Vadstena adliga jungfrustift continued to function only as a foundation.

The Norrköping jungfrustift consisted of an abbess (though referred to as prioress) and six unmarried noblewomen with the title stiftsjungfru or stiftsfröken. Except for the actual members of the convent, the establishment functioned as house for various female paying guests. The abbesses were the noble widows Sofia Emerentia Gyllenborg (from 1783 to 1783) and Hedvig Christina Creutz (from 1783 to 1796).

The stift was dissolved by the foundation because of its poor finances in 1796, but the abbess and the other members were given a pension from the foundation.
