= Maria Johanna Görtz =

Swedish artist (1783–1853)

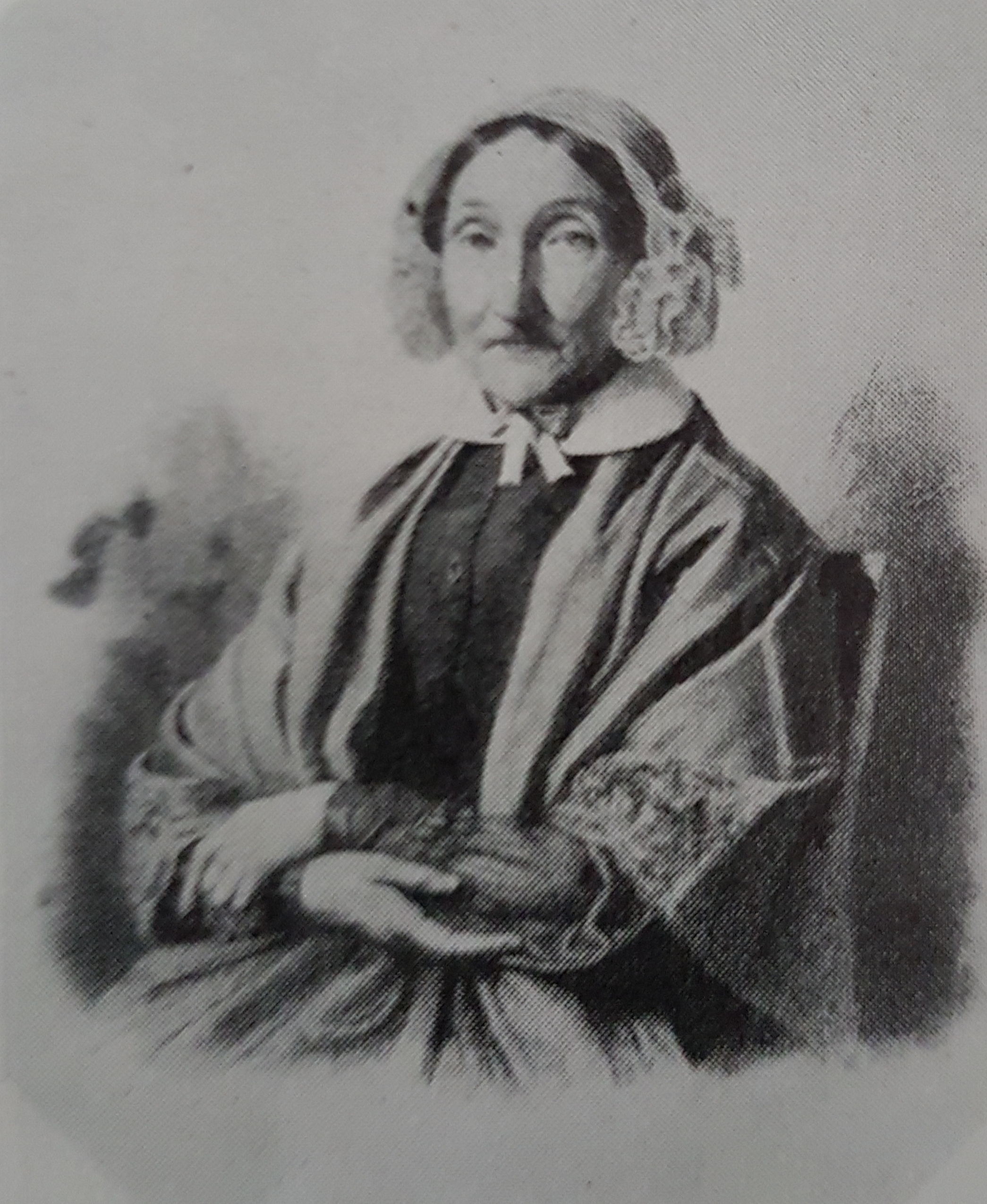
Maria Johnanna Görtz

Maria Johanna Görtz, also known as Jeanette Görtz, (1783–1853), was a Swedish artist, still life painter and drawing artist. She was a member of the Royal Swedish Academy of Arts.

Born to Cup-bearer Johan Hindrik Görtz. In the 1803 exhibition of the Academy of Arts, Maria Johanna Görtz exhibited several drawings of birds and flowers. Her work impressed the Academy, who sent her a letter of appreciation and encouragement. After having participated in another exhibition of 1804, she was elected into the Academy. In 1805, she had a third exhibition which was much talked about. Görtz continued as a very active artist, and took part in many exhibitions between 1803 and 1826. One of her most admired paintings was one of dead birds.
