= 1727 in Sweden =

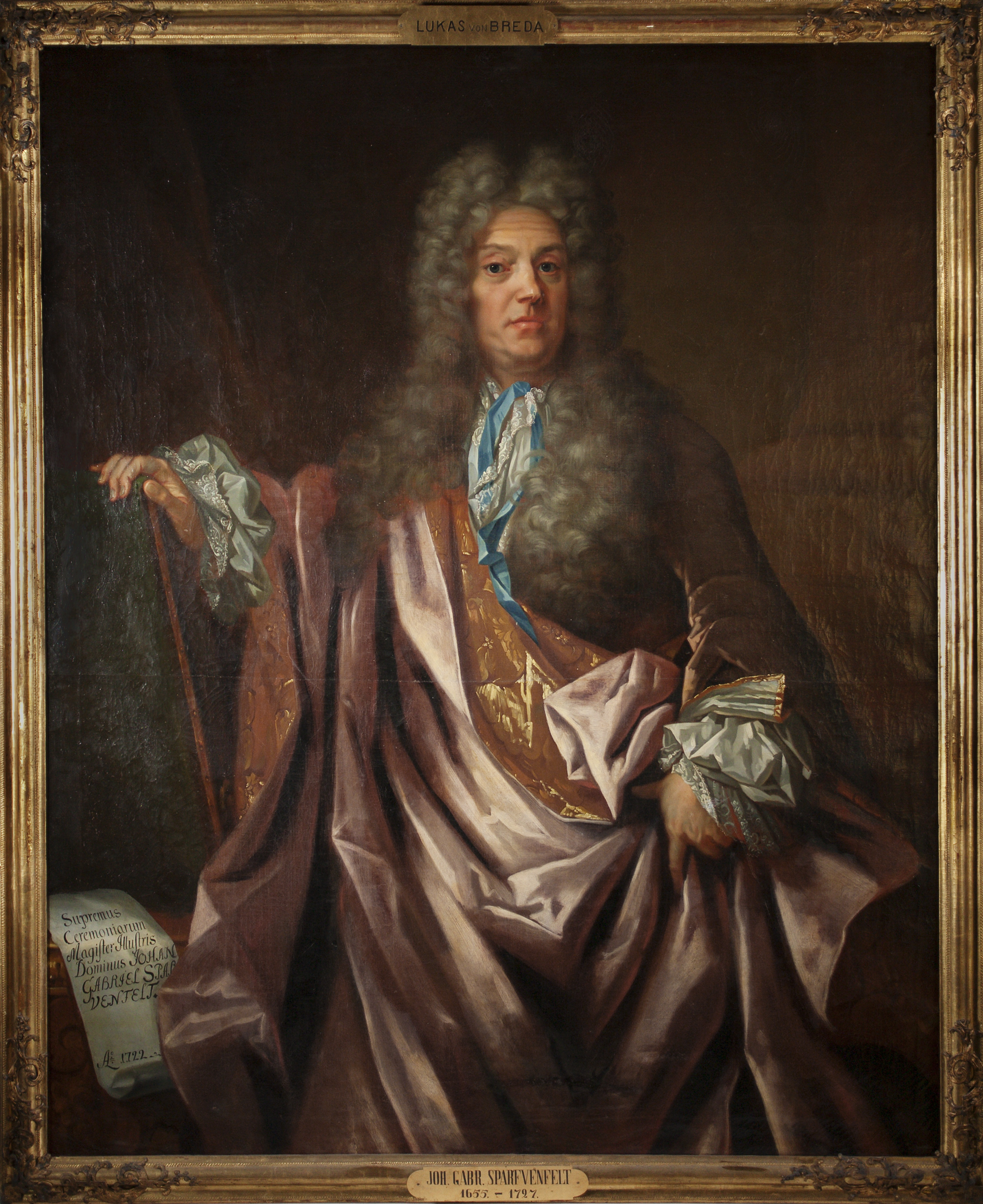
Johan Gabriel Sparwenfeld, portrait by Lucas von Breda.

Events from the year 1727 in Sweden

== Incumbents ==
- Monarch – Frederick I

== Events ==
- July - The Mauritz Vellingk affair: he is sentenced to death for contact with Russia, but the sentence is commuted.
- - The Holstein Party is dissolved.
- Lithographiæ Svecanæ Specimen Secundum by Magnus Bromelius is published.

== Births ==
- Ingeborg Norell, heroine

== Deaths ==
- 24 January - Magdalena Stenbock, politically active countess and salonnière (born 1649)
- 2 June - Johan Gabriel Sparwenfeld, linguist, diarist (born 1655)
