= Katarina Erlandsdotter =

Swedish artist (171–1848)

Katarina Erlandsdotter (1771–1848) was a Swedish artist (tapestry maker).

Daughter of the gardener Erland Hallberg and Anna Maria Kristoffersdotter and the sister of Sven Erlandsson (1768–1853) and Lisa Erlandsdotter (1771–1848); the three siblings all became known as artists, and are counted among the most prominent within their craft in 18th-century Sweden. Katarina made bonadsmålning, a Swedish art form, which is a type of painted tapestry of textile used for decoration, largely among the peasantry.

Katarina lived her entire life in the countryside at Mårdaklev in Älvsborgs län.
