= Maria Romberg =

Swedish woman executed for murder in 1725

Maria Romberg (1697 – 14 April 1725) was a Swedish convicted murderer, the central person in a murder story well known in her time. She was convicted along with her three accomplices, among them her lover, for the death of her husband.

== Background ==
In 1716, at the age of 19, Maria Romberg was arranged to marry merchant Anders Broberg, 27 years her senior, in Borås, against her will. Broberg was said to abuse Maria; he was called brutal and Maria's stepfather accused him of alcoholism. In 1719, Maria started a relationship with her childhood friend, Haqvin Wijndruf, a member of one of the most wealthy and influential families in Borås. The relationship was well known in the city, and many people acted as messengers for their letters.

In 1722, her husband called upon two vicars to lecture her. After this, Maria and Haqvin made two attempts to poison Broberg, but failed. Maria then hired a cunning woman called Romans Ingeborg, who was reputed to be able to perform magic, and who assured her that she had performed many murders for hire in the past. The three accomplices then made up plans. On one occasion, they tried to strangle him, but failed. In 1724, they informed the maid Karin Andersdotter of their plans: Broberg had abused her, and she wanted revenge.

== Murder ==
On 28 December 1724, Maria was again lectured by the vicars, and the same night, Maria, Haqvin, Ingeborg and Karin planned the murder. The three women went to Broberg's bedroom, where he was asleep, and Ingeborg hit him in the head until he died. They then placed his body to look as if he had tripped and hit his head.

When the corpse was examined, he was thought to have been murdered, and so Maria and her three accomplices were accused of murder. Karin was the first to confess. When Maria heard this, she also confessed, and told Haqvin to do the same. Haqvin denied everything, claimed that she had several lovers beside him, and tried to escape, but was arrested and forced to confess.

== Execution ==
On 23 February, Maria, Haqvin, Ingeborg, and Karin were found guilty and sentenced to death. They were all decapitated, with some variations. Maria was decapitated and burned, Haqvin was decapitated and had his head nailed to a pole, Ingeborg had her hand cut off, and was then decapitated and burned. Karin was simply decapitated, and buried. The sentence was carried out on 14 April 1725.

The affair ended the influence of the Wijndruf family in the city. Haqvin's brother Andreas was ordained a priest just four days later and emigrated to North America in the summer of 1725.
