= Anna Göransdotter =

Swedish artist (1797–1867)

Anna Göransdotter (1797–1867) was a Swedish textile artist.

She lived in the Föllinge parish in Jämtland. She belonged to the peasantry, appears not to have been married, and lived on various farms in the parish, often with her brother. The documentation of the parish vicar, who regularly interrogated the parishioners in their religious knowledge, noted that she was sickly but also "intelligent with good sense and well capable of reading and writing".

She was officially registered as a seamstress. She is known for her embroidery illustrations on textile, which often depicted naturalistic wedding stories with blue thread on white textile or (more seldom) with red and yellow thread. Stories of this kind were uncommon among the peasant art of the 19th century in Sweden. The majority of her work is from the 1840s, but there are examples from before and after that as well. Uncommonly for a woman artist from the peasantry, she signed her own work.

While there had always been professionally women textile artists in the Swedish peasantry, they are seldom identified, because most of them did not sign their work and are remembered only through oral tradition which was written down in the 19th century, such as Elna Jonsdotter of Blekinge, "Mrs Ådal" of Asarum, Brita Carlsdotter Rudolphi (1813–1887), Brita-Kajsa Karlsdotter (1816–1915) and Anna Göransdotter.
