= Jean Grossaint De la Roche-yon =

Swedish officer and spy (1713–1769)

Jean Grossaint De la Roche-yon (1713 - 1769) was a Swedish officer and spy.

Han was born in Lysekil. He was a lieutenant in the regiment of Maurice de Saxe in 1735, served in the Swedish army in Finland in 1736–43, and in the Danish army as colonel lieutenant in 1743–59.

He was active in Sweden as a Danish agent in 1740–44, supporting the Pro-Danish party against the Hats (party)-government and influencing members of the Peasant- and Priest-Estates in favor of Danish interests. During the Dalecarlian rebellion (1743), he acted as a channel between the rebels and the Danish embassy. He was suspected of having encouraged the rebellion, and when it was defeated he escaped to Denmark. He returned in secret in the mission of recruiting Dalecarlian rebels to support a planned Danish invasion of Sweden from Norway, but failed and returned to Denmark.

Sweden demanded that he be extradited from Denmark, but Denmark refused by sending him abroad to live incognito and tell Sweden that he died. He lived the rest of his life comfortable on the salary from a titular office in the Danish military.

His career has been described as typical of the many adventurers participating in the political life during the Swedish Age of Liberty.
