= Cornelius Anckarstjerna =

Cornelius Didrikson Thijsen Anckarstierna (25 January 1655 – 19 April 1714) was a Swedish admiral of Dutch origin and a member of the Swedish House of Nobility.

== Early life ==
Cornelius Anckarstierna was born on 25 January 1655 in Stockholm. His father, Didrik Corneliusson Thijsen, was of Dutch origin and was a naval officer in the Swedish navy. Anckarstierna spent his childhood accompanying his father on his journeys. After joining the navy, he quickly rose through the ranks. In 1669, he became a lieutenant, and in 1676 a captain.

== Combat with the Danes and ennoblement ==
In the naval battle near Møn on 1 June 1677, he commanded the ship Kalmar castle with 74 cannons. When Anckarstierna was about to be defeated by the Danish admiral Bielke, he targeted two shots through the ballast of his own ship so that it sank.

In 1678, Anckarstierna became a major and was ennobled. He was appointed to schoutbynacht in 1680, and vice admiral in 1683. The Swedish king Charles XI appointed Anckarstierna in 1692 to admiral of Ousbyholm in Hörby parish, Skåne.

== Later years ==
Anckarstierna was in command of the Swedish fleet's second squadron during the landing on Zealand in 1700. He served as commander-in-chief the same year when Charles XII was transferred to Livonia and in 1705 during the failed landing on the island Retusari in the Gulf of Finland.

He died in Knutstorp in 1714. Anckarstierna was married twice: first with Elisabeth Kröger, whom he had two sons and one daughter with, and then with Ms. Sparre, whom he had two daughters and one son with.

== See also ==
- Mårten Anckarhielm né Maerten Thijssen (died 1657), Dutch admiral who became a Swedish admiral and nobleman
