= Hedvig Eleonora Stenbock =

Swedish noblewoman (1658–1714)

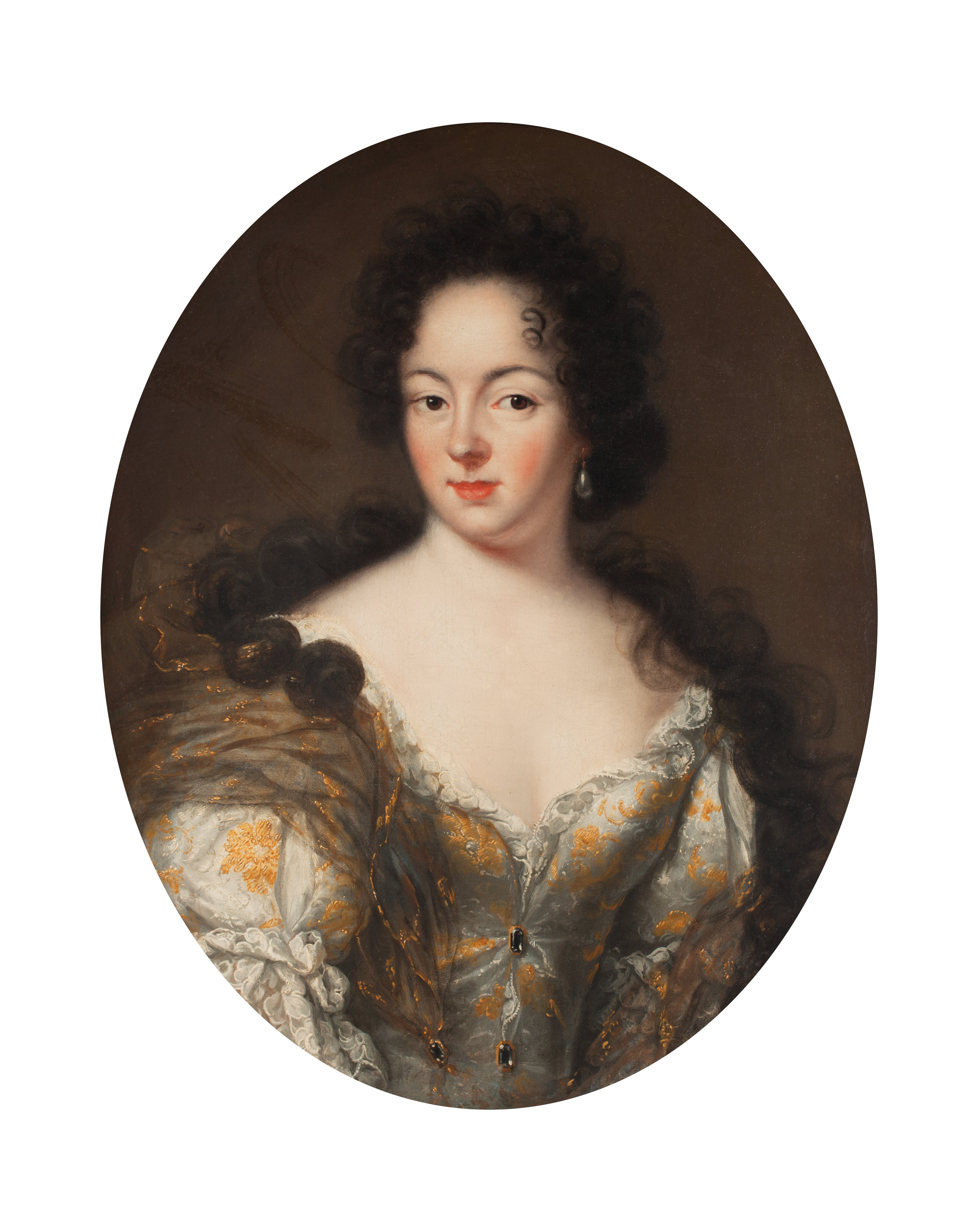
- Portrait by David Klöcker Ehrenstrahl
- Born: 1658
- Died: 1714 (aged 55–56)

Hedvig Eleonora Stenbock (1658–1714) was a Swedish noblewoman and lady-in-waiting; daughter of Count Erik Stenbock and related to queen Katarina Stenbock; sister of the political salonist Magdalena Stenbock.

== Life ==
She was described as beautiful and well educated and could speak French, German and Italian. She was the kammarfröken of the queen dowager, Hedwig Eleonora of Holstein-Gottorp.

Stenbock caused a great conflict of rank at the royal court when she demanded precedence in etiquette before another lady-in-waiting, Johan Göransson Gyllenstierna's sister Ingeborg Gyllenstierna, despite Gyllenstierna being senior as a lady-in-waiting: "on the grounds that she was the daughter of a Count and a lord of the state, while Ingeborg was the mere daughter of a Baron, admiral and governor”. The queen dowager judged the matter in favour of Stenbock, which meant that Stenbock had in fact changed the etiquette of precedence at court. It was considered that the conflicts among the nobles at the royal court had political consequences: ” and thus this battle of etiquette were among the motivation as to why the great reduction were so swiftly and strictly conducted” by Johan Gyllenstierna, who became the enemy of Stenbock and her family.

Stenbock was known for her rank conflicts at court, and caused many more similar quarrels. In 1681, Margareta von Parr was appointed first lady-in-waiting to one of the royal children. This insulted Stenbock, as Parr's spouse, though a royal lord of the state, had been ennobled as late as in 1673 on his own merits, and lived in humble economic circumstances: his sister rented out rooms in the capital. To display her displeasure, Stenbock stepped on the train of Parr in the middle of the baptismal procession of the royal child. When Parr complained to the Queen Dowager, she refused to take sides, and when she confronted Stenbock herself, she replied: "It is bad enough that the filth has been placed among apples!" These numerous conflicts at court in the late 17th century are considered to reflect the conflict between the old nobility and a new phenomenon: the rising career nobility, commoners being ennobled for their merits.

Stenbock, however, in fact caused a new conflict about rank herself, in the opposite direction, when she married Nicodemus Tessin the Younger on 15 June 1689. The marriage was considered a scandal at court because Tessin was seen as a lesser noble than she, and it was made after an elopement to Swedish Pomerania, against the will of her family and the queen dowager.

== Sources ==
- Anteckningar om svenska qvinnor
- Norrhem, Svante (in Swedish): Kvinnor vid maktens sida : 1632-1772 (In English: "Women by the side of power: 1632-1772") (2007) Lund (Nordic Academic Press)
