= Sophie von Knorring =

Swedish novelist and noble (1797–1848)

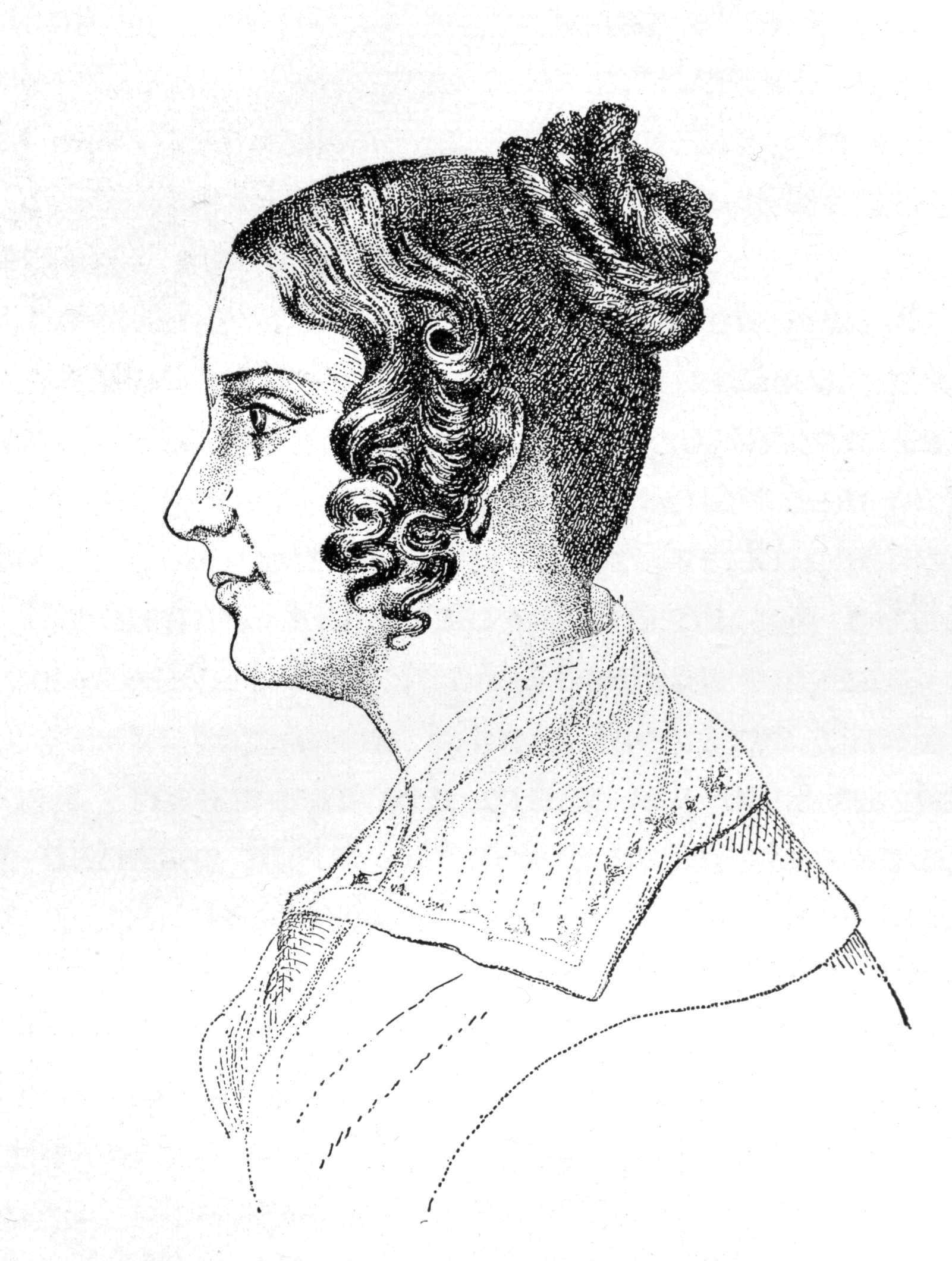
Sophie von Knorring.

Sophie Margareta von Knorring (née Zelow; 28 September 1797 – 13 February 1848) was a Swedish novelist and noble. She is regarded as a pioneer of the realistic novel in Sweden. Most of her novels are romantic love stories in an aristocratic environment.

== Biography ==
She was born the offspring of the noble major Christer Göran Zelow, chamberlain at the royal court, and Helena Sophia Gripenstedt, at the manor Gräfsnäs on 28 September 1797. She and her four younger sisters was given an education regarded suitable for a female noble before marriage and debuting in aristocratic high society life: German, English, French, Italian, Music, painting and dance, all provided for by private teachers at home. They were taught religion, history and literature by the poet Arvid August Afzelius.

She lived in the capital of Stockholm with her mother and sisters from 1810, where she debuted in society in the 1812–13 season. This was a particularly lively society season in Stockholm, which is estimated to have affected her and her work: she was introduced to Madame de Staël, for whom she felt deep admiration. She also watched Racine and Corneille performed by the French theatre company, including the famous Marguerite Georges, which had been expelled from Russia, and tableau vivants and pantomimes performed by Henriette Hendel-Schütz, which made a great success in Stockholm.

In 1814, her father was ruined, and the family lived under limited circumstances. In 1820, she married colonel Baron Sebastian von Knorring. Her marriage did not change her economic situation much, as though her spouse was a noble, he supported himself merely at his salary. She followed her spouse on his commendations: from 1834, they lived permanently in Axevalla. From 1827, she suffered from consumption, and though she "long mastered it successfully", she was forced to spend her winters inside, and eventually died from it. She was able to travel abroad a couple of times; she visited Copenhagen in 1838 and Germany and Austria in 1846.

== Work ==
Sophie von Knorring debuted in 1834. As her first novels depicted several private people, such as her own former love objects, she initially wished to remain anonymous.

Her debut Cousinerna (The cousins) treats the subject of love opposite duty. A reoccurring theme in all her work was the tragedy in having to give up forbidden love, though this was also something necessary to do in the end. Her love stories normally portrayed the passionate love affair between a demonic male character and a virtuous female, who tragically but heroically defeated her forbidden desire with sense, religion and duty, even when acknowledging that there is nothing more painful in life than forsaking love. In her novel Förhoppningar (Hopes), the hero of the story was the sixteen-year-old stepson and his former stepmother, the widow Ottilia, which was a controversial combination in the 19th century. According to the critic Böök: "She caresses desires in parallel with praising duty", which was reoccurring theme in her work. von Knorring herself stated that her true element was "the deepest secrets of the human of every day life". In her novel Torparen (The Farmer), her first novel not set in an aristocratic environment, she defended the right of "people of the lower order" to have their stories told without prejudice, as "they think, feel, act, rejoice and suffer the same as we do - though under different circumstances". During the 1830s and -40s, her books were translated to German, French, English and Danish.

Sophie von Knorring was inspired by Fredrika Bremer, though their opinion regarding feminism differed. Bremer has described von Knorring as a frivolous, witty and vivacious aristocrat with a consuming passion, who only succumbed to religion on her death bed. Her foremost professional rival, Emilie Flygare-Carlén, accused her in her novel Kamrer Lassman for being a seductress of youth and for having fault morals. She engaged publicly in an analysis of the psychology of adultery, which made her a target of Almqvist and von Braun. With her friend Malla Silfverstolpe, she participated in the public debate regarding common law marriage: in her novels, she wrote passionately of the strength of forbidden love, but they always ended in her characters tragically forsaking love for duty, and she objected to Almqvist radical idea that people should be able to live together for love without being married. Upon this, Almqvist replied in his article: "Why people argue against what they deep inside desire with the most heavenly corner of their soul".

She died of consumption 13 February 1848.

== Legacy ==
Alongside Carl Jonas Love Almqvist, August Blanche, Fredrika Bremer and Emilie Flygare-Carlén, Sophie von Knorring dominated the Swedish realistic literature in the 1830s and 1840s.

== Works ==
- Cousinerna (1834) (The Cousins)
- Illusionerna (1836) (The Illusions)
- Skizzer. Första samlingen (1841) (Sketches. First Collection)
- Förhoppningar (1843) (Expectations)
- Torparen och hans omgifning (1843) (The Crofter and his Environment)
- Skizzer. Andra samlingen (1845) (Sketches. Second collection)
- Bref till hemmet, under en sommarresa 1846 (1847) (Letters home, during a summer journey in 1846)

== Sources ==
- Sophie M Knorring, von, urn:sbl:11659, Svenskt biografiskt lexikon (art av Carl-Edvard Nattsén), hämtad 2014-11-15.
