= Brita Ryy =

Swedish educator

Brita Ryy (1725–1783) was a Swedish educator and member of the Moravian Church.

Brita Ryy was the daughter of a vicar and married the wealthy Snus-factory owner Petter Swartz (1726–1789) in Norrköping, with whom she had eight children. She was described as well educated and as the partner of her spouse in his interest for philanthropy, particularly Christian education influenced by the Moravian Church.

In 1772, the couple founded the Swartska friskolan ('Swarts' Free School') The school was open for both poor girls and boys, did not use the physical punishments normally used in schools, and used a pedagogical method inspired by the Moravian Church, and had a methodical and psychological foundation considered radically progressive and before its time. The school attracted attention for its radical views and became a role model for the Swedish primary school system introduced in 1842. Although the school was founded by the couple jointly, it was managed by Brita Ryy and the methods used were created by her. She also left two manuscripts of Christian education. The school closed in 1940.
