= Helena Escholin =

Historical figure in Finland (1713–1783)

Helena Escholin (1713-1783) was a Finnish clergyman's wife and made wafers for the Turku Cathedral. Her records have been researched and are considered valuable in Finnish historical research.
