= Svenljunga Municipality =

Svenljunga Municipality Svenljunga kommun
- Municipality
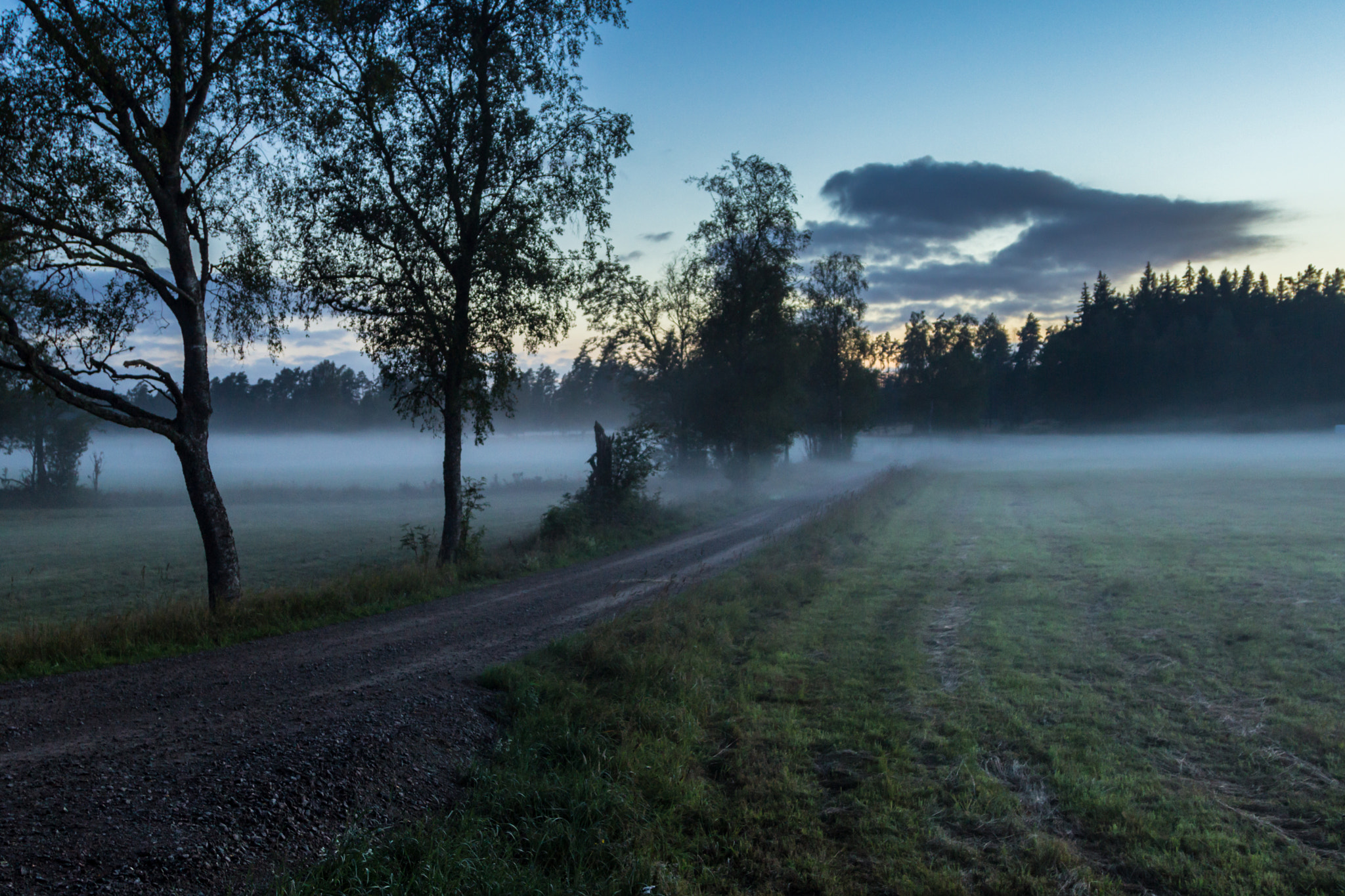

- Coat of arms

- Coordinates: 57°30′N 13°07′E
- Country: Sweden
- County: Västra Götaland County
- Seat: Svenljunga

Area
  - Total: 987.15 km^{2} (381.14 sq mi)
  - Land: 919.76 km^{2} (355.12 sq mi)
  - Water: 67.39 km^{2} (26.02 sq mi)
- Area as of 1 January 2014.

Population (30 June 2025)
  - Total: 10,675
  - Density: 11.606/km^{2} (30.060/sq mi)
- Time zone: UTC+1 (CET)
  - Summer (DST): UTC+2 (CEST)
- ISO 3166 code: SE
- Province: Västergötland
- Municipal code: 1465
- Website: www.svenljunga.se

Svenljunga Municipality (Swedish: Svenljunga kommun) is a municipality in Västra Götaland County in western Sweden. Its seat is located in the town of Svenljunga.

The present municipality was created in 1971 when five municipal units (or parts thereof) were amalgamated. The number of original entities (as of 1863) is 14.

Through the municipality the river Ätran flows in a scenic valley. It flows through the town of Svenljunga, where an old bridge crosses it.

This was the hometown of the great-great-great grandfather of Emma Stone, American actress. In the 18th-century, the village of Mårdaklev in Svenljunga Municipality was the home of a trio of sibling textile artists: Sven Erlandsson, Katarina Erlandsdotter and Lisa Erlandsdotter.

== Demographics ==
This is a demographic table based on Svenljunga Municipality's electoral districts in the 2022 Swedish general election sourced from SVT's election platform, in turn taken from SCB official statistics.

In total there were 10,857 residents, including 8,140 Swedish citizens of voting age. 38.6% voted for the left coalition and 60.3% for the right coalition. Indicators are in percentage points except population totals and income.

Location	Residents	Citizen adults	Left vote	Right vote	Employed	Swedish parents	Foreign heritage	Income SEK	Degree
Location			%	%					
Hillared	1,300	985	39.8	59.2	86	85	15	27,132	31
Högvad	1,623	1,231	36.6	62.3	81	82	18	22,772	23
Kindaholm	1,498	1,152	40.8	57.6	80	85	15	22,245	26
Sexdrega	1,265	989	39.2	59.7	85	87	13	25,519	23
Svenljunga S	1,588	1,160	38.6	60.5	75	75	25	22,596	23
Svenljunga V	1,788	1,249	37.4	62.1	77	69	31	23,234	24
Svenljunga Ö	1,795	1,374	36.6	62.3	83	82	18	24,735	25
Source: SVT
