= Marketta Punasuomalainen =

Alleged Finnish witch

Marketta Ristontytär Punasuomalainen (1600–1658), was a Finnish cunning woman and an alleged witch. She was one of the first people executed for sorcery in Finland (which then was a part of Sweden) and also perhaps one of the best known victims of the witch hunt in present-day Finland.

== Biography ==
Marketta and her husband, Simo Antinpoika, owned a farm in Ruovesi. During the 1630s, they were forced to leave their farm in the 1630s, and made a living as travelling beggars in the country around the city of Vasa (Fi. Vaasa). They often stayed around the Vasa region and supported themselves with various temporary jobs. Marketta also worked as a cunning woman.

The couple was surrounded by rumors of witchcraft. There was a history of witchcraft in her family, as the uncle of her husband had been accused of sorcery in 1624. Marketta worked in herbal medicine, and had the reputation of being a magician, something she encouraged and attempted to use for her benefit.

The farmers began to fear her. In 1655, a complaint was filed against her by the peasants to the bishop, describing their fear of her sorcery. Church of Sweden Lutheran minister Jacob Vasenius called on the public to arrest her. Witnesses heard Marketta make threats against him, and he died shortly after. A man made threats against her while she was begging, and afterwards his baby became ill. Several people became sick or died after a conflict with her, which was believed to be due to her enchanting them.

She was arrested and brought to trial in Vasa in 1657. When she was put on trial, she was accused of making babies sick, enchanting beer, creating sickness, and killing two men with magic. She responded that she had never harmed anyone, but the public opinion demanded a conviction, and she was judged guilty and sentenced to be decapitated and burnt at the stake.

Both her husband and her daughter, Katarina, were also accused of sorcery, but acquitted from the charges.
