= Anna Maria Hilfeling =

Swedish artist (1713–1783)

Anna Maria Hilfening
- Born: Anna Maria Lange; 21 April 1713; Stockholm, Sweden
- Died: 26 May 1783 (aged 70); Bohuslän, Sweden
- Known for: Painting
- Movement: Rococo

Anna Maria Hilfeling, née Lange (21 April 1713 – 26 May 1783) was a Swedish artist and portrait miniaturist.

== Biography ==
Hilfeling was born in Stockholm, the daughter of a book-keeper. She displayed talent in drawing as a child, became a student of artist Burchardt Precht in 1722, at the age of nine, and was later a student of the artist Niclas Lafrenssen (1698-1756). She was admired by Carl Gustav Tessin, and by the royal house. She painted in oil and made drawings, but was foremost a miniaturist. Among her clients were the king and the queen, king Frederick I of Sweden and queen Ulrika Eleonora of Sweden.

Hilfeling married the city surgeon Johan Gottfried Hilfeling in 1739. Their son, Carl Gustav Gottfried Hilfeling (1740-1823) also became an artist. Anna Maria Hilfeling died at Romelanda in Bohuslän.

== Other sources ==
- Anteckningar om svenska qvinnor
- "Svenskt Konstnärslexikon", Allhems Förlag, Malmö.
