= 1601 in Sweden =

- Decades: 1580s; 1590s; 1600s; 1610s; 1620s
- See also: Other events of 1601; Timeline of Swedish history

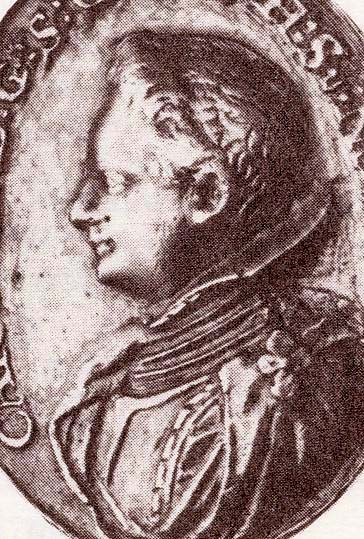
Carl Philip

Events from the year 1601 in Sweden

== Events ==
- 23 June - Battle of Kokenhausen, in which Polish forces defeated the Swedish relief force and captured the besieging force, relieving the Polish garrison. The battle is known as one of the greatest victories of the Polish hussars, who defeated their numerically superior Swedish adversaries.
- Throughout the year, Sweden was involved in war against the nation of Poland.

== Births ==
- Date unknown - Ingierd Gunnarsdotter, folk ballad singer (died 1686)
- 22 April- Charles Philip, Duke of Södermanland, prince (died 1622)
