= 1669 in Sweden =

- Years in Sweden: 1666 1667 1668 1669 1670 1671 1672
- Centuries: 16th century · 17th century · 18th century
- Decades: 1630s 1640s 1650s 1660s 1670s 1680s 1690s
- Years: 1666 1667 1668 1669 1670 1671 1672

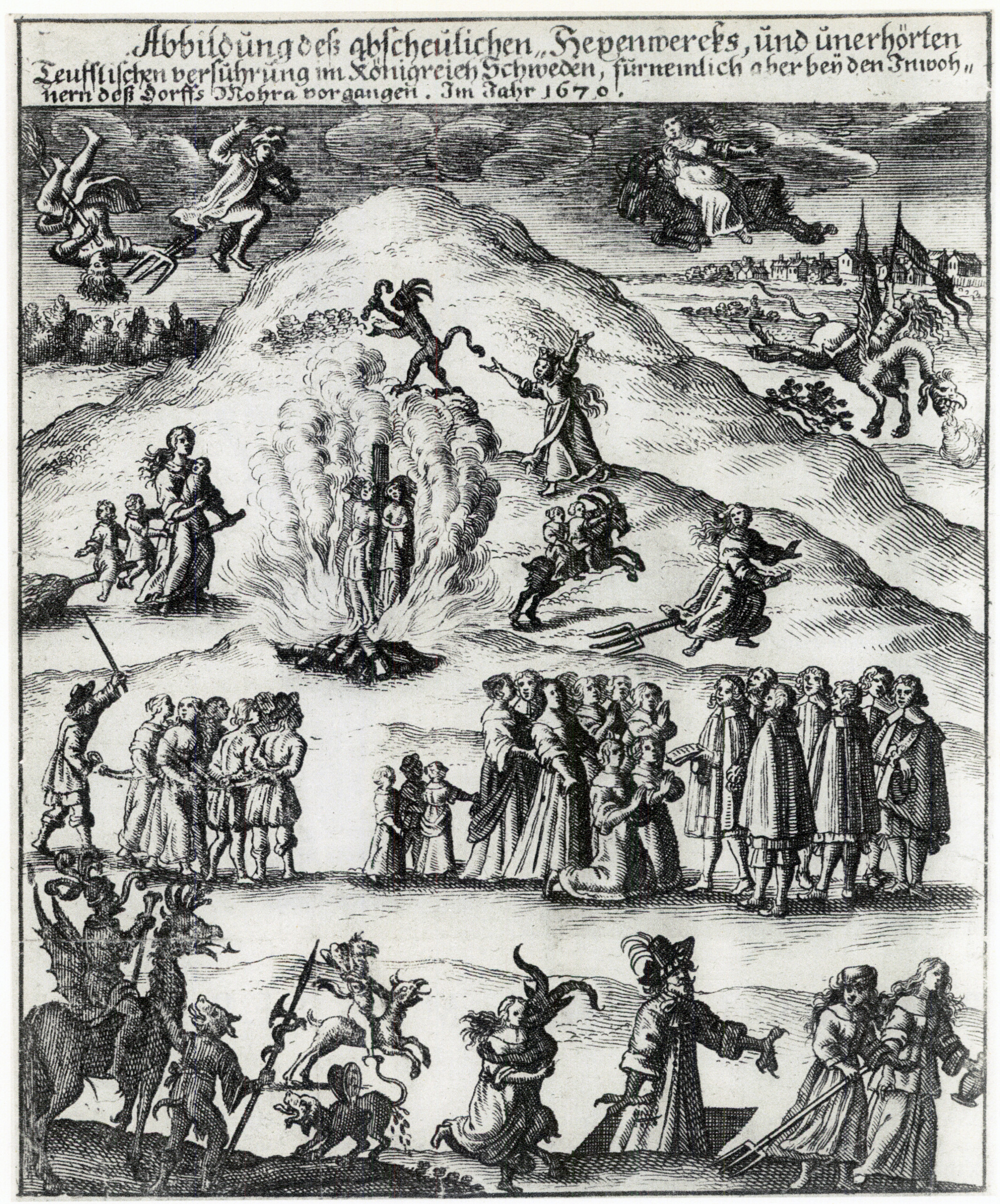
The famous German illustration of the Mora witch trial, 1670. In the illustration, however, the condemned are executed by burning at the stake, which was a common execution method in witch trials in Germany, but did in fact not occur at the Mora witch trial.

Events from the year 1669 in Sweden

== Incumbents ==
- Monarch – Charles XI

== Events ==
- Gothenburg burns down.
- Margareta Beijer becomes the second female manager of the Swedish Post Office.
- The trial against the conversion of Christina Eleonora Drakenhielm.
- The Mora witch trial is conducted.

== Births ==
- 24 May - Emerentia von Düben, royal favorite (died 1743)
- Gustaf von Psilander, admiral (died 1738)

== Deaths ==
- April 23 - Johannes Canuti Lenaeus, archbishop (born 1573)
- 15 May - Margareta Brahe, controversial countess and courtier (born 1603)
- unknown date - Margareta Slots, royal mistress (born unknown)
- 22 October - Sigrid Banér, Swedish letter writer (born 1592)
