= 1598 in Sweden =

- Years in Sweden: 1595 1596 1597 1598 1599 1600 1601
- Centuries: 15th century · 16th century · 17th century
- Decades: 1560s 1570s 1580s 1590s 1600s 1610s 1620s
- Years: 1595 1596 1597 1598 1599 1600 1601

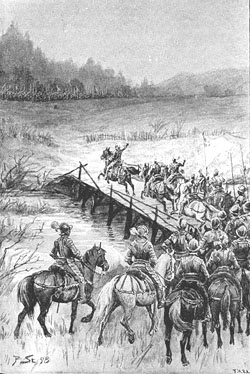
The Battle of Stångebro

Events from the year 1598 in Sweden.

== Incumbents ==
- Monarch – Sigismund

== Events ==
- 16 January - The Rurik Dynasty collapses when Feodor I of Russia dies.
- May - Sigismund III return to Avaskär, Sweden, and his uncle and regent Duke Charles resist him resulting in the War against Sigismund.
- 18 September - The Battle of Stegeborg results in victory for the Polish-Swedish unionists.
- 25 September - The Battle of Stångebro results in victory for the Swedish rebels under Duke Charles and the end of the union.

== Births ==
- - Georg Stiernhielm, linguist
- - Lars Stigzelius, archbishop
- - Sten Svantesson Bielke, soldier and politician
- - Åke Henriksson Tott, soldier and politician

== Deaths ==
- 10 February - Anne of Austria, Queen of Poland, queen consort (born 1578)
- 4 August - William Cecil, 1st Baron Burghley, English statesmen.
- 7 August - Georg Stiernhielm, linguist and mathematician (died 1672)
