= 1660 in Sweden =

- Decades: 1640s; 1650s; 1660s; 1670s; 1680s
- See also: Other events of 1660; Timeline of Swedish history

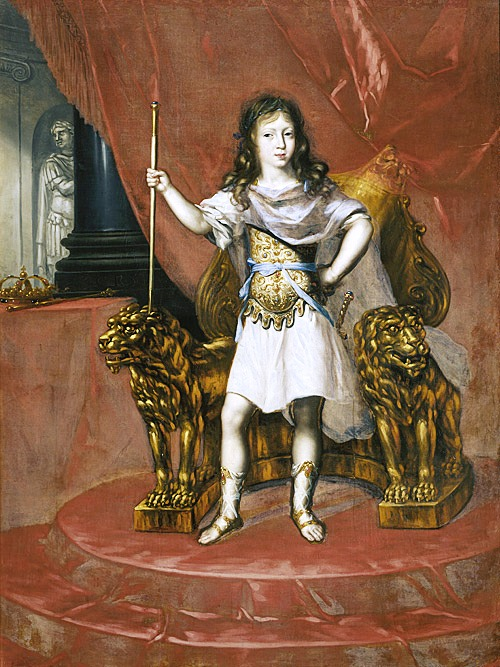
Charles XI, five years old

Events from the year 1660 in Sweden

== Incumbents ==
- Monarch - Charles X Gustav then Charles XI

== Events ==
- 13 February - Charles XI of Sweden succeeds Charles X Gustav of Sweden under a regency headed by his mother Queen Dowager Hedvig Eleonora.
- 27 May - The Treaty of Copenhagen (1660) is signed, marking the conclusion of the Second Northern War.
- Former Queen Christina visits Sweden and unsuccessfully claims the throne.
- 3 May: Treaty of Oliva: Formally ended the Second Northern War (1655–1660) with the Polish-Lithuanian Commonwealth, where3 John II Casimir Vasa renounced his claim to the Swedish throne.
- Military Status: Despite the wars, the Swedish army remained one of the strongest in Europe, and the empire maintained control over the Baltic Sea (Dominium Maris Baltici).

== Births ==
- 15 March – Olof Rudbeck the Younger, explorer, scientist (died 1740)
- Simon Affleck, tax official born in Estonia.
- Hedvig Eleonora Klingenstierna, first woman to hold a lecture at a Swedish university.

== Deaths ==
- 13 February - Charles X Gustav dies at the age of 37, while a Riksdag he had convened to address the military situation against Denmark was in session.
