= 1667 in Sweden =

- Years in Sweden: 1664 1665 1666 1667 1668 1669 1670
- Centuries: 16th century · 17th century · 18th century
- Decades: 1630s 1640s 1650s 1660s 1670s 1680s 1690s
- Years: 1664 1665 1666 1667 1668 1669 1670

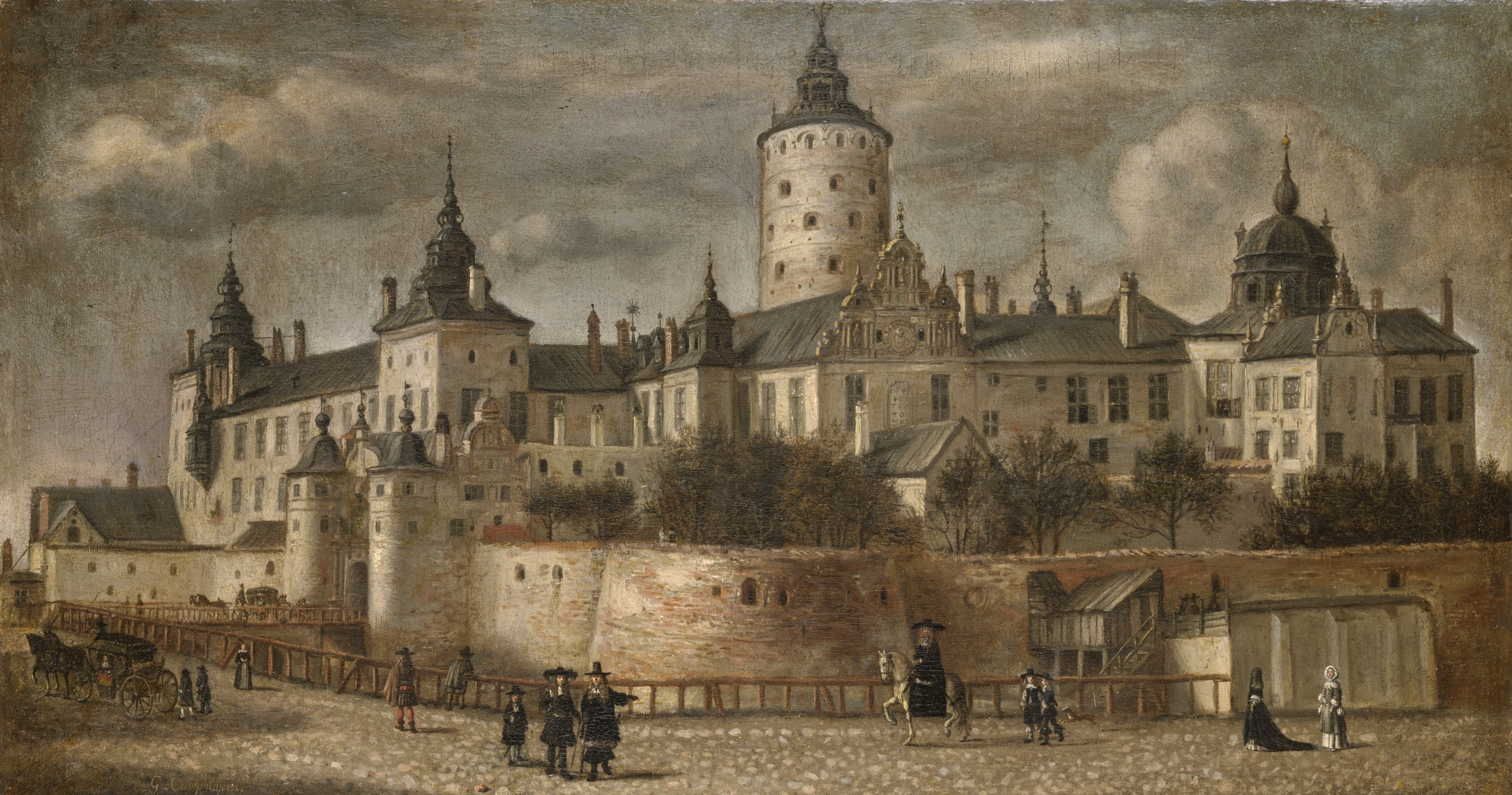
Painting of the Tre kronor castle by Govert Camphuysen from 1661. The building Lejonkulan can be seen on this picture to the right outside the wall. However, the building has been proven to be much large than what this painting illustrates.

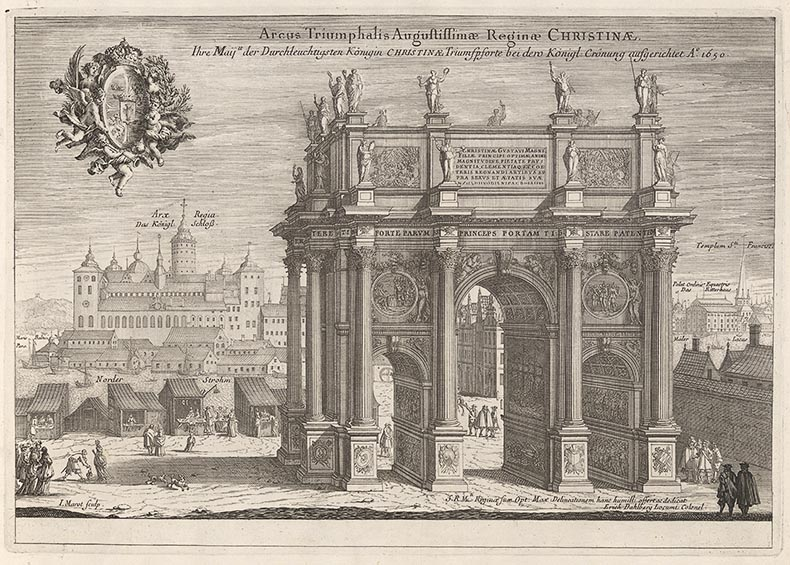
Suecia

Events from the year 1667 in Sweden

== Incumbents ==
- Monarch – Charles XI

== Events ==
- Inauguration of the theater in Lejonkulan in Stockholm, the first confirmed permanent theater in Sweden.
- Swedish Diplomats are involved in The Treaty of Breda.

== Births ==
- Brita Biörn, famous cunning woman (died unknown year)

== Deaths ==
- February 4 - Gustaf Bonde (1620–1667), statesman (born 1620)
- - George Fleetwood (Swedish general), general (born 1605)
- March 23 - Johan Papegoja, governor (born unknown)
