= 1590 in Sweden =

- Decades: 1570s; 1580s; 1590s; 1600s; 1610s
- See also: Other events of 1590; Timeline of Swedish history

Events from the year 1590 in Sweden

== Incumbents ==
- Monarch – John III

== Events ==
- A new succession order, the 1590 års arvförening, is issued.

== Births ==
- Johan Adler Salvius, a Swedish diplomat and baron
- Carl Jönsson Sabelskjöld, A Swedish nobleman who served in the military and was knighted in 1617 by Gustav II Adolf. He was born in Nyköping.

== Deaths ==
Per Brahe the Elder

- Per Brahe the Elder, statesman (born 1520)
- Clas Åkesson Tott, field marshal and privy Councillor (born 1530)
- Anna Hogenskild, court official (born 1513)
