= 1697 in Sweden =

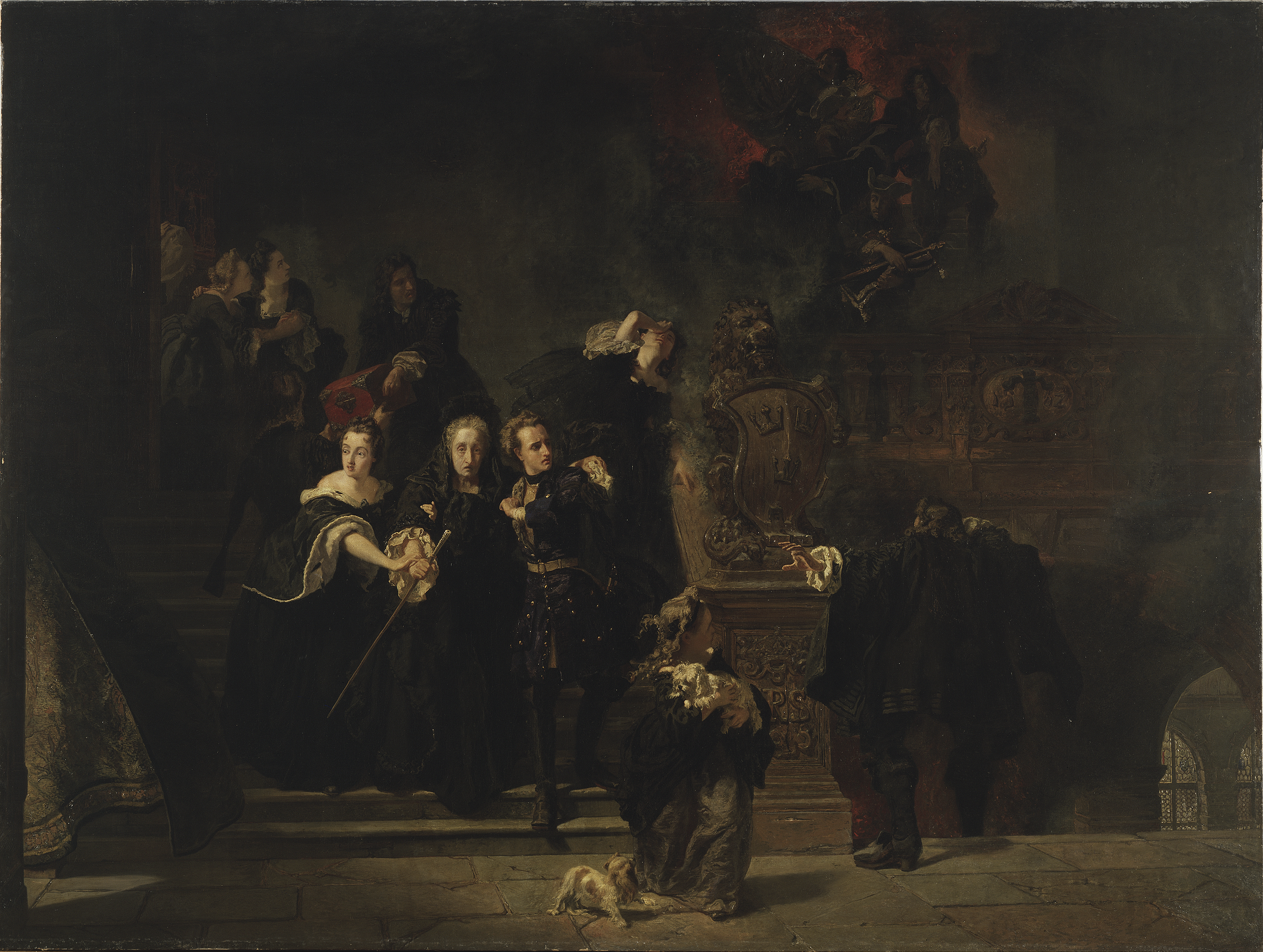
Johan Fredrik Höckert's painting from 1866 of the Castle Fire, showing young King Charles XII of Sweden with his grandmother and sisters escaping ahead of his recently deceased father's body, with his crown jewels coming down the stairs behind them.

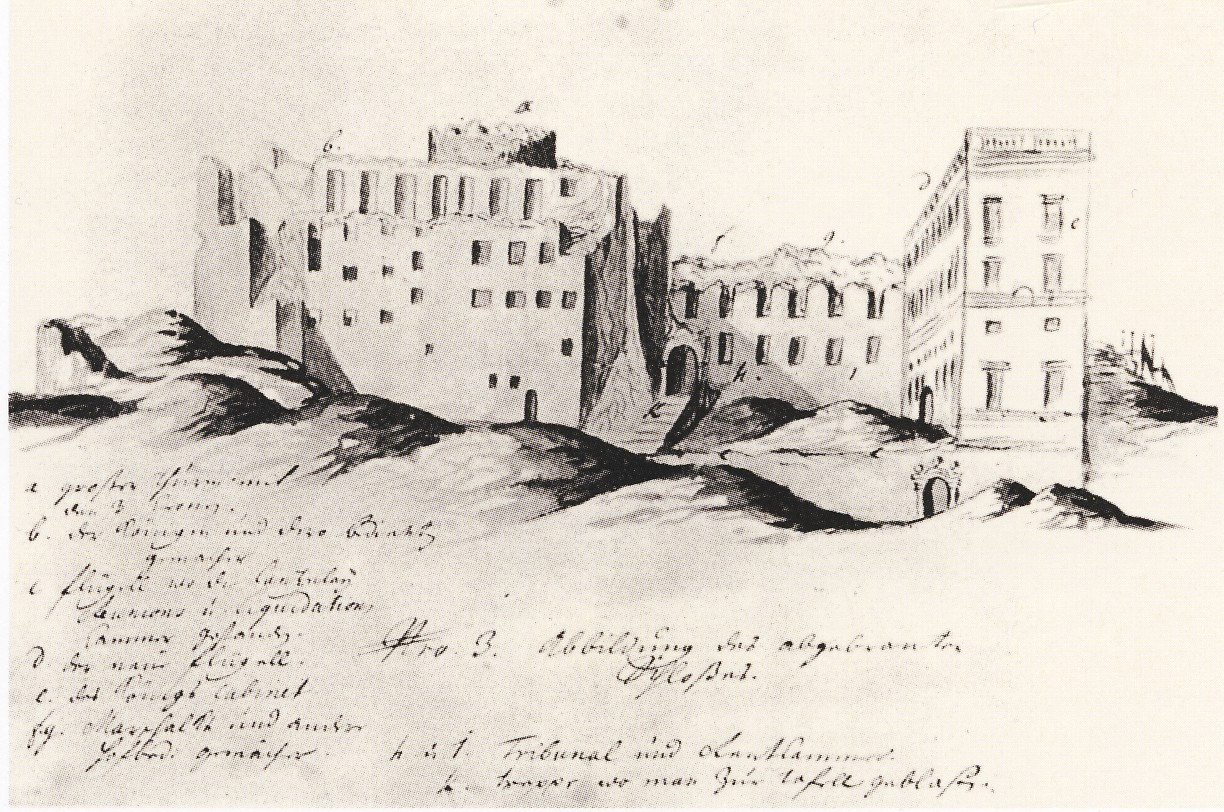
Castle after the fire.

Events from the year 1697 in Sweden.

== Incumbents ==
- Monarch – Charles XI, succeeded by Charles XII

== Events ==
- In the spring, the disastrous Great Famine comes to an end.
- 5 April - Charles XI of Sweden dies of stomach cancer, and is succeeded by Charles XII of Sweden under the regency of his grandmother, Hedwig Eleonora.
- 7 May - The royal residence in the capital, Tre Kronor (castle), burns down.
- Unknown Date - Christopher Polhem starts Sweden's first technical school.

== Births ==
- Helena Arnell, painter (died 1751)

== Deaths ==
- 5 April - Charles XI of Sweden, monarch (born 1655)
- 11 September - Agneta Rosenbröijer, noblewoman and businessperson (born 1620)
- - Karin Thomasdotter, vogt and länsman (born 1610)
- - Ebba Maria De la Gardie, singer and poet (born 1657)
