= 1610 in Sweden =

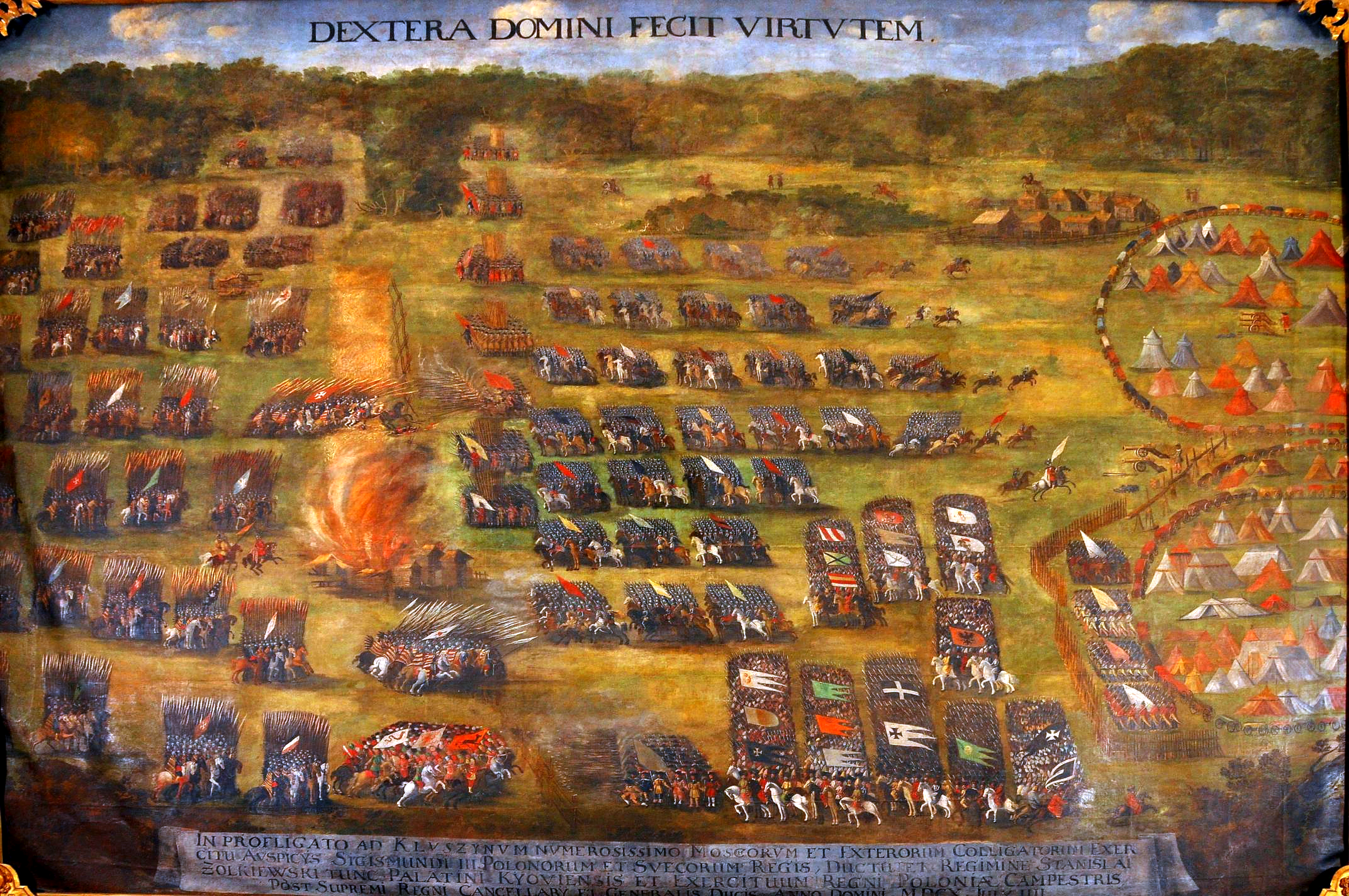
Battle of Klushino (1620), painting by Szymon Boguszowicz

Events from 1610 in Sweden

== Incumbents ==
- Monarch – Charles IX

== Events ==
- The Ingrian War between Sweden and the Tsardom of Russia begins, arising from the collapse of the Russo-Swedish alliance during the Time of Troubles; the conflict would last until 1617.
- The De la Gardie Campaign reaches its climax when a combined Russo-Swedish force under Jacob De la Gardie enters Moscow in March to break the rebel siege, temporarily strengthening Tsar Vasily IV's hold on the Russian throne.
- 4 July – At the Battle of Klushino, the Polish‑Lithuanian Commonwealth forces under Stanisław Żółkiewski decisively defeat the numerically superior combined Russian and Swedish army, leading to the deposition of Tsar Vasily IV and the withdrawal of Swedish-supported forces from central Russia.

== Births ==
- 30 July - Lorens von der Linde, (died 1670)
- - Karin Thomasdotter, vogt (died 1697)

== Deaths ==
- - Catherine Vasa, princess (died 1539)
