= 1686 in Sweden =

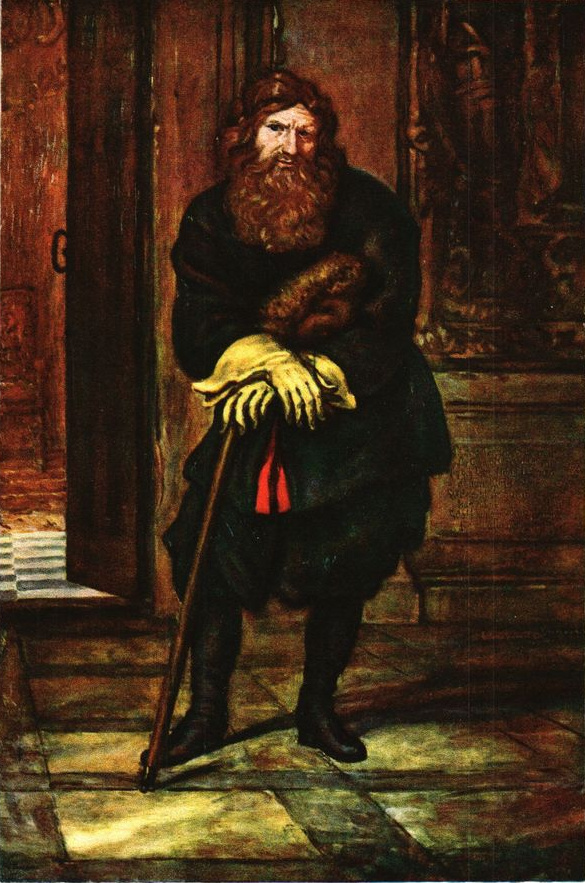
Bondeståndets talman Per Olsson 1686

Events from the year 1686 in Sweden

== Incumbents ==
- Monarch – Charles XI

== Events ==
- Establishment of the 1686 års kyrkolag (1686 Church Law), which confirms and describes the rights of the Lutheran Church and confirms Sweden as a Lutheran state: all non-Lutherans are banned from immigration unless the convert to Lutheranism; the Romani people are to be incorporated to the Lutheran Church; the poor care law is regulated; and all parishes is forced by law to learn the children within it to read and write in order to learn the scripture, which closely eradicates illiteracy in Sweden.
- A Commission is formed to create a new civil code, which eventually leads to the Civil Code of 1734.
- A new law regarding the rights of domestics is issued.
- A reform law allows unmarried women to testify and represent themselves in court despite being legally minors, as the law banning them from doing so is not respected by the courts.
- A church regulation explicitly confirms the common custom of Widow Conservation by stating that a parish vicar is to be chosen first by those candidates willing to marry the widow or daughter of his predecessor.
- The first Swedish language theater is inaugurated with the Dän Swänska Theatren in Lejonkulan.

== Deaths ==
- 26 April - Magnus Gabriel De la Gardie, politician and military (born 1622)
- 8 November - Anders Torstenson, member of the Privy Council, Governor-General of Estonia (born 1641)
- unknown - Ingierd Gunnarsdotter, folk ballad singer (died 1601)
