= 1594 in Sweden =

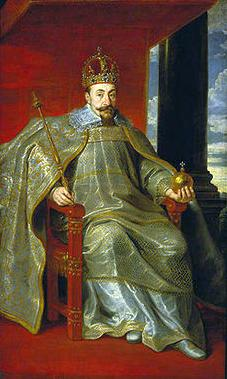
Sigismund III Vasa

Events from the year 1594 in Sweden.

== Incumbents ==
- Monarch – Sigismund III Vasa

== Events ==
- - John III is buried in Uppsala Cathedral.
- - Sigismund III Vasa is crowned.
- - Vadstena Abbey is given a new Catholic priest.
- - Sigismund leaves for his other Kingdom, Poland, and appoints his uncle Duke Charles regent in his absence.

== Births ==
- 1 September - Torsten Stålhandske, officer (died 1644)
- 9 December - Gustavus Adolphus of Sweden, monarch (died 1632)
- - Stormor i Dalom, vicar's wife and matriarch (died 1657)
