= 1620 in Sweden =

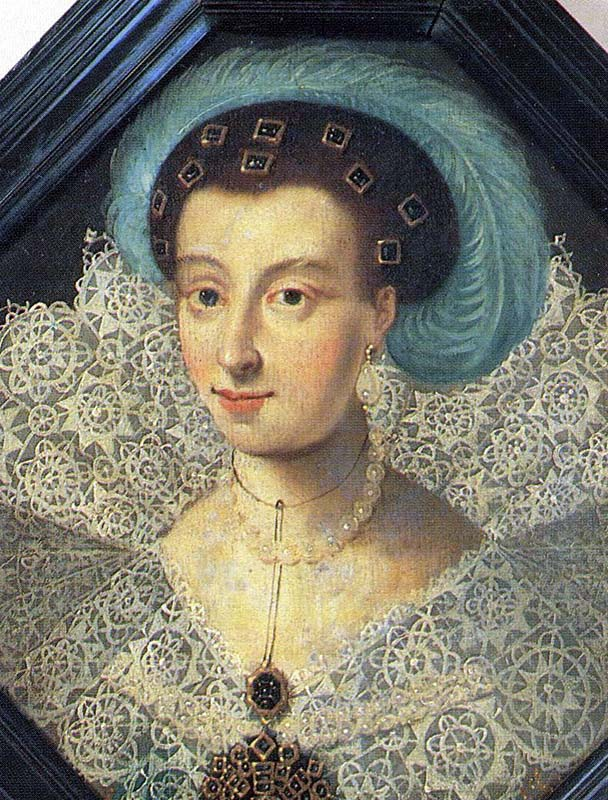
Mary Eleanor of Sweden c. 1630

Events from the year 1620 in Sweden

== Incumbents ==
- Monarch – Gustaf II Adolf

== Events ==
- 25 November - Wedding of Gustav II Adolf and Maria Eleonora

== Births ==
- 4 February - Gustaf Bonde (1620–1667), statesman (died 1667)
- date unknown - Agneta Rosenbröijer, noblewoman and businessperson (died 1697)

== Deaths ==
- Axel Ryning
