= 1740 in Sweden =

- Years in Sweden: 1737 1738 1739 1740 1741 1742 1743
- Centuries: 17th century · 18th century · 19th century
- Decades: 1710s 1720s 1730s 1740s 1750s 1760s 1770s
- Years: 1737 1738 1739 1740 1741 1742 1743

Events from the year 1740 in Sweden.

== Incumbents ==
- Monarch – Frederick I

== Events ==
- - Foundation of the retirement fund Allmänna Änke- och Pupillkassan i Sverige for the destitute widows of civil servants, undermining widow conservation.
- - The Christina Johansdotter case.
- - The Hats (party) campaign for a war against the Empire of Russia with French support.
- - An unsuccessful attempt is made to exile the King's mistress Hedvig Taube from the country.
- December – Sagan om hästen by Olof von Dalin

== Births ==
- 4 February – Carl Michael Bellman, poet, songwriter, composer and performer (died 1795)
- 7 September - Johan Tobias Sergel, neoclassical sculptor (died 1814)
- 8 December – Elisabeth Olin, opera singer and a music composer (died 1828)
- 16 December - Georg Magnus Sprengtporten, politician (died 1819)

== Deaths ==
- 30 January – Amalia Königsmarck, dilettante artist (painter), amateur actor, and poet (died 1663)
- 23 March - Olof Rudbeck the Younger, explorer, scientist (died 1660)
- – Christina Johansdotter, murderer
- date unknown – Margareta Gyllenstierna, politically active countess (died 1689)
