= Ukungenwa =

Traditional South African custom

In South Africa, ukungenwa is a traditional custom whereby a widowed woman automatically becomes her brother-in-law's wife, or is regarded as inherited by her brother-in-law. The practice occurs mainly in conservative rural parts of South Africa, in particular the Eastern Cape, and KwaZulu-Natal.

== History ==
In southern Africa, the ukungenwa custom is linked to the concept of marriage as the binding of two lineages. If a husband dies, his wives are expected to remain within the family group and are inherited by his male relatives (also known as Levirate marriage). Sometimes this involved no more than the mere assumption that a man must always exercise guardianship over a woman and provide economic needs a woman depends on a man for. Sometimes, however, the heir became a sexual partner and children borne from this relationship would be regarded as children of the dead husband. With the new relationship regarded as a continuation of the old marriage, no new marriage ceremony was conducted, but the heir had to pay any outstanding lobola (cattle payment).

Cultural practices such as ukuthwala (abducted marriages) and ukungenwa (widow inheritance) are expected to be outlawed in South Africa. Although the cultural practices are marginal and practised in some of the most conservative rural communities, the ANC policy conference has proposed a ban on such cultural practices as they are viewed as going against the human rights ethos of the South African constitution. In 2012, there was large public outcry in South Africa with the introduction of the Traditional Courts Bill, which affirmed recognition of the traditional justice system and its values—including practices such as ukungenwa and ukuthwala. In December of the same year a unanimous decision was made by the Parliament's Select Committee on Security and Constitution to withdraw the controversial bill.

== See also ==
- Widow inheritance
