= 1622 in Sweden =

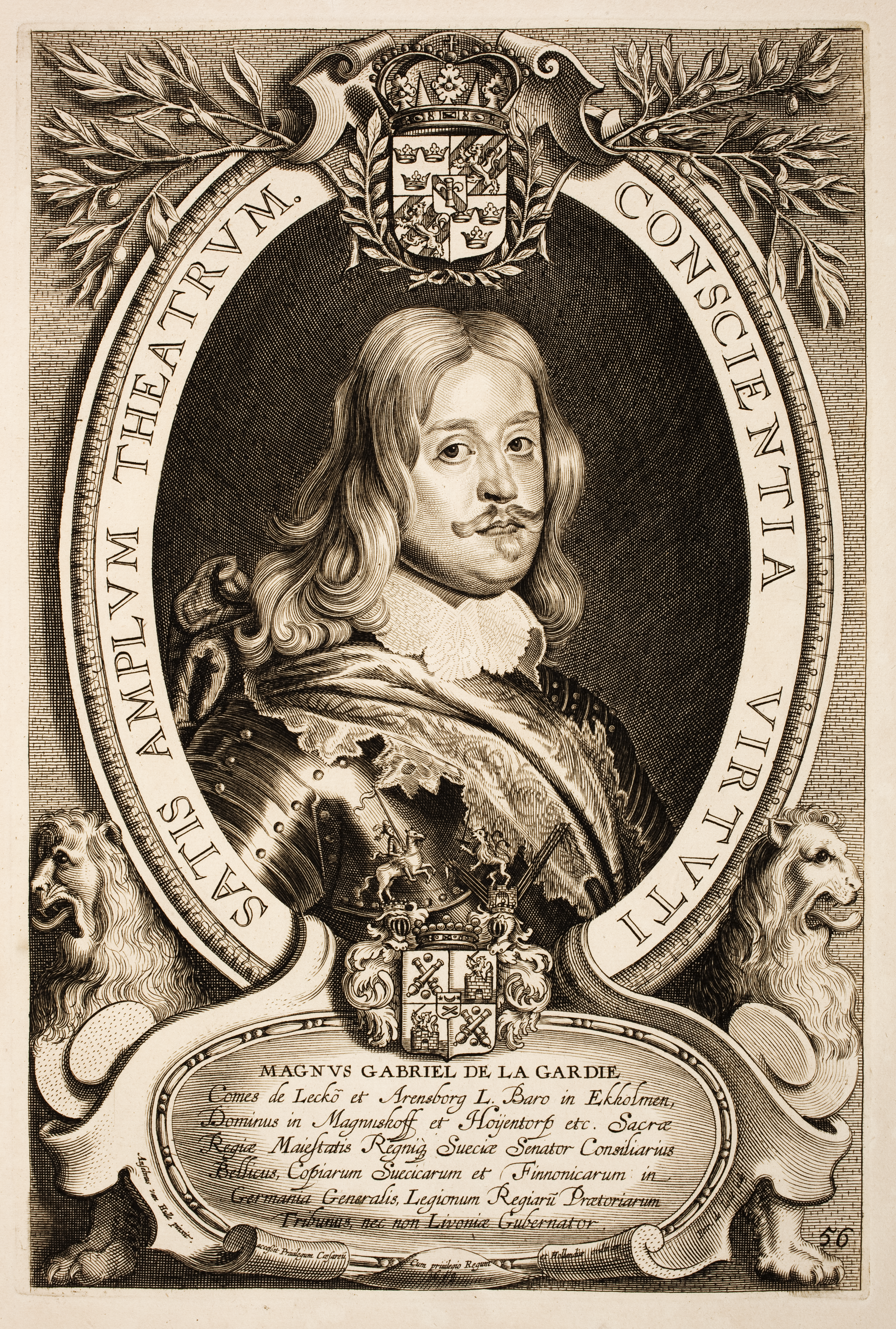

Events from the year 1622 in Sweden

== Incumbents ==
- Monarch – Gustaf II Adolf

== Births ==
- 15 October - Magnus Gabriel De la Gardie, statesman and military (died 1686)
- 8 November - Charles X Gustav of Sweden, monarch (died 1660)
- Elizabeth Carlsdotter Gyllenhielm, courtier and illegitimate royal (died 1682)

== Deaths ==
- 25 January - Charles Philip, Duke of Södermanland, prince (died 1601)
- Jesper Mattson Cruus af Edeby, soldier and politician (died 1576)
