= 1537 in Sweden =

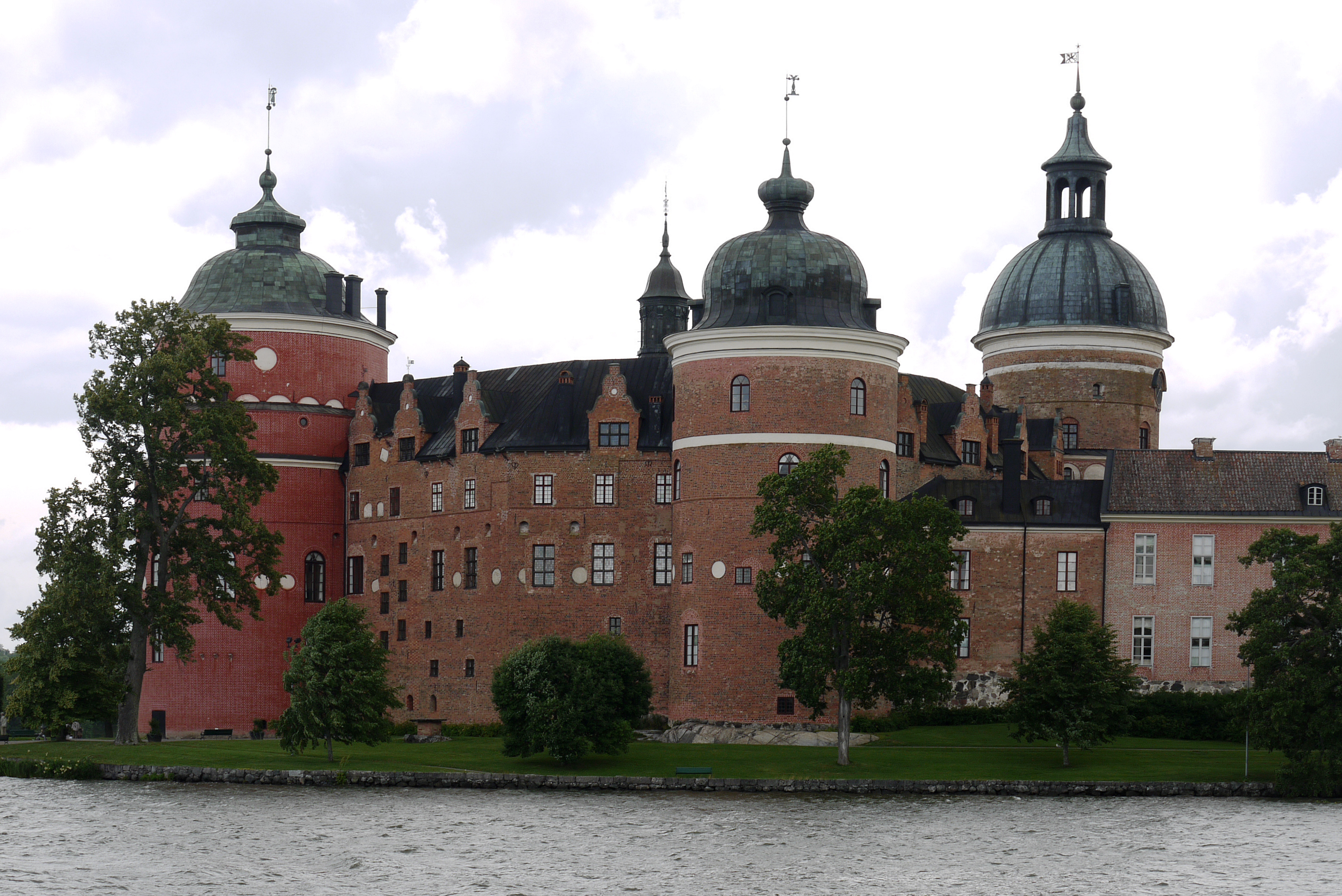

Events from the year 1537 in Sweden

== Incumbents ==
- Monarch – Gustav Vasa, also known as Gustav I, considered the most famous of Sweden's kings

== Events ==
- Gripsholm Castle is constructed.
- The first evangelical Catechism of Olaus Petri is published.
- A royal edict bans the public of Småland from hunting, gathering wood, and settling in the woods.

== Births ==
- 20 December - John III of Sweden, monarch (died 1592)
