= 1530 in Sweden =

Events from the year 1530 in Sweden

== Incumbents ==
- Monarch – Gustav I

== Events ==
- - Olaus Magnus is deposed from all offices in Sweden and his goods are confiscated by the crown.
- - En liten postilla by Olaus Petri

== Births ==
- - Laurentius Petri Gothus, second Lutheran archbishop (died 1579)
- - Jöran Persson, royal favorite and adviser (died 1568)
- - Klaus Fleming, admiral and governor (died 1597)
- - Clas Åkesson Tott, privy Councillor (died 1590)

== Deaths ==
- - Eric Trolle, regent (born 1460)
