= 1641 in Sweden =

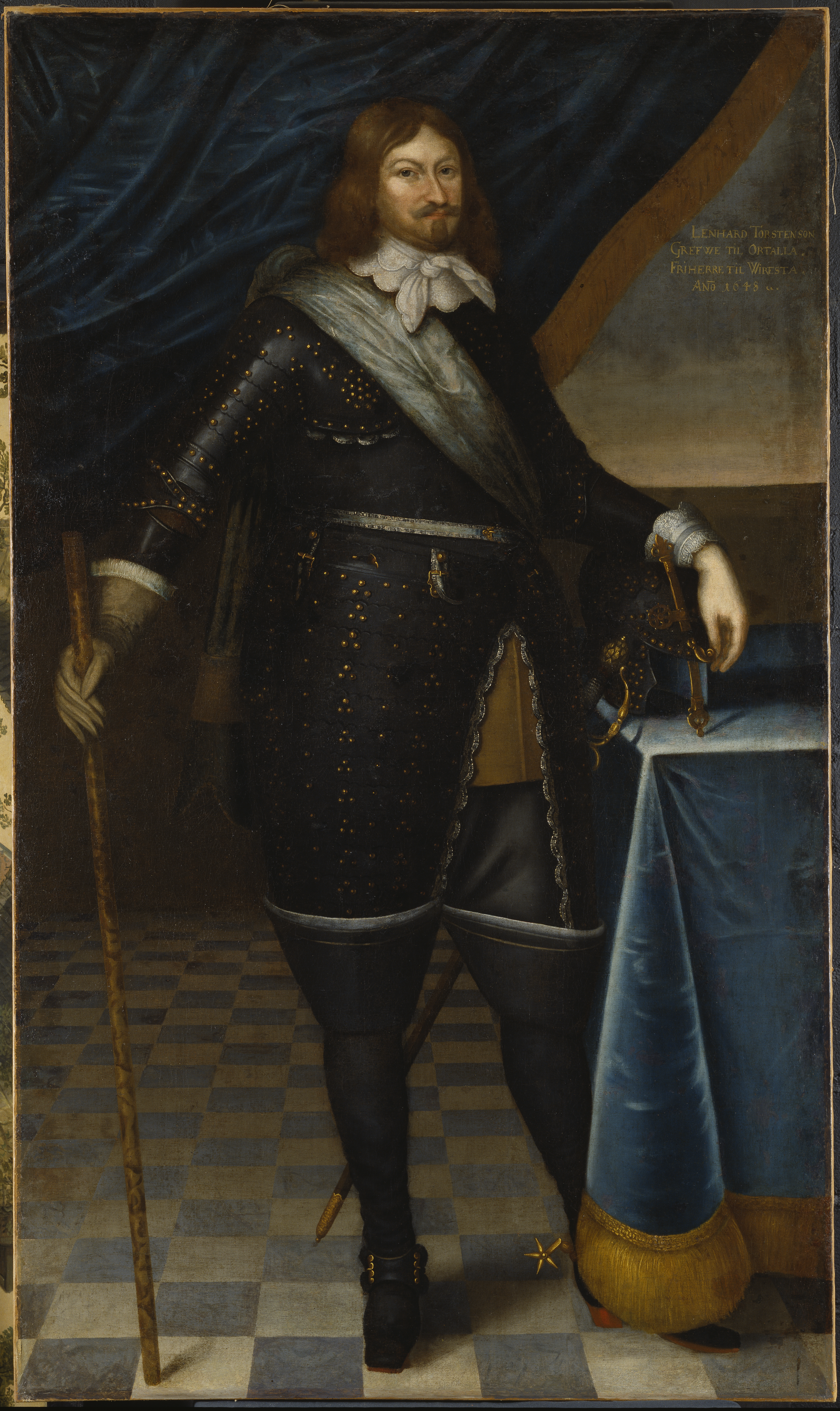
Lennart Torstenson

Events from the year 1641 in Sweden

1. Military Campaigns and the Thirty Years’ War:

• Sweden continued its involvement in the Thirty Years’ War (1618–1648), one of the most destructive conflicts in European history. At this time, Sweden was a major player in the Protestant camp and was actively engaged in military actions on the continent.

2. Political Governance:

• Sweden was under the rule of Queen Christina (Christina Augusta Vasa), who inherited the throne as a minor in 1632 after the death of her father, King Gustavus Adolphus. A regency council governed the country until 1644, when Christina reached adulthood.

3. Economic and Social Changes:

• Sweden continued to develop as a powerful military and economic force in Northern Europe. Reforms and measures to strengthen centralized control were ongoing.

4. Diplomatic Efforts:

• Sweden engaged in various diplomatic efforts to secure its influence and power in Europe, negotiating alliances and treaties with other European powers.

5. Naval and Maritime Activities:

• The Swedish navy continued to be active in the Baltic Sea, protecting Swedish interests and ensuring control over crucial trade routes. This period was crucial for Sweden's naval power, which was essential for its military campaigns during the Thirty Years’ War.

6. Economic Measures:

• Efforts to bolster the Swedish economy continued, particularly in mining and metallurgy, which were significant industries for Sweden at the time. The production of iron and copper was critical for both domestic use and export.

7. Cultural Developments:

• Queen Christina, known for her interest in the arts and sciences, began to foster an environment that would later make her court a center of culture and intellectual exchange. Although her most notable contributions came after she reached adulthood, the foundations were being laid during this period.

8. Administrative Reforms:

• The regency council implemented various administrative reforms to strengthen the central government and improve efficiency in governance. These reforms were aimed at consolidating power and ensuring more effective control over Sweden's expanding territories.

9. Religious Affairs:

• The Lutheran Church played a central role in Swedish society, and efforts were made to maintain religious uniformity and support the Protestant cause in the broader context of the Thirty Years’ War.

10. Colonial Interests:

• Sweden had colonial interests during this period, particularly in North America and the Caribbean. In 1641, the Swedish colony of New Sweden, located along the Delaware River in present-day Delaware, New Jersey, and Pennsylvania, continued to develop.

== Incumbents ==
- Monarch – Christina

== Events ==
- May - Lennart Torstensson is appointed field marshal and becomes the leader of the Swedish army during the Thirty Years' War in Germany. The Peace of Westphalia, which effectively ended the Thirty Years' War, was signed in 1648.

== Births ==
- 20 January - Anders Torstenson, member of the Privy Council, Governor-General of Estonia (died 1686)
- Urban Hjärne, chemist, geologist, physician and writer (died 1724)
- Fabian Wrede, Count of Östanå, politician (died 1712)
- Waldemar von Wrangel, soldier (died 1675)
- Hans Wachtmeister, admiral general of the Swedish Navy and advisor to King Charles XI of Sweden and King Charles XII of Sweden (died 1714)

== Deaths ==
- Johan Banér, Field Marshal in the Thirty Years' War (born 1596)
