= 1568 in Sweden =

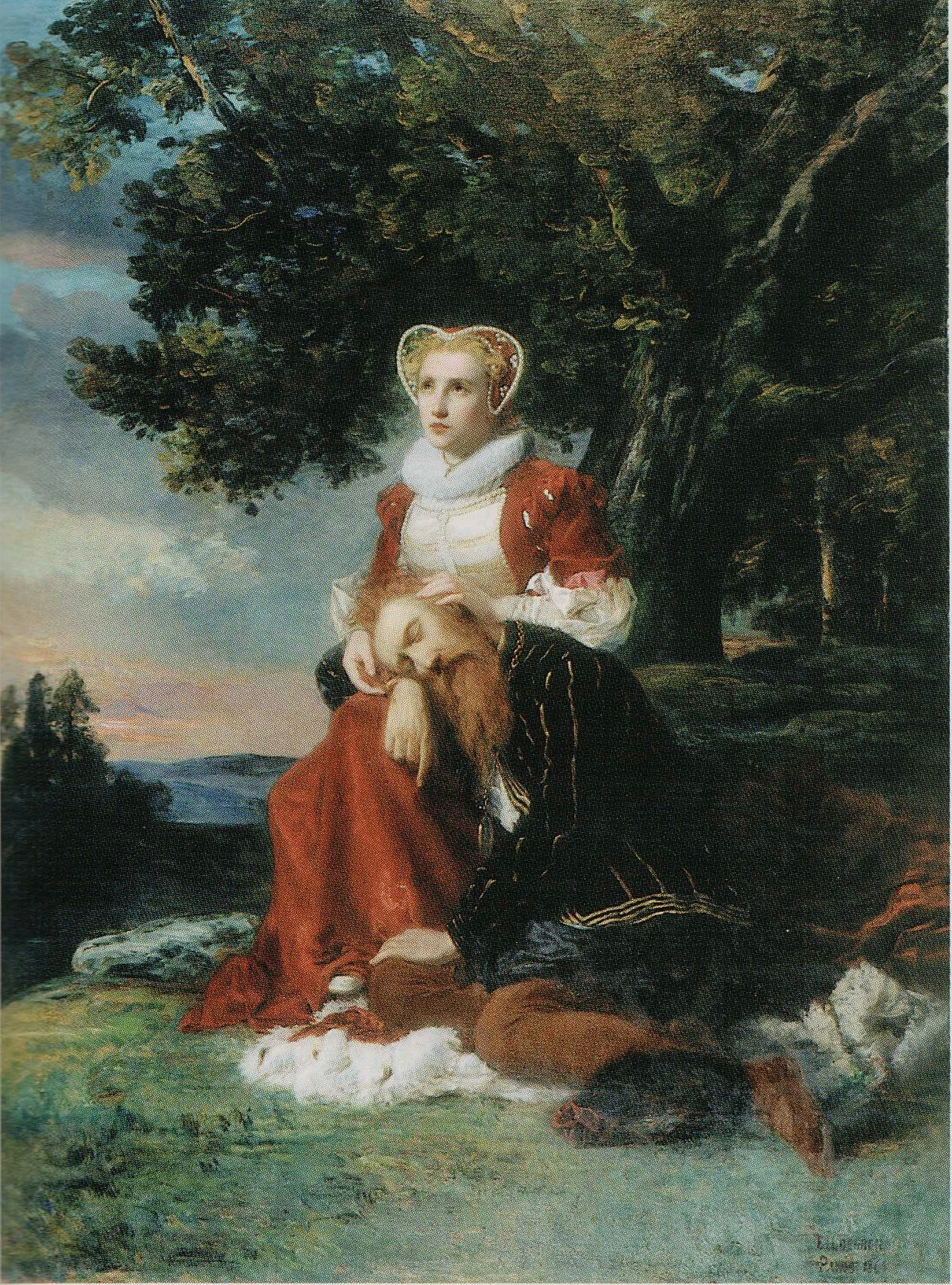
Erik XIV and Karin Månsdotter

The following events occurred in the year 1568 in Sweden.

== Incumbents ==
- Monarch – Eric XIV then John III

== Events ==
- January - The Danes under Daniel Rantzau march toward Stockholm, but because of the lack of reinforcements, the Danish army turns back toward Halland.
- May - Eric XIV recuperates from his mental illness and resume government.
- 4 July - The second, official wedding between Eric XIV and Karin Månsdotter.
- 5 July - Coronation of Karin Månsdotter.
- 12 July - The brothers of the King, John and Charles, rebels against Eric XIV in Östergötland, and John is declared regent by the rebels.
- August - The Swedes takes Sonnenburg on Ösel from the Danes.
- 1 September - The rebels conquer the capital of Stockholm.
- 22 September - Jöran Persson is arrested and executed.
- 29 September - The King is arrested, imprisoned and deposed by his brothers
- 30 September - John III is declared King.
- 30 September - Armistice with Poland.
- autumn - Armistice with the Teutonic Order.
- 18 November - Armistice with Denmark-Norway.

== Births ==
- 28 January - Gustav of Sweden (1568–1607), prince (died 1607)
- 17 May - Anna Vasa of Sweden, princess (died 1625)
- 25 June - Gunilla Bielke, queen (died 1597)
- - Sigrid Brahe, countess (died 1608)

== Deaths ==
- 22 September - Jöran Persson, royal adviser (died 1530)
- 22 September - Anna Pehrsönernas moder, alleged witch (Born unknown date)
