= Magdalena Andersdotter =

Norwegian shipowner

Magdalena Andersdotter (1590–1650) was a Norwegian shipowner. Alongside Beinta Broberg, she is one of the two best-known women in the pre-19th century history of the Faroe Islands.

== Life ==
Andersdotter was first married to the Norwegian merchant Niels Joenssøn of Bergen, and managed his business as a shipowner as a widow. She remarried the wealthy farmer and official Mikkjal Joensson (1566–1648) on the Faroe Islands in 1616.

Andersdotter became known for her many lawsuits and feuds against her husband. After her second marriage, she moved to the Faroe Islands, where she did not adjust well. The lawsuits focused around her husband's attempts to take control over her business as well as slander cases. She was also involved in feuds with her step-sons, who she refused to sit at the main table in her house hold. In 1633, she was banned from leaving the islands, but in 1634 she violated the ban and left for Bergen, and in 1635 she put her cause before the monarch. She returned to the islands in 1638 and was put on trial, but returned to the monarch in Copenhagen in 1639. It is unknown how the case was settled.

== In history ==
The lawsuits of Andersdotter has played a part in the history of the Faroe Islands and has been interpreted in various ways by the historians during the centuries. In the 1850s, she was made a symbol of the Faroeic resistance in protecting her rights toward the oppressors, in the 1890s as a bad example, and during the 20th century the portrait of her has been subject of physiological interpretations.
