= Beinta Broberg =

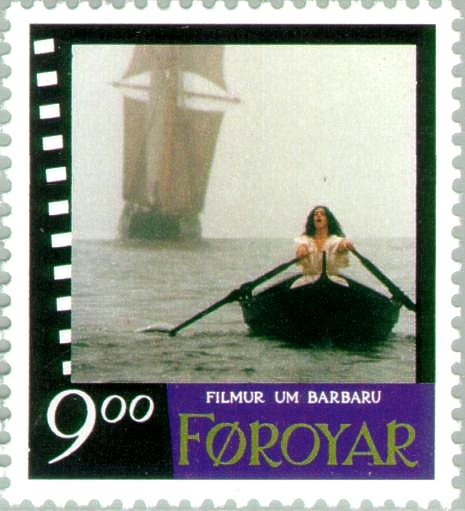
Norwegian Anneke von der Lippe as the Faroese Beinta Broberg in the 1997 Danish film Barbara

Bente Christine Broberg, known as Beinta Broberg, (1667 – 15 February 1752), is perhaps the best-known woman from the history of the Faroe Islands. She has been the inspiration for novels and a film.

== Biography ==
Beinta was born in Tórshavn, the daughter of Peder Sørensen and Birgitte Marie Jensdatter Bøgvad, both of whom belonged to the Danish upper class of officials on the islands. She was married three times: in 1695 to the vicar Jónas Jónasen (1660–1700) of Viðareiði, in 1702 to the vicar Niels Gregersen Aagaard (1672–1706) of Miðvágur in Vágar, and in 1706 (by widow conservation) to the vicar Peder Ditlevsen Arhboe (1675–1756), of Vágar.

In contrast to most of the widows of vicars in the period, she did not marry her husband's successor after the death of her first spouse in 1700, as was otherwise customary, but chose to stay on in the vicarage during her bereavement and thereafter marry the next Danish vicar sent to the islands. Her last spouse was deposed as vicar after conflicts with his parish in 1718. Judging by the investigation leading to his deposition, he seem to have been mentally ill. After this, they lived in poverty in Vágar.

She had one son and three daughters. However, only the name of one of her daughters is known.

== In folklore ==
In tradition and saga, Beinta is called Illa Beinta (Wicked Beinta), and is given the blame for the death of her first two spouses and the insanity of the third, as a bad employer for her servants, and as a witch. Contemporary documents describe her only indirectly, and do not confirm how true or false is the popular image of her, nor how active she was in the events of her life. Her true character is widely overshadowed by the many myths and legends surrounding her.

== Cultural references ==
- 1927 : Beinta by Hans Andrias Djurhuus, depicts her as an unhappy woman who contributes to the misfortunes of men without any personal responsibility.
- 1939 : Barbara by Jørgen-Frantz Jacobsen. Here she is depicted as "a child of nature", who lives according to her needs without thought of consequences.
- 1997 : Barbara, a film by Nils Malmros.

== See also ==
- Magdalena Andersdotter
