= 1592 in Sweden =

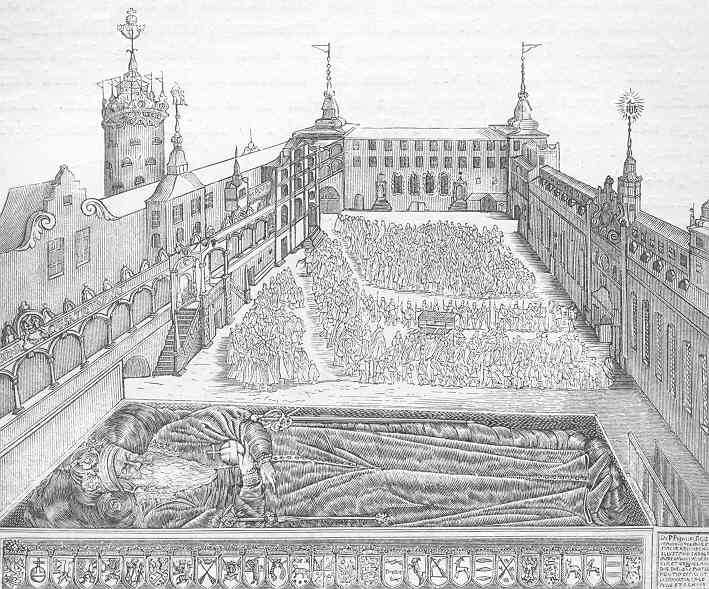
Johan III's grave

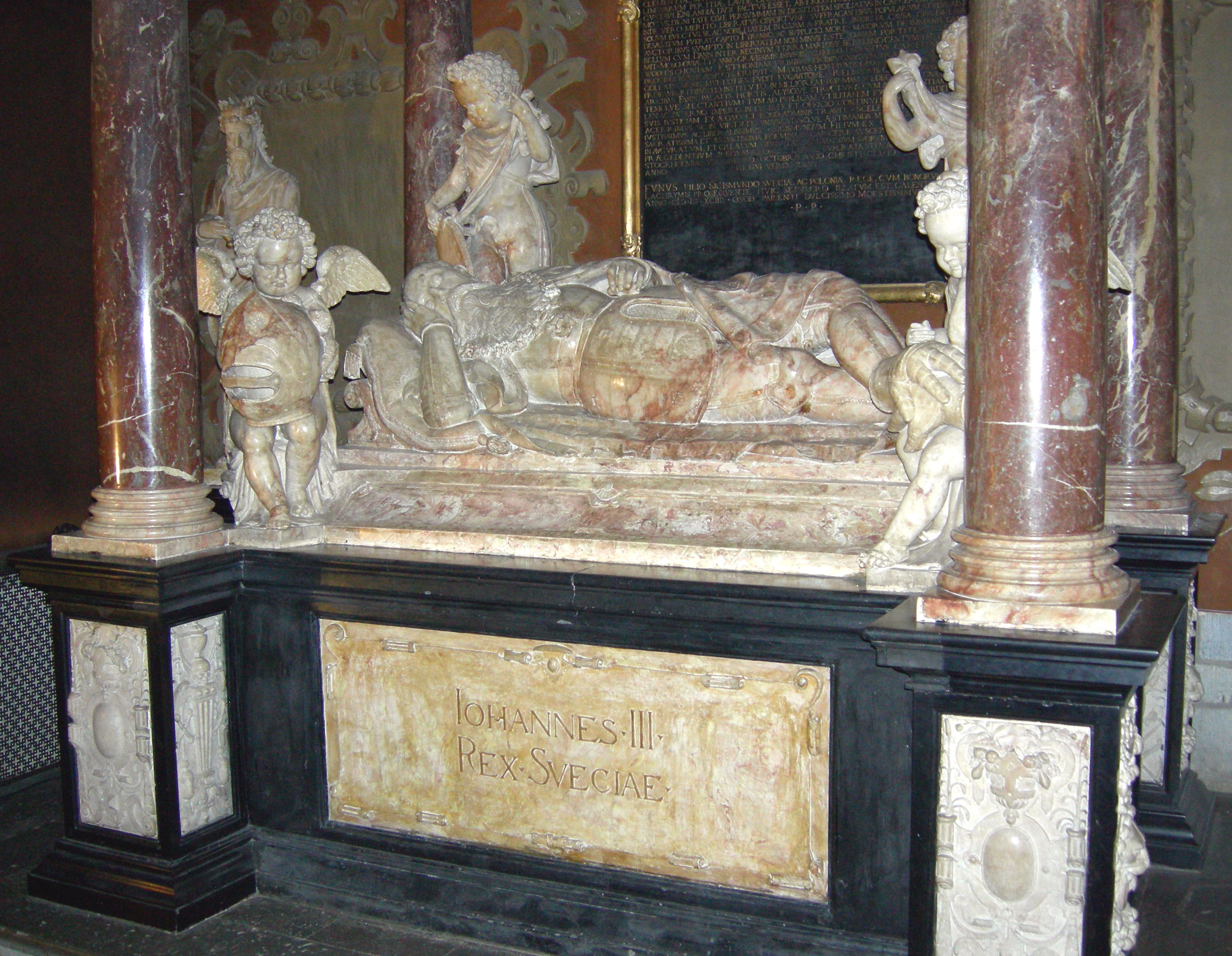
Tomb of John III in Uppsala Cathedral.

Events from the year 1592 in Sweden

== Incumbents ==
- Monarch – John III then Sigismund

== Events ==
- 8 July - The King's brother Duke Charles, is wed to Christina of Holstein-Gottorp in a ceremony attended by noted German travel writer and poet Michael Heberer, who pens a record of the events.
- 17 November - John III is succeeded by his son, the Polish electoral monarch Sigismund III Vasa, which create a personal union between Protestant Sweden and Catholic Poland. This is opposed by both the Royal Council and Duke Charles, who unite against him.

== Births ==
- 17 January - Sigrid Banér, Swedish letter writer (died 1669)
- March - Clas Fleming (admiral), admiral and administrator (died 1644)
- 22 October - Gustav Horn, Count of Pori, soldier and politician (died 1657)
- July 20 - Johan Björnsson Printz, governor of New Sweden (died 1663)
- 29 December - Johannes Matthiae Gothus, professor (died 1670)

== Deaths ==
- 17 November - John III, monarch (born 1537)
