= 1657 in Sweden =

Events from the year 1657 in Sweden

== Incumbents ==
- Monarch – Charles X Gustav

== Events ==
- June 1 – Dano-Swedish War (1657–1658): King Frederick III of Denmark signs a manifesto de facto declaring war on Sweden.
- July - The Stockholms Banco is opened.
- July 8 - Battle of Walk
- August 17 - Battle of Dirschau

== Births ==
- March 28 - Ebba Maria De la Gardie, poet and singer (died 1697)
- July 11 - Pehr Scheffer, baron and civil servant (died 1731)
- August 11 - Carl Du Rietz, nobleman and court squire (died 1708)
- November 10 - Göran Johan von Knorring, nobleman and military officer (died 1726)
- Benedictus Theodori Littorin, priest and classicist of Greek literature (died 1721)

== Deaths ==
- May 5 - Anders Eriksson Hästehufvud, officer (born 1577)
- May 10 - Gustav Horn, Count of Pori, politician (born 1592)
- September 7 - Arvid Wittenberg, count, field marshal and privy councillor (born 1606)
- December 5 - Johan Oxenstierna, politician (born 1611)
- Stormor i Dalom, vicars wife and local profile (born 1594)
