= 1547 in Sweden =

Events from the year 1547 in Sweden

== Incumbents ==
- Monarch – Gustav I

== Events ==
- - Dissolution of the Black Friars' Monastery of Stockholm.

== Births ==
- - Princess Sophia of Sweden, (died 1611)
- - Gustaf Banér, privy Councillor (died 1600)
