= 1629 in Sweden =

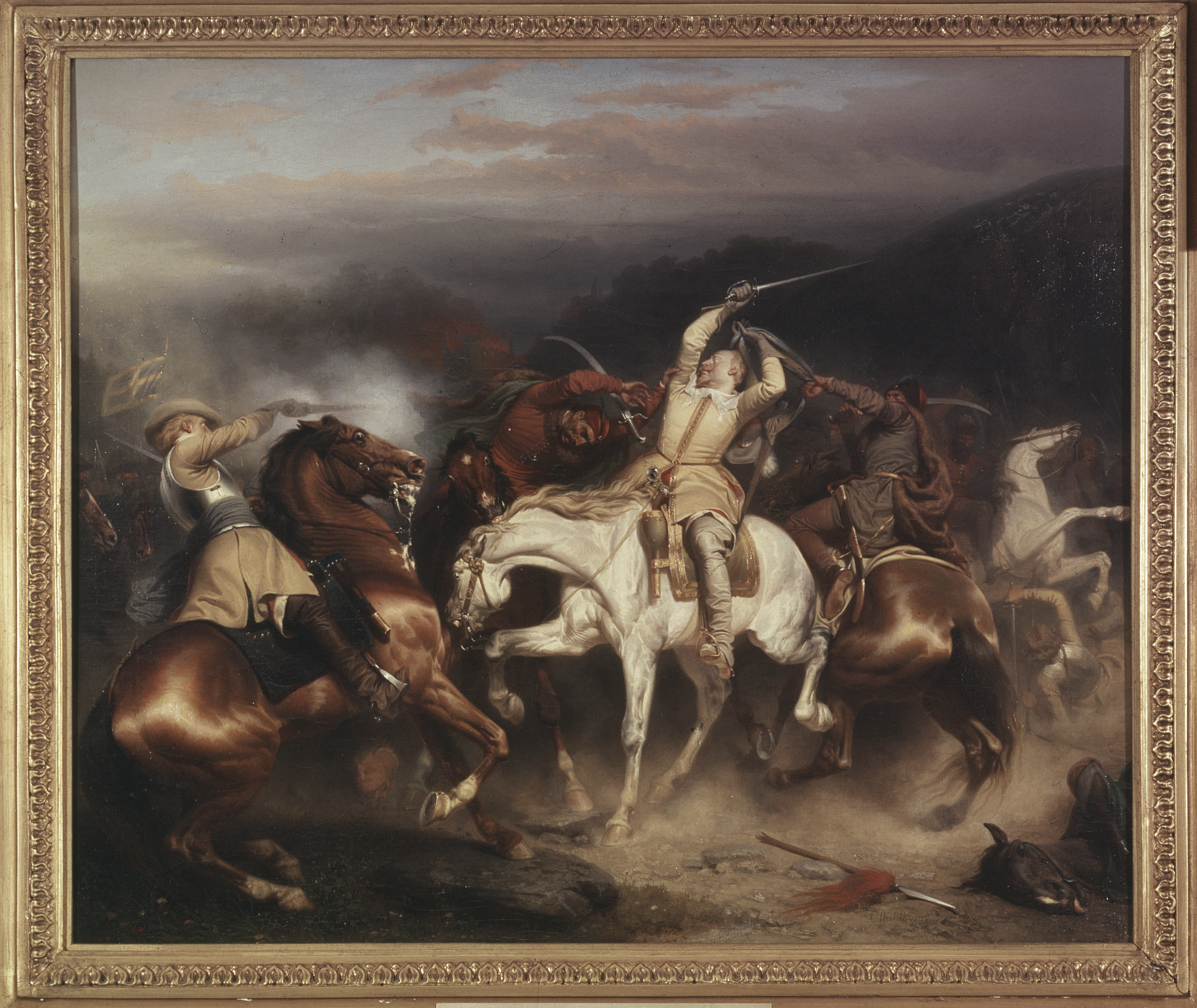
Gustav II Adolf at Stuhm

The Year 1629 in Sweden was marked by significant diplomatic developments, particularly the signing of the Truce of Altmark on September 26. This Agreement brought to an end to the Polish-Swedish War (1626-1629), a conflict rooted in a struggle for control over the Baltic Sea and its lucrative trade routes. Signed between Sweden, By King Gustavus Adolphus, and the Polish-Lithuanian Commonwealth under King Sigismund III Vasa, the truce granted Sweden control over several strategic ports in the Duchy of Prussia. Such as Elbląg, Pillau, and Memel. This expanded Sweden’s influence over the Baltic trade, providing significant economic gains and solidifying its status as a major regional power. The cessation of hostilities also allowed Gustavus Adolphus to redirect his military efforts towards involvement in the Thirty Years’ War a move that would have lasting consequences for both Swedish and European politics.

== Incumbents ==
- Monarch – Gustaf II Adolf

== Events ==
- 12 February – Battle of Górzno
- 25 September – Truce of Altmark

== Births ==
- August 18 – Agneta Horn, memoir writer (died 1672)
- 21 October – Adolph John I, Count Palatine of Kleeburg, (died 1689)
- Ebba Sparre, courtier (died 1662)

== Deaths ==
- 18 August - Vendela Skytte, writer, poet and Lady of Letters (born 1608)
