= 1608 in Sweden =

Events from the year 1608 in Sweden

== Incumbents ==
- Monarch – Charles IX

== Events ==
- - Swedish conquest of Dünamünde, Kokenhusen and Fellin.
- - The King has the laws of the Kingdom, the Kristofers landslag from 1442, printed and published and thereby favors that before the conflicting Magnus Erikssons landslag from the 1350s: the law is also amended with the appendix of the Law of Moses, which makes them more severe than before. This law is applied to the country while the Stadslagen is confirmed as the law of the cities, an order which was to be in place until 1736.
- - The Riksdag of Örebro discuss a peace offer from Poland, and the King attempt to unite Lutheranism and Calvinism.

== Births ==
- 8 December - Vendela Skytte, poet and scholar (died 1629)
- - Arnold Johan Messenius, enfant terrible and historiographer (died 1651)

== Deaths ==
- - Sigrid Brahe, notorious countess (born 1568)
