= 1539 in Sweden =

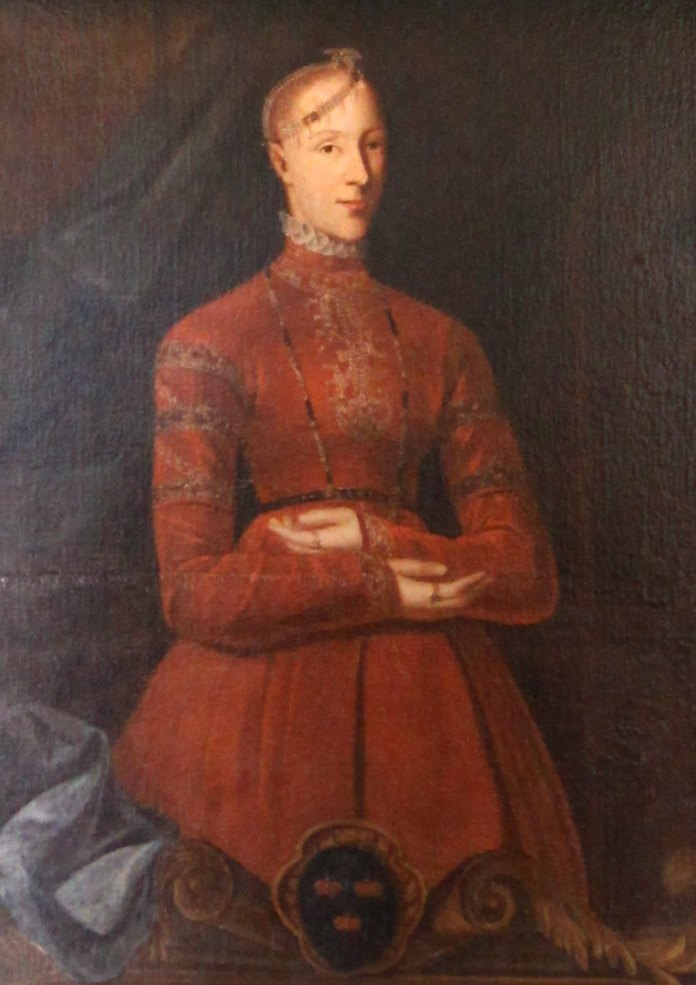

Events from the year 1539 in Sweden

== Incumbents ==
- Monarch – Gustav I

== Events ==
- - The Legal, Financial and Administrative Services Agency is founded.
- - The German Georg Norman is employed as teacher of the Crown Prince and organizer of the Swedish church.
- - The Roman mass is banned.
- - 11th anniversary of Gustav the 1's Reign

== Births ==
- 6 June - Catherine Vasa, princess (died 1610)
- - Karin Hansdotter, royal lover (died 1596)
