= 1662 in Sweden =

Events from the year 1662 in Sweden

== Incumbents ==
- Monarch – Charles XI

== Events ==
- The work on the new Drottningholm Palace is started
- The mourning period of the late monarch is terminated.
- Dueling is banned through the Duellplakatet
- Old Farmer's Almanac published in Swedish

== Births ==
- Maria Aurora von Königsmarck, courtier, amateur actress, royal mistress and famous beauty (died 1728)
- Beata Sparre, courtier and spy (died 1724)
- Sofia Drake, landowner and letter writer (died 1741)

== Deaths ==
- Axel Lillie, soldier and politician (born 1603)
- Elizabeth Ribbing, secret royal spouse (born 1596)
- Ebba Sparre, courtier and favorite (born 1629)
