= 1663 in Sweden =

Events from the year 1663 in Sweden

== Incumbents ==
- Monarch – Charles XI

== Events ==
- The Swedish Collegium medicum is founded to supervise the medical professions.
- The pirate Gustav Skytte is exposed, trialed and executed.
- Colony of the Swedish Gold Coast seized by the Netherlands, and integrated into Dutch Gold Coast.
- Stockholms Banco, Sweden’s first bank, suffers a bank run after over-issuing credit notes; in 1663 both the Crown and Chancellor Magnus Gabriel De la Gardie take large loans paid in the bank’s notes, accelerating its collapse and ultimately leading to the foundation of Sveriges Riksbank in 1668.

== Births ==
- 16 April – Maria Elizabeth of Zweibrücken, princess (died 1748)
- 20 August – Amalia von Königsmarck, painter, actress and poet (died 1740)
- unknown – Gävle Boy, notorious witch finder (died 1676)

== Deaths ==
- 8 March – Hans Christoff von Königsmarck, soldier (born 1600)
- 21 April – Gustav Skytte, pirate (born 1637)
- 3 May – Johan Björnsson Printz, governor (born 1592)
