= Widow inheritance =

Cultural and social practice

Widow inheritance (also known as bride inheritance) is a cultural and social practice whereby a widow is required to marry a male relative of her late husband, often his brother. The practice is more commonly referred as a levirate marriage, examples of which can be found in ancient and biblical times.

The practice was instituted as a means for the widow to have someone to support her and her children financially and to keep her late husband's wealth within the family bloodline. When the practice was initiated, women were responsible for the house chores, and men were the providers. If a woman lost her husband, she would, therefore, have no one to provide for the remaining family. Because her in-laws would not want someone outside of the family's blood line to inherit her late husband's estate, she was required to marry within the family.

In different cultures, that can have various forms and functions that serve in relative proportions as a social protection for and control over the widow and her children. She may have the right to require her late husband's extended family to provide her with a new man, or she may conversely have the obligation to accept the man put forward by the family with no real prospect of turning him down if her birth family does not accept her back into its home.

The custom is sometimes justified on the basis that it ensures that the wealth does not leave the patrilineal family. It is also sometimes justified as a protection for the widow and her children. The practice has existed in varied cultures and historical periods and is a custom in several Sub-Saharan Africa nations and ethnic groups.

== Judaism ==
A form of widow inheritance is part of Mosaic law in which it is known as levirate marriage (see yibbum). A feature of that practice is that the dead husband's brother must marry his dead brother's widow. That applies, however, only if the widow (and consequently the deceased husband) has no children. However, there are mechanisms whereby either party may avoid such a marriage.

== Afghanistan ==
In Pashtun communities, the code known as Pashtunwali requires a widow to marry her dead husband's brother or cousin regardless of her will. The code also requires her children to be treated as children of the new husband. The Taliban campaigned against the practice as being against shariah law.

== Widowhood in Sub-Saharan Africa ==
The circumstances of widows in Sub-Saharan African nations are complicated by both economic challenges and traditional social expectations. As of 2015, over 9 million widows face extreme poverty in sub-Saharan Africa. In many nations, policy contributes to the inability of widows to acquire economic independence after the death of their husbands. A widow may need to abide by widow inheritance traditions and remain with the husband's family, often requiring her to marry the husband's brother, to ensure that she remains in possession of property.

Widow inheritance traditions are particularly prevalent in Sub-Saharan Africa compared to the rest of the continent, and such traditions are reported across many nations in the region. (Note: Countries in which widow inheritance traditions are prevalent include Angola, Botswana, Republic of the Congo (RotC), Democratic Republic of the Congo (DRC), Côte d'Ivoire, Ghana, Kenya, Lesotho, Malawi, Nigeria, Rwanda, Senegal, Eswatini (Swaziland), Tanzania, Uganda, Zambia and Zimbabwe) Widows face a lack of legal rights to family property because of gender-discriminatory legal systems. They are unlikely to have the resources to use legal systems as a means of fighting traditional power structures. There are many formal and informal rules concerning the inheritance of property, particularly land for rural women, that inhibit stable economic conditions. Those limitations cause widows to be coerced into inheritance traditions as a means of maintaining stability for their families. These widow inheritance traditions often include "cleansing" rituals, depending on the traditional culture of a given region.

In many Sub-Saharan regions, such as within the Ovambo culture of Namibia, formal and informal structures of gender inequality force widows to sacrifice their independence for inheritance traditions within the late husband's family or externally. Widow inheritance often emerges to combat property loss and social rejection and to forced remarriage to a brother of the deceased husband is a common widow inheritance tradition that many traditional cultures promote.

Many modern legal systems in Sub-Saharan Africa, such as in Tanzania, have attempted to combat the customary law that enforces structures of inheritance and disinheritance. However, poor application and enforcement of the modern legal systems ensures that customary law remains the default in countries such as Ghana, Nigeria, Tanzania, Zambia and Zimbabwe.

=== Premature widowhood ===
Widow inheritance traditions are exacerbated by the prevalence of premature widowhood across Sub-Saharan Africa, such as in Igbo people in Nigeria. Premature widowhood is linked to severe consequences of poverty, as there are intergenerational implications of young women with dependent children facing widowhood. Women who were dependent on their husbands as their source of income face major challenges if they become widows, as there are many places like Kenya in Sub-Saharan Africa in which women's paid employment is scarce, low paid and often socially unacceptable. In many regions, female financial independence is difficult to achieve, and a single woman is also socially unacceptable. A severe lack of state welfare provisions, such as healthcare, childcare systems and education, encourage widows to find other modes of financial stability. Those factors greatly contribute to the perseverance of widow inheritance traditions.

=== Disinheritance practices ===
Widows are motivated to remarry and partake in widow inheritance traditions because of disinheritance practices in Sub-Saharan Africa. Disinheritance occurs when widows are dispossessed by their late husband's family, which can take the form of losing control of family land, outright eviction, abandonment of familial relations and (in more dire conditions) confiscation of the children by the late husband's family. Rural Sub-Saharan African women face a level of disinheritance that is higher than in any other global region. Sub-Saharan widows, particularly in Kenya and Nigeria, experience a higher prevalence of eviction risk by relatives. Disinheritance and property theft have been reported by both rural and urban Nigerian widows. The Immigration and Refugee Board of Canada depicts a common situation in the following summation of expert evidence provided to them:

...if the man died without the couple having had children, it would be much more likely that the family [of the deceased husband] would challenge the widow's inheritance rights... In rural settings, widows are at a particular disadvantage where the husband's family is much more likely to go directly to traditional courts [using customary law], which "always rule against widows". In an urban setting the regular courts [civil courts] may rule in her favour, but the widow will often face the obstacles of getting the property back from the family.

— Immigration and Refugee Board of Canada (August 2000)

The disinheritance of widows has been coined as "grabbing" across Sub-Saharan Africa. The term "grabbing" refers to the immediate actions of eviction and property theft, and those customs are often enabled and bolstered by legal systems. For example, in Eswatini, widows are not given any rights to property in the eyes of the law. These grabbing traditions are prevalent in Angola, Botswana, RotC, DRC, Eswatini, Ivory Coast, Ghana, Kenya, Lesotho, Malawi, Namibia, Nigeria, Rwanda, Senegal, Tanzania, Uganda, Zambia and Zimbabwe. Widow inheritance and re-marriage becomes a necessary "safety net" for widows that do not have other options to maintain livelihood.

=== Gender inequality and ancient traditions ===
Some African scholars maintain that widowhood rites are an ancient practice in Africa and Nigeria (including Yoruba and Igbo cultures), and that they are harmful to African women, as they are mistreated, blamed for murdering the deceased husband, and inherited as property by another man from the husband's family.

In his article "Widowhood Practices in Some Nigerian Societies. A Retrospective Examination" (2015), Joseph Olukayode Akinbi notes that modernization has improved the situation of Nigerian women by preventing certain aspects of widowhood rites in some cases. For example, if a woman works in a bank or company, it is less likely that she will be forced to wear black for a year or not leave her house for a month, practices that are part of widowhood rites in some communities.

=== Forms ===
Widow inheritance can take many different modes: forced remarriage to a brother of the deceased husband, returning to the widow's parents' home or a more exploitive inheritance to professional traveling widow inheritors. The prevalence of each form varies between sub-Saharan regions and across ethnic groups, and patterns of kinship and inheritance patterns cannot be ascribed uniformly because of stark differences in ethnic traditions. For example, in Kenya, for the Nandi, it is infrequent for a widow to participate in levirate marriage, but for the Luo, widow inheritance is a cultural requirement.

Inheritance is often distinct from marriage, as "cleansing" practices often are a prerequisite for a widow after the death of her husband. Widows are then inherited by a man, often her late-husband's brother, after she has been "cleansed", or ritually purified. This tradition is enforced in the Luo in Kenya, as a woman must engage in sexual intercourse without a condom to achieve purity before she can remarry. Many men have commercialized and exploited the practice by becoming professional widow inheritors, as many in-law relatives of widows are less inclined to perform the "cleansing" practices themselves for fear of contracting HIV from the widow. It is becoming common in Kenya for professional widow-inheritors to receive compensation for completing inheritance practices. Professional inheritors travel to different communities to inherit widows for financial gain, and often coerce widows to comply with sexual rituals in exchange for providing support.

Many widows enter an inheritance contract for companionship and social, economic, and emotional support, and widow inheritance for these purposes is generally long-term and monogamous. Widow inheritance for the purpose of executing a sexual ritual or "cleansing" is generally short-term and often involves more inheritors.

=== "Cleansing" practices ===
"Cleansing" is a form of ritual purification rites being culturally prescribed for women after the death of her husband and often involving forced sexual intercourse with a male "inheritor" of the widow. The practice has not been systematically outlawed across Sub-Saharan Africa but rather is encouraged in many rural communities such as the Luo in Kenya and Tanzania and the Igbo in Nigeria. Cleansing occurs since it is believed to free the widow from a supernatural connection to her dead husband's spirit. It is very common for such "cleansing" procedures to be the only choice that widows have in the wake of their husband's death, as without a proper cleansing, the widow and her family will be socially rejected. The rituals are frequently traumatic violations in which widows may be forced to drink the water in which their dead husband's body was washed and are coerced into sex with a relative or inheritor.

In extreme circumstances, widows may be required to "have sex with their husband's dead body" to complete a cleansing ritual. These traditions are rooted in spiritual fears of contamination, and have been reported in a number of countries of Sub-Saharan Africa. (Note: Countries reported as having traditions of spiritual contamination include: Angola, Botswana, Republic of Congo, Democratic Republic of Congo, Côte d'Ivoire, Eswatini, Ghana, Kenya, Lesotho, Malawi, Nigeria, Rwanda, Senegal, Tanzania, Uganda, Zambia and Zimbabwe. It has been noted, in addition, in some ebola-affected countries also.) The superstitions of "evil spirits" inhabiting widows before "cleansing" are norms in many communities, and widows are often not permitted to work or interact with those outside their families until the cleansing is executed. Women who violate those norms may face severe social stigma and repercussions in their community.

Widow inheritance relationships centre on "cleansing" the widow after the death of her husband, as well as fulfilling the goal of furthering the late husband's lineage. Sexual intercourse can function as a means of "cleansing" by bearing children for the husband's family, sexual companionship and other sexual rituals that are associated with widows. A widow is often required to engage in ritual sex during the establishment of homes and during food production seasons, often to protect the widow or her family members.

=== Legislation ===
The Convention on the Elimination of All Forms of Discrimination Against Women (CEDAW) was adopted in 1979 by the United Nations General Assembly and has been ratified by 189 states, including the African nations except Somalia (where the widow-inheritance custom, known as Dumaal, is practiced) and Sudan. CEDAW includes a provision on Widow inheritance that asserts that "State Parties shall take all appropriate measures to eliminate discrimination against women in all matters relating to marriage and family relations and in particular shall ensure, on a basis of equality of men and women: the same rights for both spouses in respect of the ownership, acquisition, enjoyment and disposition of property." Although CEDAW broadly rejects widow inheritance in the eyes of the law, informal practice and more localized law has not followed that international guidance.

Although many African nations practice widow inheritance without explicit legalization, Zambia's custom of widow inheritance was explicitly legalised by the 1926 Deceased Brothers Married Widows Act, Chapter 57 of the Laws of Zambia regardless of consent by the deceased husband's family. In Tanzania, widows are given equal rights to inheritance under the constitution, but customary law overrules the nation's legislation, especially in rural areas. Customary law requires widow inheritance practices although Tanzania largely condemns inheritance in national rhetoric. Although inheritance of a widow by the husband's family and disinheritance practices of eviction are illegal in Namibia, the practices continue because of the country's fragile legal system. Namibia has seen legislation changes in the past decades to account for women's rights after the death of her husband, especially in the proposal of the Communal Land Reform Act of 2002.

Some African nations have enacted legislation in the past two decades to combat the social justice concerns of widowhood. The Criminal Code Amendment Act of Ghana criminalized subjecting a woman to widowhood rites, and those who violate this act are guilty of misdemeanors in the eyes of the law. In Nigeria, in Enugu State, the Prohibition of the Infringement of a Widow's and a Widower's Fundamental Rights Law of 2001, outlawed compelling a widow or widower to vacate the matrimonial home and gave widows options other than inheritance practices after the death of their husbands.

=== HIV/AIDS related concerns ===
Widow inheritance traditions dramatically increase the risk of infection with HIV and other sexually transmitted diseases, such as Hepatitis B, for the widow and the widow inheritor. As the HIV/AIDS epidemic began in the 1970s, the practice of widow inheritance evolved in response to the increased risk. Primarily, premature widowhood increased prevalence dramatically as many men died of HIV/AIDS. Secondarily, brothers of the widow's late husband were more reluctant to partake in "cleansing" rituals due to the high mortality rate of the disease. Many of these young widows suffered from HIV/AIDS themselves, and professional widow-inheritance emerged as a response to the growing demand for widow-inheritance traditions to continue despite the new risks. Although professional widow-inheritance began as a response to the HIV/AIDS crisis, it also contributes to the transmission of HIV/AIDS as professional inheritors move from village to village performing "cleansing" rituals. Additionally, it is frequent that using a condom during a sexual rite is considered to break the custom of inheritance, and condoms are largely avoided in inheritance relationships.

In many circumstances, such as for Luo in Kenya, if a widow refuses inheritance from a professional widow inheritor, frequently out of fear of HIV/AIDS, she is often forced off her husband's land. HIV/AIDS concerns are further exacerbated in those conditions, as widows are often pushed into sex work to make a living as employment prospects for both women and widows can be difficult.

The practice of "cleansing" is recognised as a serious concern for the HIV/AIDS pandemic, and there is a link between widow inheritance, property rights and the spread of the disease. Professional inheritance and "cleansing" traditions have been linked to the spread of HIV/AIDS in Kenya, and in many African countries, including Uganda, Malawi, Zambia, Ghana, Senegal, Côte d'Ivoire, Republic of the Congo, Democratic Republic of Congo and Nigeria, Widow inheritance is commonly viewed as contributing to the rapid spread of HIV.

Widows are often expected to fulfill various sexual rituals within her community, as is common in the Luo community, such as sexual intercourse during the establishment of a home, during agricultural cycles, or during funeral or marriage ceremonies. If a widow has not been inherited by her brother-in-law but is rather a professional widow-inheritor, her risk of contracting HIV increases as she must find a partner to engage with in the ritual. Many widows are aware of the greater risk for HIV that they face by engaging in "cleansing" and inheritance rituals, but the pressure of cultural expectations and ensuring livelihood needs are met complicates their ability to avoid contracting the disease.

Attempts to modify the law in many Sub-Saharan African nations have been in response to the HIV/AIDS concerns of the widow-inheritance practice, rather than concerns regarding the emotional trauma of inheritance "cleansing". However, modifications to formal law are often ineffective without informal implementations of changes to traditional practices. Health officials in Malawi unsuccessfully banned widow "cleansing" but persuaded some traditional leaders to encourage condom usage and punish cleansers who force women into unprotected sex. In Zambia, the AIDS Care and Prevention Department at Chikankata Hospital found success in encouraging alternative ritualistic methods of "cleansing" that do not involve sexual practices, and the chiefs in the Chikankata District area eventually outlawed ritual cleansing by sexual intercourse in the 1990s.

=== Effects on widows' children ===
Premature widowhood results in a higher number of widows with dependent children, and the children of widows are often faced with dire experiences as a result of the socioeconomic consequences of widow inheritance. When a widow is faced with disinheritance practices, the consequences of the loss of income after the husband's death extend to the children. The lack of welfare provisions for the family, especially healthcare, childcare, and education, have severe impacts on the wellbeing and development of children. In extreme scenarios, disinheritance and "grabbing" can also involve the confiscation of children by the husband's family. If a widow is disinherited or homeless after the death of her husband, she faces risks of acute malnutrition, rape, prostitution, debilitating and fatal diseases, and exposure to adverse weather conditions. Those risks extend to widows' children if they remain with their mother post-disinheritance, and those hazards are compounded with loss of education and the risk of child labour.

When widows are inherited, it often has the purpose of keeping the property of the husband and the husband's male children inside the family. In many remarriages and widow inheritance traditions that involve the husband's brother, he will require sexual relations to produce children in the name of the dead husband, and the widow remains living with her children apart from the husband's brother, who often remains living with his own wife and children. In those scenarios and others that involve professional widow inheritors, children grow up with the absence of a father figure, and these can be damaging to mental health and development.

The stigma that surround widows before and after "cleansing" and widow inheritance extend to the children as well. Children are often ostracized from their peers when their mother is a widow, such as in the Luo in Kenya, are not allowed to circulate within the community before "cleansing" has occurred.

== See also ==
- Widow conservation
