= Hedvig Eleonora Klingenstierna =

Swedish noblewoman and lecturer

Hedvig Eleonora Beata Klingenstierna (born 1660), was a Swedish noblewoman. She was the first woman to give a lecture at a Swedish university.

A daughter of the bishop of Gothenburg, Zacharias Klingius, who was ennobled as Klingenstjerna, she was known as "a savant in skirts" for her great learning. She wrote an oration in Latin and gave a lecture at Linköping University, something unique for her gender in the age and likely the first woman to have done so in Northern Europe.

Klingenstierna married an Ensign Broman of the Dalarna Regiment.

== Sources ==
- Jane Stevenson: Women Latin Poets (2005), ISBN 0198185022, digitaliserad av Google
- Klingenstjerna, Hedvig Eleonora Beata i Wilhelmina Stålberg, Anteckningar om svenska qvinnor (1864)
- Hugo Hildebrand Hildebrandsson: Samuel Klingenstiernas levnad och verk: I. Levnadsteckning
- Gustaf Elgenstierna, Den introducerade svenska adelns ättartavlor. 1925–36.
