= 1596 in Sweden =

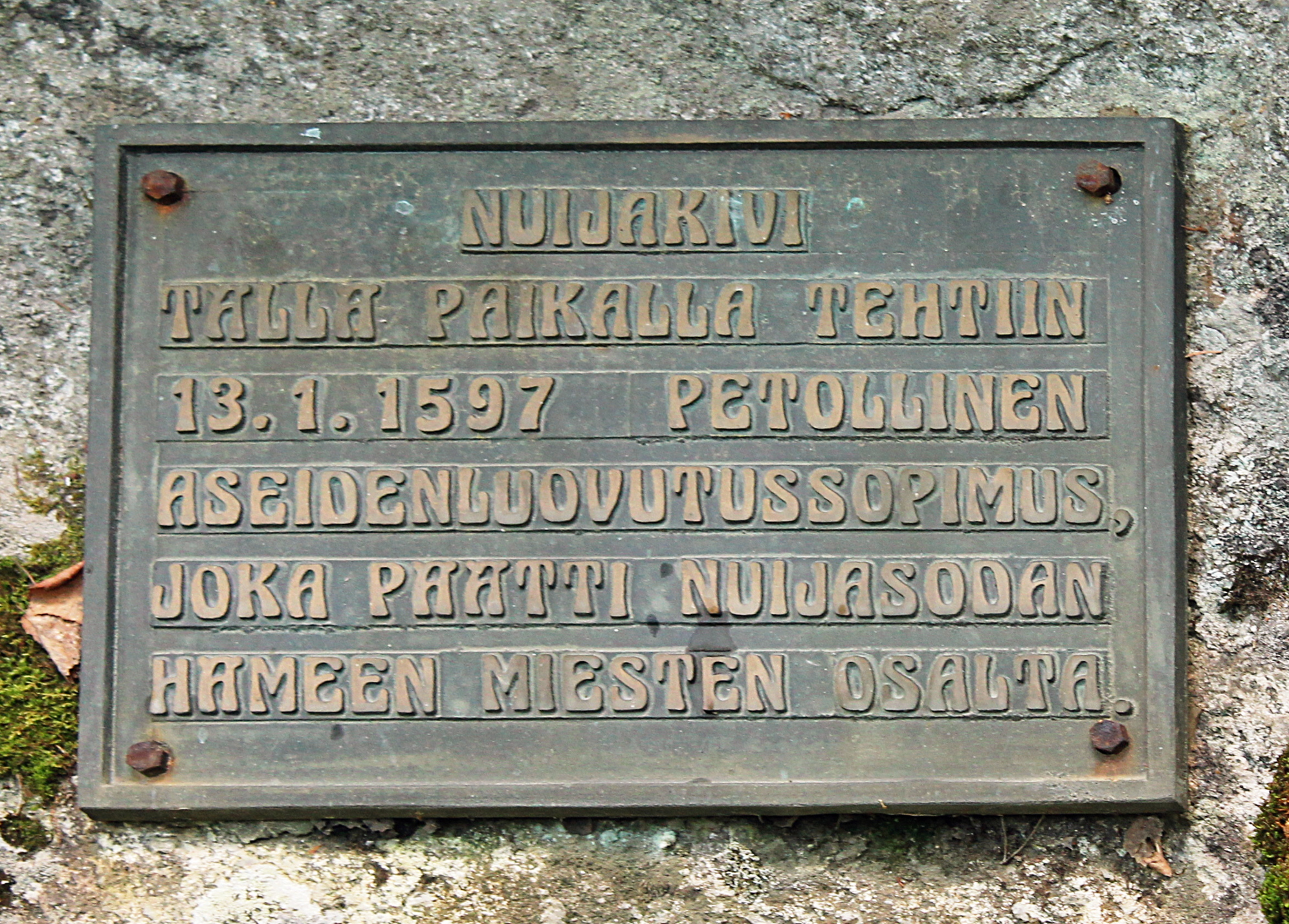
A memorial plaque dedicated to the fallen peasants

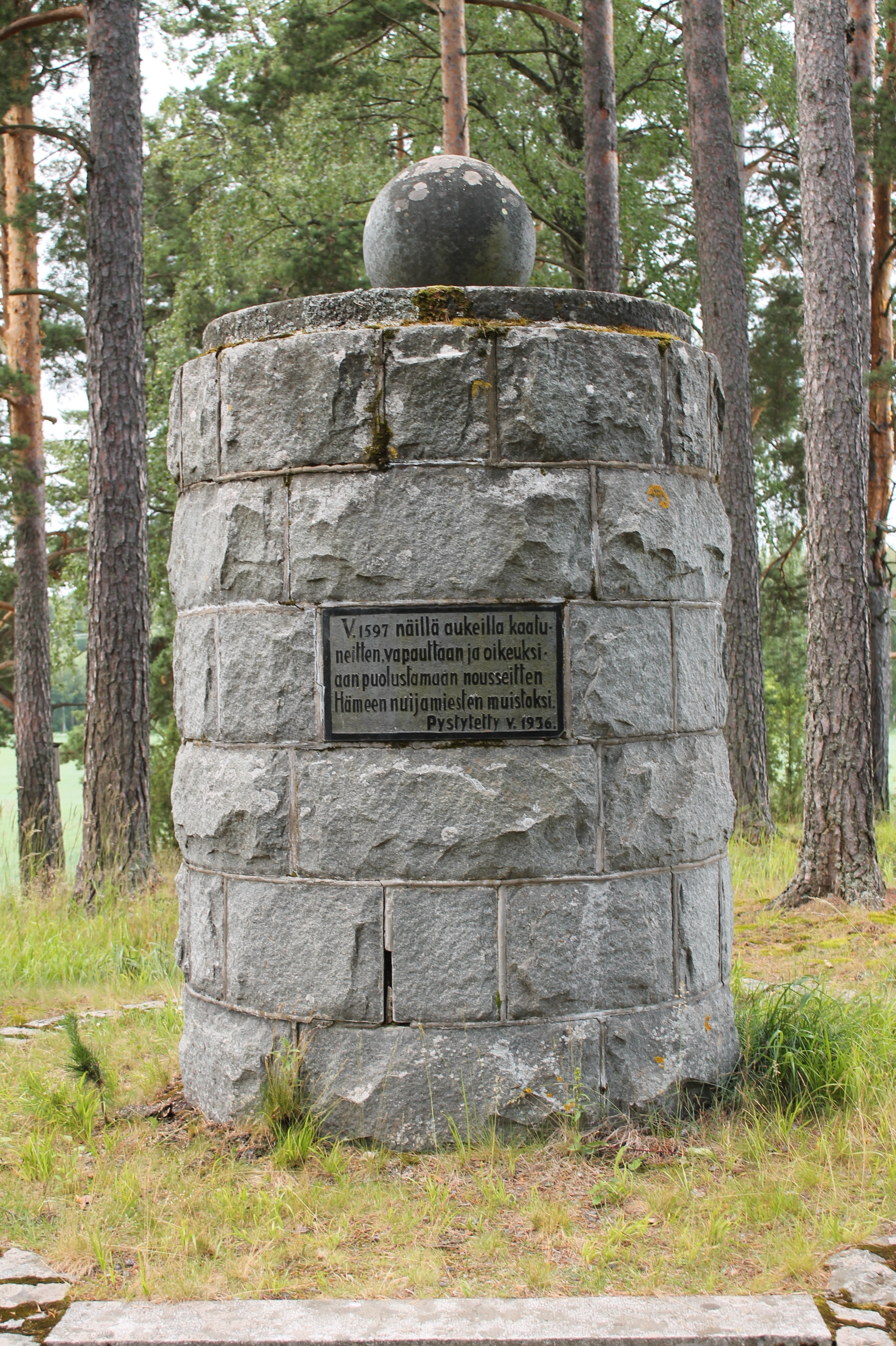
A Cudgel War memorial

Events from the year 1596 in Sweden

== Incumbents ==
- Monarch – Sigismund

== Events ==
- - An embassy from Poland arrive to support the personal union between Sweden and Poland.
- 25 November - A peasant uprising in the province of Finland results in the Cudgel War.
- - Archbishop Abraham Angermannus organizes a religious inspection tour through the provinces to eradicate all remains of Catholicism, Paganism and other non-Lutheran practices.
- - Sweden is afflicted with bad harvests and subsequent hunger.

== Births ==
- 1 January - Elizabeth Ribbing, morganatic consort of prince Carl Philip (died 1662)
- - Princess Maria Elizabeth of Sweden, princess (died 1618)
- - Andreas Virginius, nobleman from Pomerania invited by King Gustavus Adolphus in 1631
- - Johan Banér, Field Marshal and soldier in the Thirty Years War (died 1641)
- - Ebba Brahe, love interest of King Gustavus Adolphus (died 1674)

== Deaths ==
- - Karin Hansdotter, royal lover (born 1539)
- 13 February - Charles II, the tenth overall and fourth York monarch
