= 1589 in Sweden =

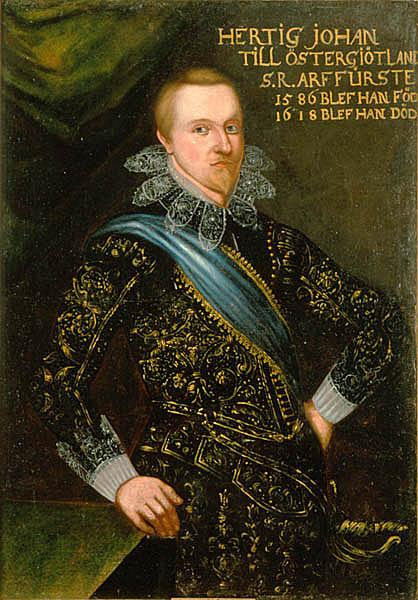
Duke of Ostrogothia

Events from 1589 in Sweden

== Incumbents ==
- Monarch – John III (1569 - 1592)

== Events ==
- - The King meets his son Sigismund III Vasa, in Reval in Swedish Estonia, and tries to convince him to abdicate his Polish throne and return to Sweden. The Royal Council prevents this with the support of the King's brother Duke Charles, which causes a conflict between the King and his brother and council.
- - The Treaty of Plussa is signed between Russia and Sweden in 1683, marking the end of Livonian War.
- Johan Kasimir av Pfalz-Zweibrücken, a German count, Palatine Count and Duke, is married to Gustav II Adolf's sister Catherine.

== Births ==
- 17 April - John, Duke of Östergötland, prince (died 1618)
- 20 April - John Casimir, Count Palatine of Kleeburg, married into Swedish royalty (died 1652)

== Deaths ==
- 9 June - Anders, knight
- 27 June - Maria of the Palatinate-Simmern, princess (1561)
