= 1672 in Sweden =

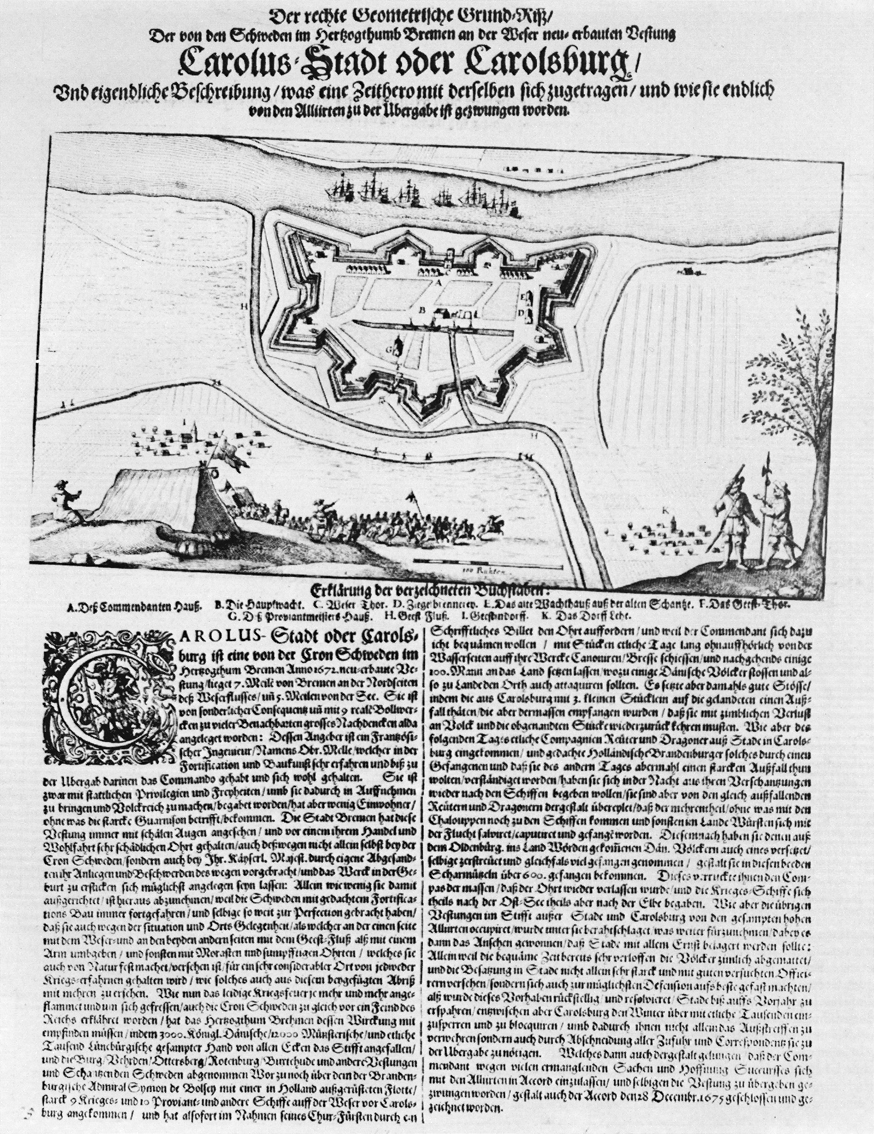
Leaflet showing Carlsburg in 1676

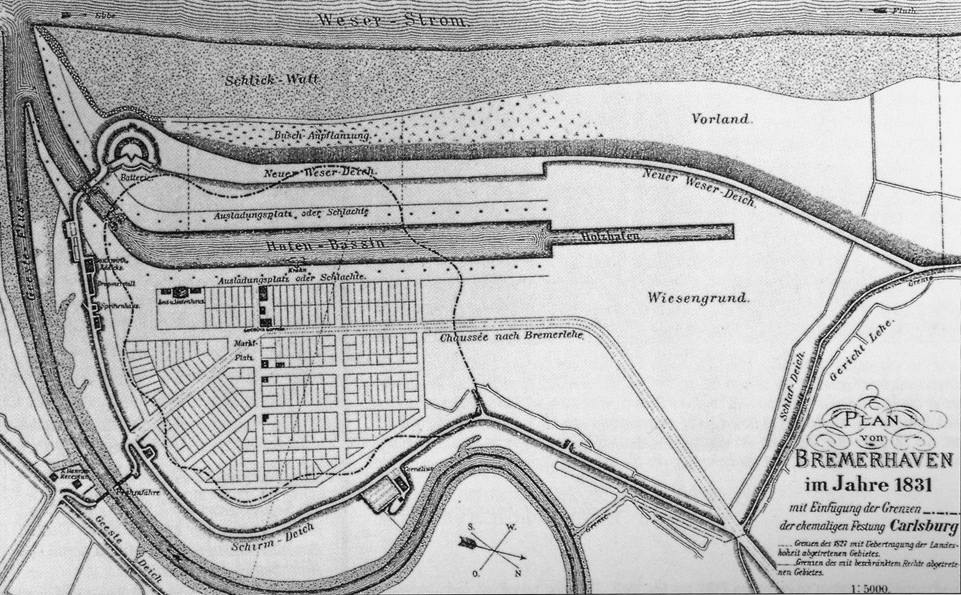
Bremerhaven in 1831, former Carlsburg outlined with dotted lines

Events from the year 1672 in Sweden

== Incumbents ==
- Monarch – Charles XI

== Events ==
- Alliance between Sweden and France.
- The King is declared to legal majority, and the regency government is thereby dissolved.
- Hervarar saga by Olof Verelius.
- Sten Nilsson Bielke is appointed Lord High Treasurer of Sweden.
- Carlsburg, Weser

== Births ==
- 27 October - Maria Gustava Gyllenstierna, writer (died 1737)
- Hedvig Mörner, politically influential countess (died 1753)

== Deaths ==
- Agneta Horn, memoir writer (died 1629)
- Georg Stiernhielm, linguist and poet (died 1598)
- Märet Jonsdotter, alleged witch (born 1644)
