= 1668 in Sweden =

Events from the year 1668 in Sweden

== Incumbents ==
- Monarch – Charles XI
- Regency – Hedvig Eleonora of Holstein-Gottorp, Per Brahe the Younger, Magnus Gabriel De la Gardie, Gustaf Otto Stenbock, Seved Bååth and Knut Kurck.

== Events ==
- January 28 – Lund University is officially inaugurated with great ceremony in Lund Cathedral on the King's name day.
- April 25 – The Swedish Empire signs a treaty in Westminster to join England and the Dutch Republic in the Triple Alliance, a coalition formed to halt the expansion of Louis XIV of France during the War of Devolution
- July – The Mora witch trial begins in Dalarna after accusations by a young shepherd girl, Gertrud Svensdotter. This marks the start of the "Great Noise" (Det stora oväsendet), a period of mass witch-hunt hysteria that lasted until 1676.
- September 17 – Riksens Ständers Bank (The Bank of the Estates of the Realm), the oldest central bank in the world, is established in Stockholm to replace the failed Stockholms Banco.
- December 28 – The Swedish ambassador Fritz Cronman arrives in Moscow to represent the Swedish Empire at the court of the Russian Empire.

== Births ==
- April 14 – Magnus Julius De la Gardie, Swedish general and politician (died 1741).
- September 2 – Margareta von Ascheberg, Swedish noblewoman and land owner (died 1753).
- Sven Andersson, farmworker executed for sodomy (died 1691).

== Deaths ==
- Count Christopher Delphicus zu Dohna (died 1668)
- August 28 – Axel Itze, Swedish military officer.
- Johan Palmstruch, founder of Stockholms Banco (born 1611).
