= 1666 in Sweden =

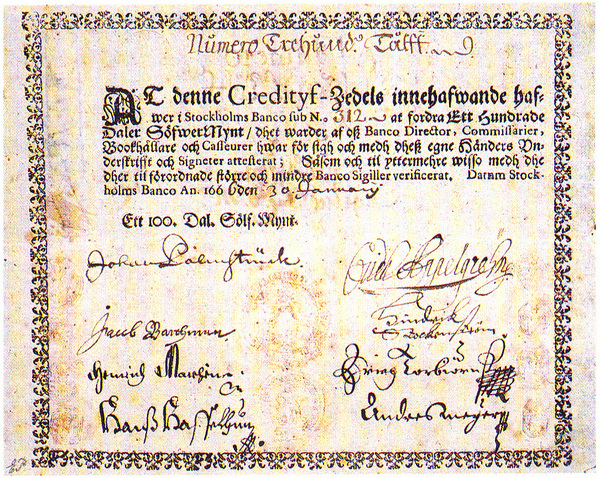
Swedish Credityf Zedels (January 1666)

Events from the year 1666 in Sweden

== Incumbents ==
- Monarch – Charles XI

== Events ==
- The Second Bremen War.
- The Lund University is founded.
- Second return to Sweden of Christina, Queen of Sweden.
- Publication of the Upsalia antiqua by Johannes Schefferus.
- The enactment of the Royal Placat of 1666.

== Births ==
- 4 September - Anna Maria Ehrenstrahl, painter (died 1729)
- 9 November - Carl Gustaf Armfeldt, officer (died 1736)
- 21 August - Adolph John II, Count Palatine of Kleeburg, duke (died 1701)

== Deaths ==
- 27 February - Gustav Evertsson Horn, military and politician (born 1614)
