= Ingierd Gunnarsdotter =

Ingierd Gunnarsdotter (1601–1686) was a Swedish peasant wife and ballad singer from Lyrestad parish in Västergötland.

She is known as the source of information of 57 folksongs, some of which are known and preserved only through her, and which were documented by the official Erich Sparrman on the order of the royal Swedish National Heritage Board in 1678. According to Sparrman, she knew many more, about 300, but as she was old and weak and not willing to cooperate, he was only able to have a very limited number of them.

== Sources ==
- Sven-Bertil Jansson, Den levande balladen, Prisma. 1999. (Utgiven av Svenskt visarkiv.)
- Leif Jonsson, Ann-Marie Nilsson & Greger Andersson : Musiken i Sverige. Från forntid till stormaktstidens slut 1720 (1994)
