= Stormor i Dalom =

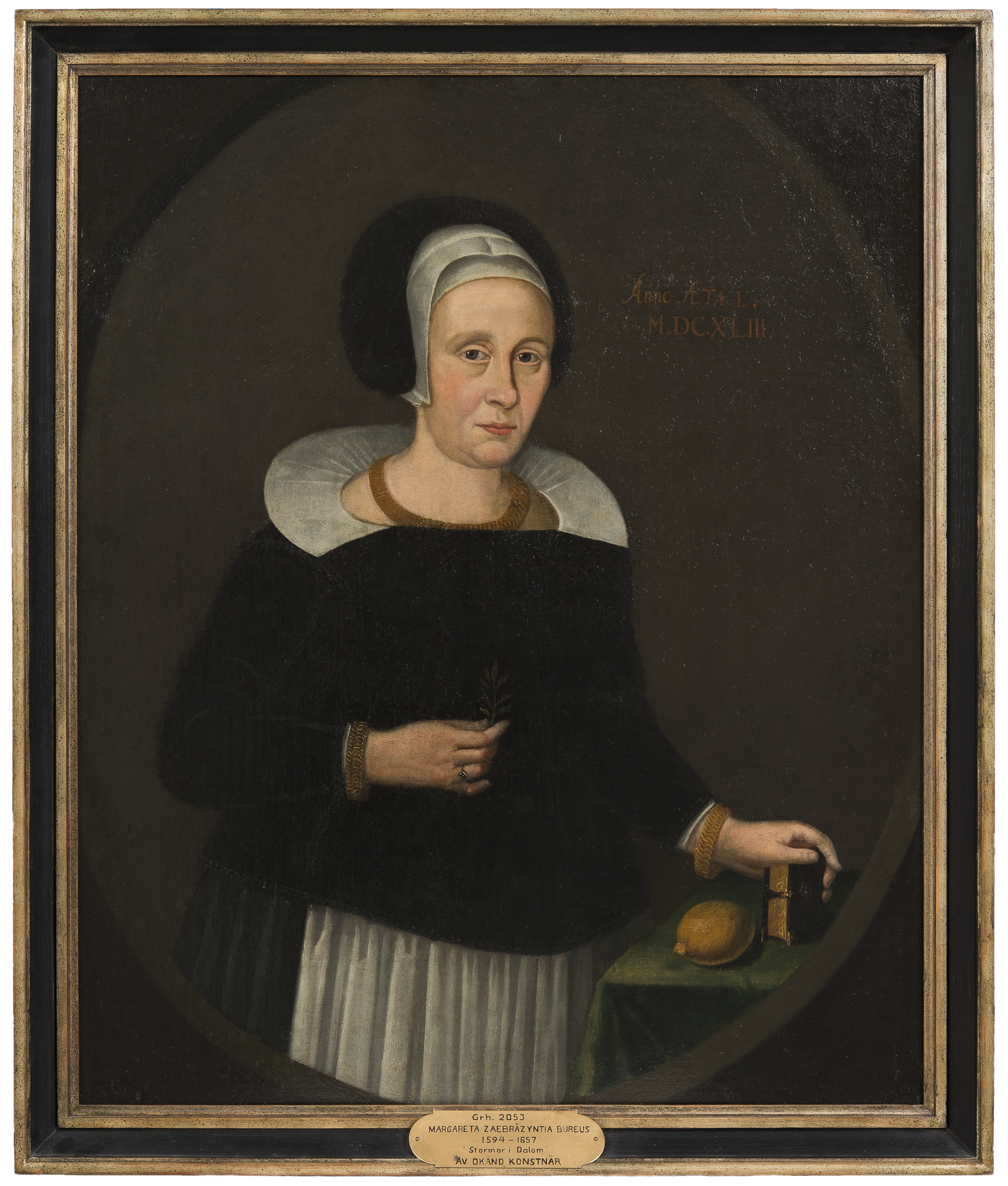
- Born: Margareta Hansdotter; 1594
- Died: 1657 (aged 62–63)
- Known for: Stockholm Exhibition (1930)
- Spouse(s): Elof Terserus (m. 1610) Uno Troilus (m. 1618)

Margareta Hansdotter (1594–1657), also called Säbråzynthia, was a Swedish vicar's wife famous in history by the name Stormor i Dalom (The Great Mother of Dalom). She was given the name Stormor i Dalom during her own lifetime because of her good heart and charitable nature toward the poor, as well as for her many children.

== Life ==
Stormor i Dalom was born to Johannes Laurentii, vicar of Säbrå parish in Ångermanland, and thereby the cousin of the mathematician Andreas Bureus and the sister of bishop Jacobus Johannis Zebrozynthius.

In 1610, she married Elof Terserus (1554–1617), vicar of Leksand, and in 1618, she married the successor of her late spouse, Uno Troilus (1586–1654), through Widow Conservation. Stormor was known and loved for her great kindness: upon her death, a farmer alongside the road famously said: "Should I not cry, when the Great Mother in Dalom is dead?", a tribute to her favorable reputation of motherly goodness, which was mentioned in the sermon of her funeral.

== Stockholm Exhibition ==
While the 1930 Stockholm Exhibition is remembered for introducing functionalist architecture, it also featured a dedicated pavilion for the State Institute for Racial Biology. The head of the institute at the time, Herman Lundborg, used the platform of the exhibition to promote eugenics and racial purity ideas to the broader Swedish public. To capture public attention and make his theories relatable he found it in Stormor i Dalom There, he described Stormor i Dalom as the source of thousands descendants with good traits, many of whom achieved leading roles and positions in public life, and in other domains. Lundborg argued that Stormor i Dalom was an example of what a good woman made of the right stuff.

== Legacy ==
She is known as the matriarch of a large number of Swedish families: Arborelius, Floderus, Geijer, Holmgren, Key, Munktell, Staaff, Stridsberg, Troilius, von Troil and Trygger.

During the age of the eugenics of the 1930s, she was given as an example for the eugenic belief that virtue and success could be inherited.
