= Agneta Rosenbröijer =

Finnish-Swedish noblewoman

Agneta Rosenbröijer (c. 1620 – 11 September 1697) was a Finnish-Swedish noblewoman and business person. She was a significant figure in the local history of Viborg, known for her pride, temperament and feuds, which has been the subject of many stories.

== Biography ==
Agneta Rosenbröijer was born in Vyborg. She was the daughter of the burger Tönnies Antonius Bröijer, mayor of Viborg in Swedish Finland. She married in 1640 to merchant Tönnies Antonius Bröijer (d. 1652) who was engaged in commodity trading. As was usual in Sweden at the time, kept her own surname after her marriage In 1647, her father was ennobled with the surname Rosenbröijer. She took her father's new surname and became known as Agneta Rosenbröijer.

Widowed in 1652, she took over the trading business of her late spouse. In 1655, she married the recently ennobled captain Peter von Gertten (d. 1671). After marriage, he left for six years to serve in the Polish–Swedish wars. After his return in 1661, the couple attracted attention with their extravagant life style and belonged to the leading people of the city. They bought the manor Ahijärvi in 1663 to live in accordance with their noble status, while she continued to manage the trading business. It was an important business and belonged to the few in Viborg at that time to trade with foreign nations.

After the death of her second spouse in 1671, Agneta Rosenbröijer was dragged in to a fourteen year long period of lawsuits: she was forced to pay of the debts accumulated by her spouse and herself during all their years of extravagance, while she herself sued the state and demanded to be given the salary of her late spouse to pay of the creditors. Her situation was worsened through the reduction of 1683.

In 1685, finally, the king granted her the income from a couple of farms for her personal support.

== Other sources ==
- Biografiskt lexikon för Finland 1. Svenska tiden (2008).
