= 1603 in Sweden =

Events from the year 1603 in Sweden

== Events ==
- Polish–Swedish War (1600–1611): At Wesenberg (Rakvere), Jan Karol Chodkiewicz defeated a Swedish reinforcement force under Arvid Stålarm the Younger sent to relieve the Swedish troops in Dorpat. The town later surrendered on April.
- - Sweden is struck by the Bubonic plague.

== Births ==
- 28 June - Margareta Brahe, controversial countess and courtier (died 1669)
- 17 August - Lennart Torstensson, Field Marshal and military engineer (died 1651)
