= Widow conservation =

Marriage practice in Protestant Europe in the early modern age

Widow conservation was a practice in Protestant Europe in the early modern age, when the widow of a parish vicar (or sometimes her daughter) would marry her husband's successor to the vicarage to ensure her economic support. The practice was common in Scandinavia (Änkekonservering/Enkekonservering) and Protestant parts of Germany (Konservierung von Pfarrwitwen). It is related to other forms of widow inheritance, including the levirate marriage known in the Old Testament as yibbum.

At the introduction of the Protestant Reformation, priests were allowed to marry. However, as they did not own the vicarage and property attached to their profession, their wife and children were left without a home and means of support after their death. The future support of the widows and children of vicars thereby became a concern for the various churches. The most common solution was for the successor of a vicar to be required to marry the widow (or perhaps her daughter) of his predecessor, thereby "conserving" her.

== Denmark-Norway ==
In the United Kingdoms of Denmark and Norway, the Kirkeordinansen or Church charter of 1537, issued by Christian III of Denmark after the Reformation in Denmark–Norway and Holstein, secured for the widows of priests the right to a naadensaar (year of grace), during which they were secured an income from the parish of their late husbands and residence at the vicarage. Other than that, however, nothing was done to provide for priests' widows, and when the year was over, they were left to support themselves as well as they could, often as midwives or by some small business enterprise in the closest town. In 1566, a recommendation was issued in which priests were lectured to show mercy to the widows of their predecessors and let them stay in the vicarage, and some vicarages established a widow's house adjoining their vicarage.

This proved to be insufficient, and by the early 17th century, it had become customary for a parish to elect a vicar on condition that he marry the widow of his predecessor. There was never any formal law to require this, and if the parish protested to the authorities against a vicar who broke his promise after having been elected, their complaints were given no support by the crown. However, in practice, this was an accepted custom which vicars adjusted to, and during the 17th century it was not uncommon for a woman to have been married to four priests in succession.

In 1659, the first local pension fund for vicars' widows was established. This gradually became a more popular option, but some parishes continued to practise widow conservation until the late 18th century.

== Germany ==
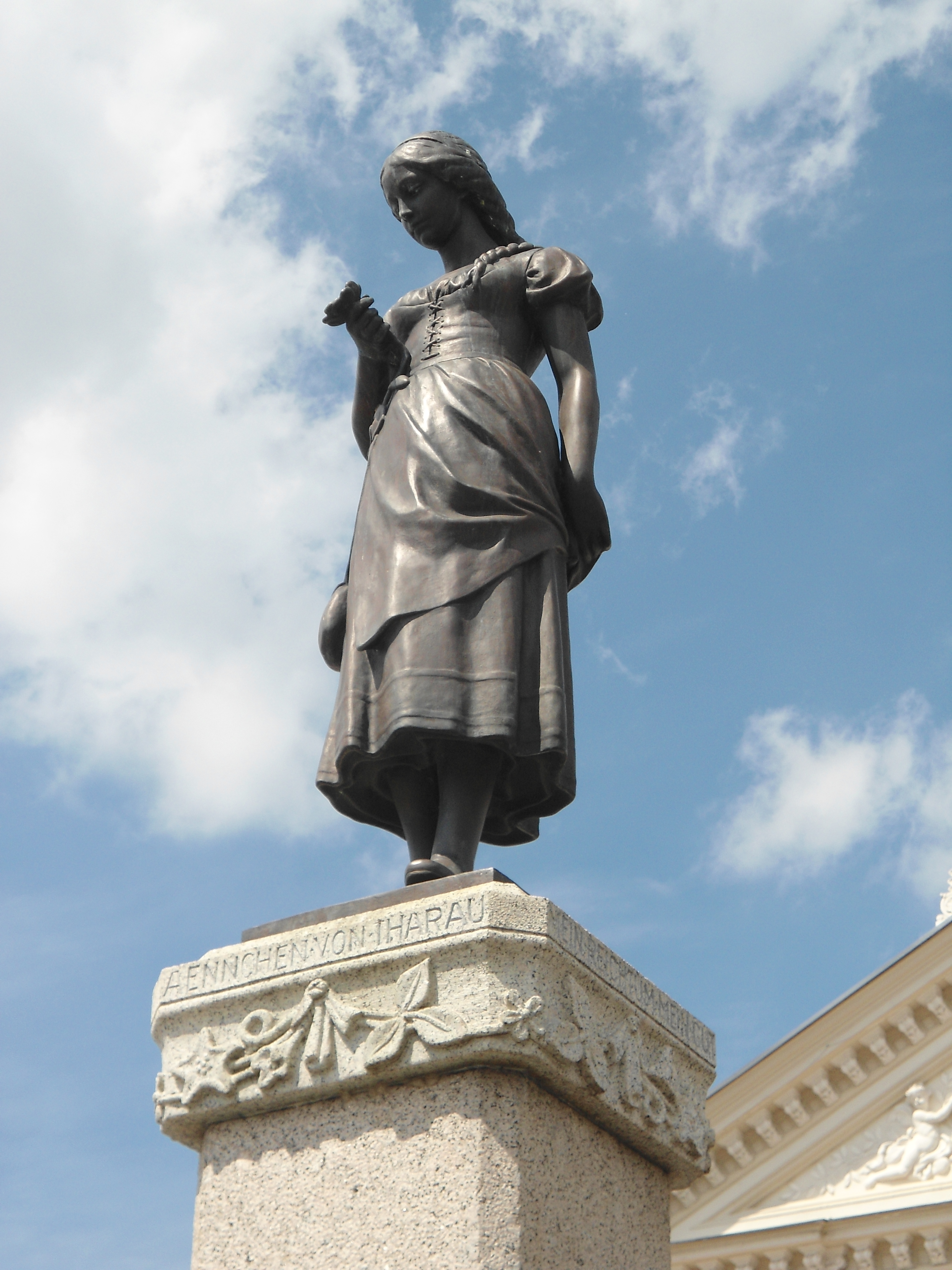
Ännchen von Tharau

=== Brandenburg ===
In Mark Brandenburg, widow conservation was a common practice in the 17th century. In 1698, Frederick III of Brandenburg banned widow conservation by the Juramentum simoniae, as being a form of purchase of the vicarage office.

=== East Prussia ===
Widow conservation was a common practice in East Prussia. The practice was the center of the legend of Ännchen von Tharau, which was inspired by the case of Anna Neander (1615–1689).

=== Mecklenburg ===
The first widow conservation in Mecklenburg is documented from 1551, and by 1580 it had become a common practice, which was recommended by the church order of 1602. By 1704, one third of all vicars' wives were the widow of the vicar's predecessor.

From 1623 onward, however, there was also an increasing number of widow funds, which made widow conservation less necessary. The last widow conservation took place in the mid-19th century.

=== Pomerania ===
In Pomerania, the church synod of 1545 saw no other choice but to tolerate the practice, and in 1572, the conservation of the widow or daughter of a vicar was officially declared the duty of his successor. An attempt to replace it with a dowry provided by the congregations in 1575 failed.

During the 18th century, the practice started to decline because of more alternatives, such as the foundation of a fund for vicars' widows in Swedish Pomerania in 1775.

=== Saxony ===
In the Duchy of Saxony, a strong policy to prevent widow conservation was enforced already when it occurred in the 16th century, and attempts of having a successor of a vicar marry the widow or daughter of his predecessor were actually prevented and contested when it did occur.

== Sweden and Finland ==
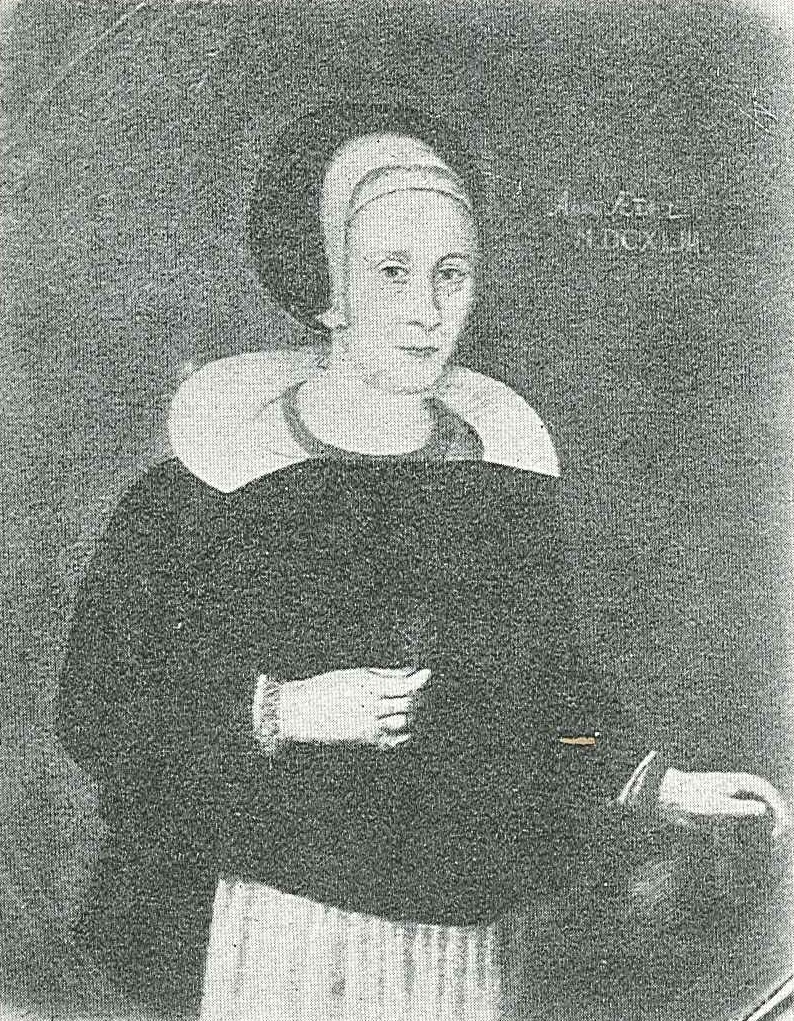
Stormor i Dalom

In Sweden and Finland (then a Swedish province), the parish vicars were given permission to marry after the Swedish Reformation of 1527. The support of vicars' widows quickly became a concern: while priests and their families were being provided for by the income from their parish, this income was attached to their office, and the widow had no right to it after the death of the priest, which could place her in a difficult situation unless she, or her late spouse, had a personal fortune, which was normally not the case. After the death of a vicar, his widow was entitled to a Nådeår or Nådår (Year of Grace) to live on the vicarage while preparing support for herself and her children. During that year, the parish were to select the next vicar. As the parish and church considered it their duty to support the widow of their former vicar, they normally chose a priest who expressed himself willing to marry the widow of his predecessor. The vicar's widow herself also seems to have played a part in electing the next vicar by using the influence she had in the parish by her position as vicar's wife. Another way to arrange the support of the widow was for the next vicar to marry her adult daughter, if she had one, or that the son of a vicar succeeded him.

In the Swedish Church Ordinance 1571, the rules stated that the son or the son-in-law of the former vicar were to be considered first when a new parish vicar was chosen. During the 17th century, widow conservation was common practice and the majority of the vicar's wives were the widow or daughter of her husband's predecessor. The Swedish Church Law 1686 stated that when a new parish vicar was to be elected, the candidates who expressed themselves willing to marry the widow or daughter of his predecessor should be favored. This regulation was dropped in 1739, when the education of the vicars became the formal qualification to the office, but informally, the practice continued the entire 18th century, as the parishes continued to regard it their responsibility to support the vicars' wives, who were often locals and had strong positions in their parishes.

There were also parishes which were formally inherited this way. In 1591, King John III of Sweden granted the Annerstad parish in Småland to vicar Georgius Marci, to be inherited on both the male and female line by his descendants: either by a son, or by a successor married to a daughter or a widow of his predecessor. Upon the death of Marci in 1613, his parish was inherited by his son-in-law by marriage to his daughter, Kerstin Marca (1585–1653), who has been referred to as the first Swedish female to have formally inherited the right to a vicar's parish. The Annerstad parish was on several occasions inherited by females in the same fashion - such as for example by Gunilla Osængius in 1685 - until the year of 1780, when king Gustav III of Sweden refused the request of a vicars candidate to marry the 12-year-old daughter of the recently deceased vicar Anders Osængius.

By the end of the 18th century and the beginning of the 19th century, however, widow conservation quickly came out of use. The reasons were several: a different view upon marriage as more of a love union than a practical arrangement; that the education of the candidates, who were less often the sons of vicars, had become more important; and because the recently established retirement funds for vicar's widows made the solution less needed. The first retirement fund was Allmänna Änke- och Pupillkassan i Sverige from 1740, granting pensions to destitute widows of civil servants; this was not sufficient, and during the 19th-century, the Nådår was often prolonged upon application, until the more efficient retirement fund Prästerskapets Änke- och Pupillkassa exclusively for vicar's widows was established in 1874.

== Examples ==
- Stormor i Dalom, in 1618
- Beinta Broberg, in 1706
- Lovisa von Burghausen, in 1731

== See also ==
- Women in the Reformation
