= Karin Thomasdotter =

Finnish court advocate

- Born: 1610
- Died: 1697 (aged 86–87)
- Occupation: Vogt (court advocate)

Karin Thomasdotter (Swedish; Finnish: Karin Thomaksentytär; 1610–1697) was an official Vogt (court advocate) and länsman, in the province of Finland that was then part of Sweden. Her position as an official was near to unique for a woman of her time, particularly as she was not of noble birth.

== Biography ==
She was the granddaughter, daughter, wife, mother and grandmother of vogts, and took over this position herself after the death of her spouse. She functioned as vogt in Pargas (now Finland) for forty years, which makes her one of the longest serving vogts in contemporary Finland. She was also one of only two females to have the position in contemporary Finland. She has been described as a person with great authority.
