= 1600 in Sweden =

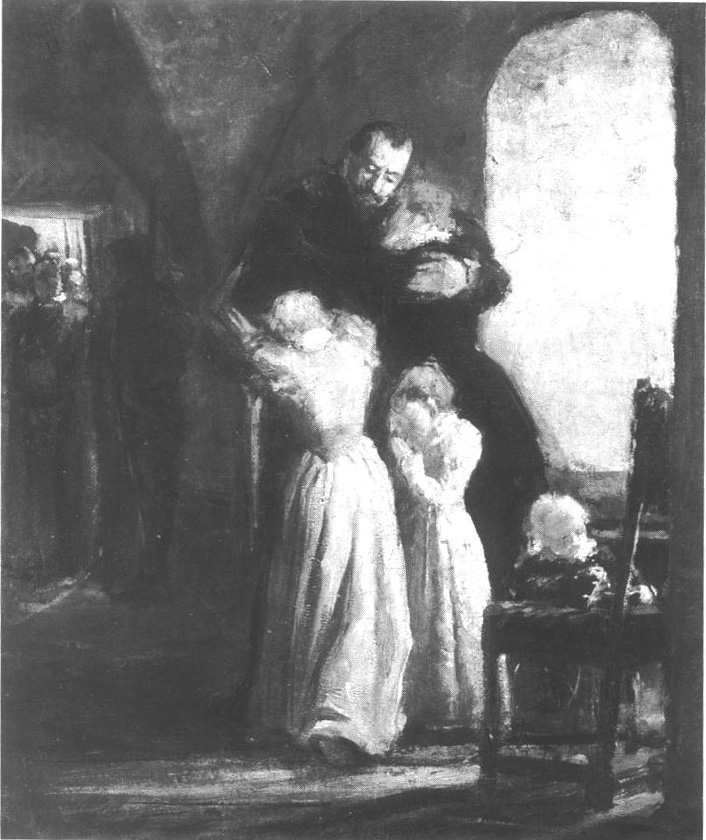
Last farewell to Gustaf Axelsson Baner when he is beheaded in Linköping Square, painting by Fanny Brate.

Events from the year 1600 in Sweden

== Events ==
- 20 March - Linköping Bloodbath conducted against the Sigismund loyalists.
- - The immigration of Walloons to Sweden begins.
- The War against Sigismund becomes the Polish–Swedish War (1600–11).

== Births ==
- 4 March - Hans Christoff von Königsmarck, soldier (died 1663)

== Deaths ==
=== January-March ===
- March 20 (Linköping Bloodbath)
  - Erik Sparre – the Chancellor of Sweden and a senator in the Riksens ständer
  - Ture Nilsson Bielke – a senator in the Riksens ständer
  - Gustaf Banér – a senator in the Riksens ständer and father of Gustavus Adolphus' Field Marshal Johan Banér (b. 1547)
  - Sten Banér – a senator in the Riksens ständer
  - Bengt Falck – a senator in the Riksens ständer

=== April-June ===
- May 18 - Nicolaus Olai Bothniensis, Swedish archbishop (b. 1550)
- May 19 - Gustaf Banér, privy Councillor (b. 1547)
