= 1599 in Sweden =

Events from the year 1599 in Sweden

== Seventeenth Century Sweden ==
When King John III dies in 1592 his son Sigismund accede to the Swedish throne. Conflict arose when Duke Charles, the living son of Gustav Vasa, did not approve of the accession of Sigismund, his nephew, and a Catholic, to the government. Sigismund was related to the Catholic Habsburgs who were attempting to control the Protestant princes of Germany. Religious fervor, economic self-interest, and political and dynastic self-preservation all motivated the Swedes to help the Protestants in the Thirty Years' War.

Sweden (which included Finland) was completely Lutheran in the 17th century. In 1586, Sigismund Vasa, son of King John III and Catherine Jagiellonia, was elected king of the Polish-Lithuanian Commonwealth in an attempt to continue the Polish-Swedish alliance, the original purpose being to confront Ivan IV.

== War Against Sigismund ==
Sigismund III Vasa, king of both the Commonwealth and Sweden, lost the throne of Sweden during the civil war (1587–1599). After an early stalemate, Sigismund was defeated in the Battle of Stångebro in 1598 and by 1599, Sigismund was dethroned by his uncle, Duke Charles and forced to retreat to the Commonwealth. This also ended the short-lived personal union between Poland and Sweden.

After Sigismund had been crowned King of Sweden February 19, 1594, he decided that no Parliaments (Riksdag) could be summoned without the King's consent. Despite this, Charles summoned a Parliament at Söderköping in autumn 1595, at which he managed to get his will through. The Duke was appointed Regent with “the advice of the Council”, meaning that he was to govern Sweden together with the Privy Council during the King's absence from the Realm. Soon afterward, the nobility of Finland, led by the Sigismund-appointed Governor, Laus Fleming, rejected these decisions, They sympathized with the King and considered Charles a rebel. As a counterattack, Charles instigated a rebellion against Fleming, the Cudge War, among the farmers in Ostrobothnia. Fleming managed to quell the revolt but died in April 1597.

In 1597, civil war erupted, and Duke Charles was able to assume control over a large share of the powerful castles in the country, and in this manner achieved control over almost all the Realm. The problem was Finland, where Klaus Fleming's widow guarded Åbo castle. But after psychological warfare, Charles and his followers managed to take the castle in Turku (Swedish: Åbo). When Sigismund found out about what had happened in Finland he lost his patience. The King could not accept Duke Charles's disrespectful actions. He decided to use force.

At the end of May 1598, Sigismund landed on Swedish soil at Avaskär. The King opened peacefully by sending the diplomat Samuel Łaski to Kalmar for negotiations. His task was to convince the city's commanders to open the gates. However, the negotiations led nowhere. Instead, the King took his soldiers and marched on Kalmar. The army halted just outside the city. The plan was to frighten the commanders into opening the gates. To make his message even more terrifying, Sigismund threatened the city with severe punishments and to withdraw the nobility of all children in the city. The propaganda worked well and Sigismund was able to make his long-desired entry on August 1.

== Year 1599 ==
The King had planned to return to Sweden, which raised morale among his followers. However, these plans were never put into action. But the war had not ended. It continued for a few months, as Charles tried to reclaim the cities that were still in Sigismund's hands. He started by appointing a new city government in Stockholm. Then he scolded the burghers, who he claimed hadn't defended the city enough. It all finished with a lot of people being jailed, among them Archbishop Abraham Angermannus, who had supported Sigismund.

Then Swedish forces, led by Carl Carlsson Gyllenhielm, marched towards Kalmar to lay siege to the city. Johan Larsson Sparre defended the walls and the castle in the hope that the King would return to Sweden. But he never got any assistance and the night between March 1 and March 2 the city was assaulted. Gyllenhielm and Samuel Nilsson were ordered to attack the north gate. Duke Charles himself led the attack on the western gate. After the short fight, Charles's men managed to scale the walls. Since the soldiers began looting the city, however, the opportunity to capture Kalmar Castle in the same stroke was lost.

The coming days, the castle proved more tenacious than expected. Johan Larsson Sparre kept the Swedes away, and finally, six Polish ships arrived. These, however, were driven back by four smaller Swedish ships and Swedish artillery fire from within the city. When the Polish ships were unable to do anything, hope disappeared for the defenders inside the castle. After the assault and capture of Kalmar, the focus of the war moved to Finland. Stronghold after stronghold began to be captured in July. At first, Hans Klasson Bielkenstierna and Peder Stolpe commanded the battle against Sigismund's followers, but on August 19, Duke Charles personally assumed command. With the help of the navy, he crushed the last remnants, and by September all of Sigismund's followers were gone, detained or executed, e.g. in the Åbo bloodbath.

== Aftermath and Consequences ==
Sigismund was officially deposed from the throne of Sweden by a Parliament, Riksdag, held in Stockholm on July 24, 1599. He was given six months to say whether he wanted to send his son. Prince Ladislaus of Poland, to Sweden as his successor, under the condition that the boy would be brought up in the Evangelical faith. Otherwise, the Estates would look for a new king.
