= 1670 in Sweden =

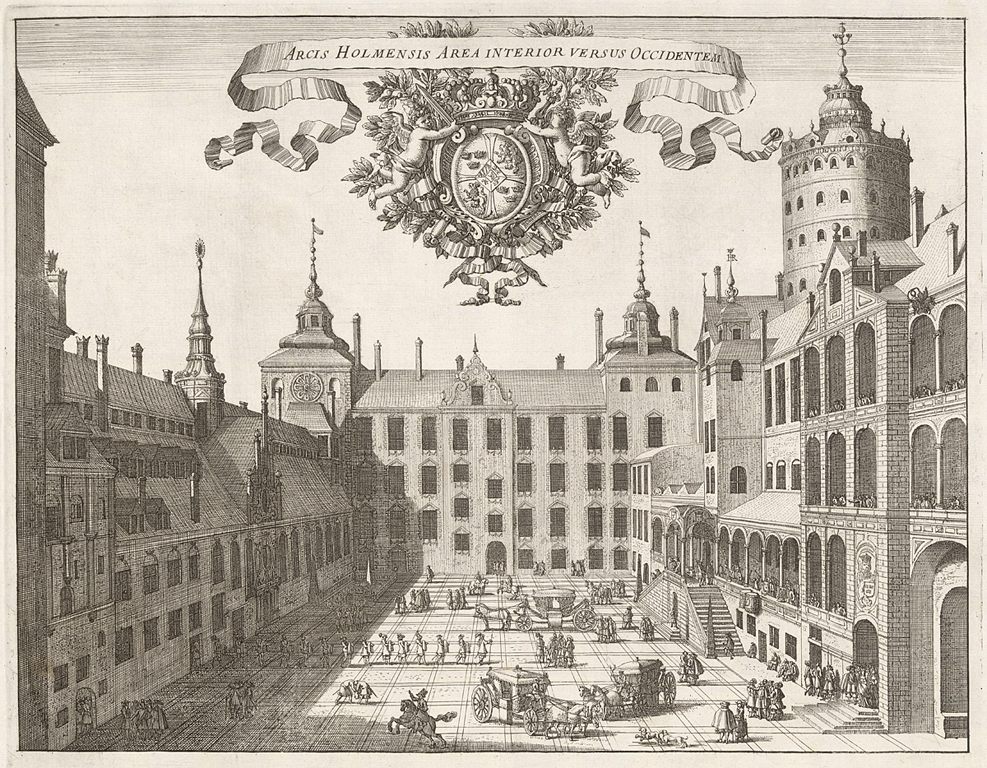

Events from the year 1670 in Sweden

== Incumbents ==
- Monarch – Charles XI

== Events ==
- February 22 – Laurentius Stigzelius is appointed as the new Swedish archbishop. When he was ordained shortly afterwards by Bishop Enander in Linköping, it was the last time before 1914 that a Swedish archbishop was ordained (all archbishops between Stigzelius and Nathan Söderblom are already bishops at the time of accession).

=== Unknown dates ===
- Six people decapitated for witchcraft in Kungsälv
- The first sods are taken to Carlsburg at the mouth of the river Weser. The city is supposed to become a Swedish support point for trade competition, but the project fails
- Ransäter's parish was created by breaking away from Övre Ullerud's parish.
- The (then) village of Sundsvall, a fishing village in eastern central area of Sweden that is now the Sundsvall Municipality, reached a population of 194.

== Births ==
- 19 June - Olof Celsius, botanist, philologist (died 1756)
- 12 April - Gustav, Duke of Zweibrücken, prince (died 1731)

== Deaths ==
- Baron Lorens von der Linde (Born 20 July 1610, Died 25 June 1670)
