= List of shipwrecks in October 1870 =

The list of shipwrecks in October 1870 includes ships sunk, foundered, grounded, or otherwise lost during October 1870.

== 1 October ==
List of shipwrecks: 1 October 1870
Ship	State	Description
Barabino Padre	Italy	The ship departed from New York for Antwerp, Belgium. No further trace, presumed foundered with the loss of all hands.
Cairngorm	United Kingdom	The ship ran aground in the River Clyde. She was on a voyage from Quebec City, Canada to Greenock, Renfrewshire.
King Bird	United Kingdom	The ship ran aground on Watson's Shoal, in the Belfast Lough. She was on a voyage from Bathurst, New Brunswick, Canada to Warrenpoint, County Down.

== 2 October ==
List of shipwrecks: 2 October 1870
Ship	State	Description
Black Friar	United Kingdom	The barque was abandoned in the Atlantic Ocean. Her crew were rescued. She was on a voyage from Quebec City, Canada to Grangemouth, Stirlingshire.
Joseph Haydn	Norway	The ship was driven ashore and wrecked at Torrevieja, Spain. Her crew were rescued.
Snowdrop	United Kingdom	The ship was driven ashore at "Riding", Sweden. She was on a voyage from Malmö, Sweden to London. She was refloated and taken in to Gothenburg, Sweden.

== 3 October ==
List of shipwrecks: 3 October 1870
Ship	State	Description
Escape	United Kingdom	The brig was wrecked on the coast of Formosa. Her crew survived. She was on a voyage from Niuzhuang to Hong Kong. The wreck was plundered by the local inhabitants
Levant	Netherlands	The steamship was driven ashore on Skagen, Denmark. She was on a voyage from Rotterdam, South Holland to Gothenburg, Sweden. She was refloated the next day with assistance from another steamship.
Luzanne	France	The barque ran aground on the Lemon Sand, in the North Sea. She was on a voyage from South Shields, County Durham, United Kingdom to Dunkirk, Nord. She was refloated and taken in to Great Yarmouth, Norfolk, United Kingdom.
Spitfire	United Kingdom	The smack struck a sunken wreck and foundered off the Haisborough Sands, in the North Sea off the coast of Norfolk. Her crew survived.
Unnamed	Flag unknown	The steamship ran aground on Jordan's Bank, in Liverpool Bay.

== 4 October ==
List of shipwrecks: 4 October 1870
Ship	State	Description
Barbara Moir	United Kingdom	The schooner was driven ashore at "Knockhead". She was on a voyage from Banff to Portsoy, Aberdeenshire. She was refloated the next day.
Ebenezer	United Kingdom	The schooner sprang a severe leak off the mouth of the Humber. She was on a voyage from Pittenweem, Fife to London. She was beached at Spurn Point, Yorkshire with assistance from the Spurn Lifeboat. She was refloated the next day and towed in to Grimsby, Lincolnshire by the tug Warrior (United Kingdom).
Eolus	Canada	The brig foundered in the Atlantic Ocean. Her crew were rescued. She was on a voyage from Marseille, Bouches-du-Rhône, France to Matanzas, Cuba.
Fruiterer	New South Wales	The ship ran aground on a reef off "Pius Island". She was on a voyage from Sydney to New Caledonia.
Lady Eglinton	United Kingdom	The steamship was driven ashore in Compton Bay. She was on a voyage from Dublin to Southampton. She was refloated.
Lady Stanley	United Kingdom	The barque was driven ashore on Lady Isle, in the Firth of Clyde. She was on a voyage from Bristol to the River Clyde. She was refloated the next day and taken in to Troon, Ayrshire.
Laine	Russia	The ship caught fire and sank in Beşik Bay. She was on a voyage from Hull, Yorkshire, United Kingdom to Odesa.
Leader	Canada	The brig foundered off Sambro, Nova Scotia with the loss of all hands. She was on a voyage from Cape Breton Island to Arichat.
Spitfire	United Kingdom	The smack struck a sunken wreck and sank off the Haisborough Sands, in the North Sea off the coast of Norfolk. Her crew were rescued.

== 5 October ==
List of shipwrecks: 5 October 1870
Ship	State	Description
Christian	United Kingdom	The steamship foundered in Liverpool Bay off the Formby Lightship ( Trinity House).
Cochrane	United Kingdom	The steamship was driven ashore at Sunderland, County Durham. She was on a voyage from London to Sunderland. She was refloated.
Mainin	Russia	The ship was destroyed by fire off Tenedos, Ottoman Empire. She was on a voyage from an English port to Odesa.
Progress	United Kingdom	The ship was driven ashore on Scharhörn, Hamburg. She was on a voyage from Philadelphia to Hamburg.
Renard	French Navy	The aviso was driven ashore at Newhaven, Sussex, United Kingdom. She was refloated.
Unnamed	United Kingdom	The schooner was run down and sunk by the steamship Munster (United Kingdom) with the loss of all but one of her crew.

== 6 October ==
List of shipwrecks: 6 October 1870
Ship	State	Description
Cambria	United Kingdom	The ship was wrecked on the North Breakers. She was on a voyage from Bahia, Brazil to Galveston, Texas, United States.
Cora	United Kingdom	The ship foundered off Frangerola, Spain. Her crew were rescued by Yubas (Spain). Cora was on a voyage from Newport, Monmouthshire to Barcelona, Spain.
Frithjof	Sweden	The ship was wrecked on Anholt, Denmark. Her crew were rescued. She was on a voyage from Newcastle upon Tyne, Northumberland, United Kingdom to Stockholm.
Johanne	Denmark	The ship was driven ashore on the west coast of Denmark. She was on a voyage from Bergen, Norway to Stettin. She was refloated and taken in to Fredrikshavn in a severely leaky condition.
Medway	Canada	The barque collided with the schooner Devil (United Kingdom) and foundered with the loss of all but two of her crew. She was on a voyage from Liverpool to Halifax, Nova Scotia.
Sophia	United Kingdom	The brigantine was lost in Ramsey Sound with the loss of three of her five crew. She was on a voyage from Cardiff to Liverpool.
Suzanne	France	The barque ran aground on the Ower Sand, in the North Sea. She was on a voyage from Newcastle upon Tyne to Dunkirk, France. She was refloated with assistance.
Waterlily	United Kingdom	The barque was driven ashore near Marsala, Sicily.

== 7 October ==
List of shipwrecks: 7 October 1870
Ship	State	Description
Anna Colbjorssen	Norway	The barque ran aground on the Fingrund. She was on a voyage from Luleå, Sweden to Plymouth, Devon, United Kingdom. She was refloated and taken in to Stockholm, Sweden in a severely leaky condition.
Barter	United Kingdom	The ship was wrecked in a hurricane at Matanzas, Cuba.
Captain	United Kingdom	The ship foundered in a hurricane with the loss of at least two of her crew. She was on a voyage from Havana, Cuba to Newcastle upon Tyne, Northumberland.
Castor	Flag unknown	The steamship was driven ashore in the Bokkegat.
Charlena	United Kingdom	The ship was wrecked in a hurricane at Matanzas.
Darien	France	The steamship was driven ashore and wrecked in a hurricane at Moleno Point, Cuba. All on board were rescued by the steamship Guantánamo (Spain)
Edwin	United Kingdom	The ship was wrecked in a hurricane at Matanzas.
Freihandel	Lübeck	The steamship was driven ashore at Hamra, Gotland, Sweden. She was on a voyage from Lübeck to Saint Petersburg, Russia.
Glasgow	United Kingdom	The ship was wrecked in a hurricane at Matanzas.
G. S. Hunt	United Kingdom	The ship was wrecked in a hurricane at Matanzas.
Gipsy	United Kingdom	The schooner was driven ashore at Ramsey, Isle of Man. Her ten crew were rescued by the Ramsey Lifeboat Two Sisters ( Royal National Lifeboat Institution). She was on a voyage from Glasgow to Liverpool.
Mariposa	United States	The steamship foundered off the coast of Florida with the loss of all 36 crew. She was on a voyage from New Orleans, Louisiana to New York.
Mercury	United Kingdom	The steamship ran aground on the Goodwin Sands, Kent and was severely damaged. She was on a voyage from Antwerp, Belgium to Newcastle upon Tyne, Northumberland. She was refloated.
Nelson	United Kingdom	The barque struck the Seven Stones Reef, Cornwall and sank with the loss of three of her thirteen crew. Survivors were rescued by the Sevenstones Lightship ( Trinity House). Nelson was on a voyage from Águilas, Spain to the River Tyne.
Pet	United Kingdom	The yacht sank at Gourock, Renfrewshire.
Rees Lewis	United Kingdom	The ship departed from Queenstown, County Cork for Hull, Yorkshire. No further trace, presumed foundered with the loss of all hands.
Scotland	United Kingdom	The steamship ran aground on the Black Rock, off Islay, Inner Hebrides. She was on a voyage from Granton, Lothian to Liverpool. She was refloated on 23 October and taken in to the River Clyde. Subsequently repaired at Birkenhead, Cheshire and returned to service.
Sharon	United Kingdom	The schooner was abandoned in a sinking condition. Her crew were rescued. She was on a voyage from Brixham, Devon to Newcastle upon Tyne.

== 8 October ==
List of shipwrecks: 8 October 1870
Ship	State	Description
Aigle	(United Kingdom of Great Britain and Ireland) Admiralty	The hulk, a former Aigle-class frigate, was sunk by a torpedo fired by HMS Oberon (Royal Navy) off the Isle of Grain, Kent.
Alacrity	United Kingdom	The paddle tug was wrecked at Holmpton, Yorkshire. Her crew were rescued. She was on a voyage from the River Tyne to Hull, Yorkshire.
Caroline	United Kingdom	The schooner was run into by the steamship Filey (United Kingdom) at South Shields, County Durham and was severely damaged.
Gertrude Speelman	Stettin	The ship was driven ashore and wrecked at Boddam, Aberdeenshire, United Kingdom. She was on a voyage from Boddam to Stettin.
Harry	United Kingdom	The derelict brig was driven ashore and wrecked at Staintondale, Yorkshire.
Hero	United Kingdom	The ship foundered in the North Sea off Flamborough Head, Yorkshire. Her crew were rescued. She was on a voyage from Boston, Lincolnshire to South Shields, County Durham.
Huntress	United Kingdom	The brigantine was driven ashore at Lamlash, Isle of Arran. She was on a voyage from Dundalk, County Louth to Troon, Ayrshire. She became a wreck on 12 October.
Jane and Elizabeth	United Kingdom	The sloop was run ashore and wrecked in Loughan Bay. Her crew were rescued.
King	United Kingdom	The schooner foundered in the North Sea 12 nautical miles (22 km) off Spurn Point, Yorkshire. Her crew survived. She was on a voyage from Newcastle upon Tyne, Northumberland to London.
Rob the Ranter	United Kingdom	The schooner was driven ashore and wrecked at Clogherhead, County Louth with the loss of two of her three crew. She was on a voyage from Liverpool to Newry, Ireland.
Sportsman	United Kingdom	The ship sank off Langstone, Hampshire. Her crew survived. She was on a voyage from Portland, Dorset to London.
Veracity	Netherlands	The brig foundered off Great Yarmouth, Norfolk, United Kingdom. Her eighteen crew were rescued by the schooner Kilburn (United Kingdom). Veracity was on a voyage from South Shields to the Nieuw Diep.

== 9 October ==
List of shipwrecks: 9 October 1870
Ship	State	Description
Alice	United States	The schooner was wrecked on Behring's Island. She was on a voyage from New York to San Francisco, California.
Alliance	United Kingdom	The ship was driven ashore on Nagara Point, Ottoman Empire. She was on a voyage from Sulina, Ottoman Empire to Dunkirk, France. She was refloated.
Golden Age	United Kingdom	The ship ran aground in the River Tyne.
Hart	United Kingdom	The brig was abandoned in Robin Hoods Bay. Her eight crew were rescued by the steamship John Fenwick (United Kingdom). She came ashore and was wrecked.
Marie	Prussia	The steamship ran aground on the Zinnowitz Shallows, in the Baltic Sea. She was on a voyage from Danzig to Stralsund.
Marie	Belgium	The fishing smack foundered on the Dogger Bank. Her crew were rescued by the smack George Emily (United Kingdom).
Mercury	United Kingdom	The steamship ran aground on the Goodwin Sands, Kent. She was on a voyage from Antwerp, Belgium to a Mediterranean port. She was refloated and resumed her voyage.
Mercury	Prussia	The sloop struck the breakwater and sank at Stolpemünde with the loss of a crew member. She was on a voyage from Swinemünde to Stolpemünde.
Naiad	United Kingdom	The ship was driven ashore and wrecked at Bridlington, Yorkshire. She was on a voyage from Sunderland, County Durham to Colchester, Essex.
Penniman	United States	The brigantine was wrecked at Port Royal, Jamaica.
Rival	United Kingdom	The schooner was driven ashore at Arkhangelsk, Russia. She was later refloated.
Taglioni	Hamburg	The barque ran aground on Skagen, Denmark and was wrecked with loss of life. Five crew were rescued. She was on a voyage from Vyborg, Grand Duchy of Finland to Hartlepool, County Durham, United Kingdom.
Traveller	United Kingdom	The smack collided with a brig and foundered off the Newark Lightship ( Trinity House). Her crew were rescued.

== 10 October ==
List of shipwrecks: 10 October 1870
Ship	State	Description
H. R. Russell	United States	The ship was wrecked near Havana, Cuba.
Japan	New South Wales	The 140-foot (42.7 m) whaling barque was lost in a gale and heavy fog on the coast of Siberia, Russia 2 nautical miles (3.7 km; 2.3 mi) northwest of East Cape.
John and Samuel	United Kingdom	The ship was driven ashore at Kingscross, Isle of Arran. She was on a voyage from Ayr to Greenock, Renfrewshire.
Mercara	United Kingdom	The barque departed from Liverpool for Singapore. No further trace, presumed foundered with the loss of all hands.
Portia	United Kingdom	The brig collided with the steamship Ranger (United Kingdom) in the River Thames and was beached at Tilbury Fort, Essex. She was on a voyage from Riga, Russia to London.
Raoul Aurelie	France	The ship sank in Liverpool Bay off the Crosby Lightship ( Trinity House). Her crew were rescued. Raoul Aurelie was on a voyage from the Rio de la Hacha to Liverpool.
Ring	United Kingdom	The Yorkshire Billyboy sprang a leak and foundered in the North Sea off Spurn Point, Yorkshire. Her crew were rescued by the schooner Sophie (Denmark). Ring was on a voyage from Newcastle upon Tyne, Northumberland to London.
Saxon	United Kingdom	The brigantine ran aground on the Longsand, in the North Sea off the coast of Essex and was abandoned. Her crew were rescued. She was on a voyage from Fredrikstad, Norway to Falmouth, Cornwall. Saxon was subsequently discovered by a Dutch vessel and taken in at a Dutch port.
Thomas	United Kingdom	The ship departed from Newport, Monmouthshire for Truro, Cornwall. No further trace, presumed foundered with the loss of all hands.
Trinidad	United Kingdom	The ship was driven ashore 10 nautical miles (19 km) south of the Cape Florida Lighthouse, Florida, United States. She was on a voyage from Havana, Cuba to Queenstown, County Cork. She was refloated on 8 November and taken in to Key West, Florida.
Zabina	United States	The barque was driven ashore near Étaples, Pas-de-Calais, France. She was on a voyage from Charleston, South Carolina to Étaples. She was refloated and found to be severely leaky. She had been refloated by 14 October.
Zephyr	United States	The ship was abandoned at sea. Her crew were rescued She was on a voyage from New York to Stettin.

== 11 October ==
List of shipwrecks: 11 October 1870
Ship	State	Description
Apollo	Flag unknown	The ship ran aground on the Vogelsand, in the North Sea. She was on a voyage from Hartlepool, County Durham, United Kingdom to Hamburg. She was declared a total loss.
Cilminar	United Kingdom	The ship was sighted off Portland, Dorset whilst on a voyage from Sunderland, County Durham to Rangoon, Burma. No further trace, presumed foundered with the loss of all hands.
Eclipse	United Kingdom	The ship departed from Queenstown, County Cork for the River Clyde. No further trace, presumed foundered with the loss of all hands.
Ellen	United Kingdom	The schooner departed from Penzance, Cornwall for Runcorn, Cheshire. Presumed subsequently foundered with the loss of all four crew; a boat from the ship was washed ashore.
Ely	United Kingdom	The steamship struck sunken rocks off Flat Holm, in the Bristol Channel and was beached on the island. All on board were rescued by a tug. She was on a voyage from Portishead, Somerset to Ilfracombe, Devon.
Ex	United Kingdom	The schooner stucke a sunken wreck and foundered in the North Sea. Her crew were rescued. She was on a voyage from Sunderland, County Durham to Great Yarmouth.
Kong Sverre	Norway	The barque ran aground and was wrecked on the Goodwin Sands, Kent, United Kingdom. Her crew survived; two were rescued by the Kingsdown Lifeboat. She was on a voyage from Cartagena, Spain to Leith, Lothian, United Kingdom.
Lone Star	United Kingdom	The ship departed from Cardiff for Palermo, Sicily. No further trace, presumed foundered with the loss of all hands.
Margaret	Canada	The ship was wrecked was West Quoddy, Nova Scotia. Her crew were rescued. She was on a voyage from Sheet Harbour, Nova Scotia to Rockland, Maine, United States.
Marion	United Kingdom	The steamship departed from Liverpool for Dublin. No further trace, presumed foundered in the Irish Sea with the loss of all hands.
River Mersey	United Kingdom	The ship departed from the River Mersey for Dublin. No further trace, presumed foundered with the loss of all hands.
Rockcliff	United Kingdom	The barque foundered in the South China Sea in a typhoon. Her nineteen crew were rescued the next day by Ornate (United Kingdom).

== 12 October ==
List of shipwrecks: 12 October 1870
Ship	State	Description
Aberfeldy	United Kingdom	The schooner was wrecked north of Blackwater Head with the loss of four of her seven crew. Survivors were rescued by the Coastguard using rocket apparatus. She was on a voyage from Huelva, Spain to Greenock, Renfrewshire.
Alice	United Kingdom	The ship was driven ashore at Milford Haven, Pembrokeshire and was scuttled. She was on a voyage from Cardiff to Portmadoc, Caernarfonshire.
Amelia	(United Kingdom of Great Britain and Ireland) Isle of Man	The smack was driven ashore and wrecked at Castletown. Her crew were rescued. She was on a voyage from Ramsey to Castletown.
Anne	United Kingdom	The sloop was driven ashore at Caernarfon. Her crew were rescued. She was on a voyage from Belfast to Caernarfon.
Barinaga	Spain	The ship was driven ashore and wrecked on Bardsey Island, Pembrokeshire. Her crew were rescued. She was on a voyage from Liverpool to Havana, Cuba.
Brigand	United Kingdom	The schooner was in collision with the schooner Starling (United Kingdom) and foundered off The Mumbles, Glamorgan. Her captain was rescued by Starling. Her crew were rescued by the tug Pero Gomez (United Kingdom).
Capella	United Kingdom	The schooner sprang a leak and was run ashore at Howth, County Dublin. Her crew were rescued. She was on a voyage from Whitehaven, Cumberland to Newport, Monmouthshire.
Christian	United Kingdom	The schooner was driven ashore in Killygowan Bay. She was on a voyage from Sligo, Ireland to Liverpool. She was refloated on 22 October.
C. H. Southard	United Kingdom	The ship ran aground at the mouth of the River Wye. She was on a voyage from Newport to New Orleans. She was refloated.
Clifton	United Kingdom	The barque was driven ashore in Dublin Bay. She was on a voyage from Liverpool to Prince Edward Island, Canada.
Corinna	United Kingdom	The barque was driven ashore between Neath and Swansea, Glamorgan. She was on a voyage from Porthcawl, Glamorgan to Valparaíso, Chile. She was later refloated and taken to Deal, Kent.
Cornhill	United Kingdom	The barque capsized at Newport, Monmouthshire and was severely damaged. She was righted.
Echo	United Kingdom	The barque was wrecked at "Hornia", near A Coruña, Spain. Her crew were rescued. She was on a voyage from Newport, Monmouthshire to Christiania, Norway.
Exine Vesta	Trieste	The ship ran aground on the Drum Roe Bank, in the Irish Sea. She was on a voyage from Odesa, Russia to Cork, United Kingdom She was refloated and taken in to Waterford, United Kingdom.
Fame	United Kingdom	The ship sprang a leak and was run ashore near Bootle, Lancashire, where she was wrecked. Her crew were rescued. She was on a voyage from the River Duddon to Ellesmere, Cheshire.
Fly	United Kingdom	The schooner was driven ashore and wrecked at Carnoustie, Forfarshire. Her four crew were rescued by the Coastguard using rocket apparatus. She was on a voyage from Bonar Bridge, Sutherland to Middlesbrough, Yorkshire.
Francis Darman	Flag unknown	The ship was driven ashore at Cork. She was refloated.
Hart	(United Kingdom of Great Britain and Ireland) Isle of Man	The schooner was driven ashore at Kingstown, County Dublin. She was refloated.
Humility	United Kingdom	The ship was driven ashore at Kingsdown, Kent. She was refloated on 23 October and taken in to Ramsgate, Kent in a leaky condition.
Jane and Annie	United Kingdom	The sloop was driven ashore at Caernarfon. She was on a voyage from Dundalk, County Louth to Caernarfon.
Martha Gertrude	United Kingdom	The ship foundered in the Irish Sea 15 nautical miles (28 km) south east of Cape Clear Island, County Cork with the loss of all hands. She was on a voyage from Gloucester to Limerick.
J. H. McLarren	United States	The barque was damaged by fire at South Shields, County Durham, United Kingdom.
Joseph et Marie	France	The schooner foundered off Swansea Her crew were rescued. She was on a voyage from Carloforte, Sardinia to Swansea.
Leo	United Kingdom	The steamship ran aground at South Shields, County Durham. She was on a voyage from Dundee, Forfarshire to South Shields. She was refloated and taken in to South Shields.
Ludwig	Rostock	Franco-Prussian War: The ship was captured and burnt by Desaix (French Navy).
Margaret and Mary	United Kingdom	The sloop foundered off the Cruggleton Castle, Wigtownshire with the loss of both crew. She was on a voyage from Whitehaven to Garlieston, Wigtownshire.
Maria and Betsey	United Kingdom	The schooner was driven ashore and wrecked between Cardiff and Neath. Her crew were rescued.
Mary	United Kingdom	The lighter was driven ashore and wrecked at Carradale, Argyllshire. Her crew were rescued. She was on a voyage from Ardrossan, Ayrshire to Carradale.
Mary and Betsey	United Kingdom	The schooner was driven ashore and wrecked at Port Tennant, Glamorgan.
Miran	United Kingdom	The pilot boat was driven ashore at Kingscross, Isle of Arran. She was refloated the next day.
Montcalm	United Kingdom	The brigantine foundered off Creaden Head, County Waterford. Her crew were rescued. She was on a voyage from Swansea to Wexford.
Key West	United States	The steamship ran aground off Cape Hatteras, North Carolina, and was wrecked.
Langford	United Kingdom	The ship was driven ashore and wrecked at Lowestoft, Suffolk. Her crew were rescued.
Olive	United Kingdom	The fishing smack ran aground on the Corton Sand, in the North Sea off the coast of Suffolk and was abandoned. All fifteen people on board were rescued by the Corton and Lowestoft Lifeboats Husband and Laetitia (both Royal National Lifeboat Institution). Olive was on a voyage from the Faroe Islands to Harwich, Essex.
Penguin	United Kingdom	The brigantine was abandoned off Harlyn, Cornwall in a sinking condition. Her crew were rescued. She was on a voyage from Swansea to Plymouth, Devon.
Perseverance	United Kingdom	The schooner was driven ashore and wrecked on Hayling Island, Hampshire. Her crew were rescued by the Coastguard.
Porthcawl	United Kingdom	The ship was driven ashore near Swansea. She was on a voyage from Valparaíso, Chile to Swansea.
Richard	United Kingdom	The schooner was driven ashore and wrecked at Llandulas, Caernarfonshire. Her crew were rescued. She was on a voyage from Dublin to Liverpool.
Ronald	United Kingdom	The fishing lugger foundered off the Tarbat Ness Lighthouse, Ross-shire with the loss of all hands.
Rosalie	France	The schooner was driven ashore at Southsea Castle, Hampshire. She was on a voyage from Boulogne, Pas-de-Calais to Saint-Nazaire, Ille-et-Vilaine. She was refloated and towed in to Portsmouth, Hampshire.
Rossini	Italy	The barque was driven ashore in Fabian's Bay.
Santina	Italy	The barque was wrecked on the Dowsing Shoals, in the North Sea off the coast of Norfolk, United Kingdom. Her crew were rescued. She was on a voyage from Taganrog, Russia to Boston, Lincolnshire, United Kingdom.
Saxon	United Kingdom	The schooner taken in to Vlissingen, Zeeland, Netherlands in a derelict condition.
Severn	United Kingdom	The ship was driven ashore at Harlech, Caernarfonshire. Her crew were rescued. She was on a voyage from Aberystwyth, Cardiganshire to Portmadoc.
Sir Colin Campbell	United Kingdom	The sloop was discovered off the mouth of the River Mersey in a derelict condition. She was taken in to Liverpool.
Three Sisters	United Kingdom	The brig was abandoned in the Atlantic Ocean. Her crew were rescued by the schooner Brilliant (United States). Three Sisters was on a voyage from Saint John, New Brunswick, Canada to Havana, Cuba. She subsequently came ashore on Wigim's Key.
Transit	United Kingdom	The smack was wrecked in Ramsey Sound. Both crew were rescued the next day by the St. David's Lifeboat Augusta ( Royal National Lifeboat Institution).
Vorwarts	Prussia	Franco-Prussian War: The ship was captured and burnt by Desaix (French Navy).
Welcome	United Kingdom	The smack was driven ashore at Largs, Ayrshire. Both crew were rescued. She was on a voyage from Largs to Brodick, Isle of Arran.
Welcome Home	United Kingdom	The brig foundered 10 nautical miles (19 km) off Ilfracombe, Devon. Her three crew were rescued by the pilot boat No. 6 (United Kingdom). Welcome Home was on a voyage from Newport to Plymouth, Devon.
William	United Kingdom	The ship was beached in Llandudno Bay. She was on a voyage from Dublin to Portmadoc. She was later refloated and taken in to Beaumaris, Anglesey.
Unnamed	United Kingdom	The fishing smack, identification LL41, ran aground on the Horse Bank, in the Irish Sea off the coast of Lancashire and was abandoned by her crew.
Unnamed	United Kingdom	The lighter foundered in the Holy Loch. Her crew were rescued.
Unnamed	Austria-Hungary	The barque was driven ashore in the River Wye. She was on a voyage from Southampton to Newport.
Two unnamed vessels	Flags unknown	A brigantine and schooner were driven ashore at Pendine, Glamorgan.
Unnamed	Flag unknown	The wrecked schooner was driven ashore at Douglas, Isle of Man with two bodies on board.

== 13 October ==
List of shipwrecks: 13 October 1870
Ship	State	Description
Akindo	United Kingdom	The barque was wrecked 8 nautical miles (15 km) off Innoshima, Japan. Her crew were rescued.
Ann	United Kingdom	The ship was driven ashore at Cloghy, County Down. She was on a voyage from Belfast to Garston, Lancashire. She was refloated on 17 January.
Aurelia	(United Kingdom of Great Britain and Ireland) Isle of Man	The schooner was driven ashore at Castletown. Her crew were rescued by rocket apparatus.
Brigand, and Starling	United Kingdom	The brigantine Brigand collided with Starling at Swansea, Wales and sank. Her crew were rescued. Starling ran aground and sank. Her captain was reported missing, the rest of her crew were rescued by a tug. She was on a voyage from Genoa, Italy to Gloucester.
Christina	United Kingdom	The steamship sank in Liverpool Bay off the Formby Lightship ( Trinity House) with the loss of a crew member. She was on a voyage from Liverpool to Antwerp, Belgium.
Clara	United Kingdom	The schooner was driven ashore near Prestatyn, Flintshire. She was on a voyage from Liverpool to Llandulas, Caernarfonshire.
Clara Manning	United Kingdom	The schooner was damaged by fire at Falmouth, Cornwall.
Compeer	United Kingdom	The ship was destroyed by fire in the Indian Ocean. Her crew were rescued by the barque Emma (France). Compeer was on a voyage from Greenock, Renfrewshire to Bombay, India.
Content	United Kingdom	The barque was abandoned off the Kentish Knock. She was on a voyage from London to Dunkirk, France. She was towed in to Ramsgate, Kent.
Corunna	United Kingdom	The barque was driven ashore east of Swansea. She was on a voyage from Cardiff to Plymouth, Devon. She was refloated and put in to Swansea in a severely leaky condition.
Diana	Bremen	The barque was wrecked on Tegelersplaat, in the North Sea. She was on a voyage from Granton, Lothian, United Kingdom to Bremen.
Dolphin	Wismar	The ship was driven ashore on Læsø, Denmark. She was on a voyage from Norrköping, Sweden to Hartlepool, County Durham, United Kingdom.
Emilie	Prussia	The brig was wrecked on Bornholm, Denmark. She was on a voyage from Riga, Russia to Ghent, Belgium.
Express	United Kingdom	The steamship was driven ashore at Porthdinllaen, Caernarfonshire. She was on a voyage from Mostyn, Flintshire to Newport, Monmouthshire.
Favourite	United Kingdom	The brig was driven ashore and wrecked at Ballyhornan, County Down with the loss of four of her crew. She was on a voyage from Ardrossan, Ayrshire to Dublin.
Figari	United Kingdom	The barque was wrecked on Sarn Badrig with the loss of fifteen of her 26 crew. She was on a voyage from Taganrog, Russia to Queenstown, County Cork, United Kingdom.
Gannet	United Kingdom	The steamship was driven against the quayside and damaged at Greenock.
Gratta	Prussia	The ship was driven ashore at Memel.
Gloucestershire	United Kingdom	The full-rigged ship was wrecked on the Jahde, in the North Sea. Her crew were rescued. She was on a voyage from Akyab, Burma to Bremen.
Henry	United Kingdom	The ship was driven ashore and wrecked at Llanaelhaearn, Caernarfonshire. Her crew were rescued.
Historia	United Kingdom	The ship was abandoned in the Irish Sea off the coast of Lancashire. She was on a voyage from Barrow-in-Furness, Lancashire to Newport, Monmouthshire.
Index	United Kingdom	The schooner was driven ashore at Yarmouth, Isle of Wight. She was on a voyage from Newhaven, Sussex to Yarmouth.
Jane Cameron	United Kingdom	The ship was sighted 20 nautical miles (37 km) north of Helsingør, Denmark whilst on a voyage from Stettin to South Shields, County Durham. No further trace, presumed foundered with the loss of all hands.
Janes	United Kingdom	The ship was driven ashore at Peel, Isle of Man. She was on a voyage from Dublin to Maryport, Cumberland.
Josephine et Marie	France	The brigantine ran aground and sank at Swansea. Her crew were rescued. She was on a voyage from Carloforte, Sardinia, Italy to Swansea.
Kate	United Kingdom	The ship was driven ashore and wrecked at Llanaelhaearn. Her crew were rescued.
Let	Norway	The schooner was driven ashore at Saint Andrews, Fife, United Kingdom. Her six crew were rescued by the Saint Andrews Lifeboat Annie ( Royal National Lifeboat Institution). Let was on a voyage from Sannesund to Dundee, Forfarshire, United Kingdom. Let was refloated on 31 October and towed in to Dundee by the tug Atlas (United Kingdom). She was placed under repair.
Little Liz	United Kingdom	The schooner was wrecked at Aberayron or New Quay, Cardiganshire. Her crew were rescued.
Macedon	United Kingdom	The ship was severely damaged in the Salisbury Dock, Liverpool.
Mary	United Kingdom	The brigantine was driven ashore and sank at Craden Head, County Waterford. Her crew were rescued. She was on a voyage from Greenock to Wexford.
Mary	United Kingdom	The ship was driven ashore and wrecked in Porth Neigwl. Her crew were rescued. She was on a voyage from Waterford to Cardiff.
Mary	United Kingdom	The schooner was driven ashore at Cloghy. She was on a voyage from Dundee to Silloth, Cumberland. She was later refloated with the assistance of the steamship Shamrock (United Kingdom)
Merrimac	United Kingdom	The ship was wrecked on the Jahde. Her crew were rescued. She was on a voyage from Akyab, Burma to Bremen. The wreck subsequently broke up. Part of the ship came ashore at "Krildumersield", Prussia in mid-November.
Modeste Eugene	France	The lugger was wrecked at Bude, Cornwall, United Kingdom with the loss of all but one of her five crew. She was on a voyage from Swansea, Wales to Bilbao, Spain.
Morning Glory	United Kingdom	The ship was wrecked on the Jahde. Her crew were rescued. She was on a voyage from Akyab to Bremen.
Mountain Calm	United Kingdom	The schooner was driven ashore and wrecked at Craden Head. Her crew were rescued. She was on a voyage from Swansea to Wexford.
Nugget	United Kingdom	The ship was driven ashore near Garston. She was on a voyage from to Garston to Runcorn, Cheshire.
Renown	United Kingdom	The schooner was driven ashore at Port Penrhyn, Caernarfonshire.
Spread Eagle	United Kingdom	The smack was driven ashore and wrecked at New Quay. Her crew were rescued.
Stewarts	United Kingdom	The schooner was driven ashore and severely damaged at Siccar Point, Berwickshire with the loss of all four crew. She was on a voyage from Sunderland, County Durham to Peterhead, Aberdeenshire. She was declared a total loss.
Thames	United Kingdom	The ship was severely damaged in the Salisbury Dock, Liverpool.
Thomas	United Kingdom	The ship was driven ashore at Cloghy. She was on a voyage from Belfast to Garston.
Turtle Dove	United Kingdom	The ship was beached in Llandudno Bay. She was on a voyage from Plymouth, Devon to Runcorn.
Undine	United Kingdom	The schooner was driven ashore and wrecked 2 nautical miles (3.7 km) east of "Littlehampton". Her crew were rescued. She was on a voyage from Hartlepool, to Goole, Yorkshire.
Three unnamed vessels	Flags unknown	The schooners were wrecked on the Burbo and West Hoyle Banks, in Liverpool Bay with the presumed loss of all hands.
Unnamed	United Kingdom	The lighter was driven ashore and wrecked on Great Cumbrae, Argyllshire.
Unnamed	United Kingdom	The schooner sprang a leak and caught fire off Carradale, Argyllshire.
Unnamed	United Kingdom	The smack was driven ashore and wrecked at Carradale. Her crew were rescued.
Four unnamed vessels	United Kingdom	The fishing smacks were driven ashore and wrecked at Carradale.
Unnamed	United Kingdom	The lighter foundered in the Belfast Lough. Both crew were rescued by the Coastguard.

== 14 October ==
List of shipwrecks: 14 October 1870
Ship	State	Description
Amelia	United Kingdom	The ship broke in two and foundered in Santoria Bay with the loss of five of her nine crew. She was on a voyage from Swansea, Wales to Bilbao, Spain.
Angeline	United Kingdom	The schooner was driven ashore at Dunkirk, France. She was on a voyage from Algiers, French Algeria to Dunkirk.
Apollo	Hamburg	The barque was driven ashore on Heligoland. Her crew were rescued. She was on a voyage from Hartlepool, County Durham, United Kingdom to Hamburg.
Aurora	Prussia	The brig was driven ashore at Dunkirk. She was on a voyage from Trieste to Dunkirk.
Charlotte	Prussia	Franco-Prussian War: The barque was captured and sunk by Desaix (French Navy)
Dante	Italy	The ship sank in Cardigan Bay with the loss of eight of the eleven people on board.
Despatch	United Kingdom	The smack was driven ashore at Penrhos, Anglesey.
George	United Kingdom	The schooner was driven ashore at Ballyhack, County Wexford.
Henry	United Kingdom	The ship was driven ashore at Clynnog, Caernarfonshire. Her crew were rescued. she was on a voyage from Briton Ferry, Glamorgan to Llandulas, Caernarfonshire.
Historia	United Kingdom	The abandoned barque was discovered in Morecambe Bay by the fishing vessel Otter (United Kingdom), which put two men on board. She was towed in to Fleetwood, Lancashire by the steamships Kirklees and Wyre (both United Kingdom). It was discovered that an attempt had been made to scuttle Historia. She was on a voyage from Barrow in Furness, Lancashire to Newport, Monmouthshire.
Hope	United Kingdom	The ship was wrecked on Puffin Island, Anglesey. Her crew were rescued.
J. B. Watt	United Kingdom	The steamship was run into by the steamship Thuringia (Hamburg) and sank 20 nautical miles (37 km) off the mouth of the Elbe. Her crew were rescued by Thuringia. J. B. Watt was on a voyage from Hamburg to Hartlepool.
Kate	United Kingdom	The schooner was driven ashore at Clynnog. Her crew were rescued. She was on a voyage from Swansea, Wales to Belfast.
Langford	United Kingdom	The lugger was driven ashore at Lowestoft, Suffolk.
Margaret	United Kingdom	The schooner was driven ashore at Ballyhack.
Nymph	United Kingdom	The schooner sprang a leak and was abandoned in the North Sea 40 nautical miles (74 km) off Great Yarmouth, Norfolk. Her crew were rescued. She was on a voyage from Runcorn, Cheshire to Harlingen, Friesland.
Proverb	United Kingdom	The ship foundered off Great Yarmouth. Her crew were rescued.
Seven Sisters	United Kingdom	The ship ran aground on the Dutchman's Bank, in the Irish Sea. She was on a voyage from Pomaron, Portugal to Liverpool. She was refloated and taken in to Bangor, Caernarfonshire in a leaky condition.
Sorrento	United States	The ship was driven ashore and wrecked at Porthgolmon, Caernarfonshire with the loss of a crew member. She was on a voyage from Liverpool to New Orleans.
Turtle Dove	United Kingdom	The schooner was driven ashore and wrecked at Llandudno, Denbighshire. She was on a voyage from Plymouth, Devon to Runcorn.
Two Sisters	United Kingdom	The ship was wrecked on the One Bush Reef. Her crew were rescued. She was on a voyage from Grand Cayman, Cayman Islands to Kingston, Jamaica.
Unnamed	Unflagged	A steamship under construction at Low Walker, Northumberland heeled over when the ground subsided under her. Six people were killed and thirteen were severely wounded.

== 15 October ==
List of shipwrecks: 15 October 1870
Ship	State	Description
Chevy Chase	United States	The ship was driven ashore at Cape Henry, Virginia. She was on a voyage from Liverpool to Baltimore, Maryland. She was later refloated and taken in to Baltimore.
Emily	United Kingdom	The ship was driven ashore at Inch Point, County Kerry. She was refloated on 7 November.
Eureka	Canada	The ship was destroyed by fire at Cardiff, Wales.
Pride of the West	United Kingdom	The ship foundered off the mouth of the River Humber. Her crew were rescued. She was on a voyage from Neath, Glamorgan to South Shields, County Durham.
Regina	United States	The barque was driven ashore on Scharhörn, Hamburg. Her crew were rescued. She was on a voyage from New York to Hamburg.
Victorine	France	The brigantine was driven ashore and wrecked on the Pendine Sands, Carmarthenshire, United Kingdom. Her crew were rescued. She was on a voyage from Swansea, Wales to Cherbourg, France.
Washington	United States	The ship was destroyed by fire in the Cape Fear River. She was on a voyage from Wilmington, Delaware to New York.

== 16 October ==
List of shipwrecks: 16 October 1870
Ship	State	Description
Alice	United Kingdom	The schooner was driven ashore on Walney Island, Lancashire with the loss of all hands. She was on a voyage from Millom, Cumberland to Liverpool.
Asia	United Kingdom	The steamship was lost at "Port Orotave" Tenerife, Canary Islands. Her crew were rescued. She was on a voyage from London to Barranquilla, United States of Colombia.
Circassia	Norway	The full-rigged ship was driven ashore near Fredrikshavn, Denmark. She was on a voyage from Riga, Russia to Southampton, United Kingdom. She subsequently became a wreck.
Daylight	United Kingdom	The barque was driven ashore between Hurst Castle and Lymington, Hampshire. She was on a voyage from Sunderland, County Durham to Alexandria, Egypt. She was refloated the next day and taken in to the Solent.
Gleaner	United Kingdom	The brigantine was driven ashore near Porthdinllaen, Caernarfonshire. Her three crew were rescued by the Porthdinllaen Lifeboat Cotton Sheppard ( Royal National Lifeboat Institution).
Naomi	United Kingdom	The ship ran aground off Silloth, Cumberland. She was on a voyage from Montevideo, Uruguay to Silloth. She was refloated the next day and taken in to Silloth.
Royalist	United Kingdom	The ship capsized in the English Channel. Her crew were rescued. She was on a voyage from Plymouth, Devon to Sunderland, County Durham.
Sarah Jane	United Kingdom	The ship ran aground at Kirton, Suffolk. She was on a voyage from Sunderland to Alexandria, Egypt. She was refloated on 31 October and put back to Sunderland for repairs.
Sydney	United Kingdom	Memorial to those lost on the Sydney. The barque was wrecked off Glen Head, Sturrall, County Donegal with the loss of nineteen of her 21 crew. She was on a voyage from Quebec City, Canada to Greenock, Renfrewshire.
Watson	United Kingdom	The smack was driven ashore and wrecked between Anstruther and Crail, Fife with the loss of two of her three crew. She was on a voyage from Newcastle upon Tyne, Northumberland to St. Andrews, Fife.

== 17 October ==
List of shipwrecks: 17 October 1870
Ship	State	Description
Alfred and Emma	United Kingdom	The schooner was wrecked in Dally Bay. Her crew were rescued. She was on a voyage from Swansea to Greenock, Renfrewshire.
Cochrane	United Kingdom	The ship ran aground near Juist, Kingdom of Prussia and capsized. Her crew were rescued. She was on a voyage from Greenock to Hamburg. Also reported as Cochran Hendry ashore on South Uist, Outer Hebrides.
Flying Foam	United Kingdom	The ship was driven ashore and sank at Hope Cove, Devon.
Gipsy King	United Kingdom	The schooner was wrecked at Dulas, Anglesey with the loss of nine of her ten crew. The survivor was rescued by the Moelfre Lifeboat.
Huntress	United Kingdom	The ship was driven ashore in the Larne Lough. She was on a voyage from Liverpool to Riga, Russia. She was later refloated.
Julie Caroline	Norway	The ship foundered in the North Sea. Her crew were rescued by the schooner Louise Henriette (Russia). Julie Caroline was on a voyage from East Wemyss, Fife, United Kingdom to Åsgårdstrand.
Louis Faun Fanny	France	The lugger was driven ashore at Plymouth, Devon She was refloated.
Lydia Cumming	United Kingdom	The ship was driven ashore and wrecked at Cushendall, County Antrim. She was on a voyage from Maryport, Cumberland to Dublin.
Orange Grove	United Kingdom	The ship was driven ashore at Ayr. Her fifteen crew were rescued by the Ayr Lifeboat Glasgow Workman ( Royal National Lifeboat Institution). Orange Grove was on a voyage from Greenock to Demerara, British Guiana.

== 18 October ==
List of shipwrecks: 18 October 1870
Ship	State	Description
Alida	Netherlands	The ship was driven ashore. She was on a voyage from London to Danzig. She was refloated and taken in to Great Yarmouth, Norfolk in a leaky condition.
Anje	Netherlands	The ship ran aground in the Baltic Sea. She was on a voyage from Saint Petersburg, Russia to Amsterdam. She was refloated and taken in to a Baltic port in a leaky condition.
Barteld	Russia	The ship sank in Kolk Bay. Her crew were rescued. She was on a voyage from Saint Petersburg to Amsterdam.
Boxer	United Kingdom	The brig was beached near Visby, Sweden in a waterlogged condition. She was on a voyage from Kronstadt, Russia to Grimsby, Lincolnshire. She was later refloated.
Brother's Pride	United Kingdom	The ship was driven ashore the Rhyl, Denbighshire.
Bury St. Edmunds	United Kingdom	The ship was beached in the River Thames. She was on a voyage from Mauritius to London. She was refloated the next day.
Cossack	United Kingdom	The steamship sank at Copenhagen, Denmark. She was on a voyage from Königsberg, Prussia to Hull, Yorkshire.
Emerald	United Kingdom	The barque was wrecked on the Haisborough Sands, in the North Sea off the coast of Norfolk. Her crew were rescued by Leader (United Kingdom). Emerald was on a voyage from Sunderland, County Durham to Alexandria, Egypt.
Emma Blake	United States	The schooner was driven ashore and wrecked at Toledo, Ohio with the loss of all on board.
Eugenie	Flag unknown	The ship was driven ashore at "Kurop". She was on a voyage from Kronstadt, Russia to a Belgian port.
Glenora	United Kingdom	The brig was driven ashore at Lowestoft, Suffolk. Her seven crew were rescued by the Lowestoft Lifeboat Laetitia ( Royal National Lifeboat Institution). Glenora was on a voyage from South Shields, County Durham to Rochester, Kent.
Haabet	Denmark	The ship collided with the barque Emigrant (United Kingdom) and sank in the North Sea. Her crew were rescued by Emigrant. Haabet was on a voyage from Copenhagen to Leith, Lothian, United Kingdom.
Mary Amelia	United States	The ship foundered in Lake Erie with the loss of all hands.
Orion	United States	The steamship was wrecked near Grand Haven, Michigan. All on board were rescued. She was on a voyage from Chicago to Grand Haven.
Rechabite	United Kingdom	The fishing smack was run into by the brigantine Caroline (United Kingdom)) at Tenby, Pembrokeshire and was severely damaged. Her three crew were rescued by Caroline. Rechabite was taken in to Tenby, where she sank.
Skibladner	Sweden	The ship ran aground at Fredrikshavn, Denmark. She was on a voyage from Söderhamn to Aalborg, Denmark.
Speculationen	Norway	The brig was abandoned off Smith's Knoll, in the North Sea off the coast of Norfolk. Her crew were rescued. She was on a voyage from Arendal to Ostend, Belgium.
Thetis	United Kingdom	The brig was wrecked at Bic, Quebec, Canada with the loss of three of her nine crew. She was on a voyage from Silloth, Cumberland to Quebec City. Thetis was refloated with the assistance of the brig St. George and taken in to Quebec City.
Tonawanda	United States	The steamship was wrecked in Lake Erie. All on board survived. She was on a voyage from Chicago to Buffalo, New York.
Zillah	United Kingdom	The ship collided with the steamship Victoria (United Kingdom) and sank in the Shipway. Her crew were rescued. She was on a voyage from Rochester, Kent to South Shields, County Durham.
Two unnamed vessels	United States	The ships were wrecked near Cleveland, Ohio with the loss of all hands.

== 19 October ==
List of shipwrecks: 19 October 1870
Ship	State	Description
A. B. Bradshaw	United Kingdom	The brig was driven ashore and wrecked at Matanzas, Cuba.
Alvin Buckingham	United States	Alvin Buckingham in 2015. After the wooden schooner started to leak in Lake Huron off Black River Island, her crew beached her in shallow water on the coast of Michigan, where she sank in 8 feet (2.4 m) of water at 44.840983°N 83.285383°W.
Bee	United Kingdom	The ship was damaged by fire at Montrose, Forfarshire.
Berlin	Bremen	The steamship ran aground on the Robben Plaat, in the North Sea. She was on a voyage from Baltimore, Maryland, United States to Bremen. She was later refloated and taken in to Bremerhaven.
Birdston	United Kingdom	The full-rigged ship was driven ashore and wrecked at Matanzas.
Brothers	United Kingdom	The schooner was driven ashore and wrecked in Manxmans Lake, Dumfriesshire. She was on a voyage from Newry, Ireland to Dalbeattie, Dumfriesshire.
Cambria	United Kingdom	The passenger-cargo steamship was wrecked off the Giant's Causeway, County Antrim with the loss of 178 of the 179 people on board. The survivor was rescued by the steamship Enterprise (United Kingdom). Cambria was on a voyage from New York, United States to Liverpool, Lancashire.
Cercalia	United Kingdom	The barque was wrecked on the Haisborough Sands, in the North Sea off the coast of Norfolk. Her crew were rescued by a Dutch fishing boat. She was on a voyage from Constanta, Ottoman Empire to Hull, Yorkshire.
Chalena	United States	The ship was wrecked in a hurricane at Cuba.
Crescendo	Netherlands	The brig struck a sunken rock off Porkkalanniemi, Grand Duchy of Finland and sank. Her crew were rescued. She was on a voyage from Saint Petersburg to Amsterdam.
Darien	France	The steamship was wrecked in a hurricane at Molena Point, Cuba. Her passengers were rescued by the steamship Guantanamo (Spain).
Edwin	United States	The schooner was wrecked in a hurricane at Matanzas. Her crew survived.
Enigheden	Norway	The schooner was driven ashore and wrecked in Wick Bay with the loss of four of her five crew. She was on a voyage from Christiania to Fraserburgh, Aberdeenshire, United Kingdom.
Equator	United Kingdom	The brig was severely damaged in a hurricane at Cárdenas, Cuba.
Evening Star	United Kingdom	The barque was driven ashore and wrecked at Matanzas.
Frank Palmer	United States	The schooner was damaged in a hurricane at Matanzas.
Graf von Bylandt	Netherlands	The steamship sank in the Amstel. She was on a voyage from Amsterdam to Rotterdam.
George S. Hunt	United States	The barque was driven ashore and wrecked in a hurricane at Matanzas.
Guantanamo	United States	The ship was wrecked in a hurricane at Cuba.
G. W. Barter	United States	The brig was driven ashore at Matanzas.
Ida	United Kingdom	The schooner was wrecked on the Pedro Cays. She was on a voyage from the Cayman Islands to Jamaica.
Jane Lovat	United Kingdom	The schooner was driven ashore and wrecked at Cushendall, County Antrim. She was on a voyage from Maryport, Cumberland to Dublin.
Johann Christian	Rostock	The ship was driven ashore on Møn, Denmark. Her crew were rescued.
Mary A. Chase	United States	The brig was damaged in a hurricane at Matanzas.
Matanzas	United States	The ship was wrecked in a hurricane at Cuba.
Maulius	United Kingdom	The barque was severely damaged in a hurricane at Matanzas.
Ricardo	Spain	The ship was driven ashore in a hurricane at Cárdenas.
Rosita	United Kingdom	The brig was wrecked in a hurricane at Cárdenas.
Speedaway	United Kingdom	The barque was driven ashore in a hurricane and wrecked on the Boca de la Moruvi, off the coast of Cuba.
S. V. Nichols	United Kingdom	The brig was driven ashore and wrecked in a hurricane at Matanzas.
Sydney	United Kingdom	The ship was wrecked near "Mahermore", County Donegal with the loss of all but two of her 21 crew. She was on a voyage from Quebec City, Canada to Greenock, Renfrewshire.
Valeria	United States	The schooner was wrecked at Cárdenas.
Unnamed	(Spain) Cuba	At least two schooners were run into and sunk by the schooner Edwin (United States) during a hurricane at Matanza.

== 20 October ==
List of shipwrecks: 20 October 1870
Ship	State	Description
Duquesne	France	The barque was driven ashore at Whitburn, County Durham, United Kingdom. Her crew were rescued. She was on a voyage from Genoa, Italy to Montrose, Forfarshire, United Kingdom.
Marie Stella	France	The brig was driven ashore and wrecked at Dieppe, France with the loss of all but two of her crew. She was on a voyage from Havre de Grâce, Seine-Inférieure to L'Orient, Morbihan.
Odessa	United States	The ship was driven ashore at the mouth of the Weser. Her crew were rescued. She was on a voyage from New York to Bremen.
Sirocco	United Kingdom	The brig foundered in the North Sea. Her seven crew were rescued. She was on a voyage from Sunderland, County Durham to Ostend, Belgium.
Varuna	United States	The steamship foundered off the Jupiter Inlet, Florida with the loss of most of her crew and all 36 passengers. There were five survivors. She was on a voyage from New York to Galveston, Texas.

== 21 October ==
List of shipwrecks: 21 October 1870
Ship	State	Description
Automaton	United Kingdom	The brig was wrecked near Ljusne, Sweden. Her crew were rescued. She was on a voyage from Reval, Russia to Söderhamn, Sweden.
Britannia	United Kingdom	The sloop was driven ashore and wrecked in How Bay, Orkney Islands. Her crew were rescued. She was on a voyage from Aberdeen to Kirkwall, Orkney Islands.
Felix	Prussia	The barque was damaged by an onboard explosion at Sunderland, County Durham, United Kingdom. Her captain was severely wounded.
Ino	United Kingdom	The ship departed from Queenstown, County Cork for Hull, Yorkshire. No further trace, presumed foundered with the loss of all hands.
John Bagshaw	United Kingdom	The brig sank off Caernarfon with the loss of a crew member. She was on a voyage from Pernambuco, Brazil to Liverpool.
Maria	United Kingdom	The ship was driven ashore and sank at Fishguard, Pembrokeshire. Her crew were rescued. She was on a voyage from Plymouth, Devon to Runcorn, Cheshire.
Mary	United Kingdom	The ship was driven ashore at "Mallbrack", Anglesey. Her crew were rescued. She was on a voyage from Skibbereen, County Cork to Cardiff.
Vivid	United Kingdom	The sloop was driven ashore and wrecked at "Craigheath", Banffshire. Her crew were rescued. She was on a voyage from Saint Petersburg, Russia to Portgordon, Moray.
Zarco	United Kingdom	The steamship was driven ashore at Catanzaro, Kingdom of Italy. She had broken up by mid-December.
Unnamed	Canada	The ship was driven ashore at Horsehead, near North Cape, Prince Edward Island. She was on a voyage from Miramichi, New Brunswick to a British port.
Unnamed	Flag unknown	The barque collided with Red Ridinghood (United Kingdom) and foundered in the Atlantic Ocean.

== 22 October ==
List of shipwrecks: 22 October 1870
Ship	State	Description
Anna Colbjornsen	Sweden	The ship ran aground on the Finngrund, in the Baltic Sea. She was on a voyage from Luleå to Plymouth, Devon, United Kingdom. She was refloated and put in to Stockholm in a leaky condition.
Asinga	Russia	The ship sank in the North Sea. Her crew survived.
Corolitz	Flag unknown	The ship ran aground on the Vogelsand, in the North Sea. She was on a voyage from Miragoâne, Haiti to Hamburg. She was refloated and taken in to Cuxhaven in a leaky condition.
Jefferson Boardman	United States	The schooner was wrecked 3 nautical miles (5.6 km) south of the Hillsboro Inlet with the loss of a crew member.
Lily	United Kingdom	The brigantine was wrecked near Westhaven, Forfarshire.
Olivier	France	The barque ran aground on the Large Bank, off the coast of Sumatra, Netherlands East Indies. She was on a voyage from Macao, China to Callao, Peru.
Sapphire	United Kingdom	The steamship was wrecked on a reef in Elliot's Bay, Florida, United States. All on board were rescued. She was on a voyage from Liverpool to Havana, Cuba.
Volant	United Kingdom	The ship was driven ashore near Blyth, Northumberland. She was on a voyage from Liverpool to Newcastle upon Tyne, Northumberland. She was refloated and completed her voyage.
Watchful	United Kingdom	The brig sprang a leak and was abandoned at sea. She was on a voyage from Huelva, Spain to Ipswich, Suffolk. She came ashore near Faro, Portugal and was wrecked.

== 23 October ==
List of shipwrecks: 23 October 1870
Ship	State	Description
Blue Jacket	(United Kingdom of Great Britain and Ireland) Jersey	The barque was abandoned in the Gaspar Strait. Her crew were rescued by the barque Grace Piel (United States). Blue Jacket was on a voyage from Hiogo, Japan to Falmouth, Cornwall.
Broanstone	United Kingdom	The ship ran aground off Pakefield, Suffolk and was consequently beached at Hopton-on-Sea, Suffolk. Her crew were rescued.
Fawn	United Kingdom	The steamship was driven ashore and wrecked at Lowestoft, Suffolk. Her fifteen crew were rescued by the Coastguard using rocket apparatus. She was on a voyage from Kronstadt, Russia to London. She was refloated.
John Banks	United Kingdom	The ship was wrecked on a reef 50 nautical miles (93 km) off Chittagong, India.
Mary	United Kingdom	The ship schooner was abandoned in a sinking condition 5 nautical miles (9.3 km) south east of Aldeburgh, Suffolk. Her crew were rescued by the steamship Long Ditton (United Kingdom).
Petrel	(United Kingdom of Great Britain and Ireland) Trinidad	The ship was wrecked 100 nautical miles (190 km) north west of Belize City, British Honduras. She was on a voyage from Roatán, British Honduras to Baltimore, Maryland, United States.

== 24 October ==
List of shipwrecks: 24 October 1870
Ship	State	Description
Branstons	United Kingdom	The brig ran aground off Pakefield, Suffolk and was consequently beached at Corton, Suffolk. Her crew were rescued. She was refloated and taken in to Great Yarmouth, Norfolk in a derelict condition.
Buttercup	United Kingdom	The steam wherry capsized in the River Tyne at Jarrow, Northumberland.
Caroline	United Kingdom	The brigantine struck the Highland Patch, off Caldey Island, Pembrokeshire. Her five crew were rescued by a Tenby boat. She was on a voyage from Neath, Glamorgan to Newry, Ireland. She subsequently foundered in Carmarthen Bay 3 nautical miles (5.6 km) north east of the Woodhouse Beacon.
Fenella	United Kingdom	The steamship ran aground on Scroby Sands, Norfolk. She was on a voyage from London to South Shields, County Durham and/or Newcastle upon Tyne, Northumberland. She was refloated with assistance.
Fox	United Kingdom	The steamship sank at Blackwall, Middlesex.
Liberty	United Kingdom	The brig sprang a leak and sank at Speeton, Yorkshire. Her crew were rescued by two fishing cobles. She was on a voyage from Newcastle upon Tyne to London.
Lovisa	Flag unknown	The ship was driven ashore on the east coast of Öland, Sweden. She was refloated and taken in to Kalmar.
Mabel	United Kingdom	The brig foundered in the North Sea off Lista, Norway. Her nine crew were rescued by Friedrich Wilhelm ( Danzig). Mabel was on a voyage from Hartlepool, County Durham to Danzig.
Mary Ann	United Kingdom	The sloop sprang a leak and was beached at North Shields, Northumberland.
Rosine	France	The brig was driven ashore and wrecked between Atherfield and Chale, Isle of Wight, United Kingdom. Her crew were rescued by rocket apparatus. She was on a voyage from Haiti to Havre de Grâce, France.
Squire	United Kingdom	The ship collided with Jessie (United Kingdom) and was beached at Neyland, Pembrokeshire. She was on a voyage from Barrow-in-Furness, Lancashire to Swansea, Glamorgan.
Stefano Grosso	Italy	The brig was wrecked off Port Isaac, Cornwall, United Kingdom. Nine of her twelve crew were rescued by rocket apparatus, the others were rescued by the Port Isaac lifeboat Richard and Sarah ( Royal National Lifeboat Institution). Stefano Grosso was on a voyage from Sulina, Ottoman Empire to Hull, Yorkshire, United Kingdom.
Verita	Italy	The barque was abandoned in Walton Bay. Her ten crew were rescued. Verita was on a voyage from Genoa to Cardiff. She was subsequently driven ashore and wrecked at Clevedon, Somerset, United Kingdom.

== 25 October ==
List of shipwrecks: 25 October 1870
Ship	State	Description
Anna Marina	United Kingdom	The ship was wrecked at Lista, Norway. Her crew were rescued.
Bloomer	United Kingdom	The ship was driven ashore on Little Ross, Kirkcudbrightshire.
"Equity"	United States	The fishing boat was wrecked at Spectacle Island. Crew saved.
Fox	United Kingdom	The steamship sank in the Victoria Dock.
Liberty	United Kingdom	The brig foundered in the North Sea 2 nautical miles (3.7 km) north east of Speeton, Yorkshire. Her eight crew were rescued by two fishing cobles. She was on a voyage from South Shields, County Durham to London.
Mary Ann	United Kingdom	The lugger foundered off Whitby, Yorkshire.
Meteor Flag	United Kingdom	The brigantine ran aground and capsized at Caernarfon. Her five crew were rescued by the Llanduyn Lifeboat John Gray Bell ( Royal National Lifeboat Institution). Meteor Flag was on a voyage from Londonderry to Swansea, Glamorgan.
Shakespeare	United Kingdom	The ship was driven ashore near the mouth of the Seine. Her crew were rescued. She was on a voyage from London to Shanghai, China. She was declared a total loss.
Unnamed	United Kingdom	The schooner foundered off Lundy Island, Devon. Her six crew were rescued by the pilot boat No. 4 (United Kingdom).

== 26 October ==
List of shipwrecks: 26 October 1870
Ship	State	Description
Amazon	United Kingdom	The barque was damaged by fire at Galveston, Texas, United States. She was on a voyage from Liverpool to Galveston.
Cecile Marie	France	The barque ran aground on the Saugor Hall Sand.
Emma Sopbhia	Norway	The brig was wrecked on the Morant Cays. Her crew survived. She was on a voyage from Rio de Janeiro, Brazil to New Orleans.
G. F. O. Heyn	Germany	The ship departed from Moulmein, Burma for a British port. No further trace, presumed foundered with the loss of all hands.
Kennet	United Kingdom	The ship was driven ashore and wrecked at Bridport, Dorset. All five people on board were rescued by rocket apparatus. She was on a voyage from Waterford to Rye, Sussex.
Verita	Italy	The barque was driven ashore at Clevedon, Somerset, United Kingdom. She was on a voyage from Cardiff to Genoa.

== 27 October ==
List of shipwrecks: 27 October 1870
Ship	State	Description
Argo	United Kingdom	The ship was lost on this date.
Cherub	United Kingdom	The ship was wrecked at Peel, Isle of Man. She was on a voyage from Maryport, Cumberland to an Irish port.
Elizabeth	(United Kingdom of Great Britain and Ireland) Guernsey	The brigantine foundered off St. Martin's Point, Guernsey. Her eight crew were rescued by Sark fishermen. She was on a voyage from "New" to Guernsey.
Investigator	United Kingdom	The barque was lost at Cayo Arenas. Her sixteen crew were rescued. She was on a voyage from Campeche, Mexico to Falmouth, Cornwall.
Jato	Sweden	The ship was wrecked near Egersund, Norway. She was on a voyage from Middlesbrough, Yorkshire to Gävle.
Kennet	United Kingdom	The ship was driven ashore and wrecked at Bridport, Dorset. Her crew were rescued. She was on a voyage from Waterford to Bridport.
North Alabama	United States	The steamer was wrecked on a sandbar in the Missouri River west of Vermillion, South Dakota in what's today the Myron Grove Lake Access area. Her equipment was salvaged. Barrels of whiskey in her cargo were salvaged in 1890, or in 1906 when she reportedly somehow briefly regained buoyancy on 10 July.
Royal George	United Kingdom	The ship was driven ashore at Havre de Grâce, France.
Sunbeam	United Kingdom	The ship departed from Quebec City, Canada for Port Glasgow, Renfrewshire. No further trace, presumed foundered with the loss of all hands.

== 28 October ==
List of shipwrecks: 28 October 1870
Ship	State	Description
Aurora	United Kingdom	The ship was driven ashore at Kronstadt, Russia and was damaged. She was on a voyage from Saint Petersburg, Russia to Leith, Lothian. She was consequently condemned.
Eleanore	United Kingdom	The ship was driven ashore in the Fox River. She was on a voyage from Quebec City, Canada to Sharpness, Gloucestershire.
Fortuna	Belgium	The ship was wrecked on the Dutch coast. She was on a voyage from Antwerp to Riga, Russia.
Geneva	Canada	The ship was wrecked on a reef off Godrevy, Cornwall, United Kingdom with the loss of all 22 crew. She was on a voyage from Liverpool to Saint John, New Brunswick.
Jim	United Kingdom	The fishing boat foundered at Clovelly, Devon. Both crew were rescued by the Clovelly Lifeboat Alexander and Matilda Bœtefeur ( Royal National Lifeboat Institution).
Waimea	New South Wales	The steamship was run down and sunk by the steamship Avoca (New South Wales) at Sydney.

== 29 October ==
List of shipwrecks: 29 October 1870
Ship	State	Description
Ceres	Norway	The ship was driven ashore on Texel, North Holland, Netherlands. She was on a voyage from Drobak to Folkestone, Kent, United Kingdom. She was a total loss.
Hispania	United Kingdom	The steamship was driven ashore at Nagara Point, in the Dardanelles. She was on a voyage from Grimsby, Lincolnshire to Constantinople. She was refloated on 2 November.
USS Saginaw	United States Navy	Wreck of USS Saginaw The sidewheel sloop-of-war was wrecked in the Pacific Ocean off Kure Atoll.

== 30 October ==
List of shipwrecks: 30 October 1870
Ship	State	Description
Gibraltar	United Kingdom	The ship was wrecked on the Turneffe Atoll, near Rendezvous Point, British Honduras. She was on a voyage from Belize City, British Honduras to London.
John Myers	United Kingdom	The schooner was run into by Elizabeth (United Kingdom) and sank in the River Thames at Gravesend, Kent. Her crew were rescued. She was on a voyage from Middlesbrough, Yorkshire to London.
Morning Star	Canada	The ship was abandoned in the Atlantic Ocean with the loss of five of her crew. She was on a voyage from Cap-Haïtien, Haiti to Boston, Massachusetts, United States.

== 31 October ==
List of shipwrecks: 31 October 1870
Ship	State	Description
Elma E. Hawes	United Kingdom	The ship was driven ashore and sank at Harwich, Essex.

== Unknown date ==
List of shipwrecks: Unknown date in October 1870
Ship	State	Description
Adelphi	United Kingdom	The ship was driven ashore. She as on a voyage from Dublin to Dundrum, County Down. She was refloated and taken in to Warrenpoint, County Down.
Advance	United Kingdom	The ship was driven ashore and wrecked 5 nautical miles (9.3 km) west of Nefyn, Caernarfonshire. She was on a voyage from Arkhangelsk, Russia to Bristol.
Alatamaha	United States	The fishing schooner was lost on the Georges Bank. Lost with all 10 hands.
Alberto	Italy	The brig was driven ashore at Servola, near Trieste.
Alexandria	United Kingdom	The ship was wrecked near Havana, Cuba before 18 October with the loss of seven of her crew. She was on a voyage from Havana to New York.
Algorna	United States	The steamship foundered in Lake Superior with the loss of more than 100 lives.
Alice Thompson	United Kingdom	The ship was wrecked at Swatow, China.
Amazon	United Kingdom	The barque was driven ashore at the Jupiter Inlet Lighthouse, Florida, United States. She was on a voyage from Liverpool to Galveston, Texas, United States. She was later refloated and completed her voyage.
Annie Cowart	United Kingdom	The ship was driven ashore in Loch Indaal. She was on a voyage from Troon, Ayrshire to Kronstadt, Russia. She was refloated and taken in to Lough Foyle for repairs.
Antilla	United Kingdom	The ship was abandoned at sea. She was on a voyage from Philadelphia to Dublin.
Arctic Hero	United Kingdom	The ship was driven ashore at Hittarp, Sweden. She was on a voyage from Hull, Yorkshire to Danzig. She was refloated.
Argo	Denmark	The schooner was driven ashore near Lubava, Courland Governorate before 27 October. She was on a voyage from Lubava to Grimsby, Lincolnshire, United Kingdom. She was refloated and taken in to Copenhagen.
Bernardus Godelievus	Italy	The ship was assisted in to Ostend, Belgium in a sinking condition. She was on a voyage from Newcastle upon Tyne, Northumberland, United Kingdom to Messina, Sicily and Trieste.
Bertha	United Kingdom	The ship was driven ashore at Arkhangelsk between 2 and 4 October.
Bertha	Norway	The ship ran aground on the Brake Sand. She was refloated and taken in to Ramsgate, Kent, United Kingdom.
Bessie Rodgers	United States	The ship ran aground at Philadelphia. She was on a voyage from Alicante, Spain to Philadelphia.
Blue Bell	United Kingdom	The ship ran aground at East Hartlepool, County Durham.
Brandt	Flag unknown	Franco-Prussian War: The ship was captured and burnt by Desaix (French Navy).
Bring D Tobias	United States	The ship was lost in Chedabucto Bay.
Brothers	United Kingdom	The ship collided with the steamship Athlete (United Kingdom) and sank. Brothers was on a voyage from Wexford to Gloucester.
Cambria	United States	The ship was wrecked on the North Breakers. She was on a voyage from Bahia, Brazil to Galveston, Texas.
Cambridge	United Kingdom	The steamship was driven ashore at "Storedam". She was refloated and taken in to Texel, Netherlands.
Caribou	Canada	The ship was driven ashore at Lake St. Peter, Ontario. She was on a voyage from Swansea, Wales to Montreal, Quebec. She was later refloated and taken in to Montreal.
Carl Johan	Flag unknown	The ship was driven ashore on Callantsoog, North Holland. She was on a voyage from Sunderland, County Durham, United Kingdom to Guam.
Cecile	United States	The ship was destroyed by fire at Boston, Massachusetts. She was on a voyage from Boston to Sagua La Grande, Cuba.
Clymenestra	United Kingdom	The ship was wrecked on Rodrigues. She was on a voyage from Rangoon, Burma to a British port.
Cronberg	Sweden	The ship collided with another vessel and capsized. She was on a voyage from Stockholm to Antwerp, Belgium. She was subsequently righted and taken in to Helsingør, Denmark.
C. T. Tompkins	Canada	The ship was abandoned at sea. She was on a voyage from Saint John, New Brunswick to Cienfuegos, Cuba.
Delphin	Sweden	The schooner was driven ashore on Læsø, Denmark. She was on a voyage from Norrköping to Hartlepool, County Durham. She was refloated on 15 October and towed in to Fredrikshavn, Denmark in a waterlogged condition.
Demarchia	United Kingdom	The ship ran aground in the Swash. She was on a voyage from Bristol to Cardiff.
Dexter Washburn	United States	The schooner was wrecked on the Conch Reef.
Dolphin	Portugal	The schooner was driven ashore at Bridgwater, Somerset, United Kingdom. She was on a voyage from Cardiff to Lisbon.
Dublin	United Kingdom	The steamship ran aground on the Scheehoek, in the North Sea off the Dutch coast. She was on a voyage from Málaga, Spain to Rotterdam. She was refloated on 1 November and resumed her voyage.
Electric	United Kingdom	The full-rigged ship was driven ashore at Rimouski, Quebec. She was on a voyage from Rimouski to London.
Enigheid	Norway	The ship collided with another vessel and sank in the North Sea. Her crew survived.
Eolus	Bremen	The barque sprang a leak and foundered in the Atlantic Ocean with the loss of a crew member. Survivors were rescued nine days later by the barque Dorothy Thompson (United Kingdom). Eolus was on a voyage from Mexico to Bremen.
E. Richardson	United States	The ship was driven ashore in the Dry Tortugas.
Eugene	France	The ship was lost whilst on a voyage from the Îles d'Hyères to Dunkirk, France.
Executive	Flag unknown	The ship was abandoned at sea. She was on a voyage from Bangor to Madeira.
Fannie Gordon	Canada	The ship was driven ashore and wrecked in the Gut of Canso before 21 October. She was on a voyage from Pictou, Nova Scotia to Boston, Massachusetts, United States.
Ferry Hill	United Kingdom	The ship was driven ashore at Arkhangelsk between 2 and 4 October. She was refloated.
Gebroeders Fokkes	United Kingdom	The galiot foundered off the mouth of the Humber. Her crew were rescued by a British lugger.
Gladstone	United Kingdom	The ship ran aground on the Brouwersand before 13 October. She was on a voyage from Samarang, Netherlands East Indies to Rotterdam. She was refloated.
Glengarry	United Kingdom	The ship foundered off Havana before 18 October. Her crew were rescued.
Golden Gleam	United Kingdom	The ship was driven ashore. She was refloated and taken in to Belfast.
Golene Houge	Flag unknown	The ship was wrecked in Algoa Bay.
Governor Marion	United States	The steamship sank off Key West, Florida.
Gratta Strout	Prussia	The ship was driven ashore at Memel.
Great Northern	United Kingdom	The ship ran aground at Renkioi, Ottoman Empire. She was on a voyage from Taganrog, Russia to Falmouth, Cornwall. She was refloated.
Harwich	United Kingdom	The steamship ran aground at Brielle, Netherlands.
Havelock	United Kingdom	The ship was driven ashore in Rhos Bay. She was on a voyage from Holyhead, Anglesey to Port Dinorwic, Caernarfonshire.
Ida Engelsman	Netherlands	The galiot was driven ashore on Farö, Sweden. She was on a voyage from Reval, Russia to Dundee, Forfarshire, United Kingdom. She was refloated and taken in to Slite, Sweden.
Ida Maria	United Kingdom	The ship foundered near Farsund, Norway. Her crew were rescued. She was on a voyage from South Shields, County Durham to Danzig.
Ida Whelan	United States	The schooner was wrecked 4 nautical miles (7.4 km) south of the mouth of the New River, Florida.
Idun	Sweden	The ship was driven ashore. She was on a voyage from Söderhamn to Huelva, Spain. She was refloated and taken in to Ramsgate.
Ina	United Kingdom	The ship sprang a leak and was beached at "Carrack Strand". She was on a voyage from Bombay, India to Liverpool.
Industrie	United Kingdom	The ship was driven ashore at Hartlepool. She was on a voyage from Dover, Kent to Danzig. She was refloated.
Iris	United Kingdom	The brig was driven ashore and wrecked at Ballantrae, Ayrshire. Her crew were rescued. She was on a voyage from Glasgow to Sunderland. Iris was refloated on 12 December and towed in to Ardrossan, Ayrshire by the steamship Flying Meteor (United Kingdom).
Isabella	United Kingdom	The ship was driven ashore on "Tara", County Down. She was later refloated.
Islander	United Kingdom	The ship was driven ashore at Arkhangelsk between 2 and 4 October.
James Brown	United Kingdom	The ship ran aground at Peel, Isle of Man. She was on a voyage from Dublin to Maryport, Cumberland.
Japan	United Kingdom	The barque was wrecked at East Cape, Russia with the loss of nine of her 34 crew. Survivors were rescued by the brig Hattie Jackson (United States).
Jason	United Kingdom	The barque was abandoned in the Gulf of Mexico.
Jessie	Canada	The ship collided with Squire (United Kingdom) and sank at Milford Haven, Pembrokeshire, United Kingdom.
Jesus	Spain	The barque was wrecked in the Cymyran Strait, Anglesey, United Kingdom with the loss of eight of her sixteen crew. She was on a voyage from Manila, Spanish East Indies to Liverpool.
John Crookes	United States	The schooner was wrecked on Cape Florida, Florida. She was on a voyage from Savannah, Georgia to Sagua La Grande.
John Randolph	United States	The schooner was driven onto the Pickles Reef.
Kalervo	(Russian Empire) Grand Duchy of Finland	The ship ran aground on a sunken wreck off Raahe. She was on a voyage from the Clyde to Raahe. She was refloated with the assistance of a steamship.
Key West	United States	The steamship was driven ashore at Cape Hatteras, North Carolina. She was on a voyage from New York to Charleston, South Carolina.
Knapton Hall	United Kingdom	The steamship ran aground on the Vogelsand, in the North Sea. She was on a voyage from Newcastle upon Tyne to Cuxhaven. She was refloated and taken in to Cuxhaven.
Leander	Canada	The ship was wrecked at "Hambro".
Lenoir	(Canada)	The ship was wrecked at "Hambro". She was on a voyage from Glace Bay, Nova Scotia to New York.
Lisa Brindley	United Kingdom	The ship was abandoned at sea before 21 October. Her crew were rescued by the schooner Waterlily (United Kingdom). Lisa Brindley was on a voyage from Lisbon, Portugal to Dublin.
Locomotive	United Kingdom	The brig ran aground at Opobo and was abandoned by her crew. She was on a voyage from Liverpool to Gaboon. The ship was plundered by the local inhabitants and destroyed by an explosion of gunpowder on board with the loss of about 50 lives.
Lord Raglan	United Kingdom	The ship was driven ashore at Arkhangelsk between 2 and 4 October. She was refloated.
Lord Raglan	United Kingdom	The barque sprang a leak and foundered. Her crew were rescued by Marie Louise (Norway). Lord Raglan was on a voyage from the River Tyne to Gothenburg, Sweden.
Lübeck	Lübeck	The steamship was driven ashore at Pärnu, Russia.
Lydia Hilton	United Kingdom	The ship was driven ashore at Arkhangelsk between 2 and 4 October. She was refloated.
Malabar	United Kingdom	The ship was destroyed by fire in the South Atlantic (27°03′S 58°58′W) before 12 October.
Maria Adriana	Netherlands	The ship collided with HMS Scorpion (Royal Navy) and sank at Brouwershaven, Zeeland.
Marmion	United Kingdom	The Mersey Flat ran aground on the East Hoyle Bank, in Liverpool Bay. She was refloated.
Mary Richmond	United Kingdom	The ship ran aground in the River Foyle and was damaged. She was on a voyage from Riga, Russia to Londonderry.
Mary Tatham	United Kingdom	The ship was driven ashore on Eilean Sionnach, Inner Hebrides. She was on a voyage from Newcastle upon Tyne to Rathmelton, County Donegal. She was later refloated.
Mercurius	Stettin	The steamship was driven ashore on Öland, Sweden. She was on a voyage from Stettin to a Norwegian port.
M. N.	Spain	The brig was lost at "Varadera" with the loss of six of her thirteen crew. She was on a voyage from Cárdenas, Cuba to Falmouth.
Moreno	(Spain) Cuba	The ship was driven ashore and wrecked at the Jupiter Inlet Lighthouse. She was on a voyage from Caibarién to Sydney, New South Wales.
Neptune	United Kingdom	The steamship ran aground on the Vogelsand, in the North Sea.
Neptune	United Kingdom	The smack sank in Ramsey Sound.
Nora	United Kingdom	The steamship was driven ashore at "Storedam". She was refloated and taken in to Texel.
Northampton	United Kingdom	The ship ran aground at Shanghai, China.
Olive	United Kingdom	The ship was wrecked in "Diersey Sound".
Ottawa	Canada	The ship was wrecked on Long Island, New York. She was on a voyage from Cow Bay, Nova Scotia to New York City.
Pacific	United Kingdom	The steamship ran aground near Brielle. She was refloated.
Paluca San José	Spain	The schooner was wrecked on the Pickles Reef.
Pepita	Spain	The barque was wrecked at Matanzas, Cuba.
Plato	United Kingdom	The steamship foundered in the Bay of Biscay between 17 and 21 October with the loss of all hands. She was on a voyage from Hull, Yorkshire to Trieste.
Pleiades	United Kingdom	The ship was abandoned at sea. She was on a voyage from Santa Anna to Falmouth.
Prussian	United Kingdom	The steamship ran aground on Tuns Bank, in Lough Foyle. She was refloated.
Queen of the Isles	United Kingdom	The ship was driven ashore at "Assis".
Quixote	Spain	The ship was lost neat Santa Anna.
Regina	United Kingdom	The ship was wrecked on the Zapodilla Cays. She was on a voyage from Newport to Puerto Caballos, British Honduras.
Regina	United Kingdom	The ship was driven ashore at Arkhangelsk between 2 and 4 October. She was refloated.
Richmond	United Kingdom	The ship was driven ashore and wrecked in the "Clure River".
Right Bower	United States	The schooner was driven onto the Pickles Reef.
Rosedale	United Kingdom	The barque was wrecked at Matanzas.
Sarah	United Kingdom	The smack was driven ashore in County Antrim. She was on a voyage from Peterhead, Aberdeenshire to Belfast.
Sars Johan	Sweden	The ship ran aground at Norrtälje. She was on a voyage from Norrtälje to Hull. She was refloated.
Sharon	United States	The ship was wrecked at Jeddore, Nova Scotia, Canada. She was on a voyage from Portland, Maine to Port Caledonia, Nova Scotia.
Sicilia	Flag unknown	The brig sank at Matanzas.
Skjold	Denmark	The barque was wrecked at Arkhangelsk.
Stately	United Kingdom	The barque was wrecked on Neckman's Ground, in the Baltic Sea. Her crew were rescued. She was on a voyage from Kronstadt, Russia to Helsingør, Denmark.
Stirling	Norway	The barque was wrecked at "Caissaid". She was on a voyage from Hamburg to Pernambuco, Brazil.
St. Marys	United Kingdom	The ship was abandoned at sea.
St. Mitrofane	Russia	The lighter ran aground and was wrecked at Taganrog.
St.Nicolas	Russia	The lighter was loss at Taganrog.
Stranger	United Kingdom	The ship was driven ashore and wrecked on the coast of California.
Sultan	United Kingdom	The barque was wrecked on the coast of Luzon, Spanish East Indies. She was on a voyage from Hong Kong to Borneo.
Thomas and William	United Kingdom	The ship was wrecked off the Faroe Islands. Her crew were rescued by the fishing smack Olive (United Kingdom).
Tomas de Resa	Spain	The barque was wrecked near Key West, Florida, United States. Her crew were rescued. She was on a voyage from New Orleans to Barcelona.
Valetta	United Kingdom	The ship was lost north of the mouth of the Rio Grande with the loss of two of her crew. She was on a voyage from Liverpool to Montevideo, Uruguay.
Victoria	United Kingdom	The ship was driven ashore between Crosby and Waterloo, Lancashire.
Wandsworth	United Kingdom	The ship caught fire and was beached at Louisbourg, Nova Scotia. She was on a voyage from an English port to Quebec City.
William Brown	United Kingdom	The barque was wrecked near Havana before 18 October with the loss of a crew member.
William Rathbone	United States	The barque was wrecked in the Hillsboro Inlet. Four of her crew were rescued by Mississippi (United States). William Rathbone was on a voyage from New York to New Orleans.
Zanzibar	France	The barque was wrecked at Ibo, Mozambique. She was on a voyage from Marseille to Ibo.
Zibiah	United Kingdom	The ship was wrecked at Arichat, Nova Scotia, Canada. She was on a voyage from Rio de Janeiro, Brazil to Gaspé, Quebec, Canada.
Unnamed	French Navy	Franco-Prussian War: The man-of-war ran aground on the Cross Sand, in the North Sea off the coast of Norfolk whilst pursuing a Prussian merchant vessel. She was refloated.
