= Kulla Gunnarstorp mill =

Coordinates: 56°06′12″N 12°38′17″E

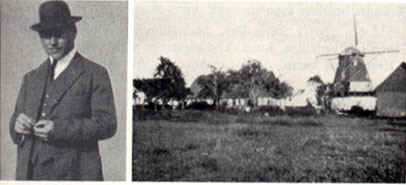
The last miller Nils Persson who closed the mill in 1950, but lived at the farm until his death in 1972.

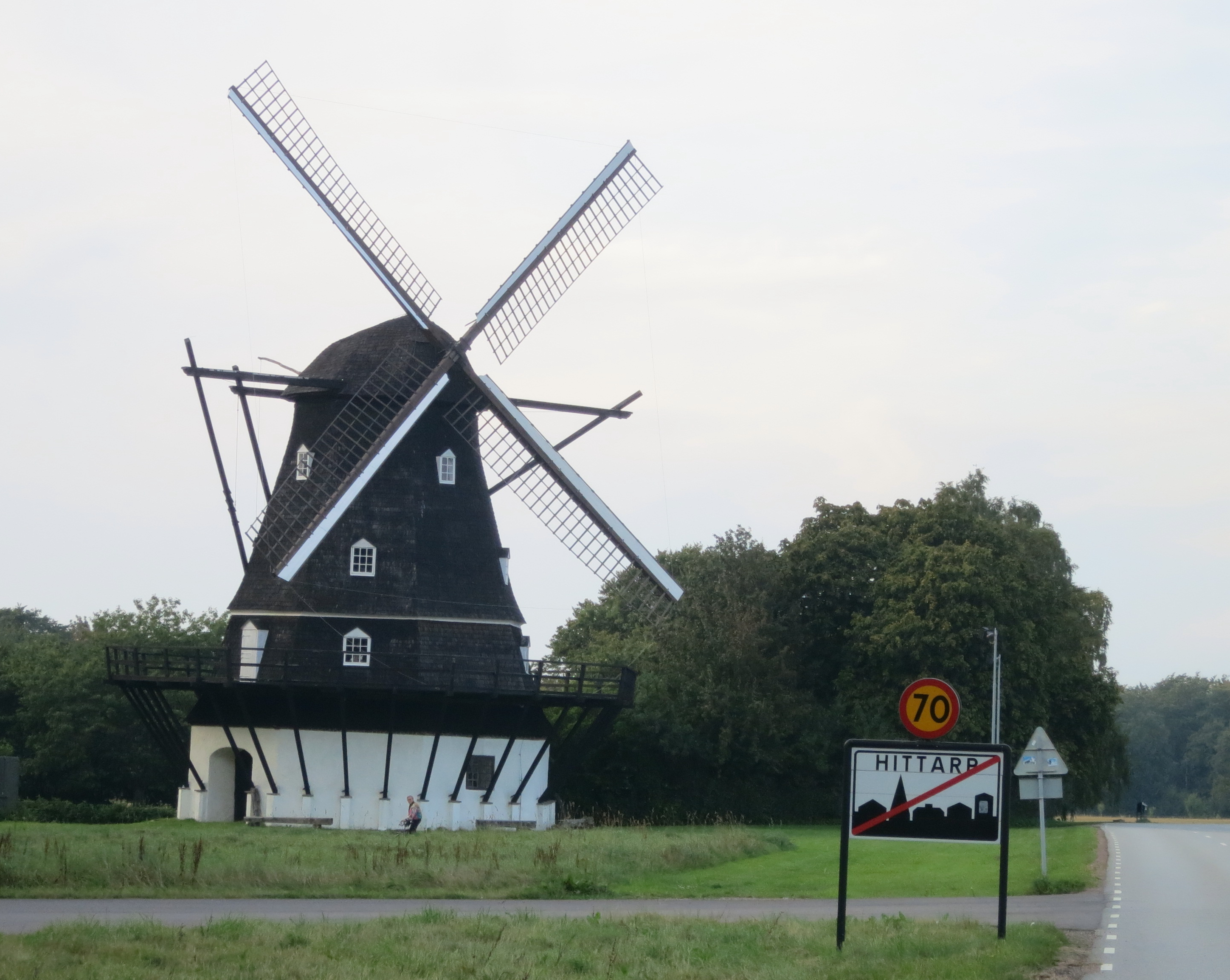
Kulla Gunnarstorp mill.

The Kulla Gunnarstorp mill is a Scanian historical landmark north of Helsingborg, Sweden, in the suburb of Hittarp. It is a smock mill with a boat-shaped cap, which is unique in Scania.

== History ==
The count or the countess at Kulla Gunnarstorp Castle hired the miller, and let him and his family live at the mill farm. The last miller was Nils Persson, who closed the mill in 1950 after working there since 1922, but he was allowed to live there with his family until his death in 1972.
