= Kulla Gunnarstorp Castle =

Castle in Helsingborg Municipality, Sweden

- Kulla Gunnarstorps slott
- Helsingborg Municipality
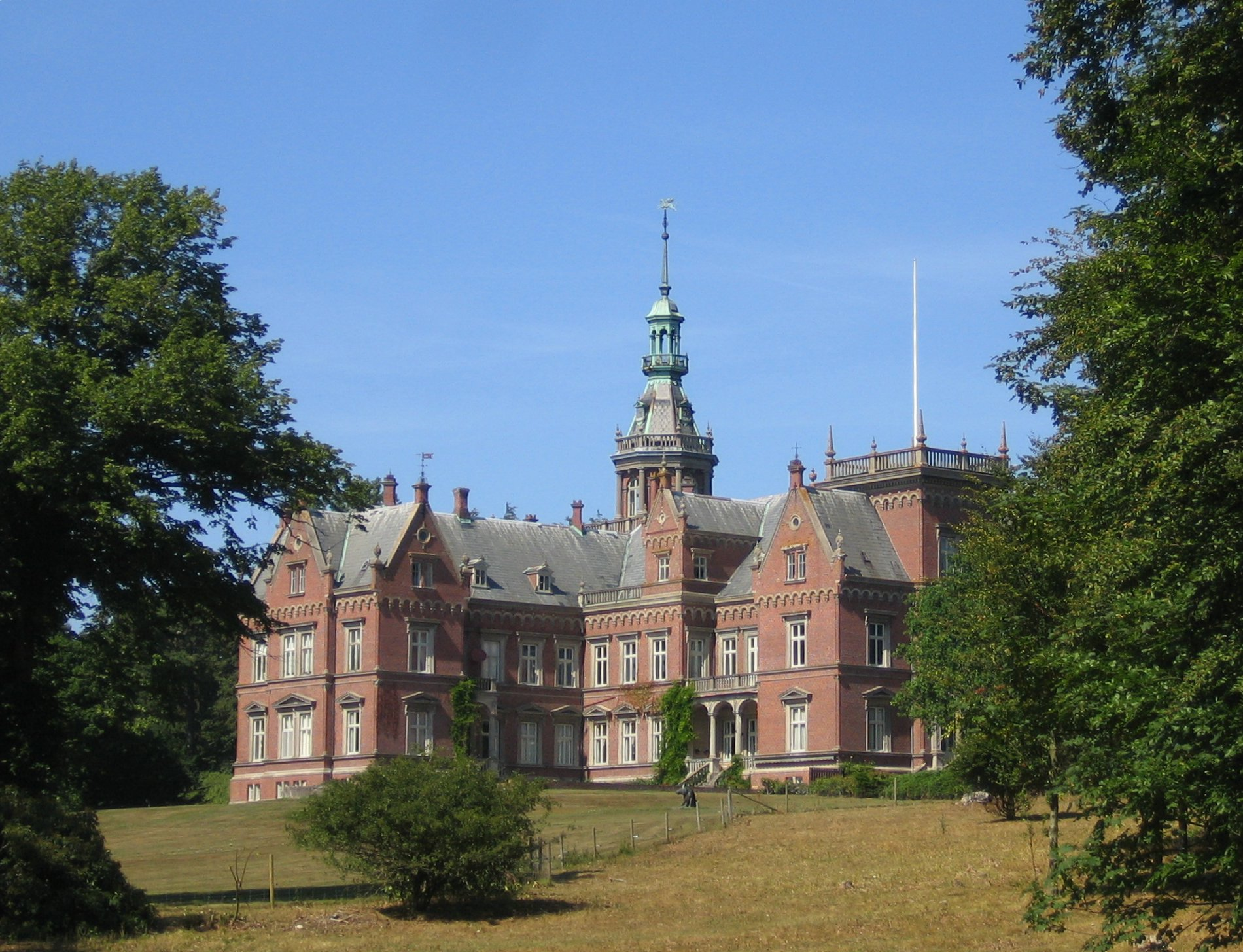
- Kulla Gunnarstorp Castle

Site information
- Type: Castle
- Open to the public: No

Location
- Scania, Sweden
- Coordinates: 56.1092°N 12.6295°E

Kulla Gunnarstorp Castle (Swedish: Kulla Gunnarstorps slott) is a castle in Helsingborg Municipality, Scania, in southern Sweden. Kulla Gunnarstorp is located near the Öresund between the villages Hittarp and Domsten, about 10 kilometers north of Helsingborg.

== History ==
The property actually contains two castles on its grounds; the old castle was built in the 16th century by Skåne nobleman Jørgen Ottesen Brahe (1554-1601). In the 19th century a new one was built by Swedish Foreign Minister Baltzar von Platen (1804-1875).

The old castle, originally called Gundestrup around 1500, once belonged to the family Parsberg. It passed in the mid-1500s to the Privy council member Jörgen Brahe through marriage. He built the old castle, which still exists on the estate. The castle was bought in 1639 by Axel Eriksen Rosenkrantz of Glimmingehus and in 1775 it was sold to Count Gustaf Adolf Sparre, who built up a fine collection of paintings there. After his widow's death it passed to their grandson Gustav Adolf Frederick De la Gardie, and after his death, to his son Jacob de la Gardie. He sold the estate with its collection in 1837 to Carl De Geer of Leufsta. After Count De Geer's death in 1861 his son Baltzar von Platen (1804-1875) inherited it, who built the new castle, designed by Danish architect Christian Zwingmann (1827 -1891). Then the estate passed to his daughter Elisabeth von Platen, who married Axel Wachtmeister and later lived at Wanås Castle in Östra Göinge. The property remained in the Wachtmeister family name until 1978, when the current owner Gustav Trolle inherited the estate from his mother, Charlotte (née Wachtmeister).

Kulla Gunnarstorp has traditionally supported Allerums Church (Allerums Kyrka), as the estate is located in the Allerum parish, although Vikens Church (Vikens kyrka) also has occasionally received patronage.

The Kulla Gunnarstorp mill is also a historical landmark outside Hittarp.

== See also ==
- List of castles in Sweden
