= Brigitta Sahlgren =

Swedish businessperson

- Born: Brigitta Ekmarck; 1694
- Died: 12 May 1771 (aged 76–77); Gothenburg, Sweden
- Occupation: Businesswoman
- Known for: Managing director of the Sahlgrenska sockerbruket (1736–1771)
- Spouse: Jacob Sahlgren (m. 1715; died 1736)
- Relatives: Niclas Sahlgren (brother-in-law); Gustaf Adolf Sparre (grandson)

Brigitta Sahlgren (née Ekmarck; 1694 – 12 May 1771) was a Swedish businessperson. She was the managing director of the Sahlgrenska sockerbruket ("Sahlgren Sugar Refinery") in 1736–1771 and a trade- and shipping company in 1736–1744.

== Life ==
Sahlgren was the daughter of the merchant Olof Pehrsson Ekmarck and Christina Stillman and married in 1715 to merchant Jacob Sahlgren, who founded the first sugar refinery in Sweden, Sahlgrenska sockerbruket, in 1729, which became one of the greatest businesses in Gothenburg.

She took over the refinery, as well as the trade- and shipping company which was also owned by her spouse, when she was widowed in 1736. Sahlgren had a monopoly upon the sugar industry in Sweden. When another merchant applied for permission to found a new one in 1740, she sued him before the government and won after a two-year legal battle. She was represented in court by her son-in-law Count Sparre and her brother-in-law Niclas Sahlgren. However, as she did not manage to increase the sugar production to meet the growing demand (which had been the condition of the government demanded of her in exchange for respecting the monopoly of 1729) Nicolas Jacobson was in 1749, after a new legal battle, allowed to open a second sugar refinery in Gothenburg. The Sahlgrenska sockerbruket kept a leading role in the sugar industry nonetheless.

Sahlgren died on 12 May 1771, in Gothenburg.

== Family ==
Sahlgren had one son, Olaf (died 1758), one daughter, Sara Christina Sahlgren (1723–1766) who married Count Rutger Axel Sparre, and was succeeded after her death by her grandsons; Jacob Sahlgren and Count Gustaf Adolf Sparre.

== Gallery ==
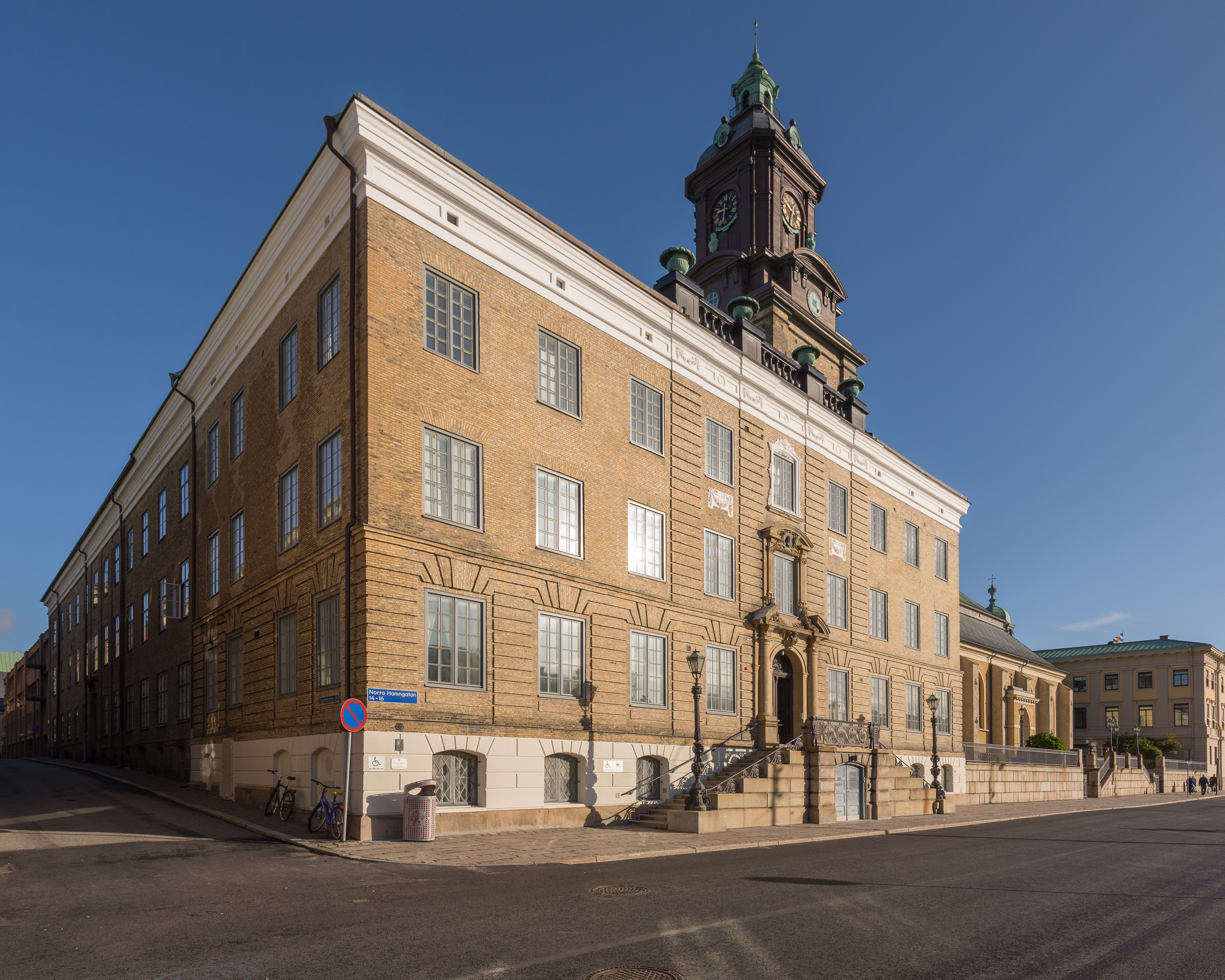
Sahlgrenska house in Gothebourg that she had built in 1753

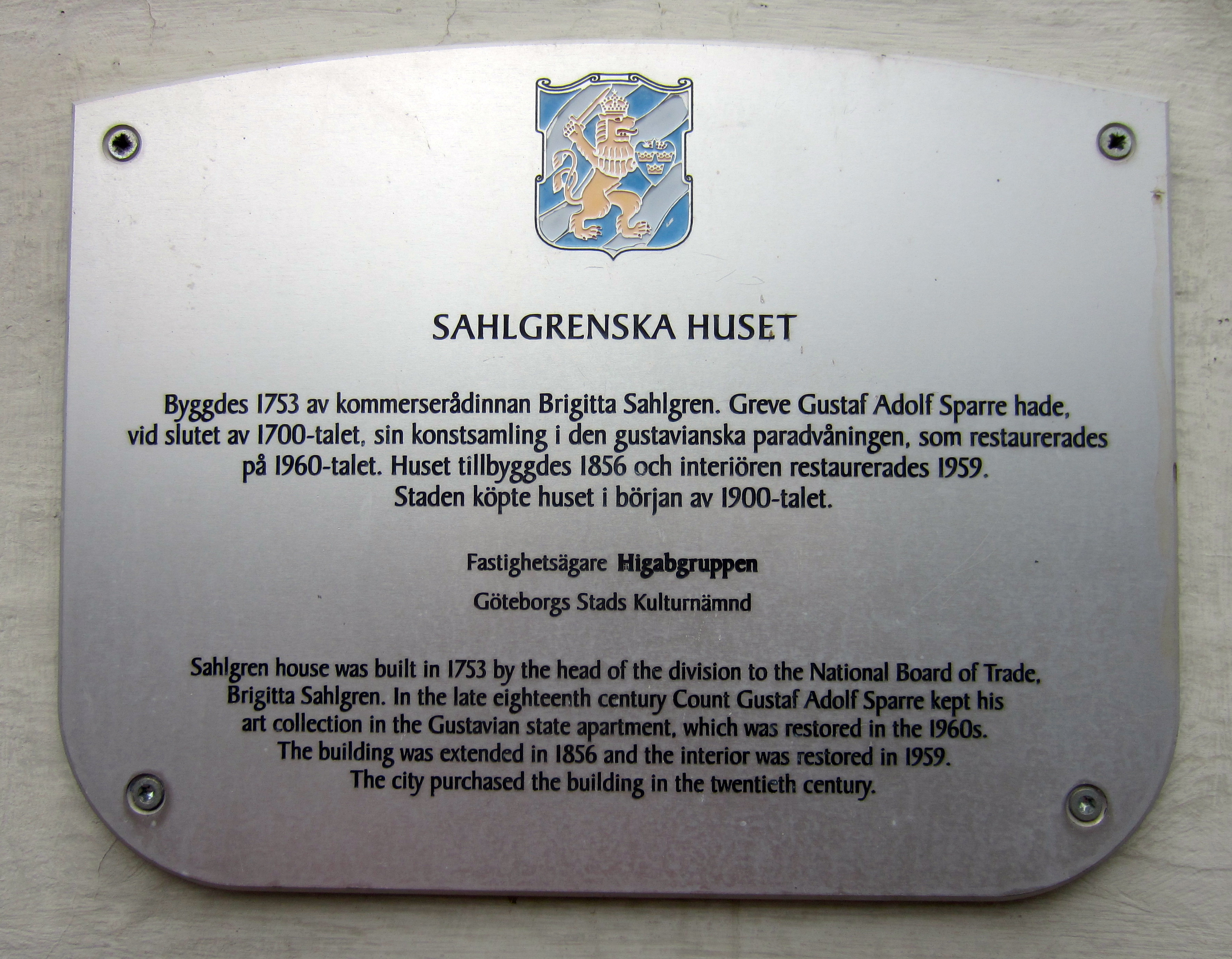
Commemorative plaque mentioning her as "head of the division to the National Board of Trade"

== See also ==
- Margaretha Donner
