= Gustaf Adolf Sparre =

Swedish art collector

Count Gustaf Adolf Sparre
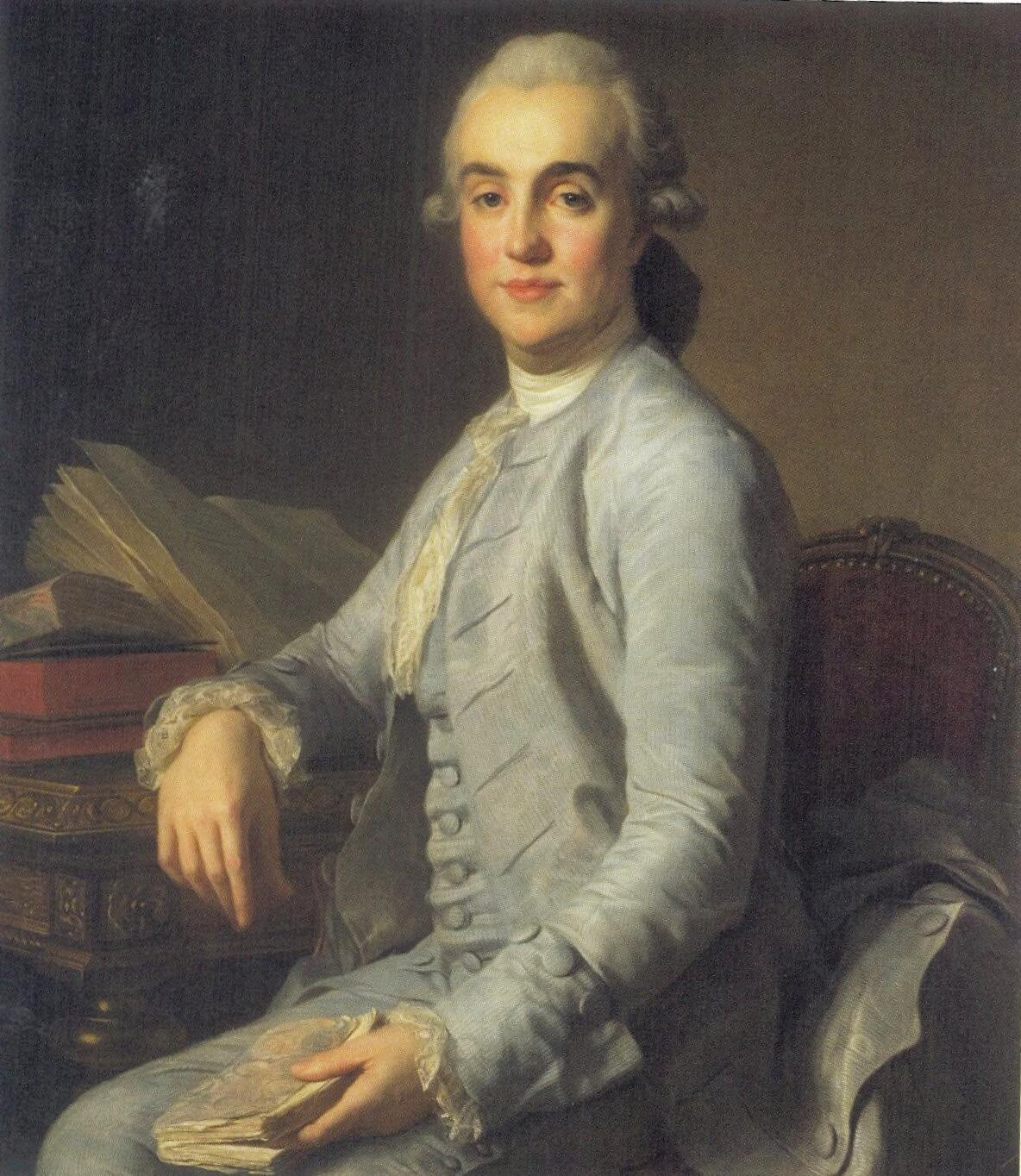
- Portrait of Gustaf Adolf Sparre, by Alexander Roslin
- Born: 6 January 1746; Gothenburg
- Died: 18 June 1794 (aged 48); Kulla Gunnarstorp Castle

Count Gustaf Adolf Sparre (6 January 1746 – 18 June 1794) was a Swedish art collector. He travelled widely through Europe, collecting mostly Flemish and Dutch cabinet paintings. His collection of over 100 paintings is special because it remained largely intact for over two centuries.

== Biography ==
Sparre was born on 6 January 1746, in Gothenburg. He was the wealthy son of the Marshal of the Court and the director of the Swedish East India Company (SOIC), Count Rutger Axel Sparre, and Sara Christina Sahlgren (1723–1766). His maternal great-uncle Niclas Sahlgren had been a founder of the SOIC. Gustaf Adolf Sparre studied as a teenager at Lund and Uppsala University and spent the years 1768–1771 making a Grand Tour abroad, visiting Britain, the Netherlands, France and Germany. It was during these early travels that he began buying art. On his return he started work in his mother's family business that had been built up by her mother Brigitta Sahlgren and moved into the Sahlgrenska house named after her in Gothenburg, situated next to the SOIC headquarters. It was here where he first installed his art collection in the Gustavian floor. One of the original cabinet paintings in its Gustavian Sparre frame, gifted to the city of Gothenburg in 1981 by the Wachtmeister family trust, was hung in the Blue room of the newly restored Gustavian floor.

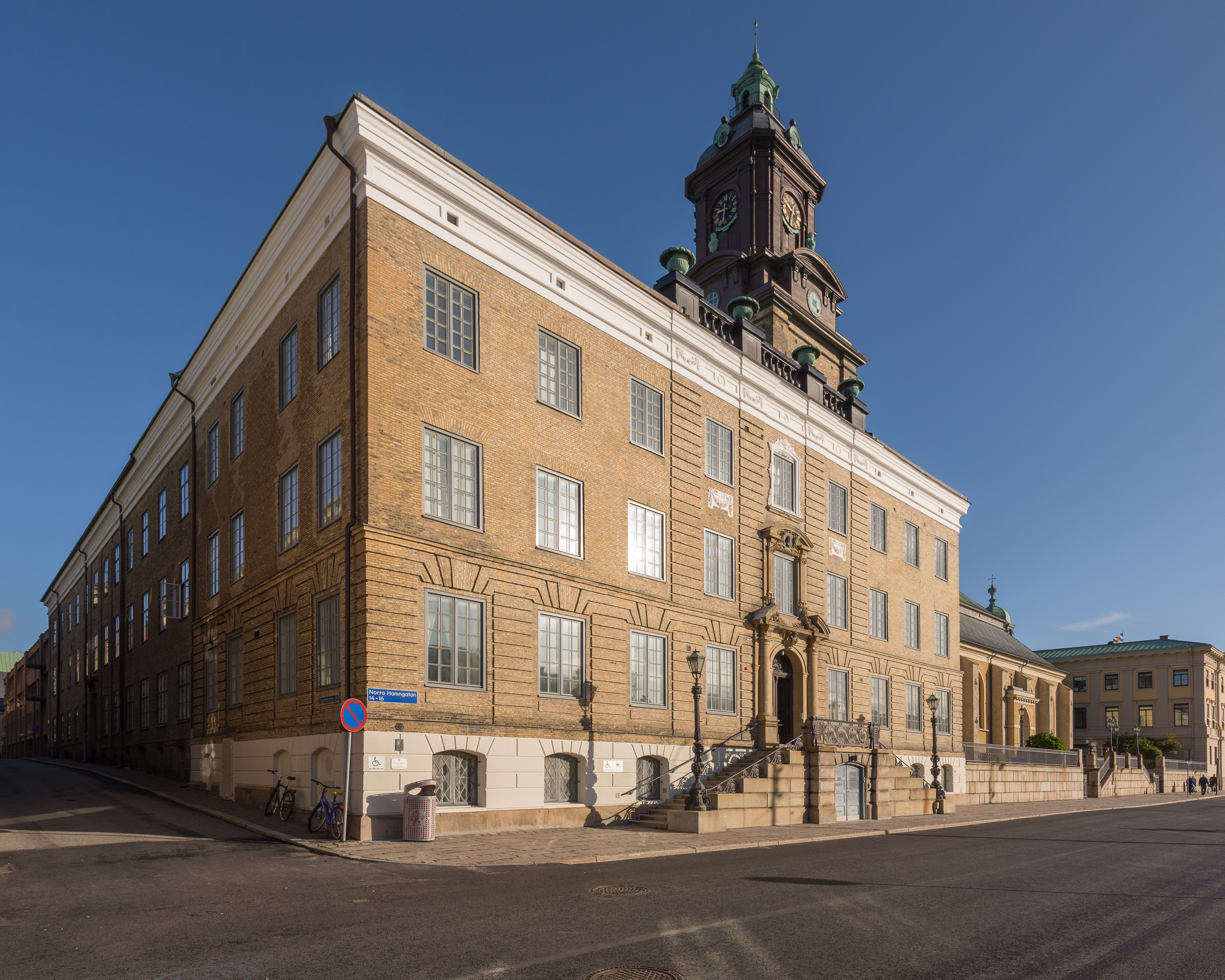
Sahlgrenska house

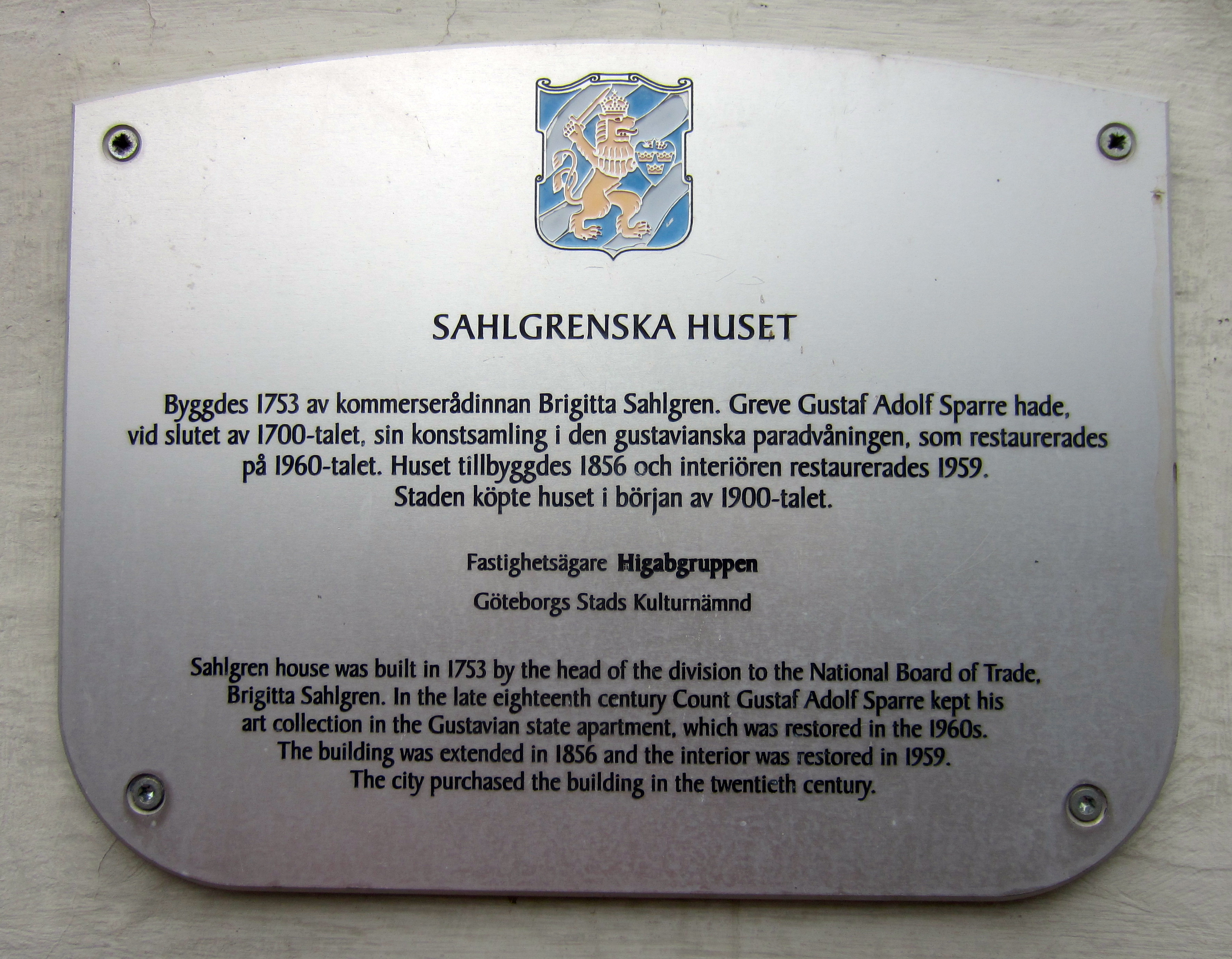
Commemorative plaque mentioning the collection

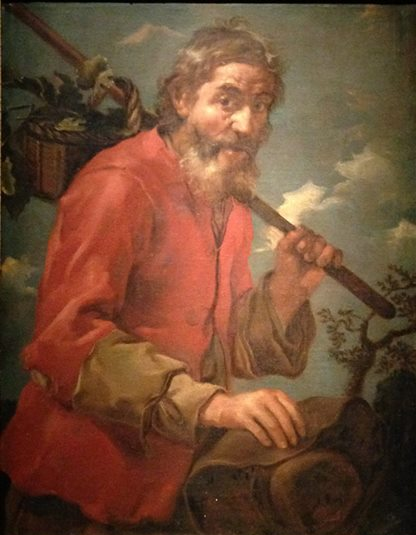
Vineyard Worker, by Bernhard Keil

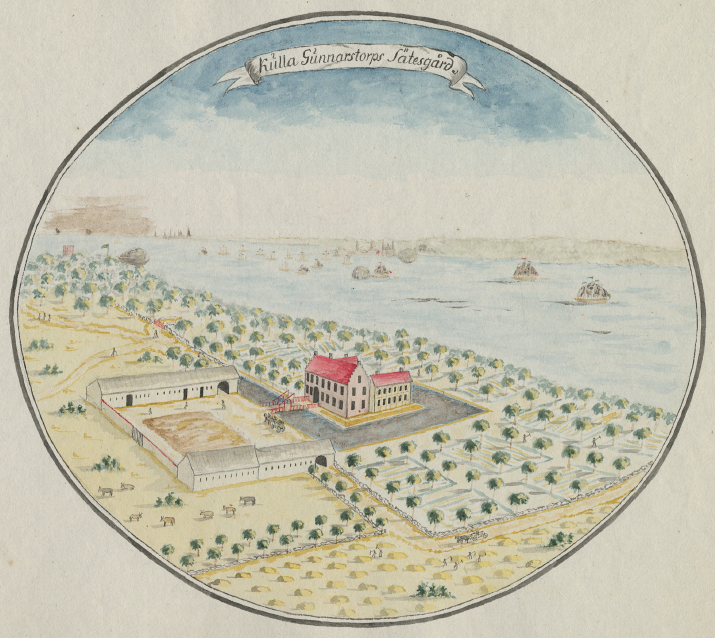
Kulla Gunnarstorp Castle, circa 1780

In 1775 he bought Kulla Gunnarstorp Castle outside Helsingborg, where he moved a large part of the art collection. He was married in 1777 to Elizabeth Sophia Amalia Beata Ramel (1753–1830), daughter of Baron Hans Ramel (1724–1799) and Amalia Beata Lewenhaupt (1726–1810). Their daughter Christina Sparre married Jacob de la Gardie.

Sparre died on 18 June 1794, at Kulla Gunnarstorp Castle.

== Art collection ==
When Gustaf Adolf Sparre died, his collection was documented in the estate inventory and this 1794 inventory was inherited by his wife, and later his daughter Christina.

When the remainder of the painting collection was finally sold in 2007, many of the frames that had been ordered by Sparre in 1775 for his initial gallery in Sahgrenska house were still intact, making the match to the original estate inventory considerably easier. These frames were probably all made by the same framemakers, and possibly included the sculptor G. J. Fast, who made the Gustavian floor’s mirror frames and panelling. The frames tend to be of three basic types, which are assumed to be associated with the three rooms of the original Sahlgrenska gallery. Count Sparre continued to make trips to Europe after he created the gallery, and he purchased three of his cabinet paintings at the estate sale of Antoine Poullain in Paris in 1780:

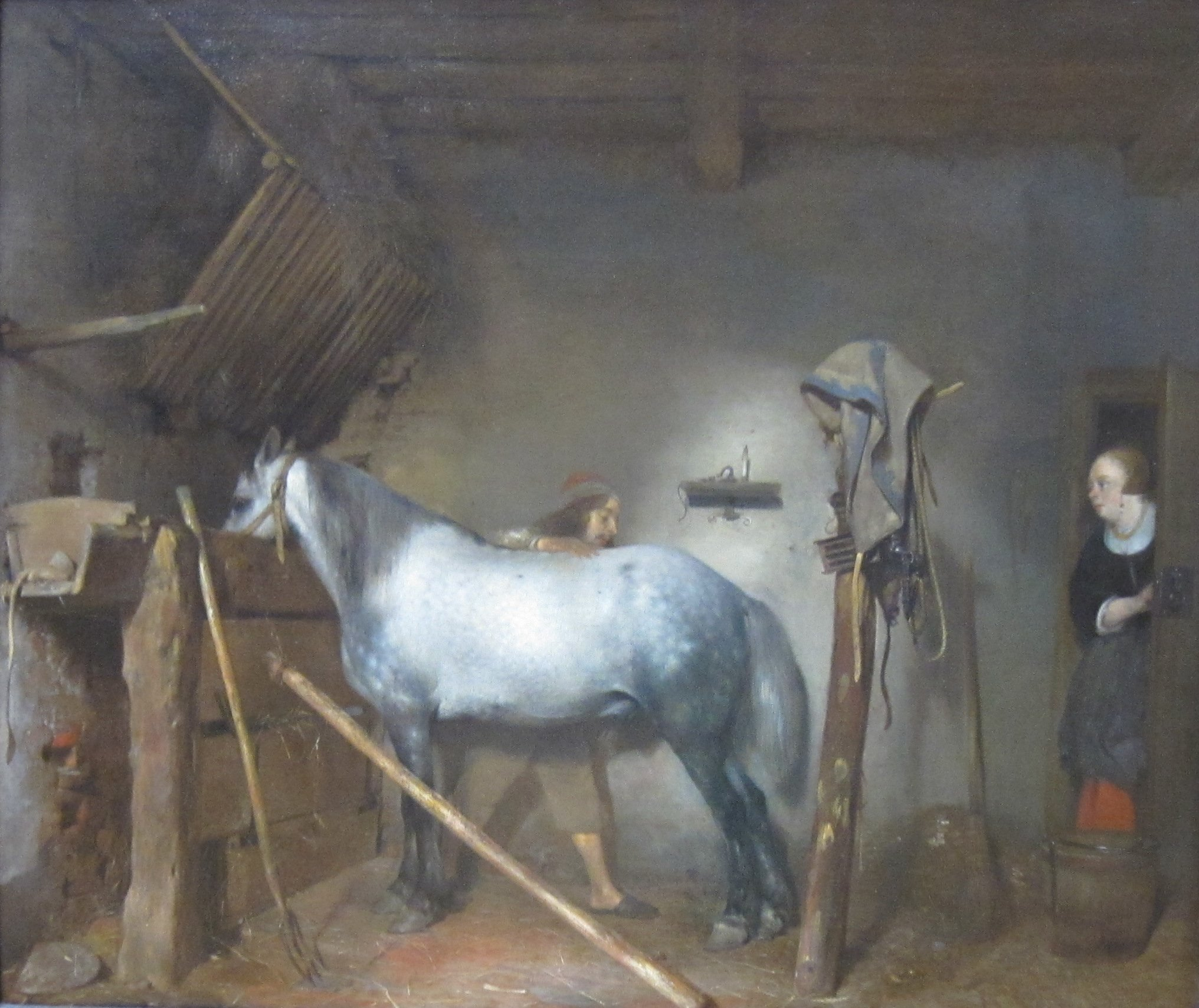
Horse Stable, by Gerard ter Borch (which he may have seen earlier when it was in the collection of Louis François, Prince of Conti

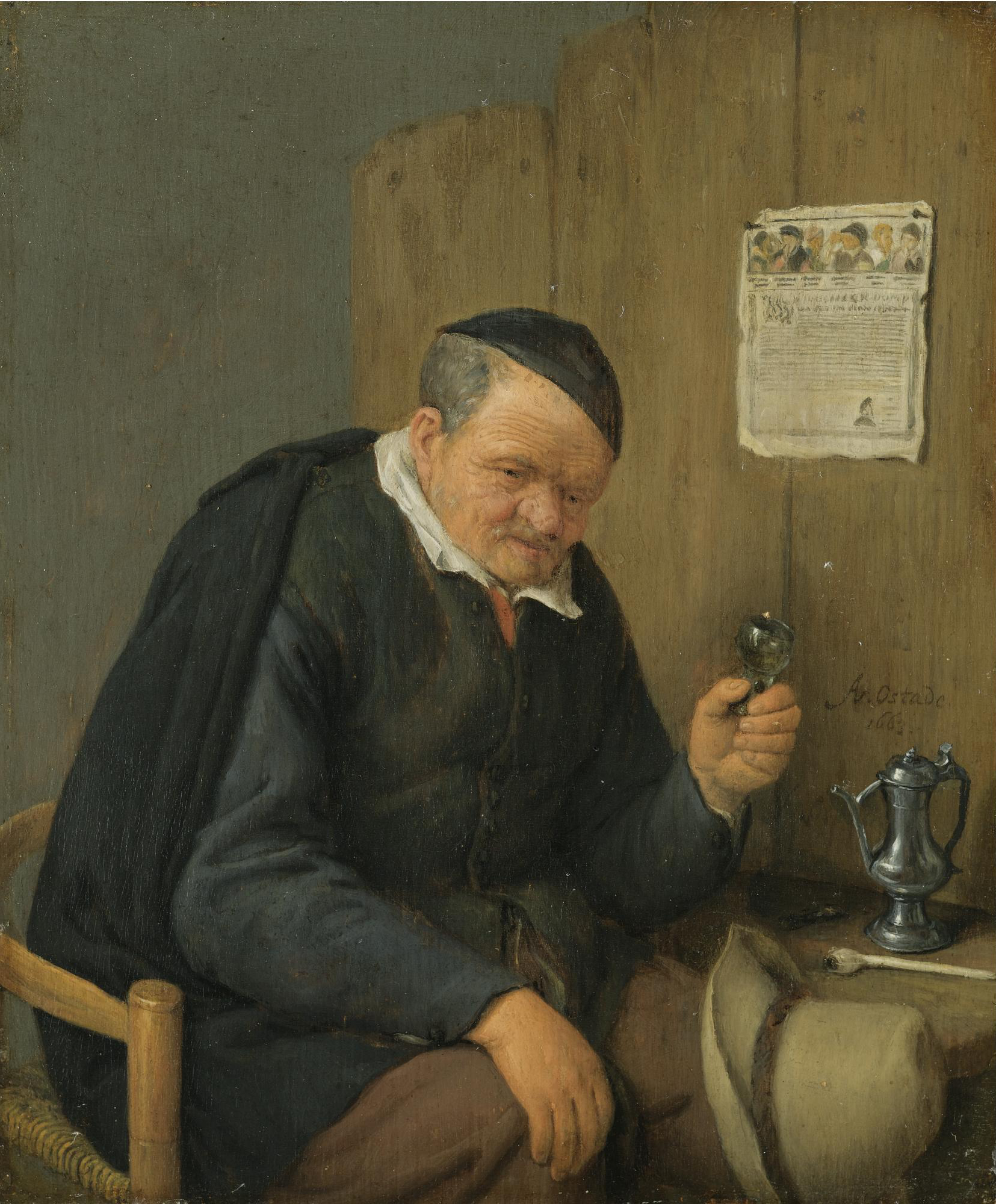
Old Man with a Wine Glass, by Adriaen van Ostade

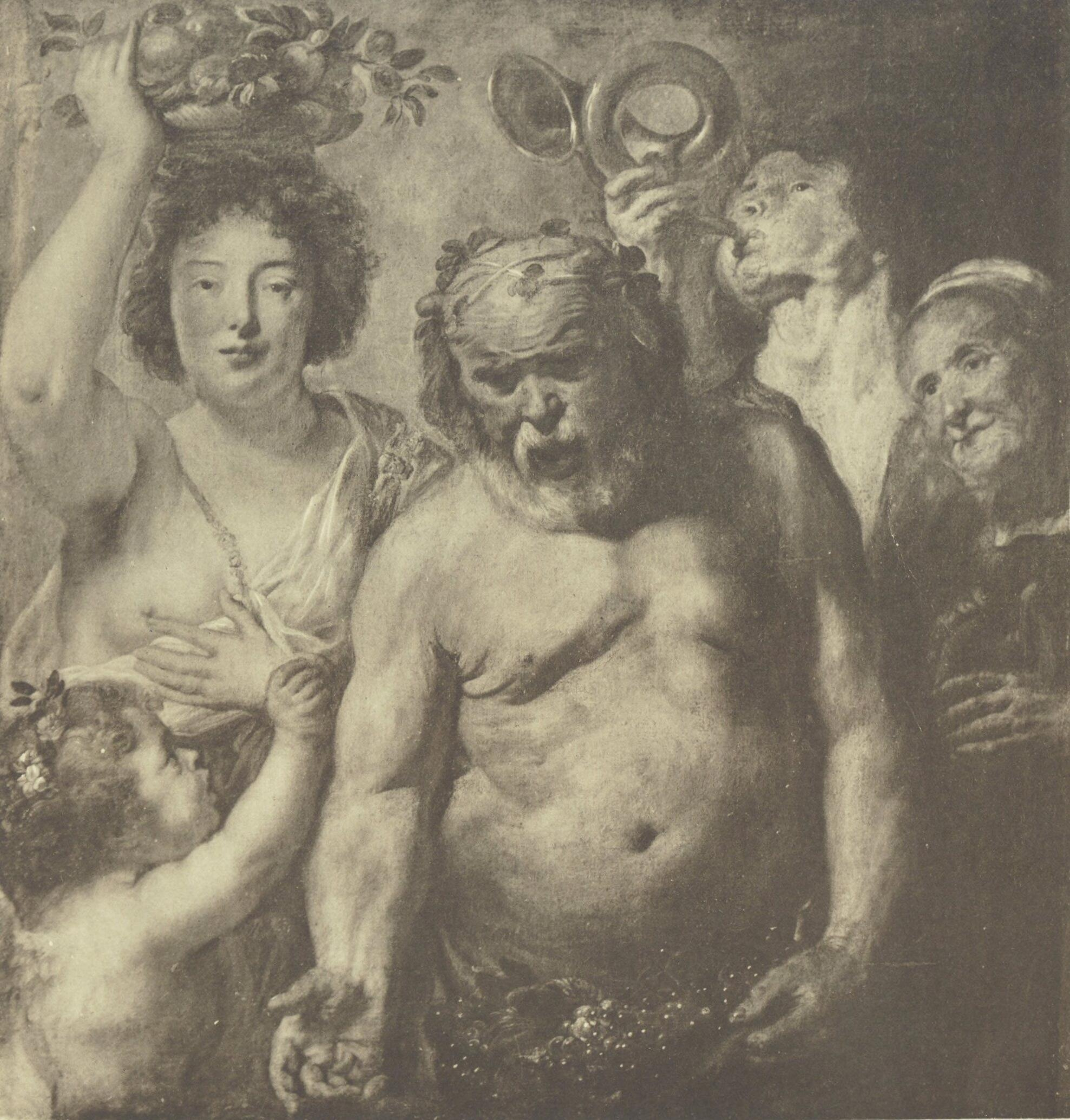
Silenus, by Jacob Jordaens (which he may have seen earlier when it was in the collection of Paul Randon de Boisset)

When Count Sparre's only surviving grandchild died without issue, his grandson-in-law sold Kulla Gunnarstorp Castle with its contents (including the cabinet paintings) to Carl de Geer in 1837. His granddaughter Elisabeth Wachtmeister-von Platen in turn set up a Wachtmeister family trust to hold the paintings, and she had the art historian Georg Göthe make an inventory in 1895. During the course of the 20th-century, her descendants slowly began to sell off various pieces, and in December 2007 Sotheby's sold a major group of them.

In 2013 the Nationalmuseum purchased three of the paintings for their collection:

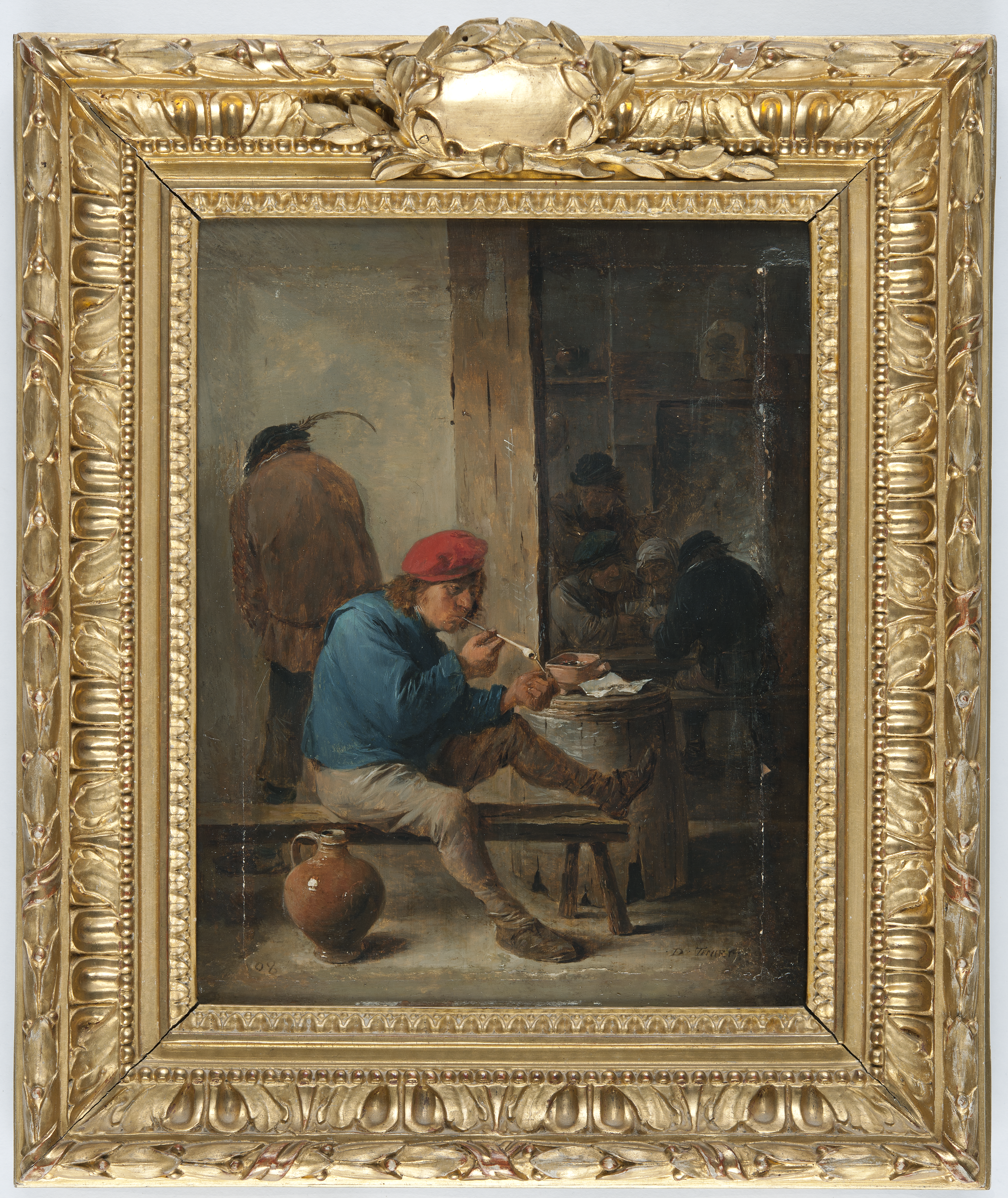
Tavern Scene with Smokers, by David Teniers the Younger

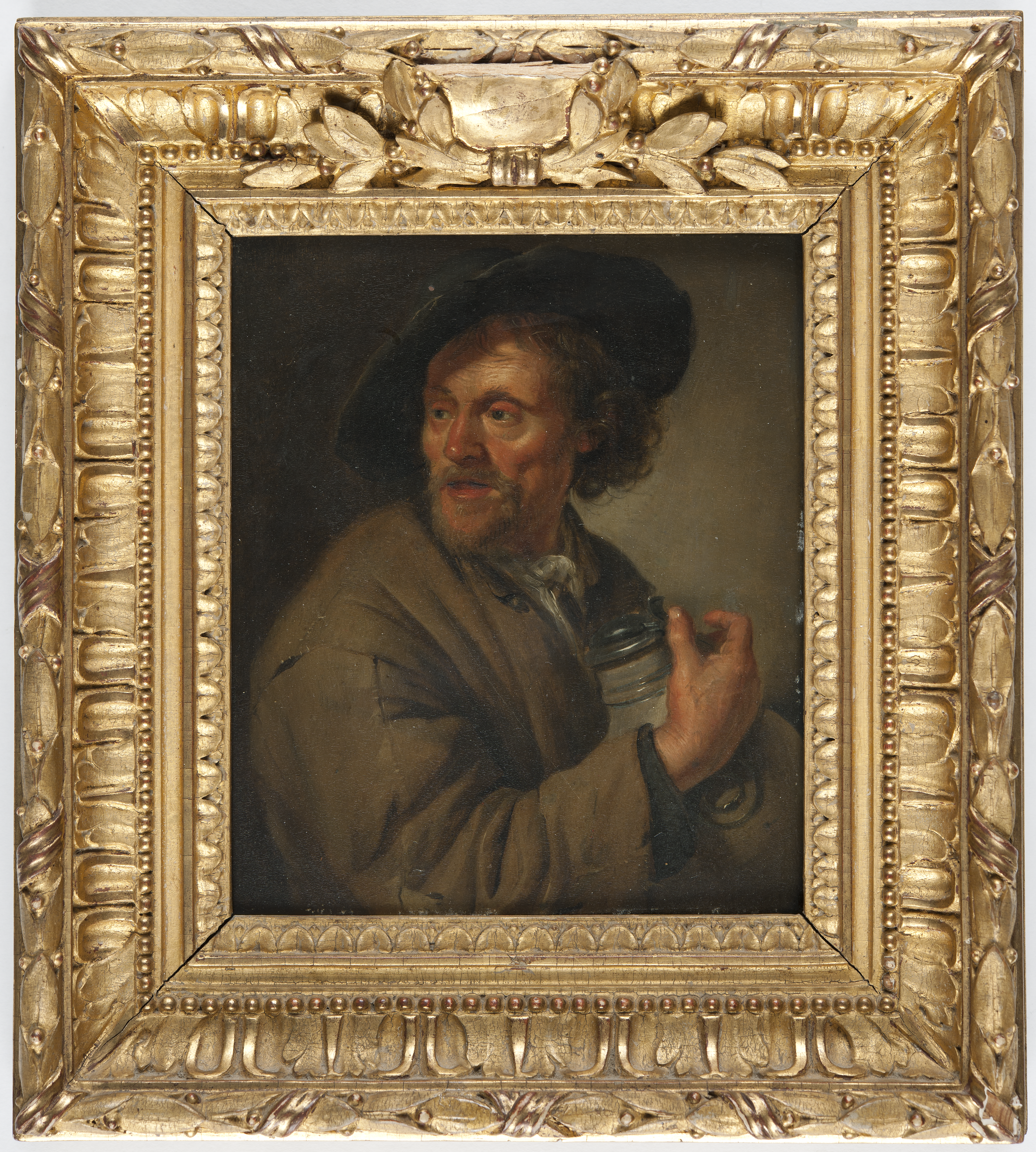
Man Holding a jug by Jacob Toorenvliet

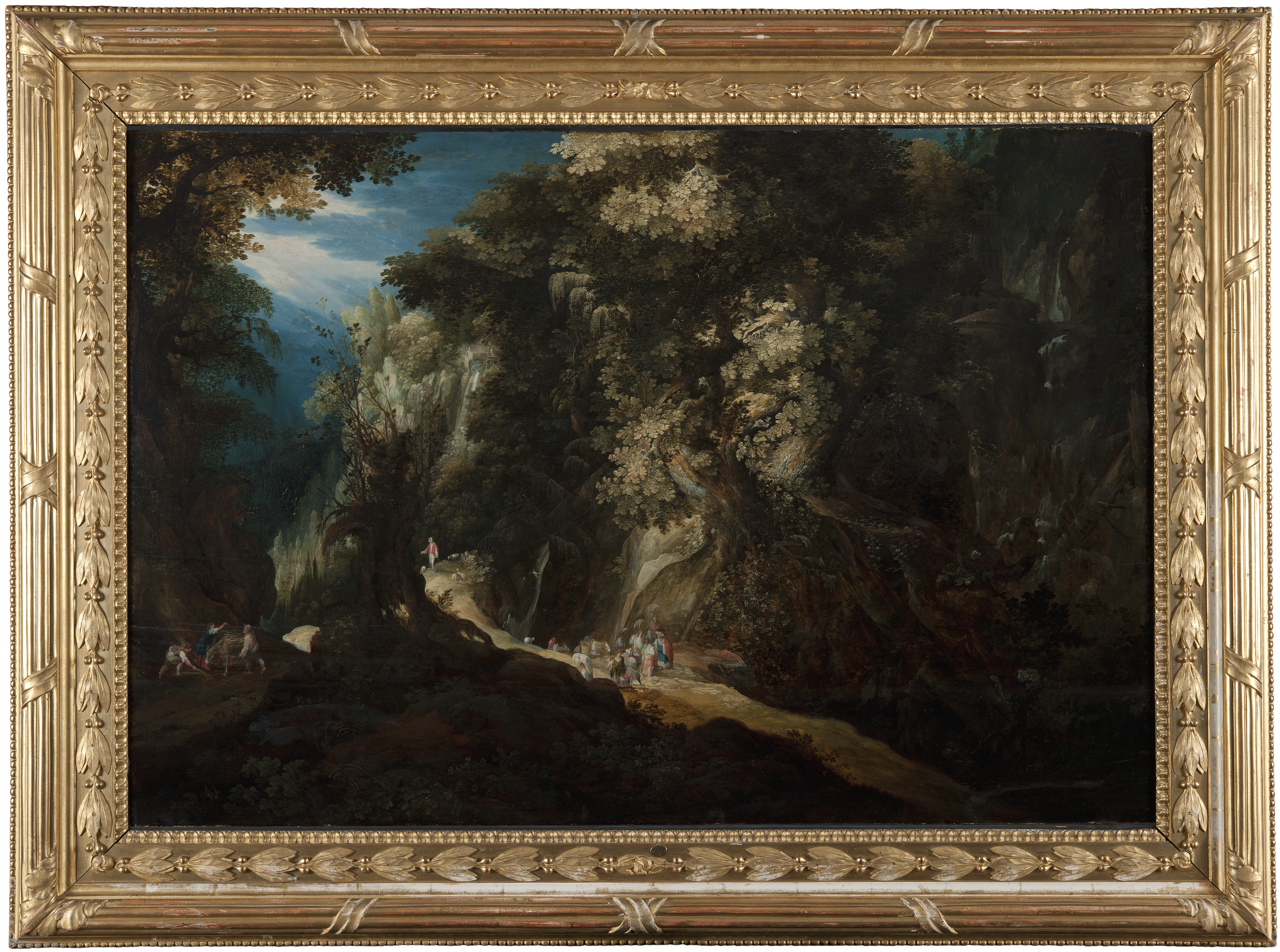
Wooded Mountain Landscape with Waterfall and Travellers by Gysbrecht Leytens

== Collection inventories ==
- Estate inventory Count Gustaf Adolf Sparre, 1794
- Olof Granberg, Inventory of 500 paintings in Swedish private collections, 1886
- Georg Göthe, Tafvelsamlingen på Wanås, Stockholm, 1895
- Sotheby's London sale of Wachtmeister paintings, 5 December 2007
