= Creaden Head =

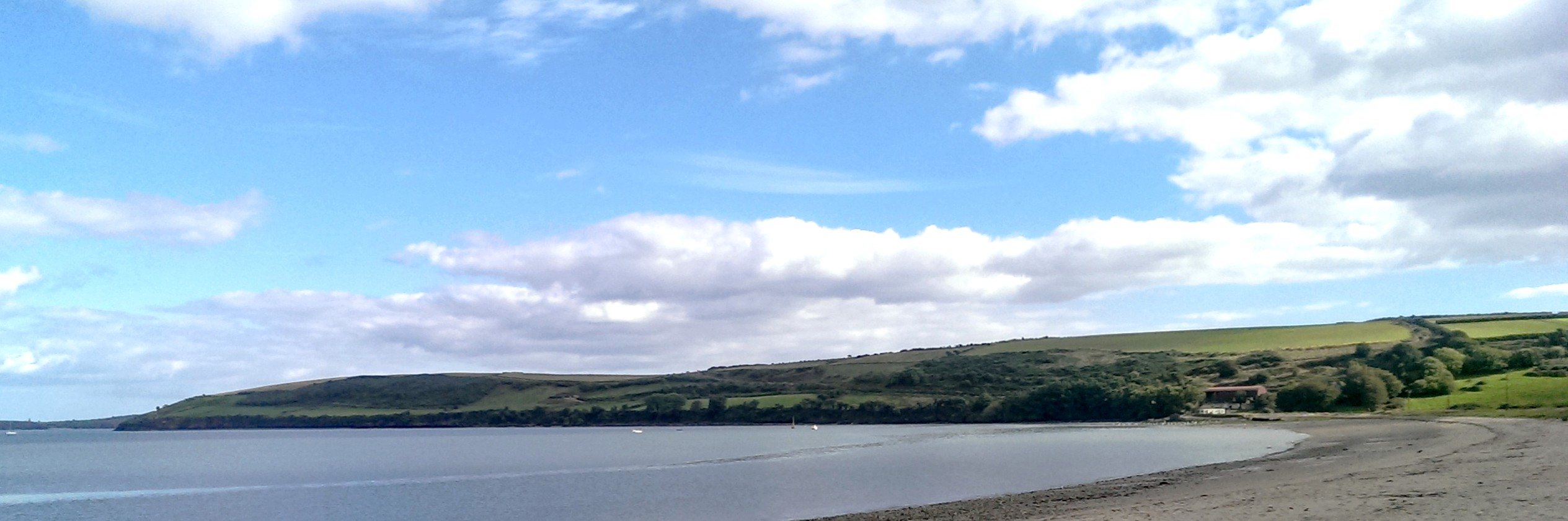
Creaden Head on the River Suir in Waterford Estuary

Creadan Head (Irish: Ceann Chréadáin) is a headland on a small peninsula on the west side of Waterford Harbour, about three miles upriver from Dunmore East, in County Waterford, Ireland.

Of uncertain meaning and presumed to be an individual's name, it is the most easterly point in County Waterford. Historically, it was part of the "main road" from Cork to London. A ferry crossing from the headland to Templetown on the eastern side of the bay was operated by the Knights Templar. Forty hand-hewn steps, leading down to sea-level, are still evident in the rocks at the headland. It is thought that these steps were also very useful to maritime pilots since the headland is an obvious embarkation and disembarkation point.

== Smuggling ==
Creadan Head was apparently used as a landing stage for certain goods from ships heading upriver to Waterford, New Ross, Granny and other small ports. Items thus landed were not assessed for taxes and other dues, in other words they were being smuggled. Creadan House is situated at the start of the headland, overlooking a sheltered cove, Creadan Cove or Walls Cove. This cove was also used for landing goods.

North of the headland is a sandbar which narrows the navigable channel to the Port of Waterford. This river channel is buoyed from Creaden Head to mark the navigation.

== Slavery ==
At the base of the peninsula, on the north side, is located a beach or strand known locally as Fornaght Strand or Knockaveelish Strand. The Irish language name is "Trá na Mná Gorm"; translated directly to English as "The Strand of the Blue Women", which means; "The Strand of the Negro Women". This would appear to support the story that slaves were landed, or trans-shipped, via the steps at the headland. While there are very few references to the use of slaves in Ireland, Irish ship-owners and sea captains did partake in the trade. The slaves were apparently being re-embarked somewhere on the western seaboard and would be walked from Creaden to that point for exercise.

It is suggested that the slaves in this instance were thought by the Irish locals to be women since they all (both male and female) wore a type kaftan or flowing garment and in Ireland this type of dress would only be worn by women. Negros in Ireland were allegedly called Blue people since in the Irish language a Black man is traditionally the devil. It is more likely that the people were being transported by Barbary slavers; these slavers would have used the traditional materials and fabrics from their region which even today can be seen in southern Morocco right across into the Sahara. These fabrics are invariably dyed indigo blue and even today are not fixed using modern methods. This causes leakage and colours the skin of the Saharawis and nomadic people of the unclaimed areas blue. This area took a long time to convert to Islam, so it was regarded by the Sultanate as infidel and free to exploit by the slavers working for him. The Barbary slavers and region were identified by the two people who made their way back to Ireland after the entire population of the village of Baltimore in West Cork were kidnapped, so it would seem a plausible explanation and makes the idea of 'gorm' rather than 'dubh' seem fanciful.

Another theory is even more fanciful. It is suggested that the smugglers using the "Forty Steps" on the headland dressed as women for disguise and hence the name for the beach. These and other theories for the placename "Trá na Mná Gorm" are quite fascinating and are still open to conjecture.
