= Hittarp =

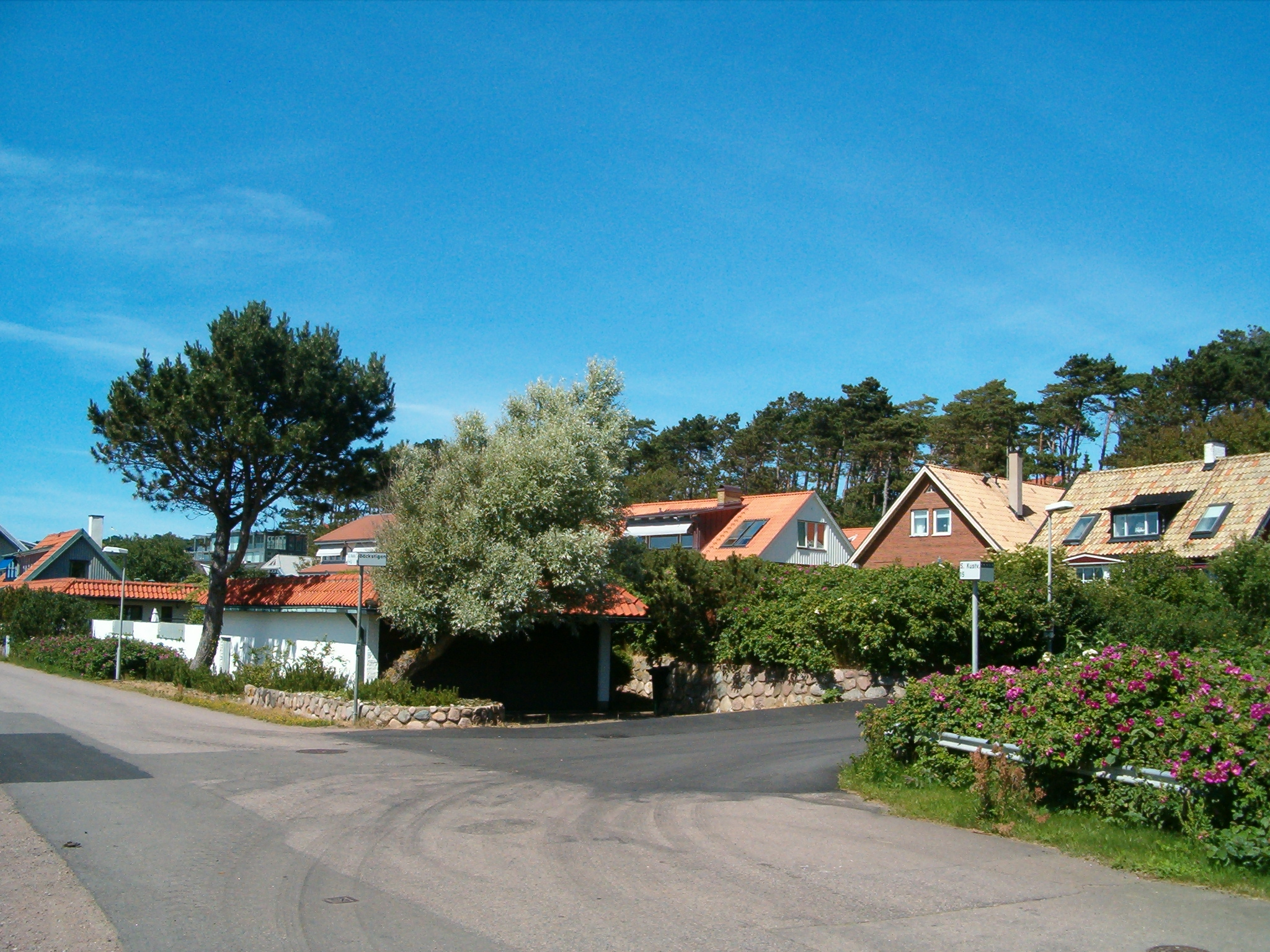

- Location within Skåne Location within Sweden
- Coordinates: 56°05′54″N 12°38′20″E
- Country: Sweden
- Province: Skåne
- County: Skåne County
- Municipality: Helsingborg Municipality

Area
  - Total: 2.08 km^{2} (0.80 sq mi)

Population (31 December 2010)
  - Total: 4,075
  - Density: 1,963/km^{2} (5,080/sq mi)
- Time zone: UTC+1 (CET)
  - Summer (DST): UTC+2 (CEST)

Hittarp is a locality situated in Helsingborg Municipality, Skåne County, Sweden with 4,075 inhabitants in 2010. Just outside Hittarp is Kulla Gunnarstorp Castle, and the Kulla Gunnartorp mill.
