= Capture of Sponvika Redoubt =

Engagement during the Great Northern War

- Part of the Swedish invasion of Norway (1716) during the Great Northern War
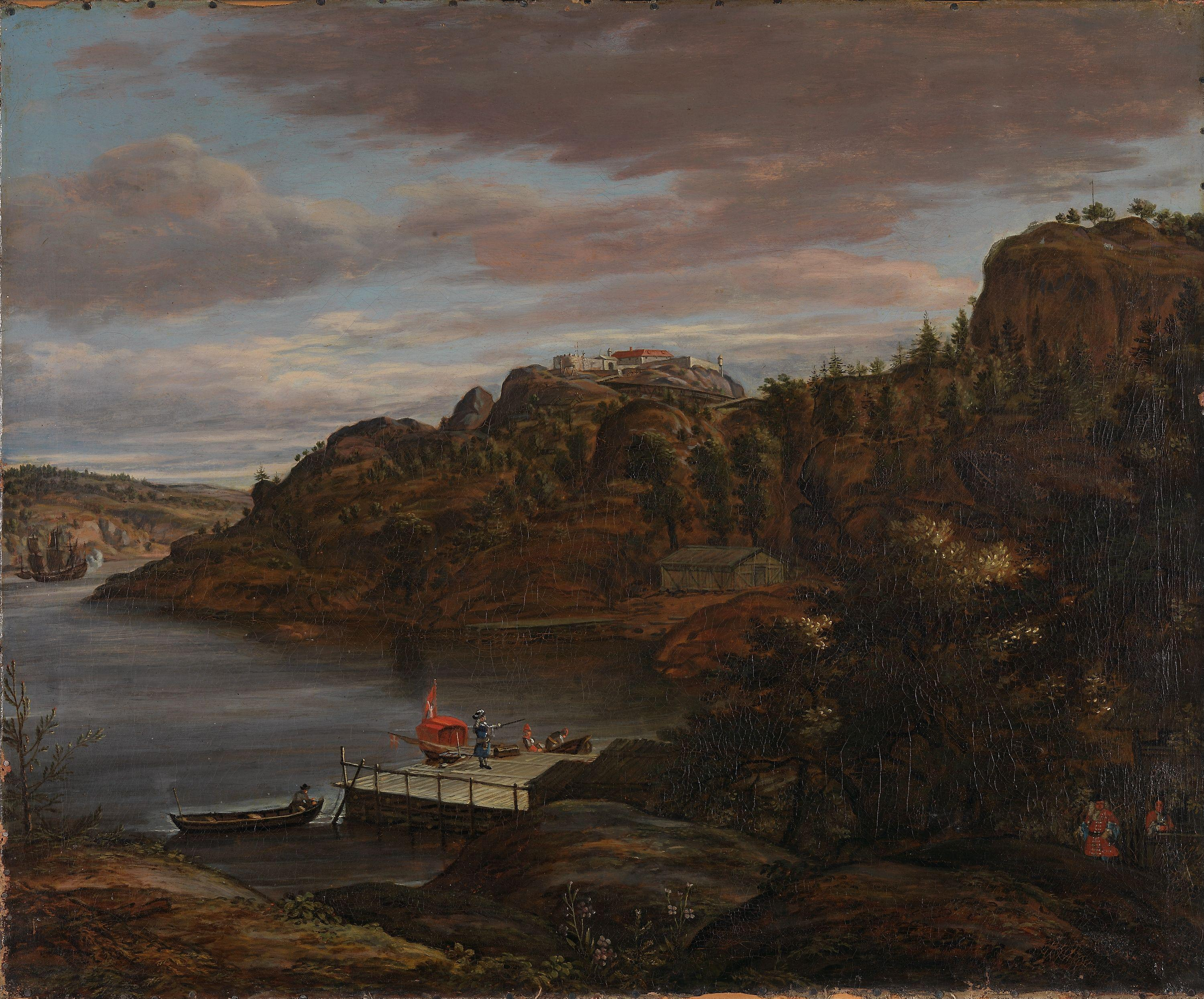
- Sponvika Redoubt in 1702 by Jacob Coning.
Date	23–26 May 1716
Location	Sponvika, Norway 59°5′33.57″N 11°13′47.31″E
Result	Swedish victory

Belligerents
Swedish Empire	Denmark-Norway

Commanders and leaders
Charles XII; Johan Winrich Delwig Liebert Rosenstjerna	Hans Jörgen Günther (POW); Henrik Knoph (POW)

Strength
900 men 2 mortars	154 men

Casualties and losses
Unknown	1 killed 153 captured

The Capture of Sponvika Redoubt (Swedish: Erövringen av Spånviks skansen; Norwegian: Erobringen av Sponvika skanse) took place in late May 1716 during the Swedish invasion of Norway. A 900-strong Swedish detachment from the Västgöta-Dal Regiment, led by Colonel Liebert Rosenstjerna, moved against the redoubt at Sponvika, defended by a 154-strong Norwegian garrison, which capitulated after the arrival of King Charles XII.

By controlling Sponvika, the Norwegians controlled a strongpoint that they used to impede bridge construction around Svinesund and launch minor raids. A previous Swedish assault on the redoubt had been repelled by Dano-Norwegian vessels a few weeks earlier. With orders from Charles XII, Colonel Rosenstjerna, commanding a 900-strong force, positioned his troops around the redoubt on 23 May. Three days later, Charles XII and General Delwig arrived with reinforcements. They initiated a mortar bombardment, expending over 96–160 rounds, which destroyed all three gates of the redoubt. Under the threat of no quarter, the Norwegians capitulated, surrendering four 12-pounders, four 6-pounders, two 3-pounders, and 153 men. Several of the officers taken prisoner were released later that year.

== Background ==
In late February 1716, Charles XII invaded Norway. The campaign aimed to weaken Denmark-Norway by diverting the anti-Swedish coalition’s attention westward, preventing an invasion of Scania, pressuring George I of Great Britain, and, according to Swedish historian Otto Sjögren, securing financial gains through the capture of Kongsberg.

The Swedes drove back the Norwegians at Høland, and eventually took the Norwegian capital of Christiania on 11 March. Following the fall of Christiania, Charles XII repeatedly tried to draw the Norwegian army into a decisive battle by outflanking its defensive positions east of Christiania. After repeated failed attempts to outflank the Norwegian army outside Christiania, Charles XII personally examined their defenses. He concluded that a full assault would be too costly. At the same time, the Swedish lack of preparations for the campaign became clear. Delays allowed the Norwegians to strengthen their defenses and destroy bridge-building materials along the Svinesund. Norwegian forces also took the Swedish supply depot at Moss on 15 March, capturing a large amount of supplies and armed peasants. Although Moss was briefly retaken, General Christian Ludwig von Ascheberg later withdrew his force from Norway. These setbacks, including a failure to besiege Akershus, compelled Charles XII to abandon Christiania, and the Swedes withdrew across the Glomma, establishing a position near Frederikshald, where the campaign stalled.

=== Redoubt ===
The Sponvika redoubt was located west of Svinesund and had disrupted Swedish attempts to build a bridge across the sound. It featured a square masonry tower containing a magazine, quarters, and a guardroom, surrounded by walls with four beam-faced batteries. The redoubt was armed with four 12-pounder, four 6-pounder, and two 3-pounder cannons, and garrisoned by 150 men (excluding officers) under the command of Lieutenant Hans Jörgen Günther and Captain Henrik Knopf.

== Capture ==
A few weeks prior, 200 Swedish troops advanced towards the redoubt and occupied several buildings in the vicinity. However, fire from two Dano-Norwegian sloops forced them to withdraw, again hindering bridge construction across the Svinesund.

A cornet of the Life Dragoons allowed 200 horses to graze unguarded near Sponvika, and Norwegian forces captured them. Sergeant Meister, with six men assigned by Lieutenant Schütz, recovered 50 of the horses; Meister was promoted to ensign, and the cornet was dismissed without honor. The raid enraged Charles XII, and he subsequently sent Colonel Rosenstjerna with 900 men from the Västgöta-Dal Regiment to capture Sponvika on 23 May. Rosenstjerna and his men entrenched on the 24th, constantly harassing the Norwegian garrison with musket fire. Two days later, Charles XII and General Delwig arrived. Cannon fire was opened from the surrounding heights but proved largely ineffective due to the great distance. However, the two mortars positioned opposite the redoubt were able to destroy all three of its gates. Between 96–160 bombs were expended, though only nine struck the redoubt.

=== Capitulation ===
Charles XII ordered Rosenstjerna to divide his force into three assault parties and storm the redoubt. Before the attack began, however, Charles consulted with Delwig and sent Captain Gynther to open negotiations with the redoubt’s commander; Günther likewise dispatched an officer to parley. When asked if he would surrender the redoubt, the Norwegian officer refused, as no bomb had damaged the redoubt aside from the gates. According to Lieutenant Hans Jakob Munck, Gynther replied with:

So you see here what you are warned, and if we are forced to take the fortress by storm, then no person inside will be spared their life, but otherwise you would get good terms.

The Norwegian officer returned to Günther. He later reported that Günther was willing to surrender, provided the terms were set down in writing. The Norwegians subsequently capitulated, and the remaining garrison of 153 men was taken prisoner, together with the redoubt’s armament: four 12-pounder guns, four 6-pounder guns, and two 3-pounder guns. Norwegian losses amounted to one killed and five wounded. Gynther then marched into Sponvika and relieved the Norwegian garrison shortly thereafter.

== Aftermath ==
With the fall of Sponvika, the Swedes solidified their control over the waters of Svinesund. Two days later, the redoubt and its cannons were destroyed, while 300 men from the Dalarna Regiment remained behind to guard the site. Günther was given eight days’ parole to report to the Norwegian garrison in Fredriksten, where he explained that Knoph had unilaterally accepted the redoubt's surrender while he was burning papers upstairs. Both were arrested, exchanged, and tried by court-martial, resulting in their dismissal by King Frederick IV. The remaining Norwegian officers were exchanged later that year, with the exception of Lieutenant Adolph Qvernheim.

There was a month-long stalemate following the capture of Sponvika, apart from skirmishes along the Glomma. Charles XII would later launch a futile assault on Fredrikshald and Fredriksten, suffering nearly 500 losses. This, coupled with the recent defeat at Dynekilen, brought the invasion of Norway to an end as the Swedes withdrew in late June.

== Bibliography ==
- Hatton, Ragnhild Marie (1968). Charles XII of Sweden. New York: Weybright and Talley. ISBN 0297748262.
- Generalstaben (1927). Carl XII i Norge, Peter I i Danmark 1716 [Charles XII in Norway, Peter I in Denmark 1716]. Bidrag til den store nordiske krigs historie (in Danish). Vol. 8. Copenhagen and Oslo: Det Nordiske Forlag. OCLC 929129182.
- Munthe, Carl Oscar (1906). Frederikshalds og Frederiksstens historie indtil 1720 [History of Fredriksten and Fredrikshald until 1720] (in Norwegian). Oslo: Aschehoug. OCLC 903679135.
- Wahl, Johan Olaus (1903). Felttogene 1716 og 1718 [The campaigns of 1716 and 1718] (in Norwegian). Oslo: Grøndahl & Søn Forlag. OCLC 38710800.
- Lagermark, Johan August (1883). Karl XII:s krig i Norge 1716 [Charles XII’s war in Norway 1716] (in Swedish). Uppsala: Akademiska boktryckeriet, E. Berling. OCLC 27125301.
- Sjögren, Otto (1899). Karl den Tolfte och hans män [Charles the Twelfth and his men] (in Swedish). Stockholm: Fröléen and Comp. OCLC 1405259487.
- Munck, Hans Jacob (1864). "Utdrag ur löjtnanten H. J. Muncks dagbok: 1712-18" [Excerpts from Lieutenant H. J. Munck's diary: 1712-18]. Historiska Handlingar (in Swedish). Vol. 4. Stockholm: P. A. Norstedt. pp. 160–181. OCLC 1752156.
