= 1684 in Sweden =

- Years in Sweden: 1681 1682 1683 1684 1685 1686 1687
- Centuries: 16th century · 17th century · 18th century
- Decades: 1650s 1660s 1670s 1680s 1690s 1700s 1710s
- Years: 1681 1682 1683 1684 1685 1686 1687

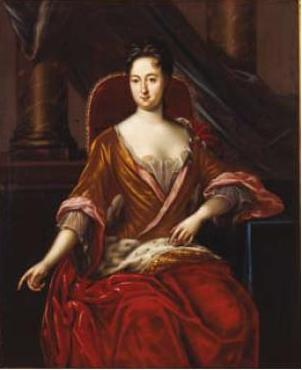
Sofia Lovisa von Ascheberg

Events from the year 1684 in Sweden

== Incumbents ==
- Monarch – Charles XI

== Events ==
- The religious process against the visionary Eva Margareta Frölich in Stockholm.

== Births ==
- Brigitta Scherzenfeldt, memoirist and weaving teacher who was captured during the Great Northern War and lived as a slave in the Dzungar Khanate in Central Asia (died 1736).
