= Nils Gyllenstierna =

Swedish army officer and statesman (1648–1720)

Greve Nils Gyllenstierna
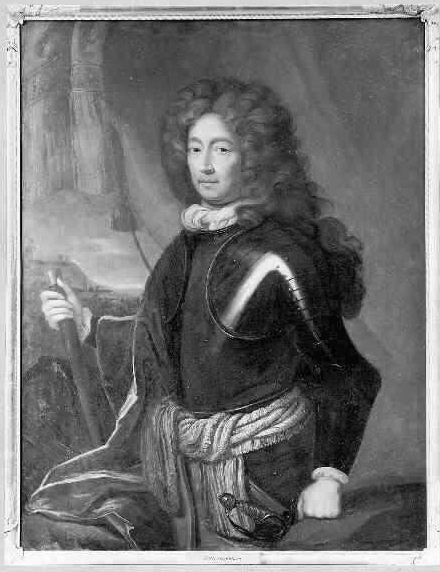
- Nils Gyllenstierna; Painting by Martin Mijtens the Elder.
- Born: 13 October 1648; Swedish Wismar
- Died: 30 March 1720 (aged 71); Stockholm, Sweden
- Burial place: Kungsholms Church, Stockholm
- Military career
- Allegiance: Sweden 1666-1668; Münster 1672-1673; Osnabrück 1674-1675; Sweden 1675-1720
- Rank: Field Marshal
- Conflicts: Second Swedish-Bremian War; Franco-Dutch War * Siege of Groningen * Battle of Seneffe wia Scanian War * Battle of Landskrona; Great Northern War * Battle of Reinbek * Siege of Tönning
- Awards: Greve af Fogelvik 1706

Nils Carlsson Gyllenstierna af Fogelvik (13 October 1648 – 30 March 1720), a member of the Swedish baronial family of Gyllenstierna, was a Swedish field-marshal, member of the Royal Council, president of the Board of War, and governor-general of Bremen-Verden. Rewarded with the earldom of Fogelvik, he belonged to the cautious senior officers, who he hesitated when faced with Charles XII's aggressive plans, and allied with his son-in-law Arvid Horn in opposition to the King.

== Early career ==
Gyllenstierna studied at the universities of Rostock and Königsberg. At the outbreak of the Swedish war with Bremen in 1666, he enlisted as a pikeman in Swedish service, but was soon commissioned; reaching captain's rank in 1668. Gyllenstierna undertook a grand tour 1669-1672, which also included a visit with the Knights of Malta. When the French in 1672 attacked the Dutch Republic, Gyllenstierna became captain in a regiment of the Prince-Bishopric of Munster that fought against the Dutch, but soon became major in a regiment of the Prince-Bishopric of Osnabruck that was in Dutch service, and there promoted to lieutenant-colonel in 1674.

== Senior officer ==
When the Scanian war began in 1675, Gyllenstierna was recalled by the Swedish government; becoming colonel of Norra Skanska kavalleriregementet in 1677. In 1693 he was promoted to major-general of cavalry and appointed governor of Jönköping county; in 1696 to lieutenant-general, and governor of Swedish Wismar; and in 1698 to general of cavalry, and governor-general of Bremen-Verden. At the outbreak of the Great Northern War, Gyllenstierna who was commander-in-chief of the Swedish forces in Germany, crossed the Elbe, and beat the Danes at Reinbek. In 1702 he commanded the Swedish reinforcements that were transferred from Germany to Poland. In 1708, he commanded the forces of the Lower Saxon Circle that occupied Hamburg, and was rewarded for the successful operation with promotion to field-marshal. Although a royal councillor since 1705, Gyllenstierna remained in Germany until 1711, when he returned to Sweden, becoming president of the Board of War. Between 1714 and 1719 he was also commander-in-chief of the Swedish forces in Skåne.

== Political role ==
Gyllenstierna belonged to the cautious senior officers who hesitated before the aggressive plans of Charles XII. His objections lead to the shelving of a planned attack on the Electorate of Saxony in 1701; he also argued against the invasion of the Polish–Lithuanian Commonwealth. After the battle of Poltava, Gyllenstierna opposed the rearmament policy advocated by Magnus Stenbock, as too onerous for the country, and in the Royal Council he joined with his son-in-law Arvid Horn in his opposition to the absent King. In the power struggle after the death of the King, Gyllenstierna again allied with Horn, but died in 1720.
