= 1685 in Sweden =

- Decades: 1660s; 1670s; 1680s; 1690s; 1700s
- See also: Other events of 1685; Timeline of Swedish history

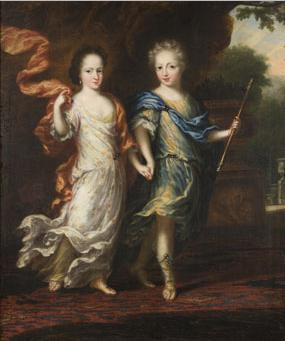
Painting of the future Charles XII of Sweden and his sister Princess Hedvig Sofia

Events from the year 1685 in Sweden.

== Incumbents ==
- Monarch – Charles XI

== Events ==
- Jews are formally banned from residing in Sweden. As there is no Jewish minority in Sweden, the ban is in effect a ban against Jewish immigration.
- The postal service are now finally, in practice, available in all the nation.
- Guds Werk och Hwila by Haquin Spegel
- The Sami religion, which is still openly practiced, is officially outlawed and all evidence of such practice is liable to an arrest, which results in the final forced official conversion of the Sami people to Christianity.

== Births ==
- 7 January – Jonas Alströmer, pioneer and agriculture and industry (died 1761)
- 22 July – Henrik Magnus von Buddenbrock, baron (died 1743)
- 6 December – George Bogislaus Staël von Holstein, baron and field marshal (died 1763)

== Deaths ==
- 24 September - Gustaf Otto Stenbock, politician and military (born 1614)
- 8 June 1685 - Ulrik, Prince of Sweden (born 1684)
- 26 April 1685 - Gustaf, Prince of Sweden (born 14 June 1683)
- 22 October 1685 - Fredrick, Prince of Sweden (born 7 October 1685)
