= 1718 in Sweden =

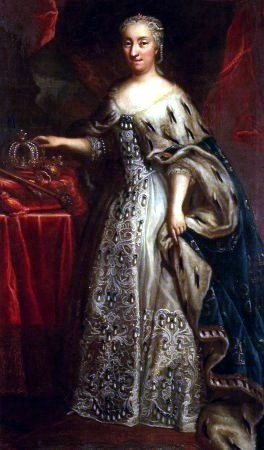
Ulrika Eleonora, Queen of Sweden

Events from the year 1718 in Sweden

== Incumbents ==
- Monarch – Charles XII then Ulrika Eleonora

== Events ==
- April – The royal privateer Lars Gathenhielm dies and his widow Ingela Gathenhielm takes over his Baltic privateer- and pirate empire.
- May – Charles XII issue peace negotiations with Russia on Åland, handled by Georg Heinrich von Görtz, in a hope to conquer the Danish province of Norway with Russian help.
- 29 August – 10,000 men under the command of Lieutenant-general Carl Gustaf Armfeldt attacked Trøndelag from Jemtland.
- October 30 – Charles XII attacks Norway.
- November 12 – Georg Heinrich von Görtz leaves the negotiations with Russia with a proposed peace treaty.
- November 30 – King Charles XII of Sweden is killed at Fredrikshald in Norway.
- December 1 – The brother-in-law of Charles XII and spouse of Princess Ulrika Eleonora, Frederick of Holstein-Gottorp, discontinue the siege of Fredrikshald.
- December 2 – Georg Heinrich von Görtz is arrested by Frederick of Hesse for supporting Charles Frederick, Duke of Holstein-Gottorp, the rival of Ulrika Eleonora to the throne.
- December 5 – The news of the death of Charles XII reaches Stockholm.
- December 6 – Following the death of Charles XII on November 30, his sister Ulrika Eleonora proclaims herself Queen regnant of Sweden, as the news of her brother's death reaches Stockholm.

== Births ==
- 15 July – Alexander Roslin, painter (died 1793)
- 28 November – Hedvig Charlotta Nordenflycht, writer and poet (died 1763)
- October 25 – Reinhold Angerstein, metallurgist (died 1760)
- Anna Maria Hjärne, courtier (died 1798)

== Deaths ==
- April – Lars Gathenhielm, privateer and pirate (born 1689)
- November 30 – King Charles XII of Sweden, monarch (born 1682)
