= 1613 in Sweden =

Events from the year 1613 in Sweden.

== Incumbents ==
- Monarch – Gustaf II Adolf

== Events ==
- - Treaty of Knäred

== Births ==
- - Carl Gustaf Wrangel, military commander and politician (died 1676)
- - Malin Matsdotter, alleged witch (died 1676)

== Deaths ==
- - Sigrid Sture
- - Karin Nilsdotter, royal lover (born 1551)
