= Invasion of Norway =

Invasion of Norway may refer to:

- 1033 invasion by Tryggvi the Pretender
- 1567 Swedish invasion during the Northern Seven Years' War
- 1658 Swedish invasion during the Second Northern War
- 1716 Swedish invasion during the Great Northern War
- 1808 Swedish invasion during the Dano-Swedish War of 1808–1809
- 1814 Swedish invasion during the Swedish–Norwegian War (1814)
- 1940 Norwegian campaign of World War II
  - Operation Weserübung, the German invasion that began that campaign
