= Norwegian campaign of 1716 =

Invasion of Norway during the Great Northern War

Norwegian campaign
- Part of the Great Northern War
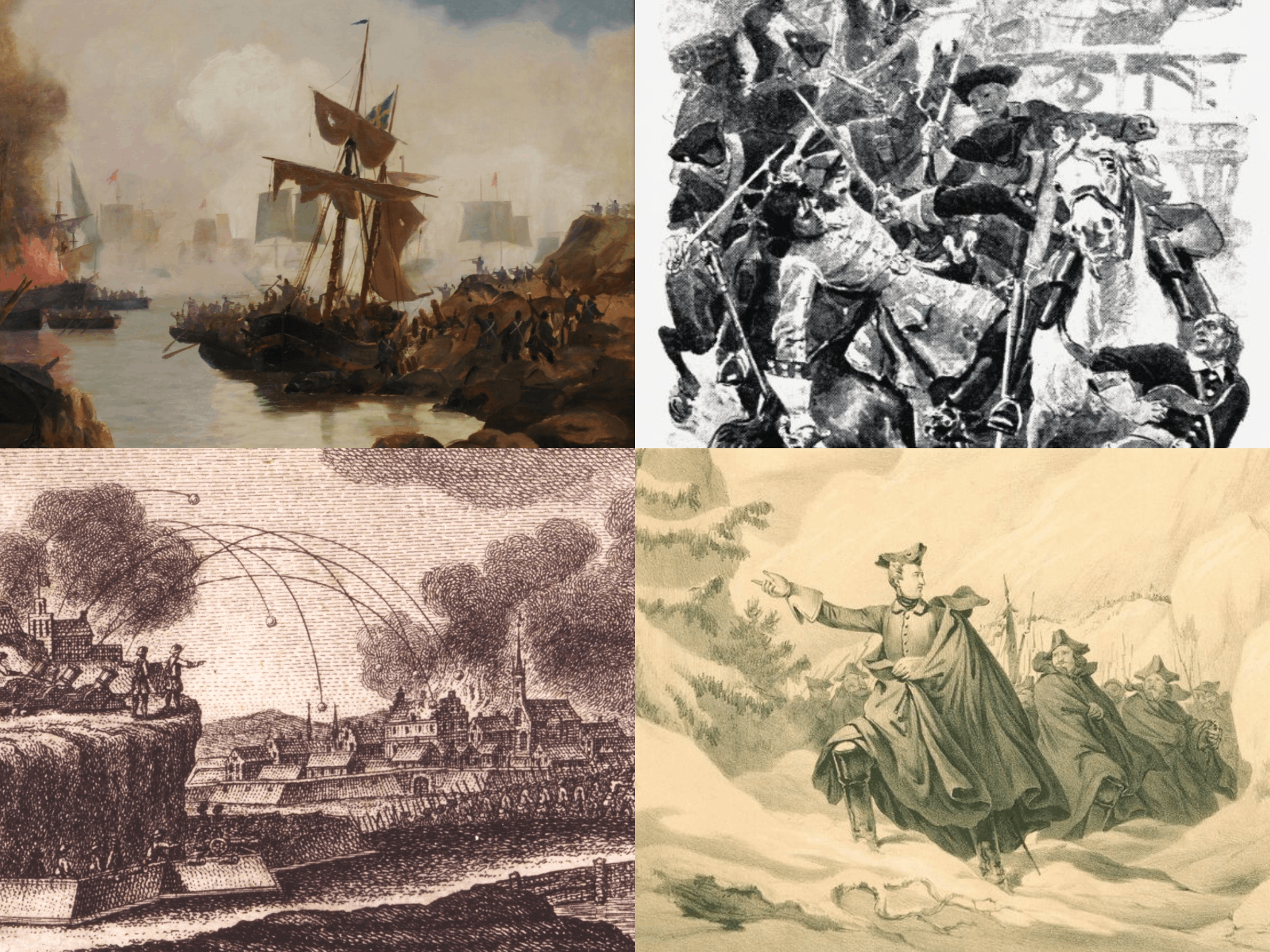
- Clockwise, from top left: Dynekilen; Høland; Fredrikshald; Inbrottet i Norrige
| Date | 26 February – 28 June 1716 |
| Location | Norway |
| Result | Dano–Norwegian victory |

Belligerents
| Swedish Empire | Denmark-Norway |

Commanders and leaders
| Charles XII; Carl Gustaf Mörner; Christian Ludwig von Ascheberg | Barthold Heinrich von Lützow |

Casualties and losses
| 2,500: 1,000 killed or wounded; 1,500 captured | Unknown |

The Norwegian campaign of 1716 was led by Charles XII of Sweden and took place during the Great Northern War. Despite taking the Norwegian capital of Christiania, the Swedes were unable to capture the crucial fortresses of Akershus and Fredriksten. Furthermore, they were crippled by logistical issues and harsh winter conditions. With their supply lines cut off, the Swedes were forced to abandon the campaign in late June, having failed to achieve any of their objectives.

An enterprise to land on Zealand through a frozen Øresund (the Sound) failed, and Charles shifted his focus to Norway to cripple Denmark-Norway’s position. In early February, the Swedes crossed the border and defeated a Norwegian force near Høland, then halted for several days because of a heavy snowstorm before advancing toward Christiania with General Mörner’s reinforcements. Norwegian commander Barthold Heinrich von Lützow, deeming the city indefensible, withdrew, allowing the Swedes to enter Christiania unopposed in early March after skillful maneuvers through the Bundefjord.

Attempts to outflank the Norwegian army at Gjellebekk resulted in defeats at Norderhov and Krokskogen, and the siege of Akershus failed due to a lack of artillery. Threatened with encirclement, the Swedes evacuated Christiania, and General Ascheberg's retreat in late March further complicated their position.

Charles regrouped at Torpum and attacked Fredrikshald and Fredriksten. Though Fredrikshald was taken, its commander burned the town, and Fredriksten held off a storming. The Swedish assault failed with heavy casualties, and the defeat at Dynekilen effectively concluded the campaign, prompting the Swedish withdrawal in late June.

== Background ==
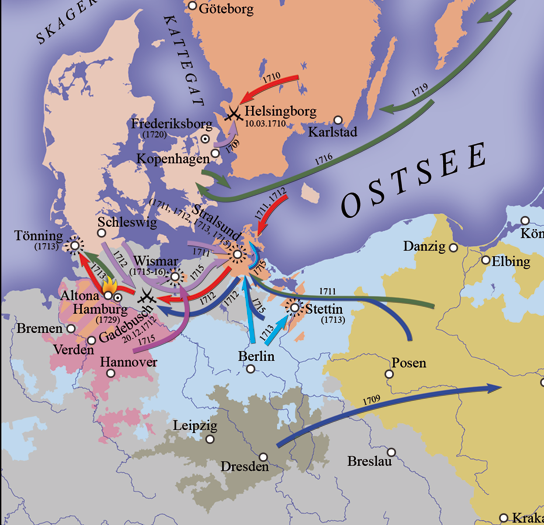
The war in Northern Germany from 1711 to 1715.

A convention in The Hague to discuss the status of Sweden's German possessions was unsuccessful due to Charles' intervention. Consequently, in 1711, the coalition advanced into Sweden's German possessions. However, a lack of artillery meant that they achieved little that year. Despite this, the coalition captured several fortresses, including Stade. A counter-offensive by Magnus Stenbock, however, resulted in a Swedish victory at the Battle of Gadebusch. Stenbock's victory was in vain, as the coalition would pursue him, forcing his capitulation at Tönning in 1713, while the Swedish garrison of Stettin also capitulated later that year. Yet, Stralsund and Wismar, Sweden's last remaining territories on the continent, held out against these odds.

While events unfolded in Northern Germany, Peter I, aiming to force Sweden to sue for peace, launched campaigns into Finland in 1713. Carl Gustaf Armfeldt, commanding the Finnish army, put forward a futile defense. Swedish defeats at Pälkäne and Storkyo eventually led to the near-complete Russian occupation of Finland in late 1714, as Armfeldt and his army fell back on Västerbotten.

In November 1714, Charles returned to Europe and assumed command of the Swedish garrison in Stralsund, and in early 1715, he ordered the recapture of Usedom and Wolgast from Prussia, which had been ceded by way of the Treaty of Schwedt. This, among other provocations by the Swedes, was the final straw for Frederick William I of Prussia, and he subsequently entered the anti-Swedish coalition. Later that year, the renewed offensive by the coalition recaptured Usedom and Wolgast, and the siege of Stralsund resumed. Charles' counter-attack at Stresow failed, and Stralsund capitulated alas in December. Charles had fled Stralsund on a brigantine a day prior, arriving in Trelleborg shortly thereafter.

Despite the return of Charles, Sweden's position remained precarious by 1716. Sweden had few allies left, mainly relying on Emperor Charles VI and Louis XIV of France. The latter seemed keen on restoring the Franco-Swedish alliance, for a treaty signed in March 1715 provided Sweden with 600,000 riksdaler for the remaining duration of the war. Moreover, the subsidies brought in the enlistment of foreign troops, particularly French engineers and officers, in droves. There were negotiations with the Emperor in 1715. Charles sought his support on the issue of Sweden's German possessions. Indeed, Charles VI was covertly supportive. However, it was clear that both Hanover and Prussia were too strong for Austria to dislodge. Worse yet, French mediation efforts in the war had created suspicion among the Emperor's inner circle, and the outbreak of the Ottoman-Venetian War in 1714 eventually diverted Austria's attention elsewhere. Therefore, the negotiations yielded no result, and with Prussia's declaration of war on Sweden, it became clear that Sweden's position in Germany could not be salvaged.

Though Charles' return reinstated optimism among the army and people, the anti-Swedish coalition was planning a multi-pronged attack on Sweden. Peter I of Russia would attack from Finland, while Frederick IV was to land in Scania.

== Prelude ==
During the siege of Stralsund, a Norwegian deserter informed Prince Frederick about the apparent lack of defense in Norway. Subsequent discussions led to the formulation of a brief invasion plan. With this information, Prince Frederick advised Charles to prepare for a winter or spring offensive into Norway. Charles agreed, partly to divert Denmark-Norway's attention from the German campaign. However, the navy had to be rearmed first, as any future campaign would require its support. The arrival of winter, however, meant that the plan for Norway was put on hold. Charles now intended to cross the frozen Øresund (the sound) with 10,000–12,000 men from Landskrona and compel Frederick IV to peace. Swedish troops even captured the island of Hven. However, a storm broke up the ice at the last minute, prompting Charles to redirect his focus to Norway. (Note: As Hatton notes, the invasion of Zealand may have served as a feint for the campaign in Norway.)

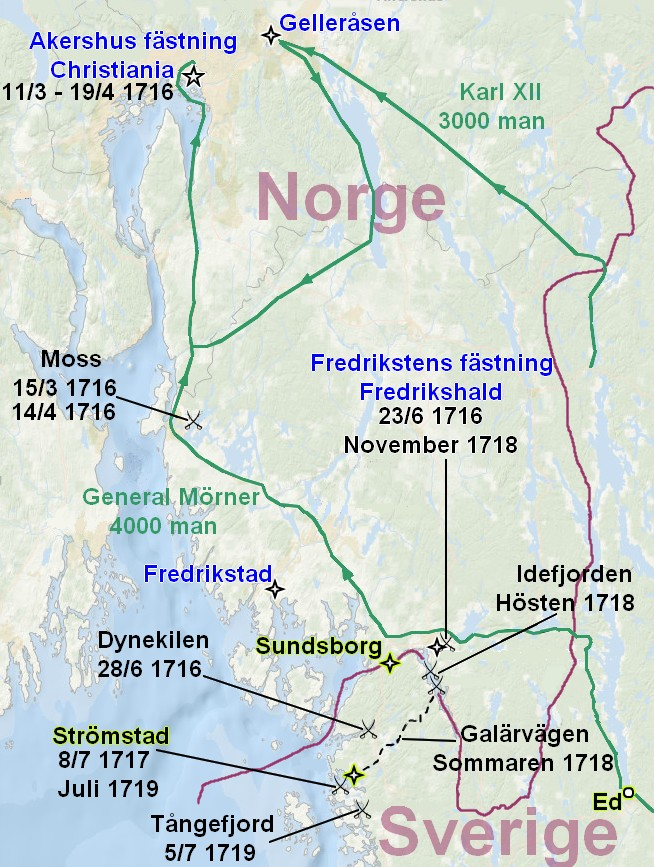
Swedish movements during the invasion.

The main objective of the campaign was to weaken Denmark-Norway, as Frederick IV would have been the central figure in any potential invasion of Sweden. By invading Norway, Charles hoped to divert the attention of the coalition by opening a front in the west and to halt a possible invasion of Scania. Additionally, he hoped to place pressure on George I, who had recently joined the war against Sweden. Furthermore, the Swedish historian Otto Sjögren claims a financial motive for the campaign, as the troop numbers were adequate for the capture of Kongsberg, but insufficient for the conquest of Norway.

=== Plan ===
There were preparations for the campaign, primarily concerning the allotment system, though these proved insufficient when the campaign began. Additionally, the fleets in Karlskrona and Stockholm were prepared to set sail at a moment's notice despite issues regarding equipment and manpower.

The main force, some 3,250 men (Note: 2,600 infantry and 650 cavalry.) under Charles was to march from Värmland toward Christiania, while General Mörner marched from Vänersborg on Moss to join him in the capital with 4,000 men. General Ascheberg's 800 cavalry feigned at Svinesund to deceive the Dano-Norwegians, and the forces in Jämtland (Note: This force consisted of 2,915 men and was commanded by Alexander Stromberg. Due to heavy snow, the planned advance into Røros was never executed.) were to cut off Norwegian reinforcements from the north. The French historian Claude Nordmann claims that Charles aimed to occupy large parts of Norway to gain leverage during future negotiations.

Charles departed from Ystad on 16 February and subsequently proceeded to Karlstad. Troops were inspected at Holmedal on 19 – 22 February. Furthermore, peasants were drawn from Värmland and Dalsland to hold the border.

=== Norwegian defense ===
In late 1715, the commander-in-chief of Norway, General Herman Hausmann developed a comprehensive defense plan for Norway, organizing southern Norway into several military districts comprising approximately 10,000–14,000 troops. Between Fredrikshald and Fredrikstad were 4,000 troops, while an additional 13,000 troops were deployed elsewhere, including northern Norway. Many of these troops were peasant levies. However, Copenhagen set his plan aside due to growing concerns over Charles' planned attack across the Sound. In fact, Hausmann was already scheduled to be dismissed. Upon returning from the campaign in Pomerania, one of Frederick IV's first actions was to sack General Hausmann in early 1716. The reason is unknown; perhaps it was due to his eagerness to attack the Swedes.

His position was to be awarded to General Erhard Wedel Jarlsberg, but Wedel was too ill to arrive in Norway in time. Moreover, Frederick IV and Wedel frequently disagreed on matters of supply, finance, and command. Until Wedel could takeover, General Barthold Heinrich von Lützow, commander of the Fredrikshald District, assumed temporary command. He promptly deployed all available troops according to Hausmann's unimplemented plan. Lützow was also hampered by the ineffective government in Christiania, which comprised a board of five members.

== Campaign ==
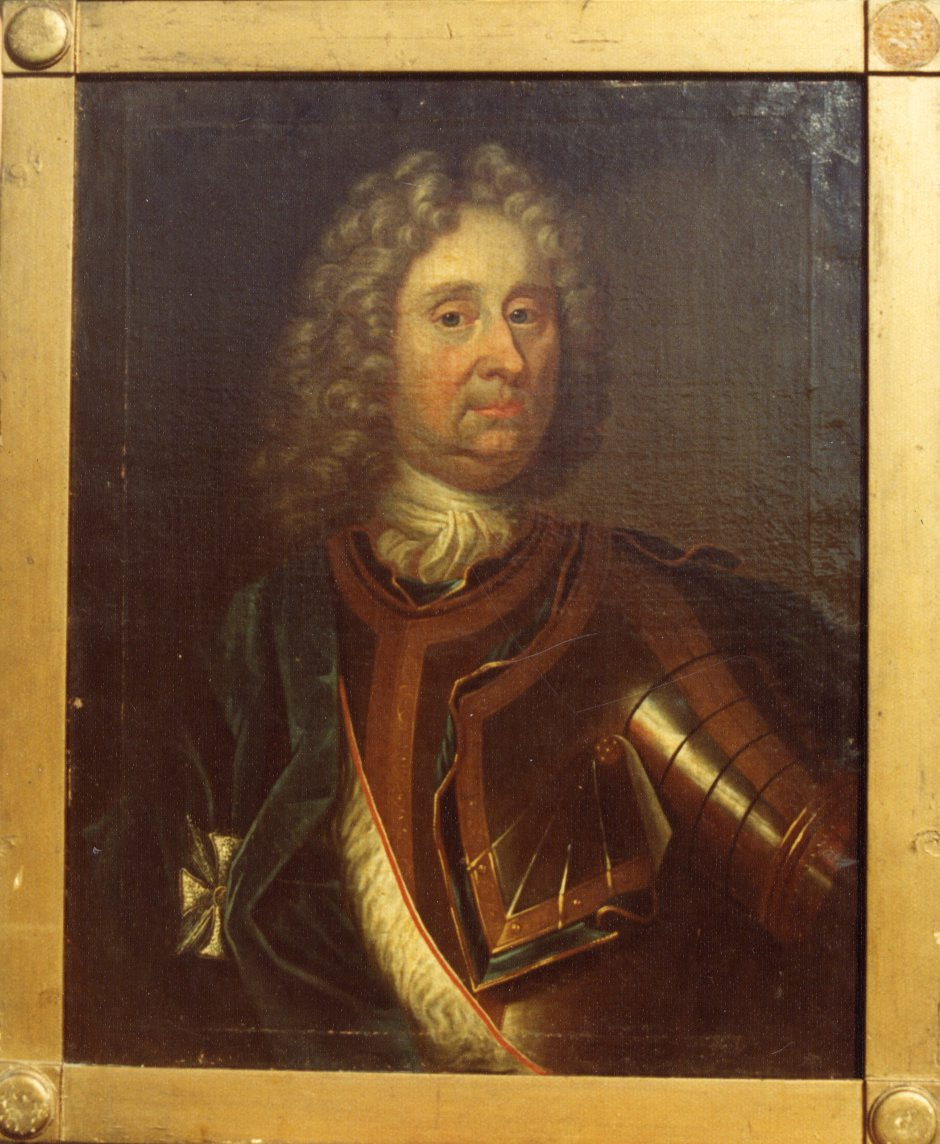
Barthold Heinrich von Lützow.

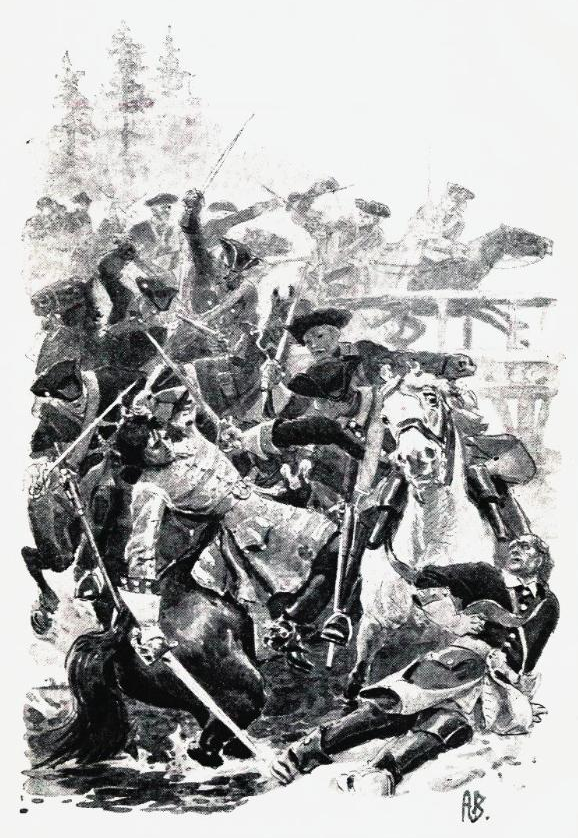
Battle of Høland by Andreas Bloch.

=== 26 February – 11 March ===
A proclamation to the Norwegian people was issued by Charles, stating that the goal of the Swedish invasion was to convince Frederick IV to sign a peace treaty. On 26 February, the Swedes crossed the border into Norway. The Norwegians had left a force at Høland, which was caught off guard and captured by the Swedish vanguard. However, a determined counterattack by Colonel Kruse's 200 dragoons had led to the near capture of Charles, with 7 Swedes killed and many more wounded. Additionally, Prince Frederick and Stanisław Poniatowski were badly wounded in the fighting, to the point where they had to return to Sweden. The Swedes held off the Norwegian assault, and Colonel Kruse was eventually taken prisoner, who was then praised by Charles for his bravery in the battle the following day. Charles reportedly said to Kruse:

If my brother Fredrik (Frederick IV) has many men like you, then it will not be easy to wage war against him.

That day, however, Norwegian reinforcements arrived in the form of several hundred men at Rakkestad. Aware of the fighting, they decided against attacking. Charles chose not to attack, as his cavalry were in a poor state and his infantry were few in number.

==== Fall of Christiania ====
A severe snowstorm meant that the planned advance on Christiania was delayed, and the Swedes stayed in Høland for two days, though troops were sent out to locate Norwegian forces. The Norwegians took advantage of the Swedes' inaction by organizing the defense of Christiania and positioning men east of it. On 1 March, the Swedes advanced from Høland towards Svindal, with the Glomma being crossed the following day. Colonel Schlippenbach attempted to break through the Norwegian position at Bakåsen, but failed due to the heavy snow. Charles concluded that it would be impossible to break through, and thus he withdrew to Stalsberg, where the Swedes encamped. The Norwegian position at Gjelleråsen was reconnoitered by Charles himself the next day. Once more, he concluded that an assault would be impossible due to the large number of Norwegian reinforcements. Thus, he decided to combine forces with Mörner's force to outflank the Norwegians. Mörner's advance north of Moss, which began on 27 February, was almost entirely unopposed due to Lützow's decision to divert troops to face Charles. Mörner arrived in Hafslund on 2 March, and Moss on 6 March. Mörner had sent detachments to locate Charles's army on 7 March, and the following day, Mörner linked up with Charles's army in force.

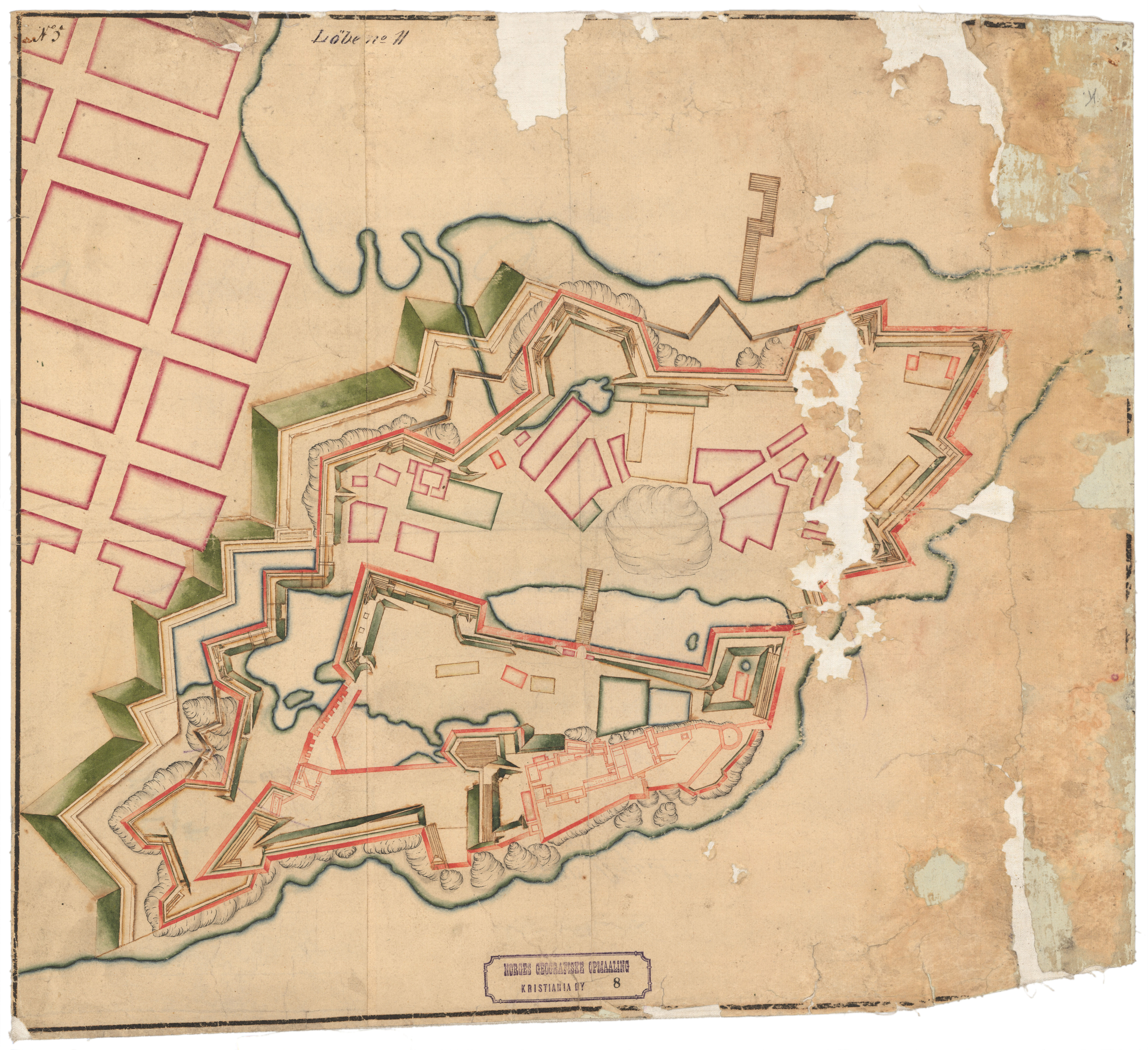
Map of Akershus in 1700.

With both armies united, which now numbered 8,000, Charles advanced from Hølen, hoping to engage the Norwegians in a pitched battle. Still, their attempts at delaying Charles had meant the Swedes had to cross the Bundefjord on 10 March. The Norwegians, after utilizing Akershus Fortress to delay the Swedes, withdrew across the ice. Lützow, after convening a Council of War, decided to withdraw from Christiania. Christiania was occupied between 10 – 11 March, with the Swedes meeting little opposition. Akershus was resupplied before the Norwegian forces relocated to Drammen and Gjellebekk. The fall of Christiania had also led to widespread panic among the Norwegian side. The Swedes, alas, had a roof over their heads at Christiania, and they were also able to obtain enough provisions. However, for the occupation of Christiania to be of any strategic importance, the fortress of Akershus had to be taken, and preparations soon began for its capture. It soon became apparent that Akershus would not fall to a simple storming and that heavy siege artillery would be required to capture it, while an attempt to force the fortress to capitulate by cutting off the waterways leading into it failed.

=== Occupation of Christiania (11 March – 19 April) ===
Charles again hoped to lure the Norwegians into a pitched battle. To outflank the repositioned Norwegian army and gain further intel, Charles dispatched Colonels Löwenstierna and Bielke to achieve this. After driving back two outposts at Gjellebekk, Löwenstierna found the Norwegian position impossible to attack frontally, leading to his retreat to Ravnsborg. Charles then ordered Colonel Axel Löwen with 500 cavalry to flank through Hadeland and Ringerike while attacking from Ravnsborg simultaneously, but a position at Harestueskogen delayed Löwen's march. Lützow, informed of the flanking maneuver, intercepted and captured Löwen as well as his force at Norderhov, with the remaining troops retreating to Christiania. Colonel Schlippenbach made the last attempt towards Bærum with Major Nieroth advancing to clear Krokskogen, but even after heavy losses, they could not break through the Norwegian position. Charles then reconnoitered the position himself on 22 March and concluded that any full-scale attack would be too costly.

By now, the Swedes' lack of preparation and planning began to show. On 12 March, after much delay, General Ascheberg began his advance across the Svinesund. More importantly, however, the delay had allowed the Norwegians to reinforce their position and destroy all the timber needed for the construction of bridges between Fredrikshald and Spånvik.

Upon linking with Charles, Mörner left his baggage and numerous ill soldiers at Moss. Armed peasants from Dalsland, led by Major Thesmar, defended the depot at Moss. The Norwegians attacked on 15 March and captured all the supplies, the sick, and 383 men, then withdrew in the morning. Afterwards, Charles sent Colonel Falkenberg to retake Moss and restore the connection with Ascheberg. Moss was recaptured, with the Swedes only encountering a few Norwegian farmers. Meanwhile, upon reaching Skjeberg, Ascheberg was falsely informed by a Norwegian peasant that the Danes had landed troops at Frederikshald (or Fredrikstad). Alarmed, he withdrew back to Sweden on 26 – 27 March. His letter to Charles informing him of his decision was intercepted, and it was only on 9 April that Charles learned of his withdrawal. With the retreat of Ascheberg, the men in Christiania were entirely cut off from Sweden. Ascheberg was eventually sacked and arrested by Major General Delvig, who was dispatched with 500 cavalry to build a bridge over the Svinesund to bring in the much-needed guns from the Gothenburg Squadron, along with reinforcements.

The Swedish garrison at Moss, led by Colonel Falkenberg, put up a strong defense, but the Norwegians retook the town on 12 April following heavy street fighting. Colonel Falkenberg was killed, and the entire garrison of 600 was either killed or captured. In contrast, the Norwegians only lost 100 men.

=== 19 April – 28 June ===
Charles' position in Christiania was untenable due to Dano-Norwegian naval supremacy and the inaction of the Gothenburg Squadron. Thus, he and the army withdrew from the city on 19 April O.S. (30 April N.S.) in forced marches, reaching the Glomma before Danish reinforcements could arrive. The Swedes crossed at Onstadsund on 21 April using makeshift rafts. When Charles requested to lead the rearguard, Major General Hamilton reportedly responded with:

Your Majesty understands only how to advance and has no experience of the opposite movement; I request command of the rear guard and believe I can then answer for the army's salvation.

On 26 April, Delvig completed construction of the aforementioned bridge, ensuring communication lines with Sweden were safe. Rather than fully retreat, Charles established his headquarters at Torpum near Frederikshald, remaining there for eight weeks while awaiting supplies from Gothenburg. During the stalemate at Torpum, Charles was nearly killed on 9 May at Sannesund when his horse was shot from under him. The Norwegians also attempted to destroy the Svinesund bridge using a customized barge on 22 May, but the attack failed.

==== Capture of Sponvika ====
Annoyed by the resistance at Sponvika redoubt, Charles ordered Colonel Rosenstjerna with 900 men to capture the redoubt, located near Svinesund. Rosenstjerna was later joined by the king and Delvig. After a brief bombardment on 26 May, the garrison of 150 men capitulated under threat of no quarter, after which the redoubt was burned and demolished a few days later.

==== Battle of Fredrikshald ====
On 22 June, to break the nearly month-long stalemate, Charles prepared a night assault on Frederiksten fortress with 1,500 men. They crossed the Tistedal River and approached Fredrikshald before dawn, but Norwegian pickets had already detected their movement, thus negating the Swedes' element of surprise.

In the early hours of 23 June, Fredrikshald was attacked and subsequently captured by the Swedes after heavy fighting. Yet, the assaults on the outer works of Fredriksten by another column faltered, even after heavy losses. At the same time, the Swedes were hammered by fire from the Norwegian flotilla and the fortress. To bring in further reinforcements, Charles ordered the town bridge to be repaired, prompting the commander of Fredrikshald, Hans Jacob Brun, to set the town on fire. With the fires out of control and his ceasefire offer rejected, Charles withdrew to Torpum, bringing with him several dozen captured Norwegians. The costly assault had led to 500 casualties, including Major Generals Delvig and Schomer.

A few days later, the Danes destroyed the Swedish supply convoy at Dynekilen. The setbacks at Fredrikshald and Dynekilen forced the Swedes' complete withdrawal from Norway on 28 – 29 June.

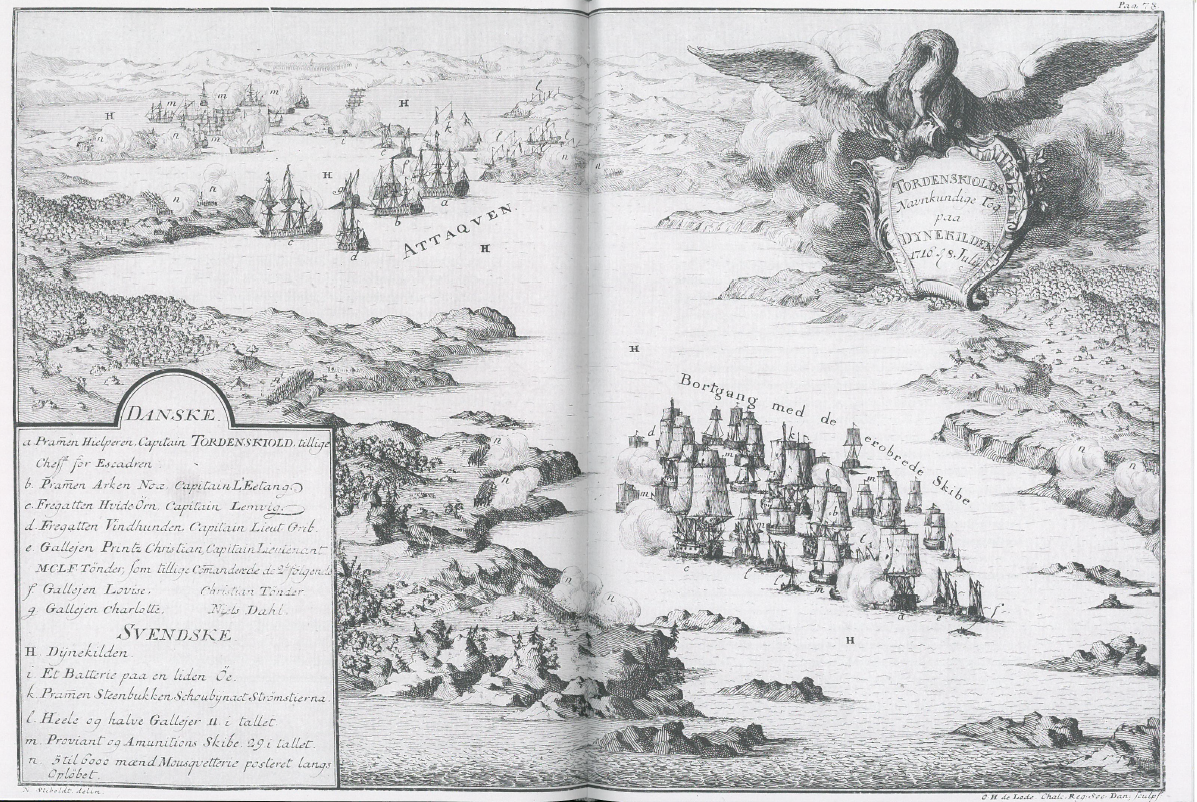
Battle of Dynekilen.

== Aftermath ==
While the Swedes withdrew across the Svinesund, Lützow ordered Tordenskjold to attack them. However, heavy resistance compelled him to withdraw.

Many of the Swedish regiments were redeployed elsewhere. Still, the army remained in the vicinity of Svinesund, aiming to prevent a Norwegian incursion into Sweden. Moreover, construction of Fort Sundsborg near Svinesund also began a month later, for another campaign into Norway in the near future.

== Sources ==
=== Bibliography ===
- Ullgren, Peter (2008). "Soldaterna dikterar: Karl XII:s ledarskap under fälttåget i Norge 1716" [The soldiers dictate: Charles XII's leadership during the campaign in Norway in 1716]. Karolinska Förbundet Årsbok: 2008 (in Swedish). Stockholm: Karolinska förbundet: 140–148. ISSN 0348-9833.
- Liljegren, Bengt (2000). Karl XII: en biografi [Charles XII: a biography] (in Swedish). Lund: Historiska Media. ISBN 9188930998.
- Nordmann, Claude (1971). Grandeur et liberté de la Suède (1660-1792) [Greatness and liberty of Sweden (1660-1792)] (in French). Paris: Béatrice-Nauwelaerts. OCLC 541689.
- Hatton, Ragnhild Marie (1968). Charles XII of Sweden. New York City: Weybright and Talley. OCLC 73444.
- Haintz, Otto (1958). Der Ausgang der Königstragödie: 1715-1719 [The conclusion of the royal tragedy: 1715-1719]. König Karl XII. von Schweden (in German). Vol. 3. Berlin: De Gruyter. OCLC 7351553140.
- Generalstaben (1927). Tuxen, August Peter (ed.). Carl XII i Norge, Peter I i Danmark 1716 [Charles XII in Norway, Peter I in Denmark 1716]. Bidrag til den store nordiske krigs historie (in Danish). Vol. 8. Copenhagen: Det Nordiske Forlag. OCLC 929129182.
- Wikander, Johan Gustaf (1922). Översikt över Sveriges krig under 1700-talet [Overview of Sweden’s wars in the 18th century]. Militärlitteraturföreningen (in Swedish). Vol. 133. Stockholm: Militärlitteraturföreningens Förlag. OCLC 484728292.
- Munthe, Carl Oscar (1914). Den norsk hær indtil 1814: Med 23 skisser i teksten og 4 kartbilag [The Norwegian army until 1814: With 23 sketches in the text and 4 map appendices] (in Norwegian). Oslo: Grøndahl & Søn Forlag. OCLC 464184921.
- Sjögren, Otto (1899). Karl den Tolfte och hans män [Charles the Twelfth and his men] (in Swedish). Stockholm: Fröléen and Comp. OCLC 1405259487.
- Lagermark, Johan August (1883). Karl XII:s krig i Norge 1716 [Charles XII’s war in Norway 1716]. Upsala Universitets Årsskrift: 1883 (in Swedish). Vol. 3. Uppsala: Uppsala University. OCLC 27125301.
