= 1676 in Sweden =

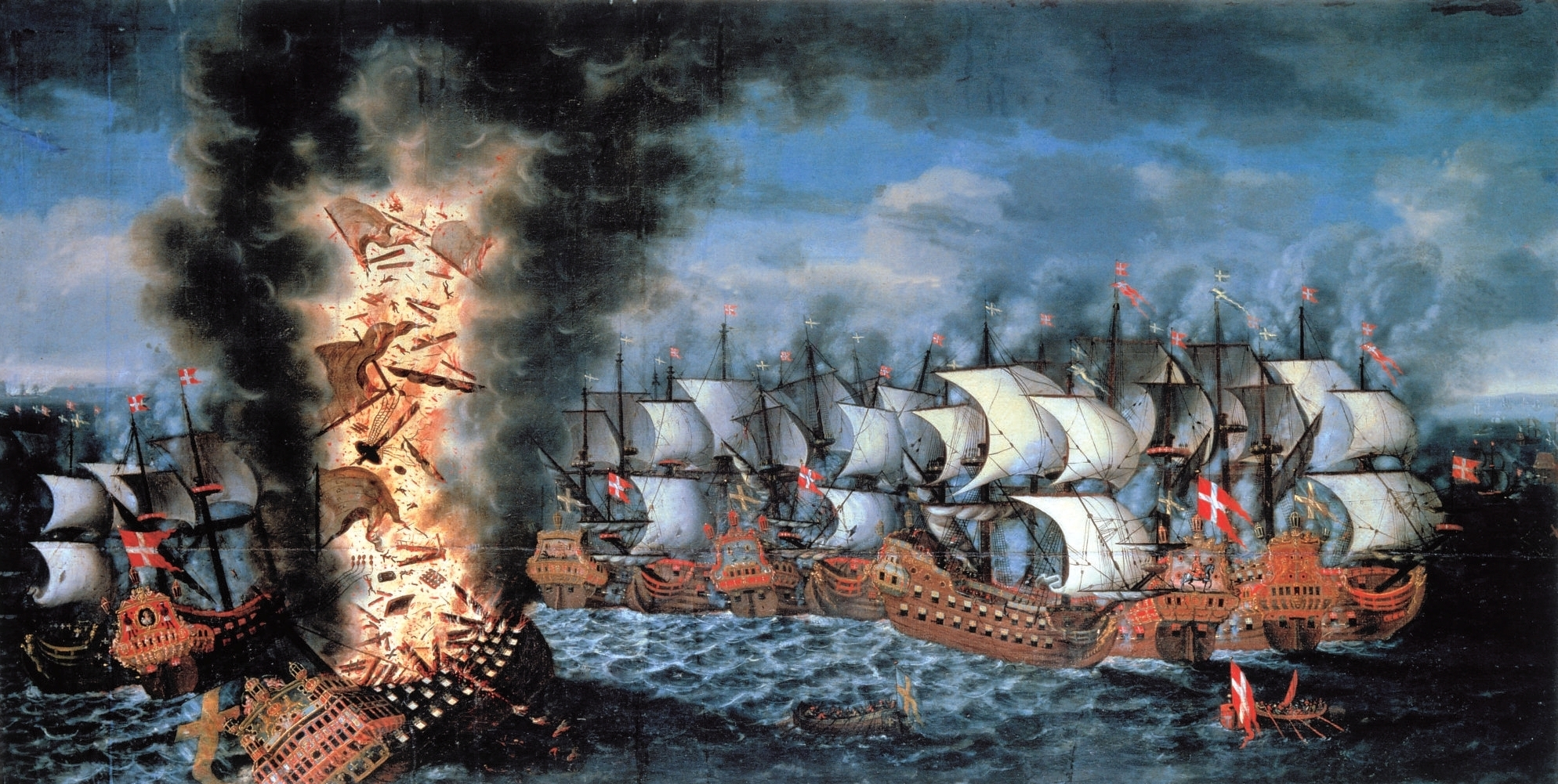
The Battle of Öland

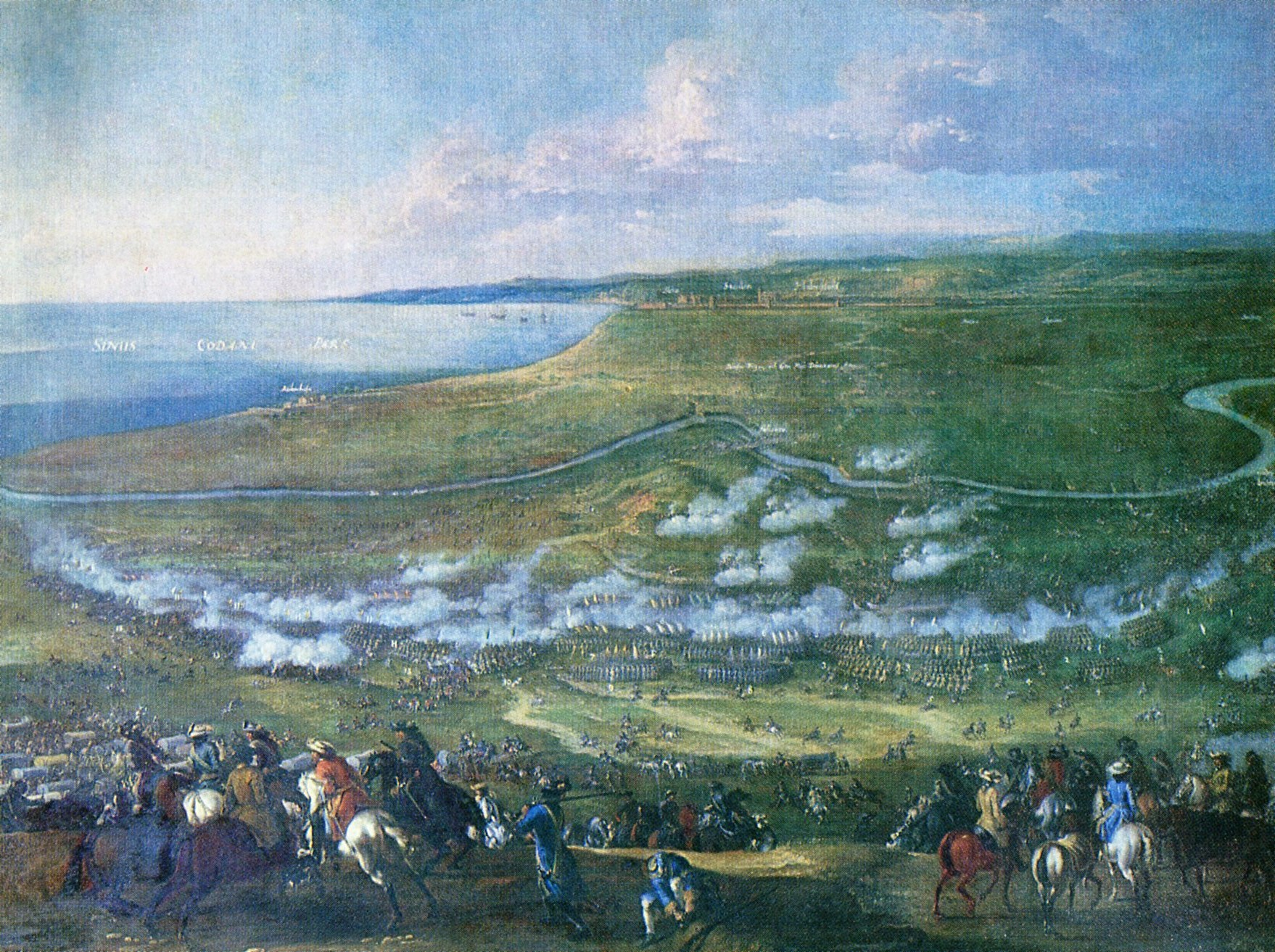
Slaghalm 1676

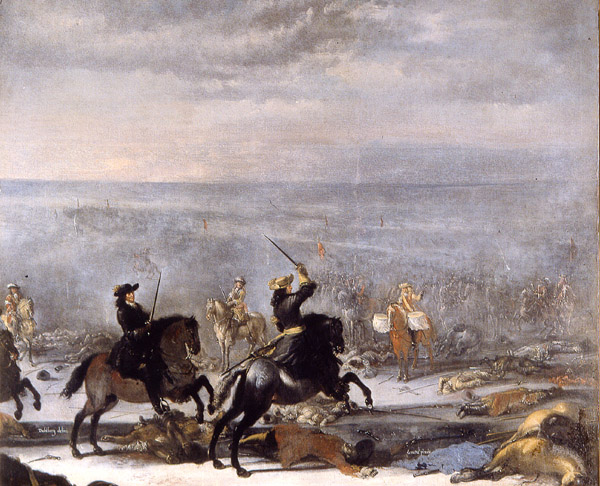
Charles XI, Battle of Lund

Events from the year 1676 in Sweden

== Incumbents ==
- Monarch – Charles XI

== Events ==
- 1 June - Danish victory in the Battle of Öland and Danish invasion of the Swedish province of Scania.
- Creation of the Snapphane movement to resist the Swedes in the province of Scania.
- Battle of Bysjön
- August 17 - Swedish victory in the Battle of Halmstad
- December 4 - Swedish victory in the Battle of Lund
- Åbo landtag

== Births ==
- Nils Reuterholm, governor (died 1756)
- Philip Johan von Strahlenberg, officer and geographer (died 1747)

== Deaths ==
- 29 April - Anna Zippel, alleged witch (born date unknown)
- 29 April - Brita Zippel, alleged witch (born date unknown)
- 1 June - Lorentz Creutz, government administrator, county governor (born 1615)
- June - Claes Uggla, officer (born 1614)
- July - Carl Gustaf Wrangel, commander (born 1613)
- August - Lars Stigzelius, archbishop (born 1598)
- 5 August - Malin Matsdotter, alleged witch (born 1613)
- November - Gävle Boy, notorious witch finder (born 1663)
