= Battle of Reinbek =

Engagement of the Great Northern War

- Part of the Great Northern War
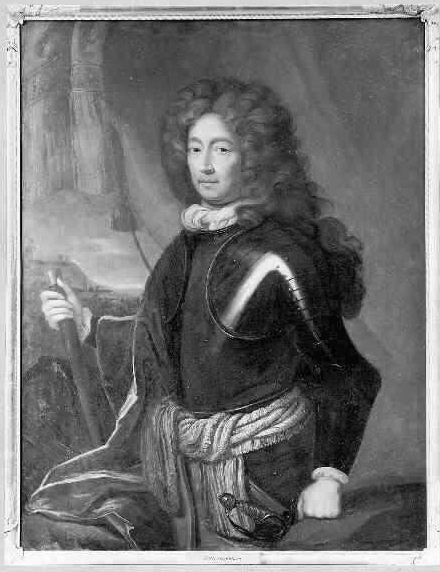
- The Swedish commander Nils Gyllenstierna
| Date | 19 May 1700 (O.S.); 20 May 1700 (Swedish calendar); 30 May 1700 (N.S.) |
| Location | Reinbek |
| Result | Swedish-Lüneburgian victory |

Belligerents
| (yes) Swedish Empire; Brunswick-Lüneburg | Denmark–Norway |

Commanders and leaders
| (Swedish Empire) Nils Gyllenstierna | (Denmark–Norway) Carl Rudolf |

Strength
| 5,000–7,000 men, 4 cannons | 2,000 men, 4 cannons |

Casualties and losses
- ~10

The Battle of Reinbek or Skirmish of Reinbek on 30 May 1700 (N.S.) was a small engagement at the river of Bille near Reinbek in Schleswig-Holstein, Germany, as a consequence of the Danish invasion of Holstein-Gottorp, earlier that year.

== Background ==
Combined Swedish-Hanoverian-Lüneburgian forces of 17,500 men, who were guarantors of peace by the treaty of Holstein-Gottorp along with England and the Netherlands, commanded by Nils Gyllenstierna, marched towards the 20,000 strong Danish army under Ferdinand Willem, Duke of Württemberg to relief the besieged Tönning. Danish forces of 5,600 men were positioned partly behind the river of Bille, in a 45 kilometer long defensive line, in an attempt to block them.

== Battle ==
Gyllenstierna, approaching with the bulk of his forces from the south—around 11,000 Swedes and Lüneburgians—split these in two; he marched towards 2,000 Danes with four cannons at Reinbek, under Carl Rudolf, Prince of Württemberg (the brother of Willem), with about 5,000-7,000 men of his own. The other section was ordered to go around and attack the Danish positions from the back. After reaching Reinbek, Gyllenstierna sent two Swedish battalions to the bridge, while four cannons were dragged up to the heights, by which a rather insignificant firefight commenced between the two sides. The fighting continued until dawn, when the Prince of Württemberg, fearing he would get outflanked, decided to destroy the bridge and withdraw with all of his forces.

== Aftermath ==
Only a fraction of the two armies had been engaged in the fighting and the losses sustained on both sides had barely reached ten men. The siege was lifted soon thereafter and, after a Swedish landing in Zealand on 4 August, the Danish king Frederick IV signed the Peace of Travendal on 18 August 1700.
