= 1682 in Sweden =

- Years in Sweden: 1679 1680 1681 1682 1683 1684 1685
- Centuries: 16th century · 17th century · 18th century
- Decades: 1650s 1660s 1670s 1680s 1690s 1700s 1710s
- Years: 1679 1680 1681 1682 1683 1684 1685

Events from the year 1682 in Sweden

== Incumbents ==
- Monarch – Charles XI

== Events ==
- The second Duellplakatet confirms the 1662 ban on duels with even more severity.
- Absolute monarchy is established when the Estates acknowledge the right of the monarch to write laws without their participation.
- The Great Reversion of the property of the nobility is placed entirely in the hands of the monarch.
- The theater company Dän Swänska Theatren is formed.
- The Allotment system reorganize the Swedish army system.
- Lund University is reopened after the war.
- Fyratijo små wijsor by Skogekär Bergbo.

== Births ==
- 17 June - Charles XII of Sweden, monarch (died 1718)
- Margareta Capsia, painter (died 1759)
- Gustavus Hesselius, painter (died 1755)

== Deaths ==
- - Elizabeth Carlsdotter Gyllenhielm, royal daughter and courtier (born 1622)
