= Gyldenstierne (noble family) =

Historic Scandinavian noble family

Gyldenstierne Gyllenstierna
- Uradel; Nobility
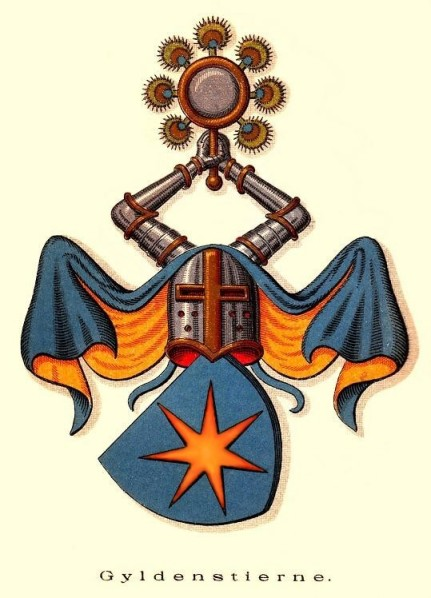
- Gyldenstierne coat of arms.
- Country: Denmark; Norway; Sweden
- Titles: Count; Baron; Lord
- Dissolution: 1729 (Denmark)

The Gyldenstjerne family, also spelled Gyldenstierne and in Swedish Gyllenstierna (lit. 'Golden Star'), is a Danish, Norwegian, and Swedish noble family divided into various branches and ranks. It is one of the oldest noble families in Scandinavia. The family surname appears, in the form Guildenstern, in Hamlet (see Rosencrantz and Guildenstern). The surname should not be confused with Gyldensteen ("Golden Stone"), the name of another short-lived Danish noble family, first recorded in 1717 and which became extinct in 1749.

The family has a prominent position in Danish, Norwegian, and Swedish history. It belonged to the higher nobility, and paradoxically, in Sweden it supported the absolute monarchy. The member with the highest standing was the noblewoman Christina Nilsdotter Gyllenstierna, who as Sten Sture the Younger's wife was regent consort of Sweden.

== History ==
=== Denmark ===
The oldest known man in the family is the knight Lord Nils Eriksson of Aagård in Jutland, who is mentioned in 1314 in relationship to Store Restrup Manor (Store Restrup Herregård) in Aalborg. He was the father of Lord Erik Nilsson of Ågård, who had a son Lord Nils Eriksson of Ågård. With this Nils's sons Knud, Peder, and Erik Nilssøner, the family was divided into three primary branches: Restrup, Ågård, and Demstrup. The family in Denmark became extinct in 1729.

=== Norway ===
The Danish knight Mogens Henriksen Gyldenstierne († 1569) was from 1527 feudal lord of Akershus. In 1532, he was succeeded at Akershus Fortress by his relative Erik Olufsen Gyldenstierne († 1536). The Danish minister Axel Gyldenstierne (ca. 1542–1603) was Governor-general of Norway during the period 1588–1601.

=== Sweden ===
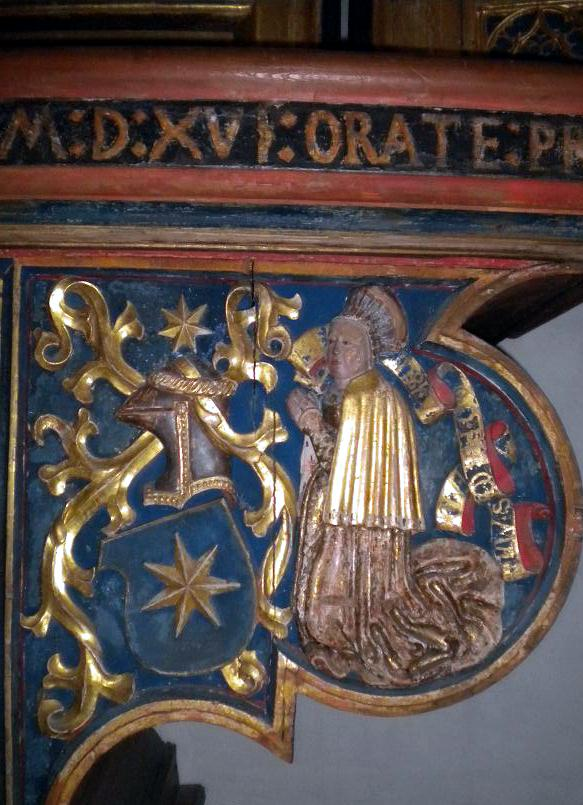
The canting coat of arms of Gyllenstierna, and an illustration of Christina Nilsdotter Gyllenstierna.

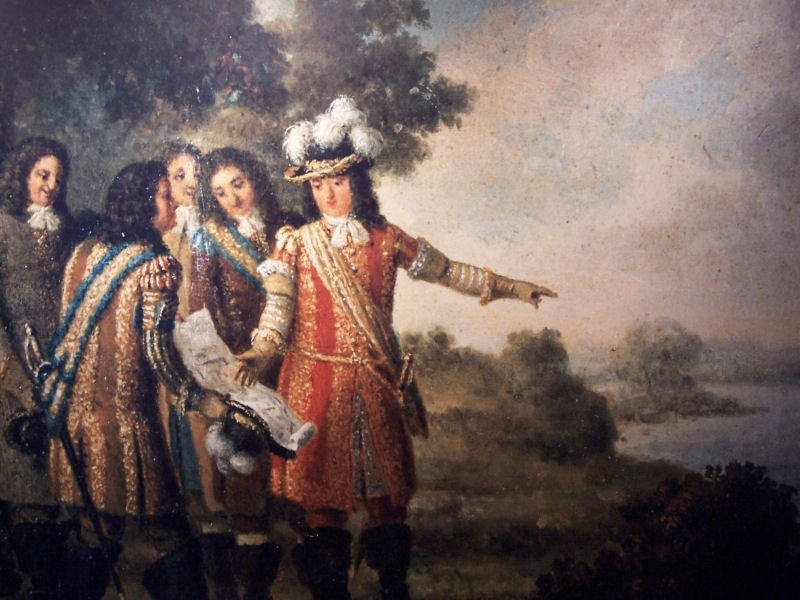
This painting illustrates King Charles XI together with his advisors, whereof Johan Göransson Gyllenstierna.

In the first part of the 15th century, the family came to Sweden with Erik Eriksson of Fågelvik, who after a while married Kristina Karlsdotter (1432 – ca 1500), the daughter of King Charles VIII of Sweden. Among their children was Nils Eriksson Gyllenstierna (d. 1495), who was the father of Christina Nilsdotter Gyllenstierna, regent consort of Sweden.

In 1569, Nils Göransson (1526–1601) was elevated to a baronial estate as baronial Gyllenstierna af Lundholm. Lundholmen Manor is located in Vrigstad parish within Jönköping. Members of this branch of the family are still living in Sweden. After Scania was included in Sweden by the Treaty of Roskilde in 1658, a now extinct branch of the Danish family was introduced to the House of Nobility. The Vinstrop branch became barons in 1651, while four branches were given the rank of count. All these are extinct.

== Coat of arms ==
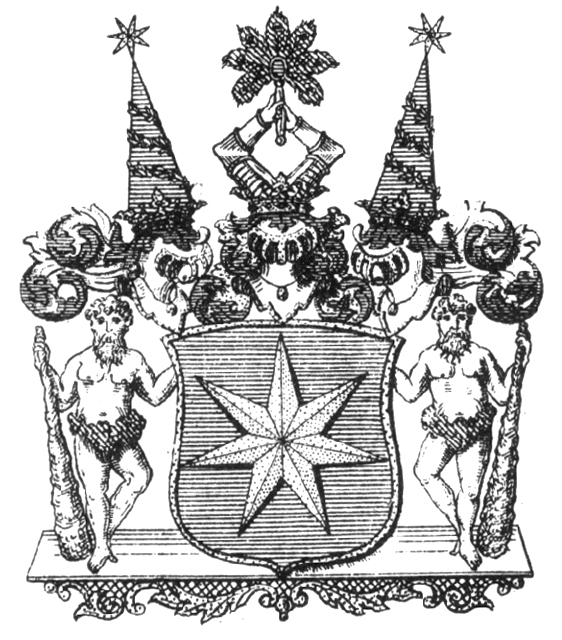
Counts of Björkesund.

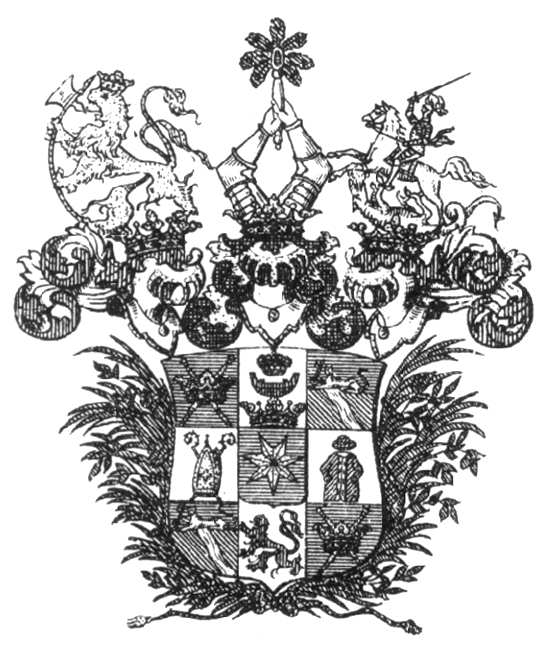
Counts of Eriksberg.

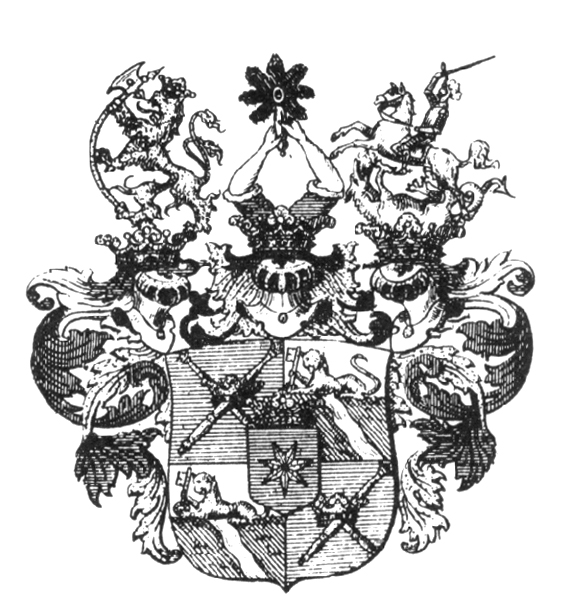
Counts of Steninge.

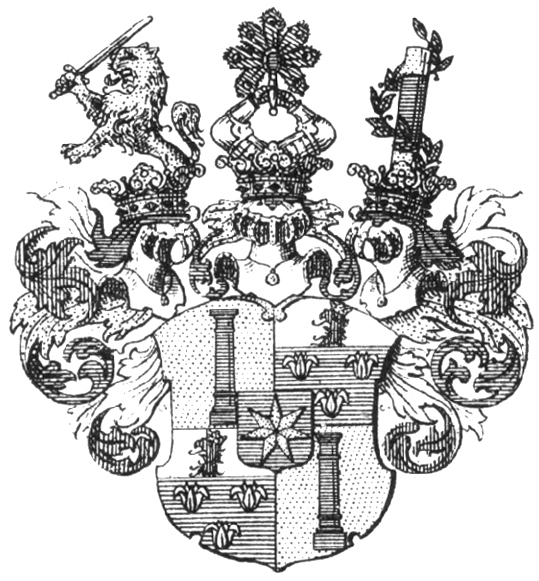
Counts of Fogelvik.
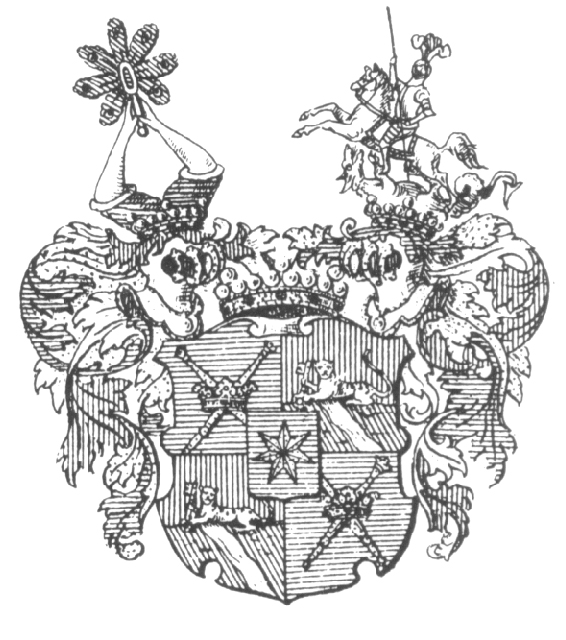
Gyllenstierna of Uleborg.

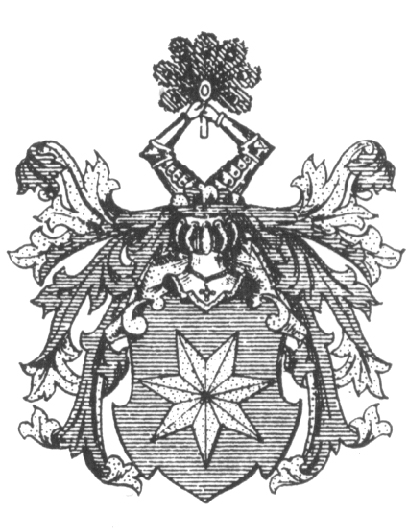
Gyllenstierna of Nynäs.

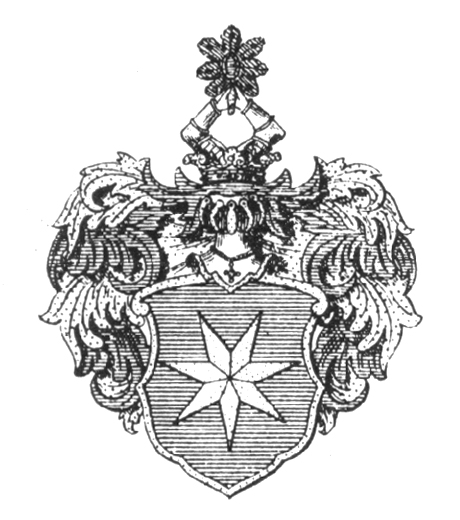
Gyllenstierna of Svaneholm.

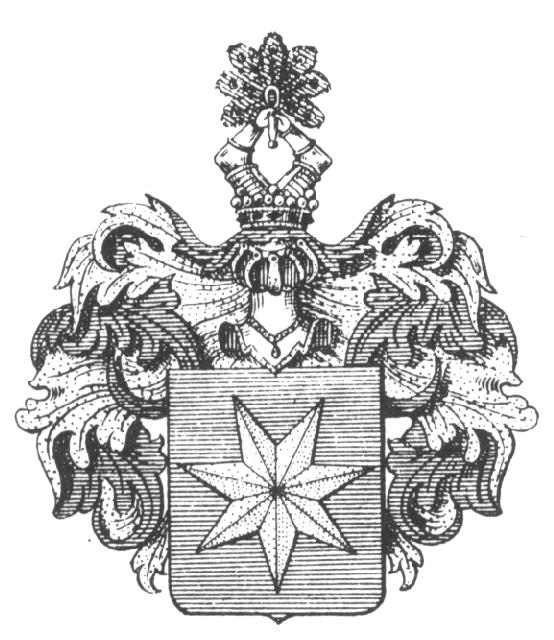
Gyllenstierna of Lundholm.

== See also ==
- Danish nobility
- Norwegian nobility
- Swedish nobility
- Gøye family

== Sources ==
- A. Thiset og P.L. Wittrup: Nyt dansk Adelslexikon, Copenhagen 1904
- Sven Tito Achen: Danske adelsvåbener, Copenhagen 1973
