= 1763 in Sweden =

Events from the year 1763 in Sweden

== Incumbents ==
- Monarch – Adolf Frederick

== Events ==
- 15 February - The end of the Seven Years' War.
- - An economic crisis results in the bankruptcy of several manufacturers.
- - Sweden and Great Britain resume diplomatic contacts after fifteen years of estrangement.
- - The new poor care law states that every congregation is responsible to provide for the poor in the parish.
- - The first Chinese Pavilion at Drottningholm is dismantled and the second is built.
- - Ode öfver själens styrka by Gustaf Fredrik Gyllenborg
- - Billingsfors Church is completed.

== Births ==
- 26 January – Charles XIV John, king of Sweden and Norway (died 1844)
- 29 March – Eberhard von Vegesack, Swedish army officer (died 1818)
- 12 December – Margareta Alströmer, singer and painter, member of the Royal Swedish Academy of Arts and of the Royal Swedish Academy of Music (died 1816)
- Jöns Peter Hemberg – member of parliament and founder of Skåne's Private Bank. (died 1834)

== Deaths ==
- 24 March – Catherine Charlotte De la Gardie, countess and courtier (born 1723)
- 30 May – Gustaviana Schröder, singer (born 1701)
- 29 June – Hedvig Charlotta Nordenflycht, writer, feminist and salong hostess (born 1718)
- 11 July – Peter Forsskål, explorer, orientalist, naturalist and an apostle of Carl Linnaeus (born 1732)
- 12 August – Olof von Dalin, poet (born 1708)
- 17 December – George Bogislaus Staël von Holstein, baron and field marshal (born 1685)
