= Elin Såger =

Finnish businessperson (1614–1669)

Elin Såger (1614–1669) was a Finnish businessperson.

== Biography ==
Såger was born in Turku where her father, Johan Såger (died in 1632) was a successful merchant. In 1631, she married merchant Peter Thorwöste who operated ironworks. He founded Ruukki at Fiskars in 1649.

Såger owned and managed a major trading company in Turku and three ironworks after the death of her spouse in 1659. She has been referred to as one of the most financially influential businesswomen in Finnish history.
