= Georg Heinrich von Görtz =

German politician (1668–1719)

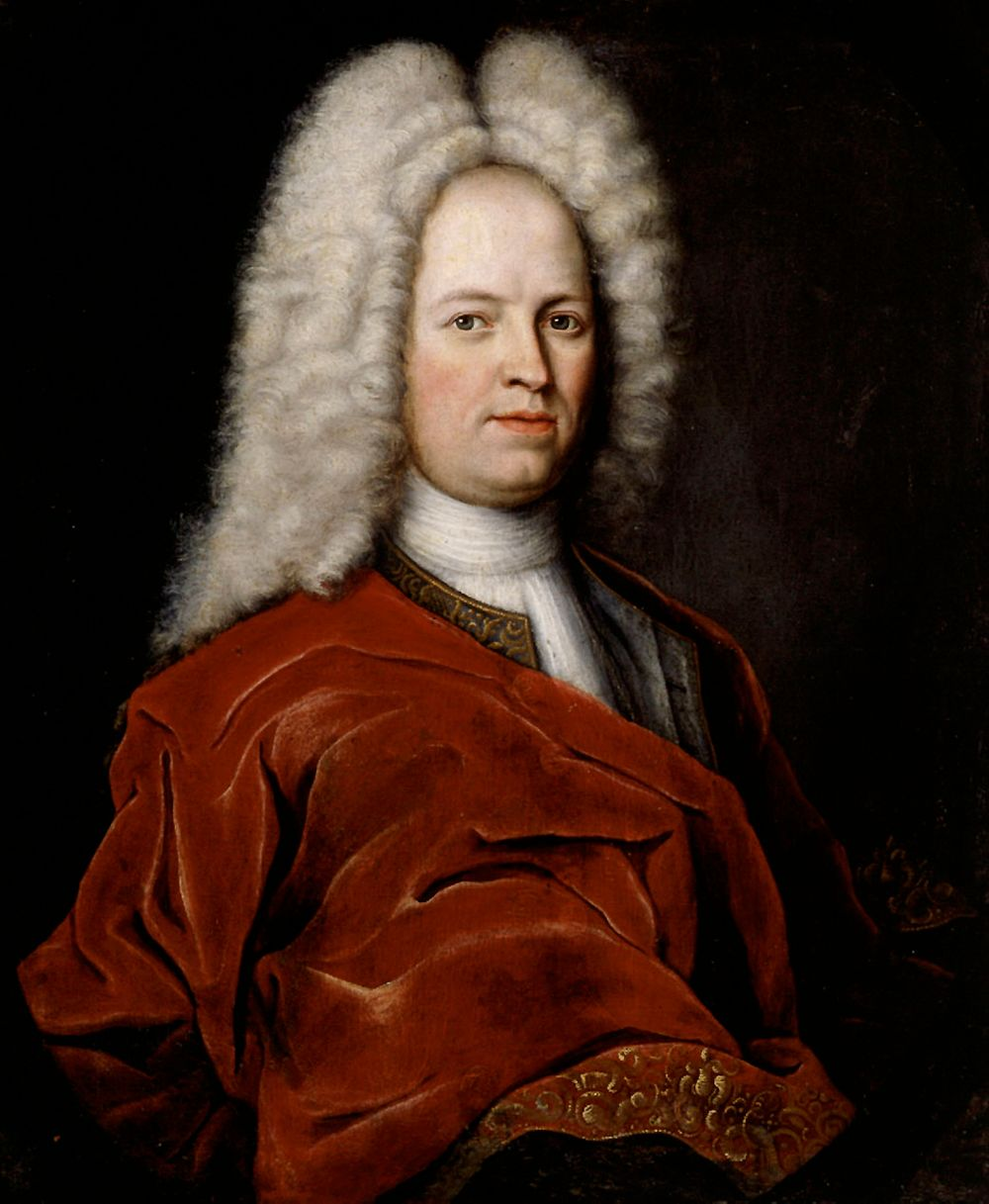
- Görtz by Lucas von Breda

Chief minister of Charles XII
- In office 1716–1718
- Monarch: Charles XII

Holstein-Gottorp's diplomatic representative to Charles XII
- In office 1718–1718
- Monarch: Charles XII

Political leader of Holstein-Gottorp
- In office 1703–1718
- Monarch: Hedvig Sophia

Geheimrat
- In office 1702–1703
- Monarch: Hedvig Sophia

Personal details
- Born: Georg Heinrich von Görtz; 1668 Franconia, Germany
- Died: 19 February 1719 (aged 50–51) Stockholm, Sweden
- Resting place: Schlitz, Hesse; Germany
- Spouse: Christine Magdalene Reventlow (m. 1705)
- Children: 2
- Education: Helmstedt, Halle-Wittenberg, Jena

Georg Heinrich von Görtz (also spelled Goertz; 1668 – 19 February 1719) was a German Reichsfreiherr (baron), statesman and diplomat who played a prominent role in Swedish politics during the final years of the reign of King Charles XII.

Görtz began his career as chamberlain to Frederick IV, Duke of Holstein-Gottorp. After the duke was killed at the battle of Kliszów (1702), Görtz became a geheimrat in the Holstein-Gottorp government under Duchess Hedvig Sophia (Charles XII’s sister) and later in the regency for her son, Duke Charles Frederick. Seeking to strengthen Holstein-Gottorp against Denmark–Norway, he pursued diplomatic efforts to isolate Denmark by courting alliances with Russia, Prussia and Saxony.

When Charles XII returned from the Ottoman Empire to Stralsund in 1714, he drew Görtz into closer counsel. Impressed by Görtz’s financial and diplomatic acumen, the king granted him wide authority. Görtz introduced a wartime economic policy that placed all trade and exports under strict state control in an attempt to stabilise Sweden's finances during the Great Northern War. As Charles XII’s chief minister from 1716 to 1718, he launched several diplomatic initiatives to improve Sweden’s position, including peace talks with Russia at the Congress of Åland in 1718, where he headed the Swedish delegation.

Following Charles XII’s death on 30 November 1718, Sweden’s political landscape changed. On 2 December Görtz was arrested on the orders of Crown Prince Frederick, charged with defamation, and condemned to death after a summary trial without the opportunity for defence. He was beheaded in Stockholm on 19 February 1719. Living in a turbulent period of Swedish history, Görtz's legacy as minister and diplomat has been controversial.

== Early life ==
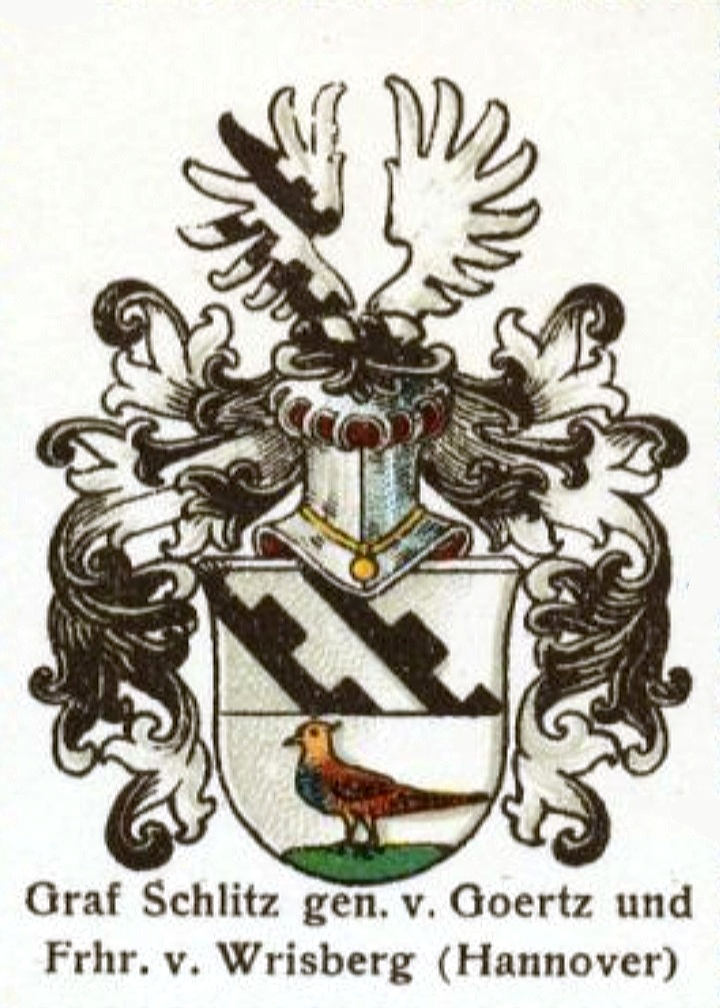
Coat of arms of the Schlitz genannt von Goertz family

Born into an old and prominent German noble family from Fulda, he was the eldest of four sons of Philipp Friedrich von Schlitz gen. von Görtz (1641-1695) by his first wife, Juliane von Minnigerode (1652-1687). From his father's second marriage to Sophia Philippine von Ilten (1669-1732), he had three more half siblings.

== Career ==
He entered the Holstein-Gottorp service, and after the death of the duchess Hedwig Sophia, Charles XII of Sweden's sister, became very influential during the minority of her son Duke Charles Frederick. His earlier policy aimed at strengthening Holstein-Gottorp at the expense of Denmark. With this object, during Charles XII's stay at Altranstädt (1706–1707), he tried to divert the king's attention to the Holstein question, and six years later, when the Swedish commander, Magnus Stenbock, crossed the Elbe, Görtz rendered him as much assistance as was compatible with not openly breaking with Denmark, even going so far as to surrender the fortress of Tönning to the Swedes. Görtz next attempted to undermine the grand alliance against Sweden by negotiating with Russia, Prussia and Saxony for the purpose of isolating Denmark, or even of turning the arms of the allies against her, a task by no means impossible in view of the strained relations between Denmark and the tsar. The plan foundered, however, on the refusal of Charles XII to save the rest of his German domains by ceding Stettin to Prussia. Another simultaneous plan of procuring the Swedish crown for Duke Charles Frederick also came to nought. Görtz first suggested the marriage between the duke of Holstein and the tsarevna Anne of Russia, and negotiations were begun in Saint Petersburg with that object.

Görtz was also prominently involved in negotiating the terms of Stenbock's surrender in the Siege of Tönning, 1713.

== Charles XII ==
On the arrival of Charles XII from Turkey at Stralsund in 1714, Görtz was the first to visit him, and emerged from his presence chief minister or "grand-vizier" as the Swedes preferred to call him, whose absolute devotion to the Swedish king took no account of the intense wretchedness of the Swedish nation. Görtz, himself a man of uncommon audacity, seems to have been fascinated by the heroic element in Charles's nature and was determined, if possible, to save him from his difficulties. He owed his extraordinary influence to the fact that he was the only one of Charles's advisers who believed, or pretended to believe, that Sweden was still far from exhaustion, or at any rate had a sufficient reserve of power to give support to an energetic diplomacy - Charles's own opinion, in fact.

== Swedish plenipotentiary ==
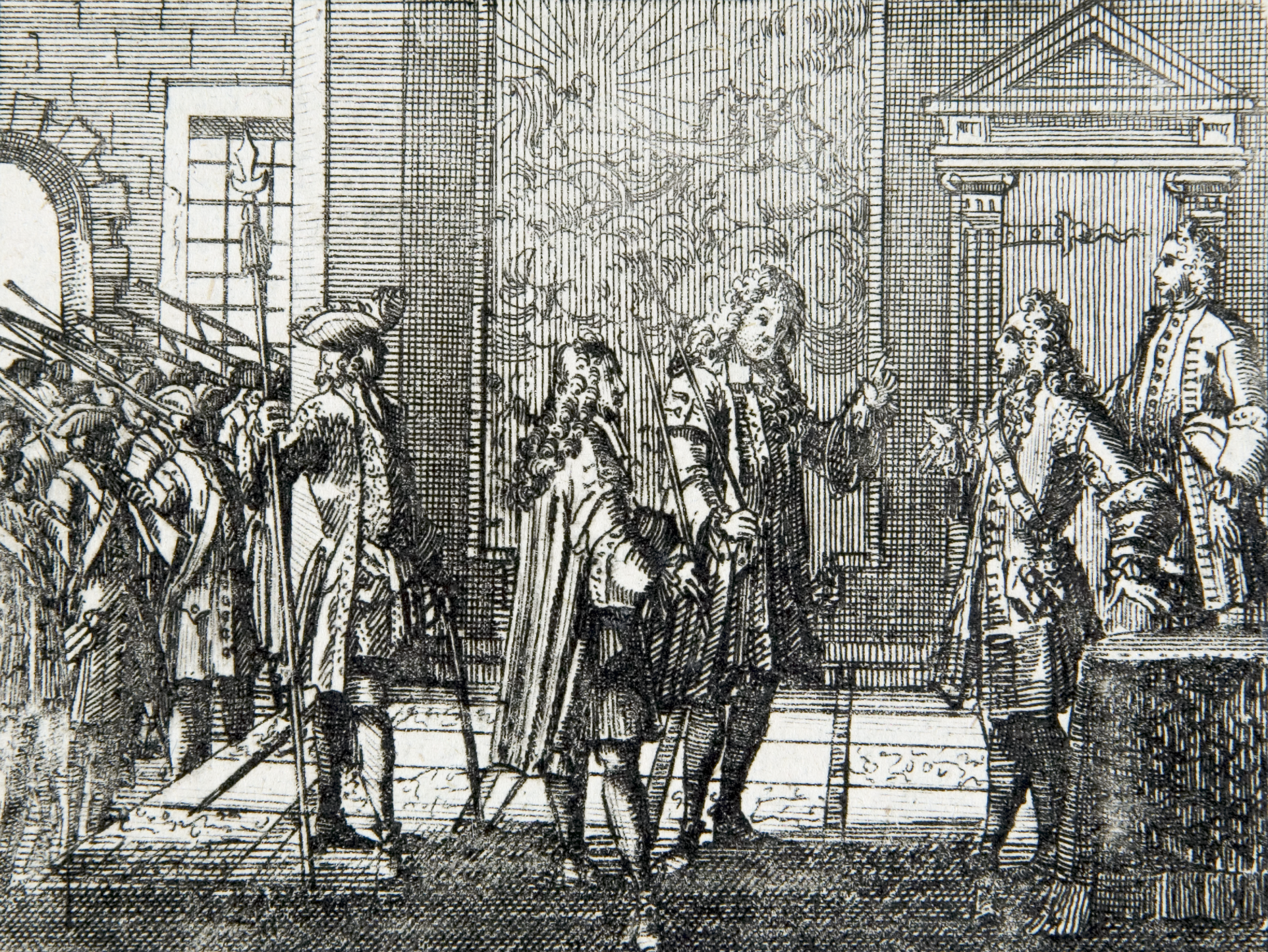
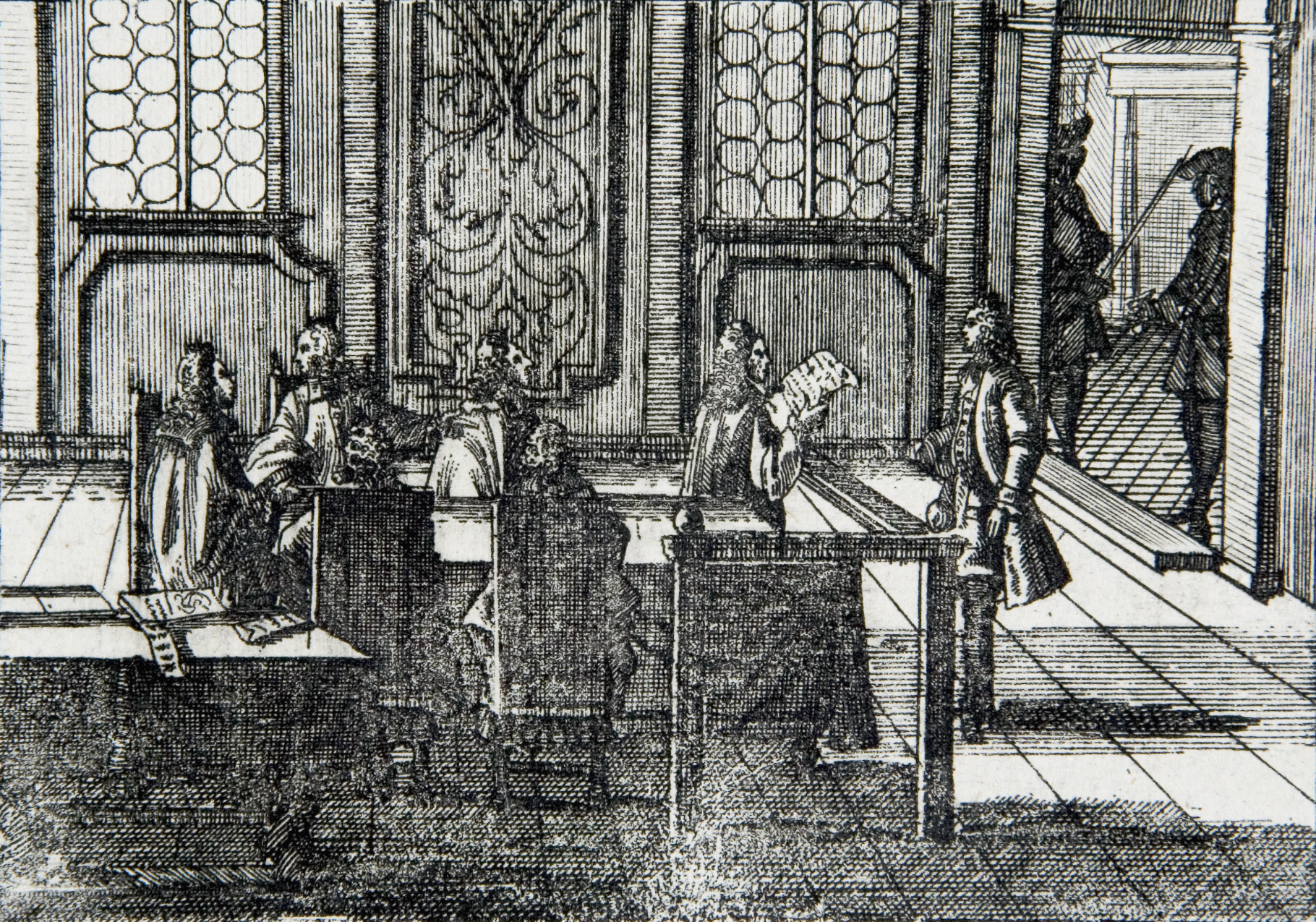
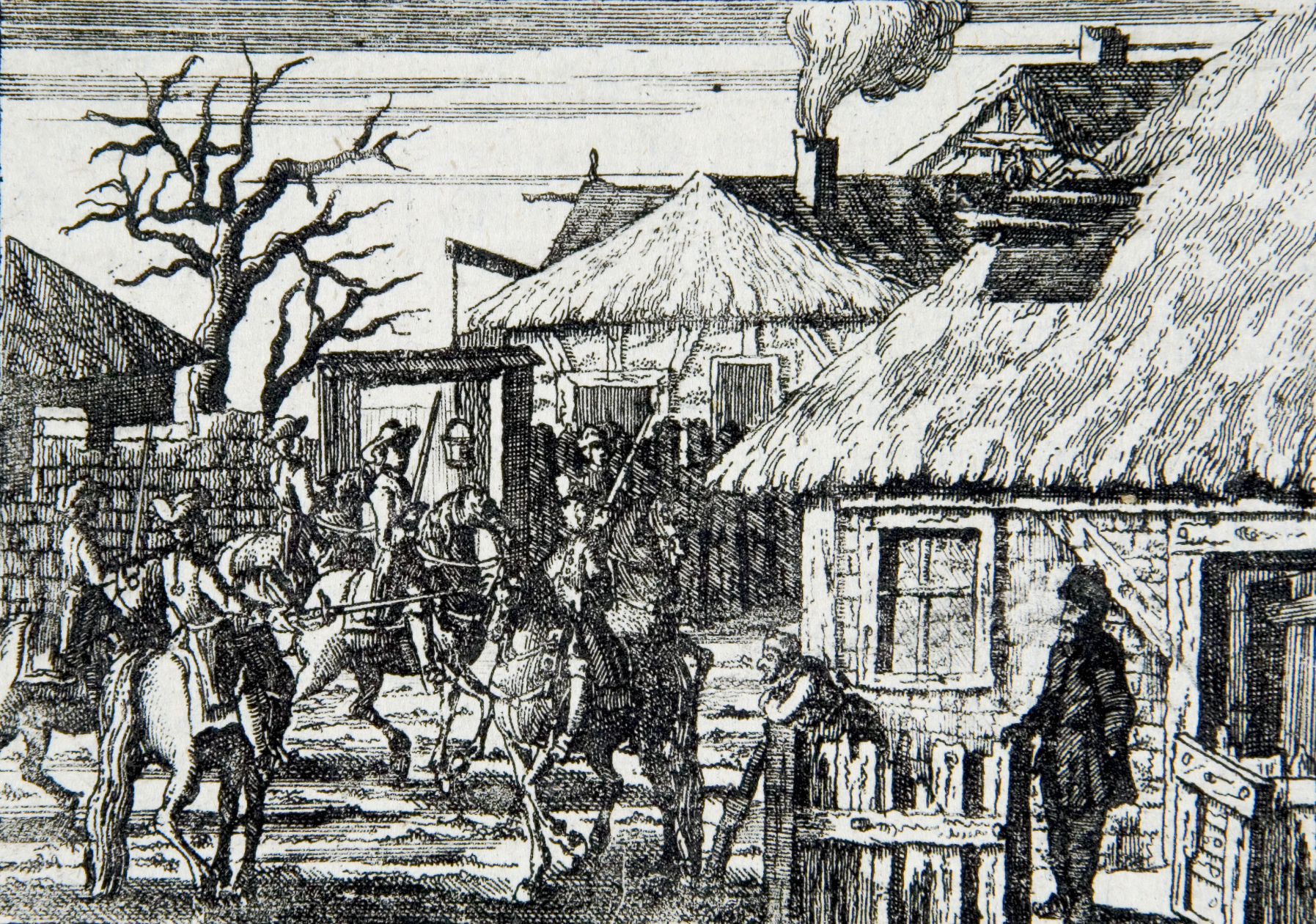
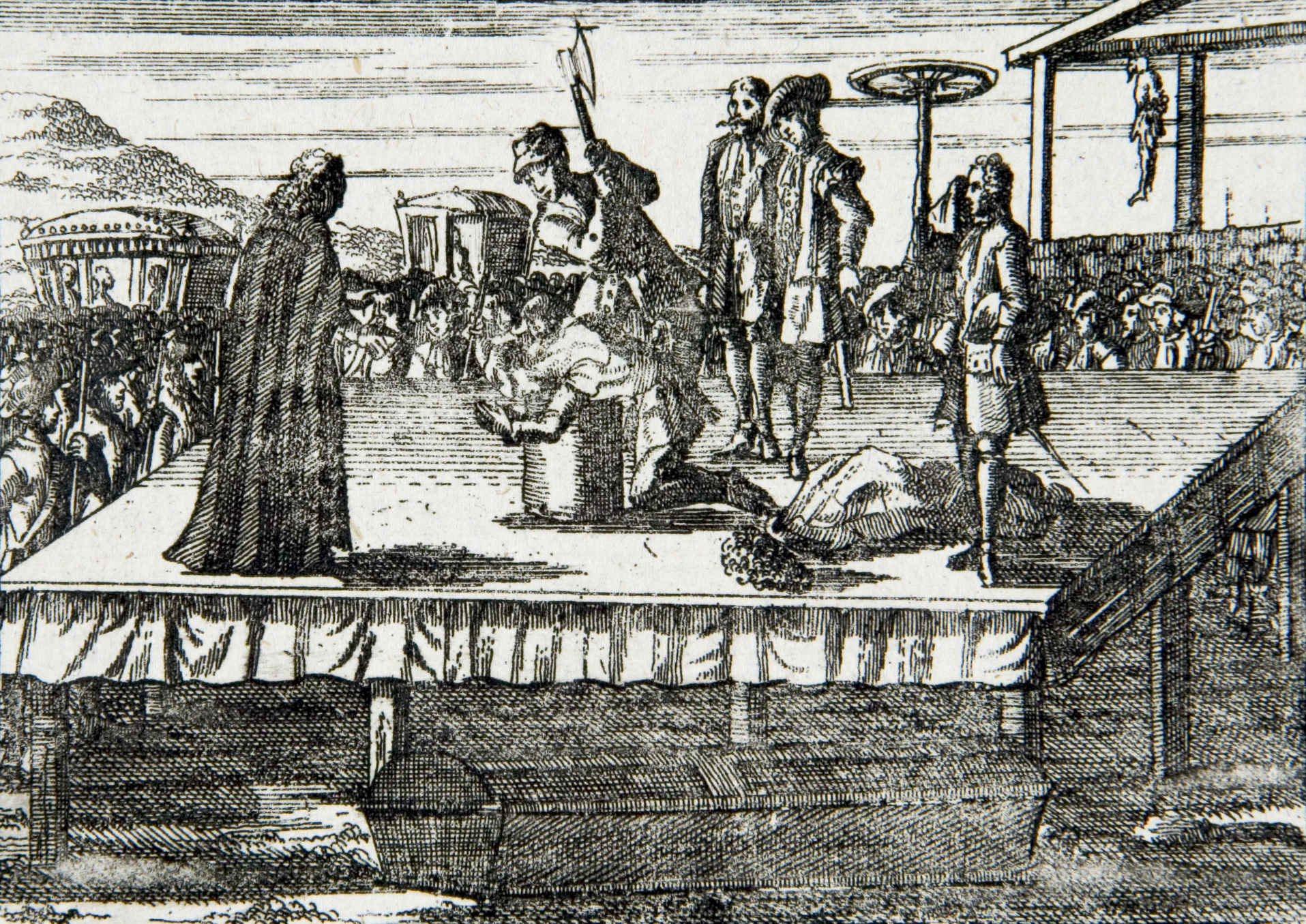
Georg Heinrich von Görtz, from the time of his arrest and trial, to him being escorted and executed

Görtz’s position, however, was highly peculiar. Ostensibly, he was only the Holstein minister at Charles's court, in reality he was everything in Sweden except a Swedish subject - finance minister, plenipotentiary to foreign powers, factotum, and responsible to the king alone, though he had not a line of instructions. His chief financial action was to debase the currency by issuing copper tokens, intended to be redeemable in better times. By the end of 1718 it seemed as if Görtz’s system could not go on much longer, and the hatred of the Swedes towards him was so intense and universal that they blamed him for Charles XII's tyranny as well as for his own. Görtz hoped, however, to conclude peace with at least some of Sweden’s numerous enemies before the crash came and then, by means of fresh combinations, to restore Sweden to her rank as a great power.

== Downfall ==
It is often said that in pursuit of his "system" Görtz displayed a genius for diplomacy which would have done honour to a Metternich or a Talleyrand. He desired peace with Russia first of all, and at the Congress of Åland even obtained relatively favourable terms, only to have them rejected by his stubbornly optimistic master. Simultaneously, Görtz was negotiating with Cardinal Alberoni and with the Whigs in England; but all his combinations collapsed with the sudden death of Charles XII. The whole fury of the Swedish nation instantly fell upon Görtz. After a trial before a special commission, in which he was not permitted to have any legal assistance or the use of writing materials, he was condemned to decapitation and promptly executed. Though some historians argue that Görtz deserved his fate for "unnecessarily making himself the tool of an unheard-of despotism," his death is considered by other historians to be a judicial murder, and some historians even regard him as a political martyr.

== Personal life ==
In 1705, he was married to Christine Magdalene von Reventlow (1682-1713), widow of Kai von Rantzau (1650-1704), daughter of Detlev von Reventlow-Reedtz (1654-1701) and his wife, Dorothea von Ahlefeldt (1648-1720). They had two daughters:

- Georgine von Schlitz gen. von Görtz (1708-1787) ⚭ Johann Friedrich von Bardenfleth (d. 1736) ⚭ Friedrich von Eyben (d. 1787)
- Juliana von Schlitz gen. von Görtz (1713-1750) ⚭ Hieronymus Wigand von Laffert (1686-1765)
