= 1681 in Sweden =

Events from the year 1681 in Sweden

== Incumbents ==
- Monarch – Charles XI

== Events ==
- The city of Sundsvall burns down.
- The court of the Great Reversion begins its activity and starts its confiscations of the property of the nobility.
- Twelve Jews convert to Christianity in the German Church in Stockholm, which attracts so great attention and propaganda value that the members of the royal family attends as witnesses.

== Births ==
- Hedvig Sophia of Sweden, princess (died 1708)
- Göran Silfverhielm, Swedish Field Marshal.
- Carl Henrik Wrangel

== Deaths ==
- Nicodemus Tessin the Elder, architect (born 1615)
