= 1614 in Sweden =

Events from the year 1614 in Sweden

== Incumbents ==
- Monarch – Gustaf II Adolf

== Events ==
- Armistice with Poland.
- Svea Court of Appeal
- Alliance with the Netherlands.
- Battle of Bronnicy
- Swedish occupation of Gdov.

== Births ==
- Gustaf Otto Stenbock, soldier and politician (died 1685)
- Bengt Skytte, courtier and diplomat
- Elin Såger, businessperson

== Deaths ==
- Ebba Stenbock
