= 1615 in Sweden =

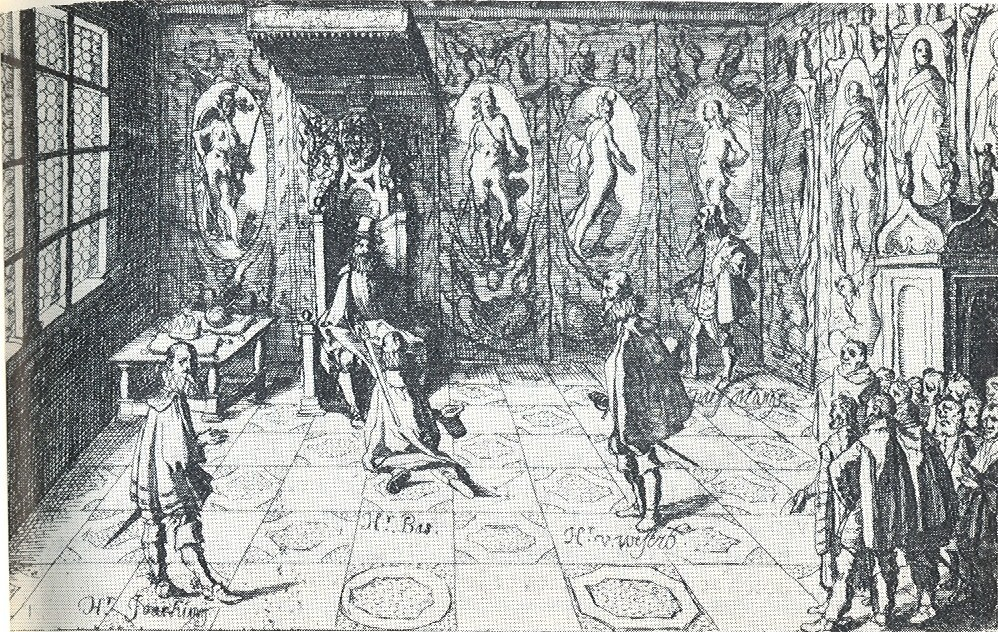

Events from the year 1615 in Sweden

== Incumbents ==
- Monarch – Gustaf II Adolf

== Events ==
- Wedding between Catherine of Sweden, Countess Palatine of Kleeburg and John Casimir, Count Palatine of Kleeburg.
- Swedish Siege of Pskov.

== Births ==
- Klas Hansson Bjelkenstjerna, naval officer and civil servant (died 1662)
- Lorentz Creutz, government administrator (died 1676)

== Deaths ==
- 10 January - Gustaf Brahe, official (b. 1558)
- Evert Horn, soldier (born 1585)
