= 1551 in Sweden =

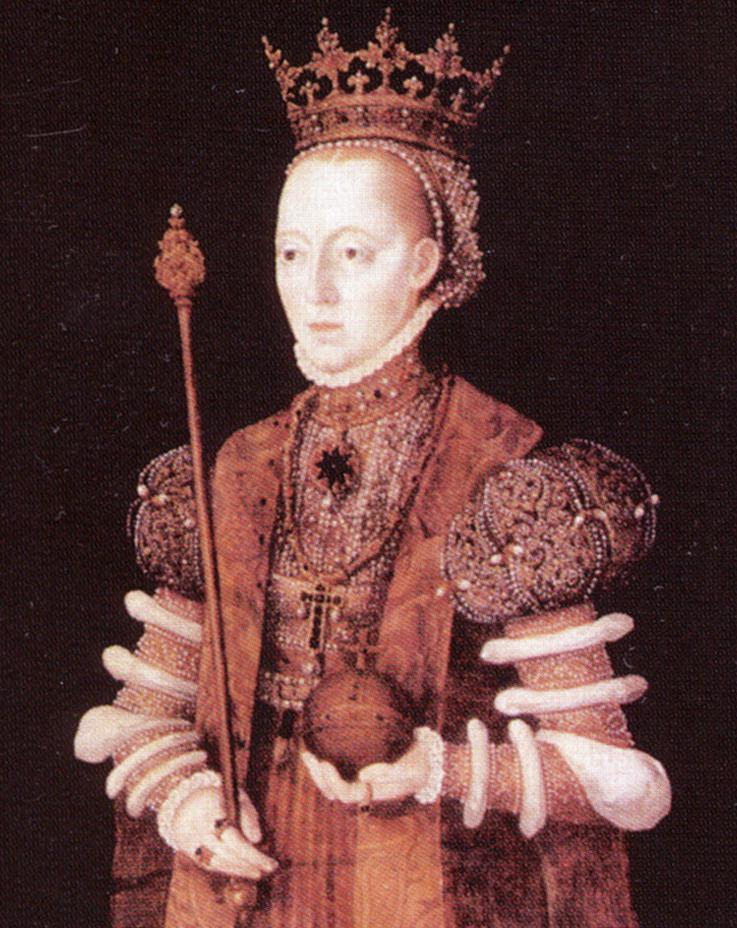
Margaret of Sweden (1536) by Johan Baptista van Uther

Events from the year 1551 in Sweden

== Incumbents ==
- Monarch – Gustav I
- Queen - Margaret Leijonhufvud

== Events ==
- Georg Norman, a German administrator who had been influential in the Swedish Reformation and government reorganisation, was appointed as an ambassador.
- King Gustav Vasa ordered the arrest and prosecution of individuals suspected of murdering his secretary using poison and sorcery. While the trials did not fully proceed in 1551, it marked a notable moment in the history of Swedish witch trials.

== Deaths ==
- Queen Margaret Leijonhufvud, the second wife of King Gustav I, died of pneumonia on August 26, 1551, at Tynnelsö Castle. She was a significant figure as an advisor to the king and mother to many of his children.
