= Sponvika =

Village in Halden municipality, Norway

Coordinates: 59°06′N 11°14′E

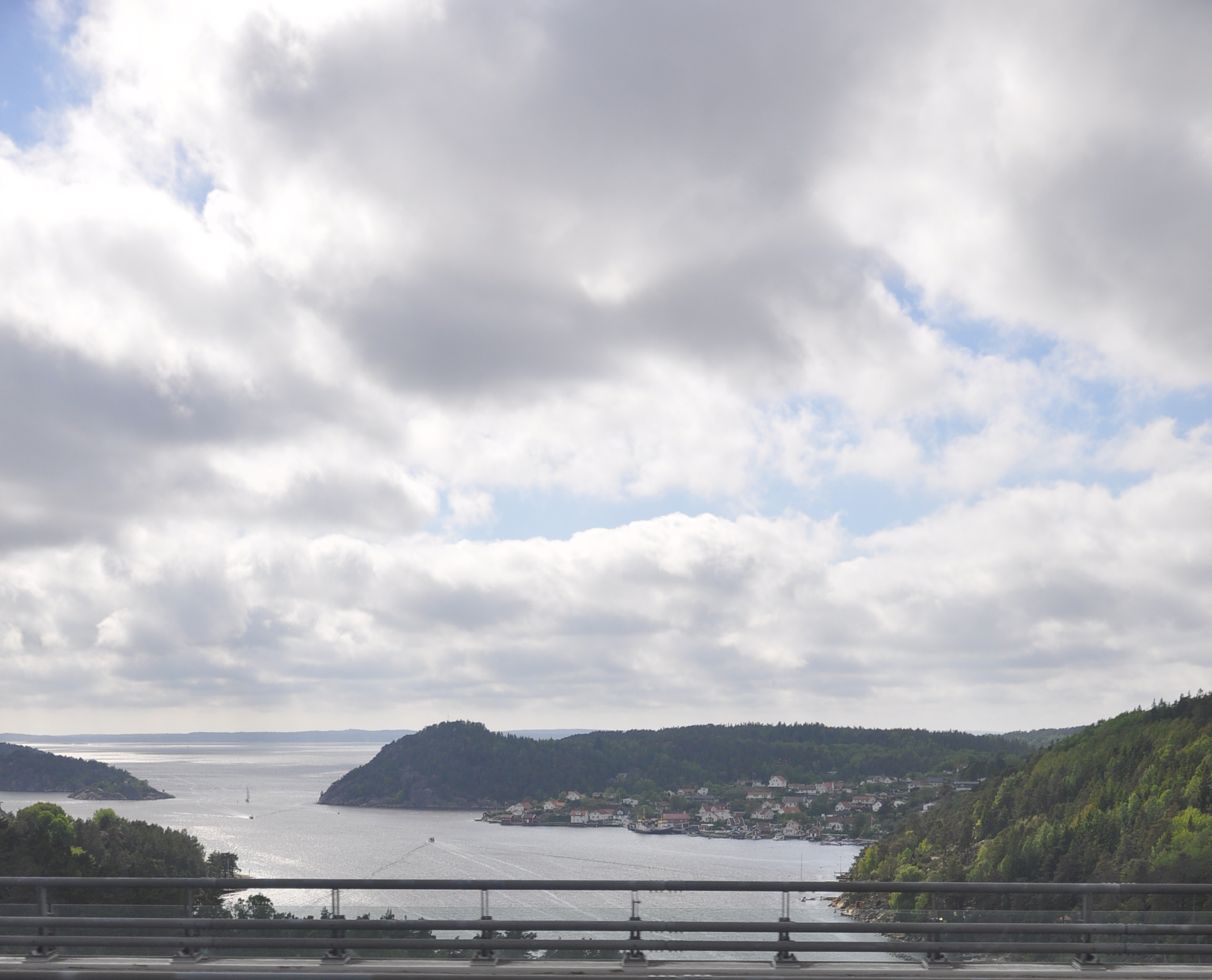

Sponvika is a village in Halden municipality, Norway. Its population in 2006 was 413.
