= 1687 in Sweden =

Events from the year 1687 in Sweden

== Incumbents ==
- Monarch – Charles XI

== Events ==
- Eric Dahlbergh becomes Governor of Jönköping County.
- February 7 - The Arjeplog blasphemy trial begins against Erik Eskilsson and Amund Thorsson for maintaining their practice of Sami shamanism during the Christianization of the Sami. Both were acquitted of all charges after agreeing to convert to Christianity.
- Midsommardagen (midsummer’s day), June 24th, 1867, an enormous copper mine in Falun collapsed while everyone was at the midsummer celebration, so it claimed no lives.
- Lasse Cock elected to Assembly.

== Births ==
- Hedvig Elisabet Strömfelt, royal governess (died 1751)
- February 23 – Gustaf Otto Douglas, Swedish mercenary of Scottish descent (d. 1771)
- October 17 – Frederick Coyett, Swedish noble and Dutch colonial administrator (b. 1615)
- October 24 – Maria Euphrosyne of Zweibrücken, Swedish princess (b. 1625)
- December 29 – Canutus Hahn, Swedish bishop (b. 1633)

== Deaths ==
- 24 October- Countess Palatine Maria Eufrosyne of Zweibrücken, princess (born 1625)
