= 1683 in Sweden =

Events from the year 1683 in Sweden

== Incumbents ==
- Monarch – Charles XI

== Events ==
- Orpolapsen vaikerrus by Maria Simointytär, first published poem by a female in the province of Finland

== Births ==
- 25 February - Jakob Benzelius, Archbishop of Uppsala in the Church of Sweden (died 1747)
- October - Charlotta von Liewen, politically active countess (died 1735)
- Date unknown - Ulrika Eleonora Stålhammar, famous cross dressing soldier (died 1733)
- Date unknown - Anna Maria Thelott, engraver and woodcut-artist (died 1710)
- Gustav, Prince of Sweden: Lived from 1683 to 1685

== Deaths ==
- 16 November - Margareta Huitfeldt, landowner and donor (born 1608)
- Bengt Skytte, courtier and diplomat (born 1614)
- Birgitta Durell, industrialist (born 1619)
