= Battle of Høland =

Minor battle of the Great Northern War

- Part of the Great Northern War
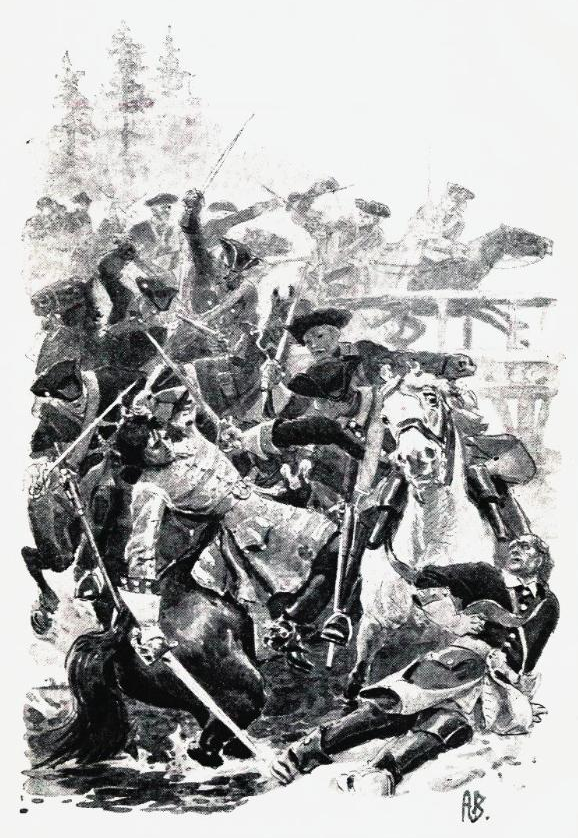
- Battle of Høland, illustration by Andreas Bloch
Date	9 March 1716
Location	Høland, Norway
Result	Swedish victory

Belligerents
Swedish Empire	Denmark-Norway

Commanders and leaders
Charles XII	(Denmark–Norway) Ulrik Christian Kruse (POW)

Strength
650 men	300 men

Casualties and losses
28 killed and wounded	164 killed, wounded and captured

The Battle of Høland (Swedish: Slaget vid Høland) was two minor skirmishes that were fought on 9 March 1716 in Høland, Norway as a part of the 1716 Swedish invasion of Norway, during the Great Northern War.

== Battle ==
Charles XII of Sweden rode with a force of 650 men in order to capture a Norwegian party stationed at Høland. The Norwegian troops were taken completely off guard and forced to surrender, resulting in 75 men being captured, while only a few managed to escape. After receiving news of the garrison's defeat, Norwegian general Ulrik Christian Kruse decided to send a force of his own consisting of 216 troops in order to aid the ones captured at Høland.

After arriving at Høland, Kruse launched an attack that managed to surprise the Swedish troops. However, after overcoming the initial shock of the attack, the Swedes managed to regroup and launch a successful counterattack against the Norwegians. By the end of the engagement, the Swedes had suffered at least 28 killed and wounded. On the Norwegian side, Kruse was captured along with 10 of his men, 31 Norwegian soldiers were killed and 47 more wounded.

== Aftermath ==
Following the victory, a good opportunity presented itself for Charles and his men to quickly march further into Norwegian territory and end the campaign in a victory for Sweden. However, a snow blizzard would end this opportunity and they would instead be stuck in Høland for some days.
