= Fågelvik Manor =

Coordinates: 58°07′22″N 16°42′14″E

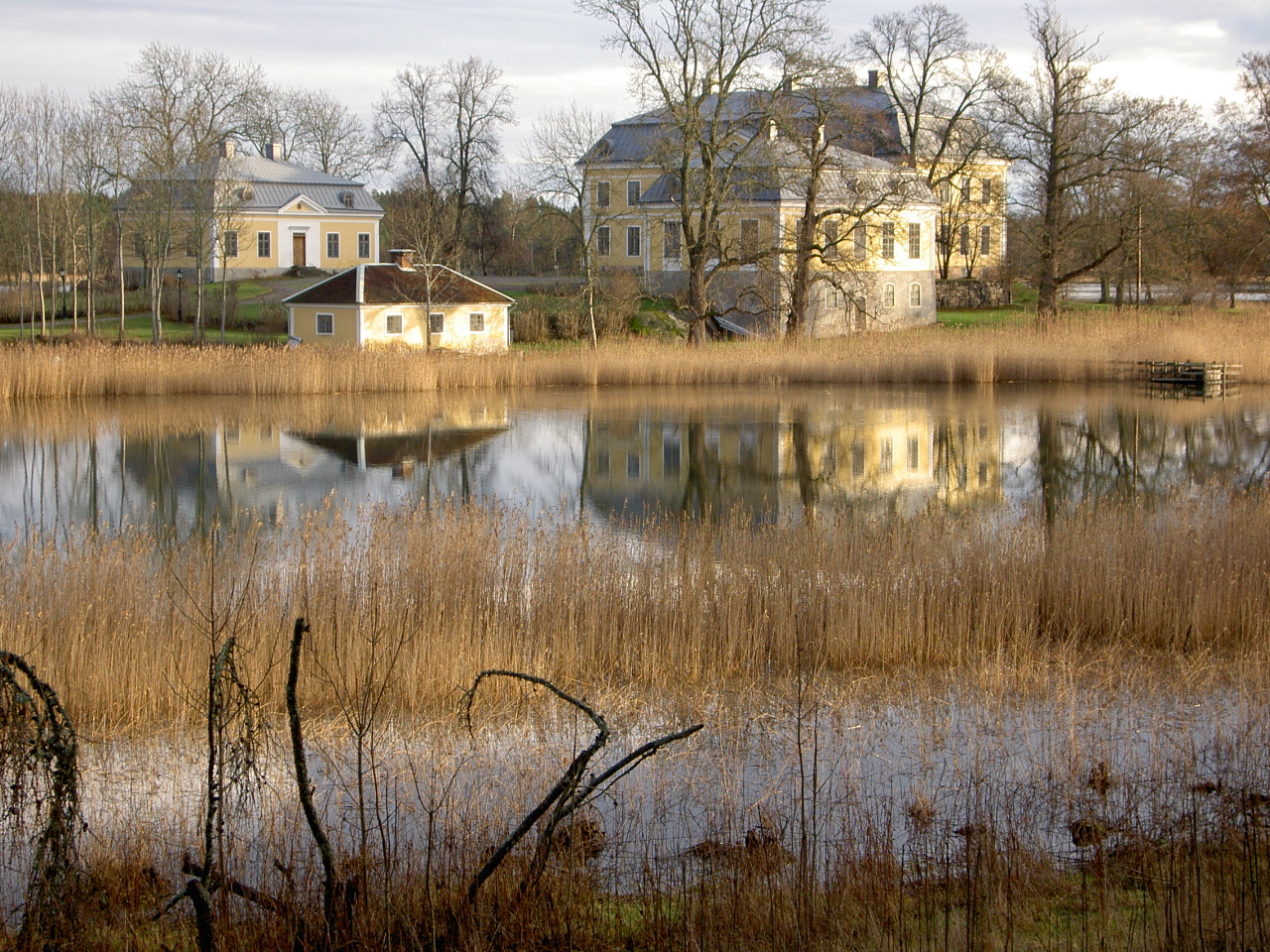
- Fågelvik Manor in 2007
- Interactive map of the Fågelvik Manor area

General information
- Type: Manor house
- Location: Valdemarsvik Municipality, Sweden

Fågelvik Manor (Swedish: Fågelviks herrgård) is a manor house in Valdemarsvik Municipality, Sweden. Once a castle building, the remains of the first building on the site date to the 1300s.

== History ==
The estate is mentioned in written sources for the first time in the late 14th century. At one point it belonged to Karl Ulfsson, Lord High Constable of Sweden. In 1429 it became the property of King Charles VIII of Sweden. After his death it passed to his daughter and through her marriage to the Gyllenstierna family. It stayed in the Gyllenstierna family for almost 250 years, until in 1720 it passed by marriage to Count Arvid Horn. For three generations it stayed within the Horn family. During the 19th century, it belonged to the families Thott and Posse but was sold in 1852 to the Crown Prince, the future King Charles XV of Sweden. The prince, however, sold the estate in 1855, and it subsequently changed ownership many times.

== Architecture ==
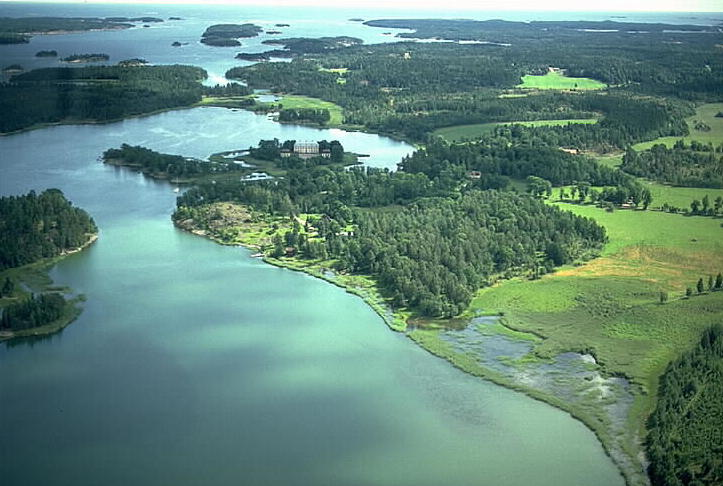
Aerial view of Fågelvik

The manor is located on a small island in an inlet of the Baltic Sea. The medieval estate included a castle surrounded by a moat located approximately 2 kilometres (1.2 mi) south of the present manor. The ruins of the castle, destroyed during the Dacke War in 1542, are still partially visible. The presently visible main building of the manor was built during the 18th century. Designs were made already during the 1730s by architect Carl Hårleman but construction did not commence until the 1770s. The designs were then probably somewhat altered by architect Jean Eric Rehn.

The main building is a two-story building with an extension protruding from the middle of the facade towards the garden. There are two wings, built at the same time as the main building, as well as several outbuildings and annexes.
