= Siege of Tönning =

Sieges during the Great Northern War

Coordinates: 54.3167°N 8.9500°E

- Part of the Great Northern War
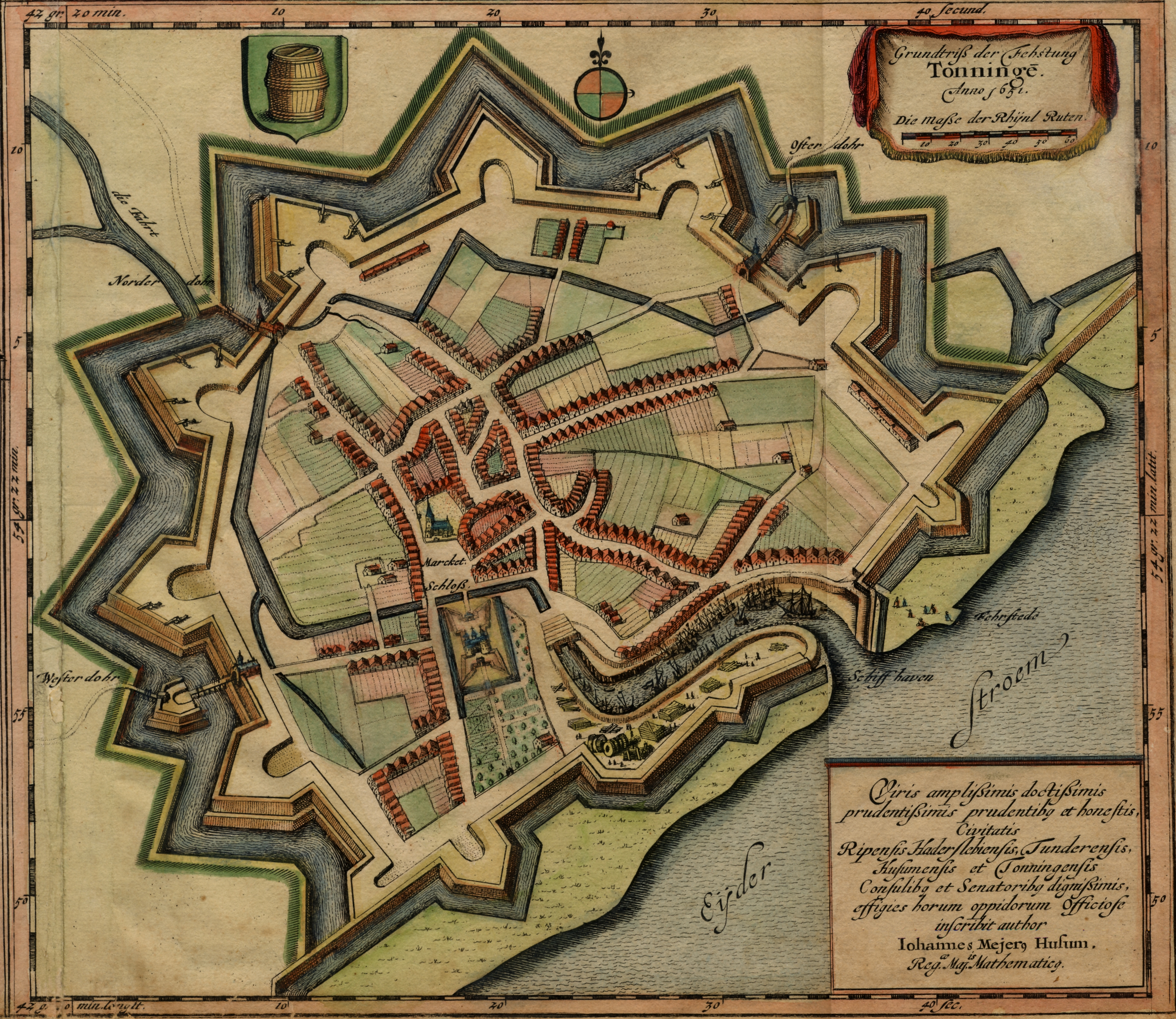
- Tönning defensive works
Date	1st: March–August 1700; 2nd: 1713–February 1714
Location	Tönning (Tønning) area, Holstein-Gottorp (present-day Germany)
Result	1700: siege lifted, Peace of Travendal; 1713–1714: Allied victory

Belligerents
(Swedish Empire) Swedish Empire; Holstein-Gottorp	Denmark–Norway (1700; 1713–1714); Saxony (1713–1714); Tsardom of Russia (1713–1714)

Commanders and leaders
Frederick IV, Duke of Holstein-Gottorp (1700) (Swedish Empire) Nils Gyllenstierna (1700) (Swedish Empire) Magnus Stenbock (1713–1714)	(Tsardom of Russia) Aleksandr Danilovich Menshikov (1713–1714)

Units involved
	Norwegian Infantry Regiment

Strength
9,000 Swedes (1713–1714); 1,600 Holsteiners (1713–1714)	36,000 (1713–1714)

During the Great Northern War, the fortress of Tönning (Danish: Tønning) in the territory of Holstein-Gottorp, an ally of the Swedish Empire, was besieged twice. Denmark–Norway was forced to lift the first siege in 1700, but a combined force of the anti-Swedish coalition successfully besieged and took Tönning in 1713–1714.

== 1700 ==
The first siege was one of the first military actions of the Great Northern War. Denmark–Norway, Saxe-Poland-Lithuania and Russia had agreed on invading the Swedish Empire on three fronts, and accordingly, Danish forces moved into Holstein-Gottorp, allied and dynastically tied to Sweden, and laid siege to Tönning in March 1700. The siege had to be lifted when Charles XII of Sweden, backed by the Maritime Powers, in a surprise move deployed an army in front of Copenhagen, forcing Frederik IV of Denmark–Norway out of the war by the Peace of Travendal on 18 August 1700. Denmark re-entered the war only in 1709 as a consequence of the Swedish defeat at Poltava.

== 1713–1714 ==
In early 1713, forces of the Swedish Empire and Holstein-Gottorp were encircled by a combined Russian and Saxe-Polish army in a pocket around Tönning. The Swedish force consisted of the remains of Magnus Stenbock's 16,000 men who had broken out of the Stralsund pocket, and ignoring orders to march into Poland turned west, defeated a Danish army the Battle of Gadebusch and pursued their remains into Holstein. The Russian and Saxe-Polish allies of Denmark sent 36,000 troops after Stenbock.

In February 1713, breaching his proclaimed neutrality, the minor duke Charles Frederick of Holstein-Gottorp provided Stenbock with shelter and auxiliaries at his fortress of Tönning in anticipation of support by the Maritime Powers, expecting a recurrence of the 1700 precedent. Yet, the Maritime Powers did not intervene, and the trapped, still 9,000 strong force of Stenbock ran out of supplies. When the food situation deteriorated and 2,800 Swedes fell ill, Stenbock surrendered on 16 May 1713.

The 1,600 strong Holstein garrison of the Tönning fortress held out until 7 February 1714. Danish forces, in pursuit of a royal occupation order of 13 March 1713, gained complete control over Holstein-Gottorp when the last Holsteiners loyal to Sweden were captured in 1715. After Tönning's surrender, its defensive works and palace were leveled until 1735.

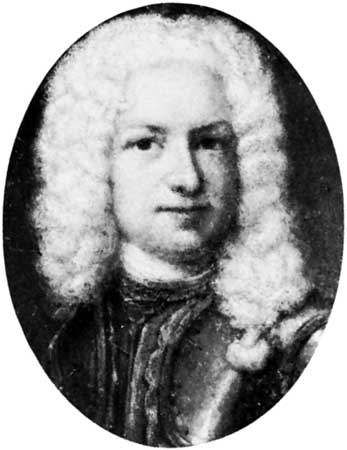
Görtz

The decision of the duke of Holstein-Gottorp to open Tönning to Stenbock as well as the brokering of the Swedish surrender is ascribed to baron Georg Heinrich von Görtz, a diplomat at Charles Frederick's court. The Swedish captives were partitioned equally among the victorious powers, despite orders Russian commander Aleksandr Danilovich Menshikov had received from tsar Peter the Great to secure the greatest share for Russia, arguing that the Russians had provided the largest contingent in the combined army. The disobedience led to rumors that Menshikov was bribed by Görtz.

== Sources ==
=== Bibliography ===
- Bushkovitch, Paul (2001). Peter the Great. The struggle for power, 1671-1725. New studies in European history. Cambridge University Press. ISBN 0-521-80585-6.
- Frost, Robert I (2000). The Northern Wars. War, State and Society in Northeastern Europe 1558-1721. Longman. ISBN 978-0-582-06429-4.
- Jakubowski-Tiessen, Manfred (1983). Der frühe Pietismus in Schleswig-holstein. Entstehung, Entwicklung und Struktur. Arbeiten zur Geschichte des Pietismus (in German). Vol. 19. Vandenhoeck & Ruprecht. ISBN 3-525-55802-3.
- Klose, Olaf (1958). Handbuch der historischen Stätten Deutschlands: Bd. Schleswig-Holstein und Hamburg, hrsg. von O. Kolse Band 1 von Handbuch der historischen Stätten Deutschlands (in German). Kröner.
- Wilson, Peter Hamish (1998). German armies. War and German politics, 1648-1806. Warfare and history. Routledge. ISBN 1-85728-106-3.
