= 1627 in Sweden =

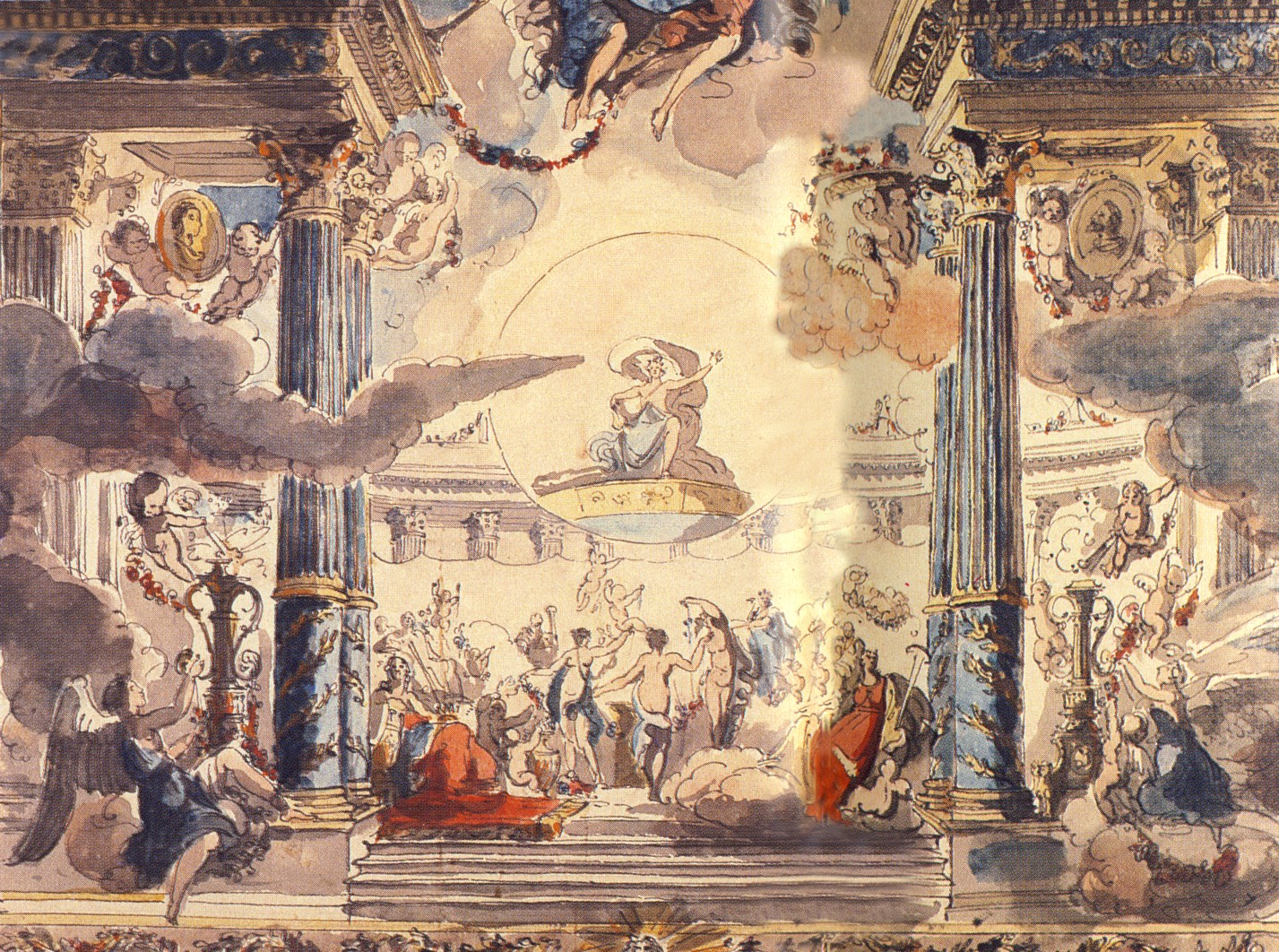
Stora Bollhuset ('The Big Ball House')

Events from the year 1627 in Sweden

== Incumbents ==
- Monarch – Gustaf II Adolf

== Events ==
- 12–17 April – Battle of Czarne
- August – Battle of Dirschau
- The Bollhuset ('The Big Ball House') is constructed in the capital of Stockholm for the royal court.
- The parish of Iisalmi is formed around Gustav Adolf Church.
- Katedralskolan ('The Cathedral School') is founded in Linköping.

== Births ==
- 7 January – Gustaf Gyllencartau, artillery captain (died 1688)
- 10 March – Catharina Wallenstedt, letter writer (died 1719)
- 27 June – Claes Anckarström, mining engineer (died 1702)
- 6 July – Jonas Österling, noble chamberlain (died 1691)
- 14 August – Abraham Leijonhufvud, baron, civil servant, and lord (died 1676)
- 27 September – Martin Brunnerus, theologian (died 1679)
- 16 October – Petrus Simonius Löfgren, priest and academic (died 1691)
- 9 November – Lars Franc, councillor and politician (died 1678)
- 27 November – Otto Reinhold Taube of Karlö, governor and colonel (died 1689)
- 22 December – Klas Örnhiälm, historian (died 1695)
- Jonas Austrelius, priest (died 1692)
- Olaus Andreae Bergius, priest (died 1692)
- Erik Breedh, lieutenant and knight (died 1707)
- Isak Enefelt, knighted assessor (died 1678)
- Maria Sofia De la Gardie, courtier, banker, and industrialist entrepreneur (died 1694)
- Elin Håkansson, healer accused of witchcraft (died 1702)
- Thomas Walgensten, inventor of the magic lantern (died 1681)

== Deaths ==
- 26 February – Nils Posse, civil servant (born 1558)
- 1 April – Lindorm Ribbing, land owner and governor (born 1569)
- 13 April – Agnes of Holstein-Gottorp, German Princess (born 1578)
- 29 May – Johannes Simonius, philosopher and academic (born 1565)
- 22 August – Bengt Åkesson Soop, chamberlain (born c. 1587)
- 7 October – Hans Hansson Dober, surgeon and politician (born 1564)
- Henrik Hybertsson, shipbuilder
- Sveno Laurentii, priest (born c. 1540)
- Haquinus Laurentii Rhezelius, priest and publisher
- Jakob Jakobsson Snakenborg, military officer and civil servant (born c. 1540)
- Torstanus Sunonis Spinke, vicar
- Thure Spahandelin, chief equerry to Gustavus Adolphus (born c. 1550)
- Wollmar Yxkull, court marshal (born c. 1579)
