= 1719 in Sweden =

- Years in Sweden: 1716 1717 1718 1719 1720 1721 1722
- Centuries: 17th century · 18th century · 19th century
- Decades: 1680s 1690s 1700s 1710s 1720s 1730s 1740s
- Years: 1716 1717 1718 1719 1720 1721 1722

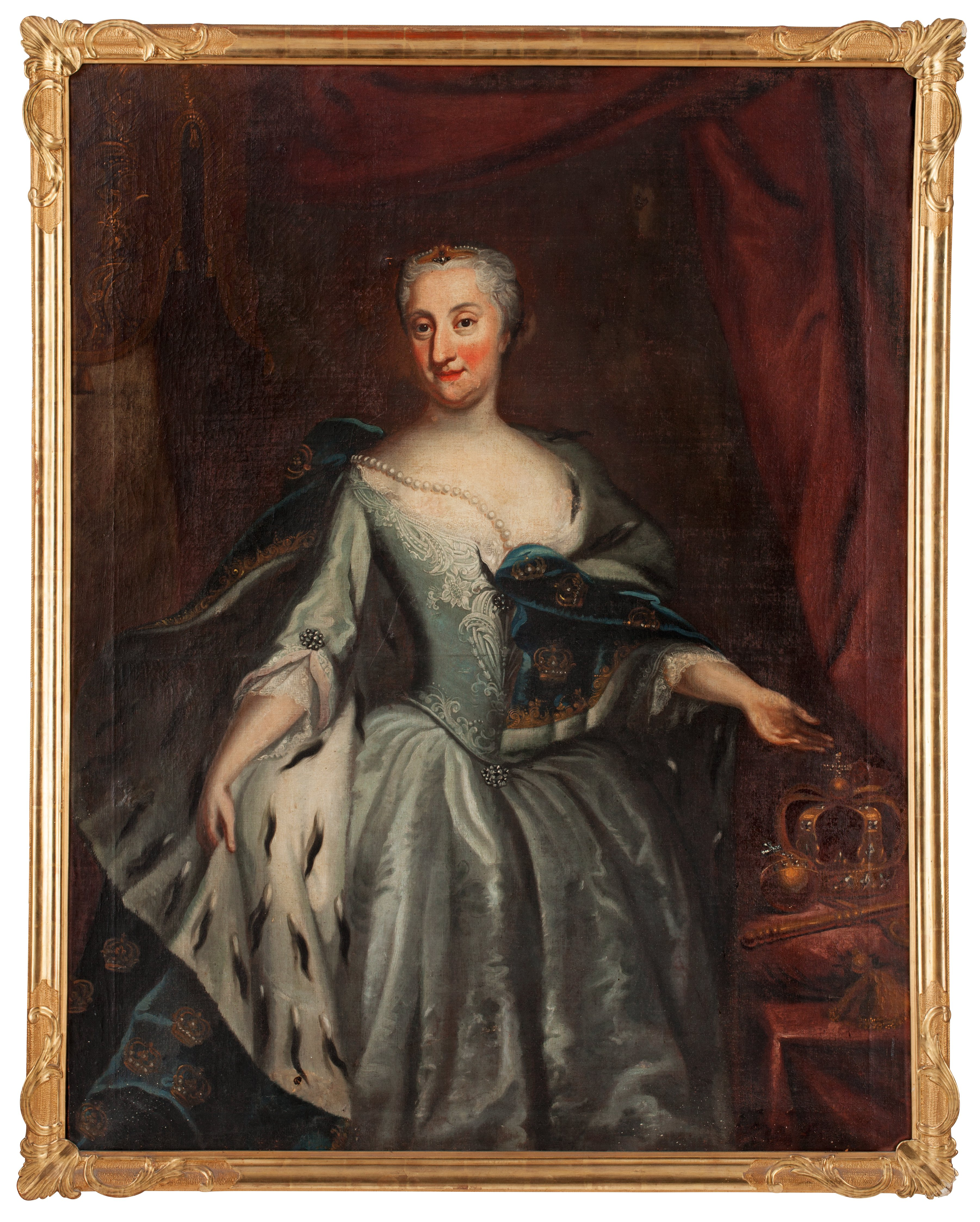
Georg Engelhard Schröder - Ulrika Eleonora Queen of Sweden

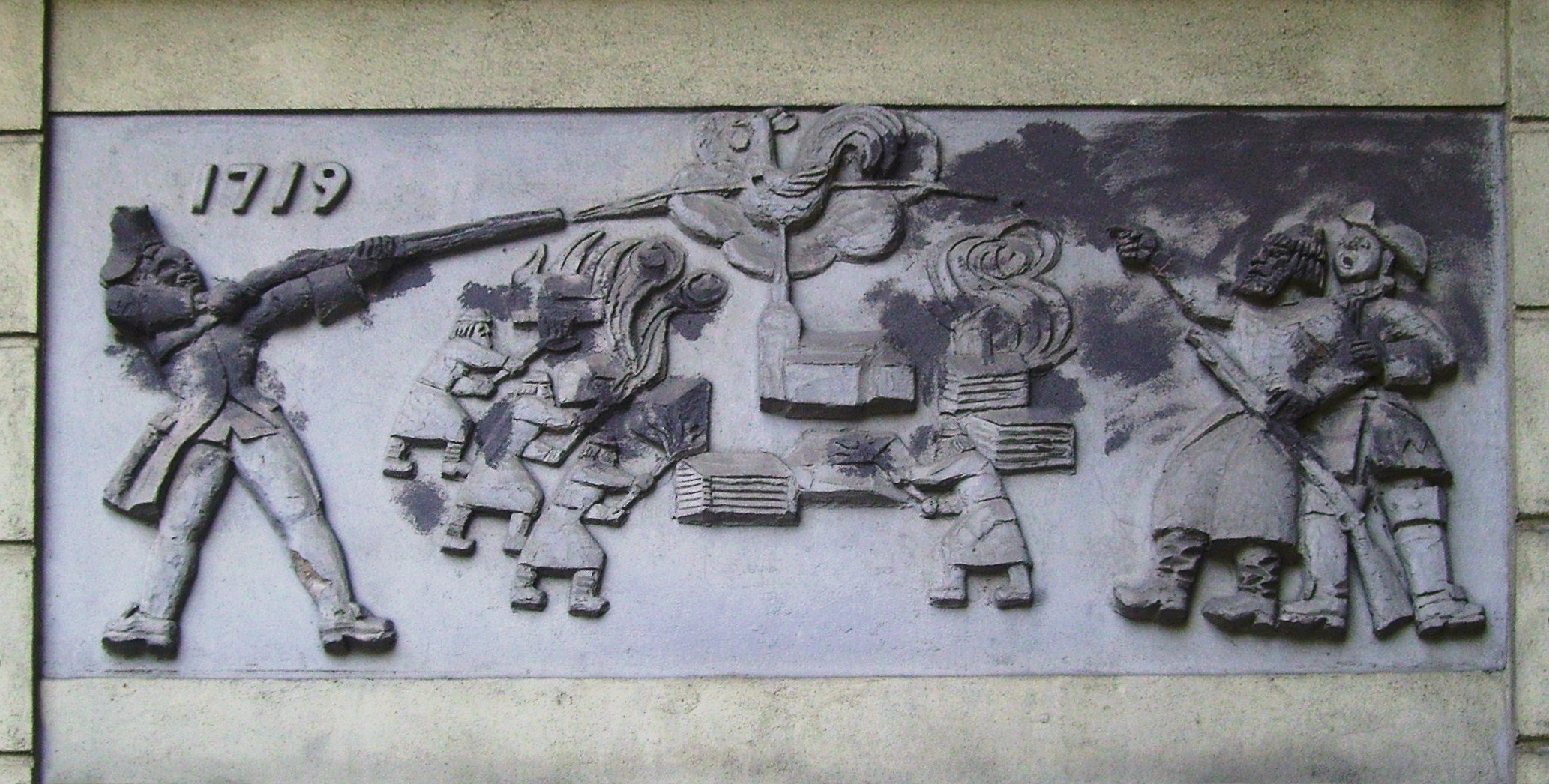
Relief depicting the Russian atrocities during the Russian Pillage of 1719-1721, on the façade of a hotel in Södertälje.

Events from the year 1719 in Sweden

== Incumbents ==
- Monarch – Ulrika Eleonora

== Events ==
- * January - The Carolean Death March.
- 23 January - The Riksdag of the Estates refuse the recognize Queen Ulrika Eleonora as monarch by inheritance, but agree to recognize her as monarch by election after she agrees to ratify a new constitution, Instrument of Government (1719), introducing a parliamentary system and a constitutional monarchy.
- 27 January - The remains of Charles XII arrive to Karlberg Palace outside the capital.
- 19 February - Queen Ulrika Eleonora signs the new constitution.
- 19 February - The execution of Georg Heinrich von Görtz.
- 21 February - The new constitution is applied and the absolute monarchy is thereby abolished.
- 26 February - The burial of Charles XII.
- 17 March - The coronation of Queen Ulrika Eleonora.
- 10 April - Arvid Horn steps down as Privy Council Chancellery.
- 15 May - Gustav Cronhielm appointed Privy Council Chancellery.
- July to August - The Russian Pillage of 1719-1721.
- 24 July - Nyköping is burned during the Russian Pillage of 1719–1721.
- 13 August - The Russian unsuccessfully attacks Stockholm in the Battle of Stäket during the Russian Pillage of 1719–1721.
- 19 August - Norrtälje is burned during the Russian Pillage of 1719-1721
- 9 November – Peace between Sweden and Hannover.
- 9 December - Arvid Horn replace Gustav Cronhielm as Privy Council Chancellery.
- - Formation of the Caps (party) and Hats (party).
- - The Södermalm riots, one of the biggest riots in Stockholm history, originating from a fight in a brothel, spread in the poorer areas of Stockholm where it lasts for several days, resulting in a great deal of damage.
- - Boërosia by Nils Hufwedsson Dal

== Births ==
- 5 April - Axel von Fersen the Elder, politician (died 1794)
- - Petter Stenborg, actor and theater director (died 1781)
- - Charlotta Sparre, courtier (died 1795)
- - Christina Nyman, brewer (died 1795)

== Deaths ==
- February 19 - Georg Heinrich von Görtz, diplomat and royal favorite (born 1688)
- - Catharina Wallenstedt, letter writer (born 1627)
