= 1644 in Sweden =

- Years in Sweden: 1641 1642 1643 1644 1645 1646 1647
- Centuries: 16th century · 17th century · 18th century
- Decades: 1610s 1620s 1630s 1640s 1650s 1660s 1670s
- Years: 1641 1642 1643 1644 1645 1646 1647

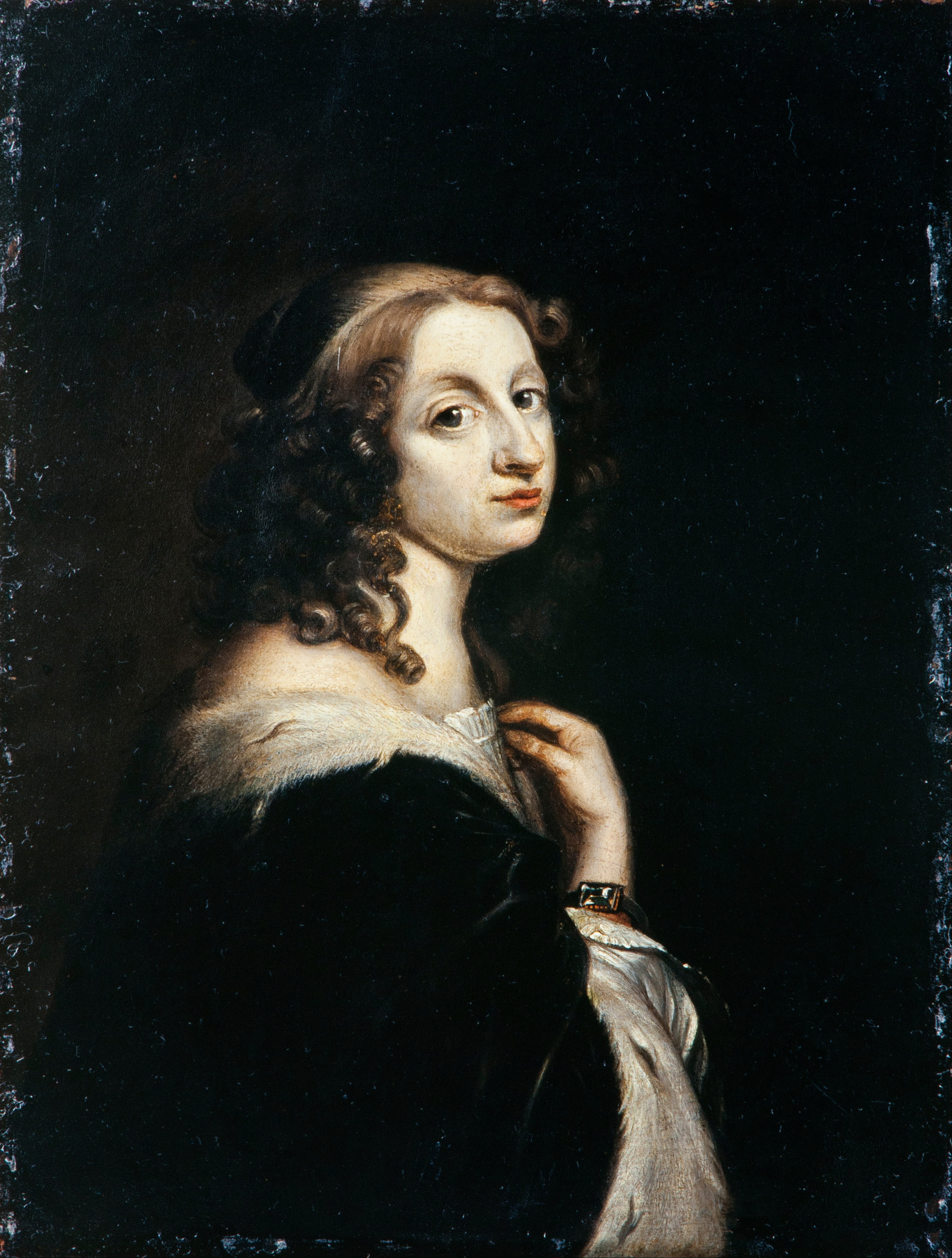
David Beck - Christina, Queen of Sweden c. 1644–1654 - Google Art Project

Events from the year 1644 in Sweden

== Incumbents ==
- Monarch – Christina

== Events ==
- 9 January - Battle of Kolding (1644)
- Swedish occupation of Jylland.
- Swedish occupation of Landskrona and Helsingborg in Danish Scania.
- 16 May - Action of 16 May 1644
- 1 July - Battle of Colberger Heide
- 13 October - Battle of Fehmarn (1644)
- 23 November - Battle of Jüterbog
- Queen Christina is declared to be of legal majority and the regency government is dissolved.
- December 4 - Battle of Bysjön
- A new sumptuary law bans the use of textiles, laces and ribbons of gold and silver for clothing, as well as engagement- and baptism parties: the law is not respected and is replaced in 1664.

== Births ==
- 7 February - Nils Bielke, member of the High Council of Sweden, military and politician (died 1716)
- Märet Jonsdotter, alleged witch (died 1672)
- Beata Magdalena Wittenberg, courtier (died 1705)

== Deaths ==
- 26 July - Clas Fleming (admiral), admiral and administrator involved in the development of a formal management structure for the Royal Swedish Navy under King Gustav II Adolf and Queen Christina (born 1592)
- 21 April - Torsten Stålhandske, Finnish officer in the Swedish army during the Thirty Years' War (born 1593)
