= 1696 in Sweden =

- Decades: 1670s; 1680s; 1690s; 1700s; 1710s
- See also: Other events of 1696; Timeline of Swedish history

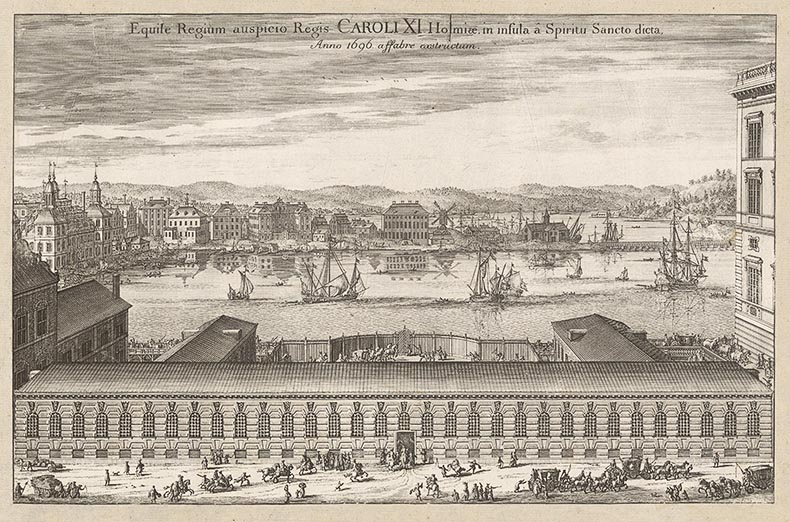
Kungliga stallet

Events from the year 1696 in Sweden

== Incumbents ==
- Monarch – Charles XI

== Events ==
- The Velthen Company perform in Stockholm.
- A repeated failed harvest results in the culmination and continuation of the Great Famine.
- Kalmar Nation at Lund University is first mentioned.
- Andreas Rudman and Erik Björck set sail in August of 1696 for America, with the intention of becoming ministers to congregations within the former colony of New Sweden and they arrived in early 1897. They brought with them translated copies of numerous religious texts.

== Births ==
- - Henrietta Polyxena of Vasaborg, princess (died 1777)
- 6 June – Peter Spaak, Swedish Protestant reformer (d. 1769)
- 22 July – Eric Julius Biörner, Swedish scholar and historian (d. 1750)

== Deaths ==
- March - Jean de la Vallée, architect (born 1620)
- June - Greta Duréel, accomplice in the Great Jewel Fraud of the Swedish National Bank (birth year unknown)
- 15 April – Johan Makeléer, 2nd Baronet, Swedish justice and member of the Gothenburg Court of Justice (b. 1636)
