= 1795 in Sweden =

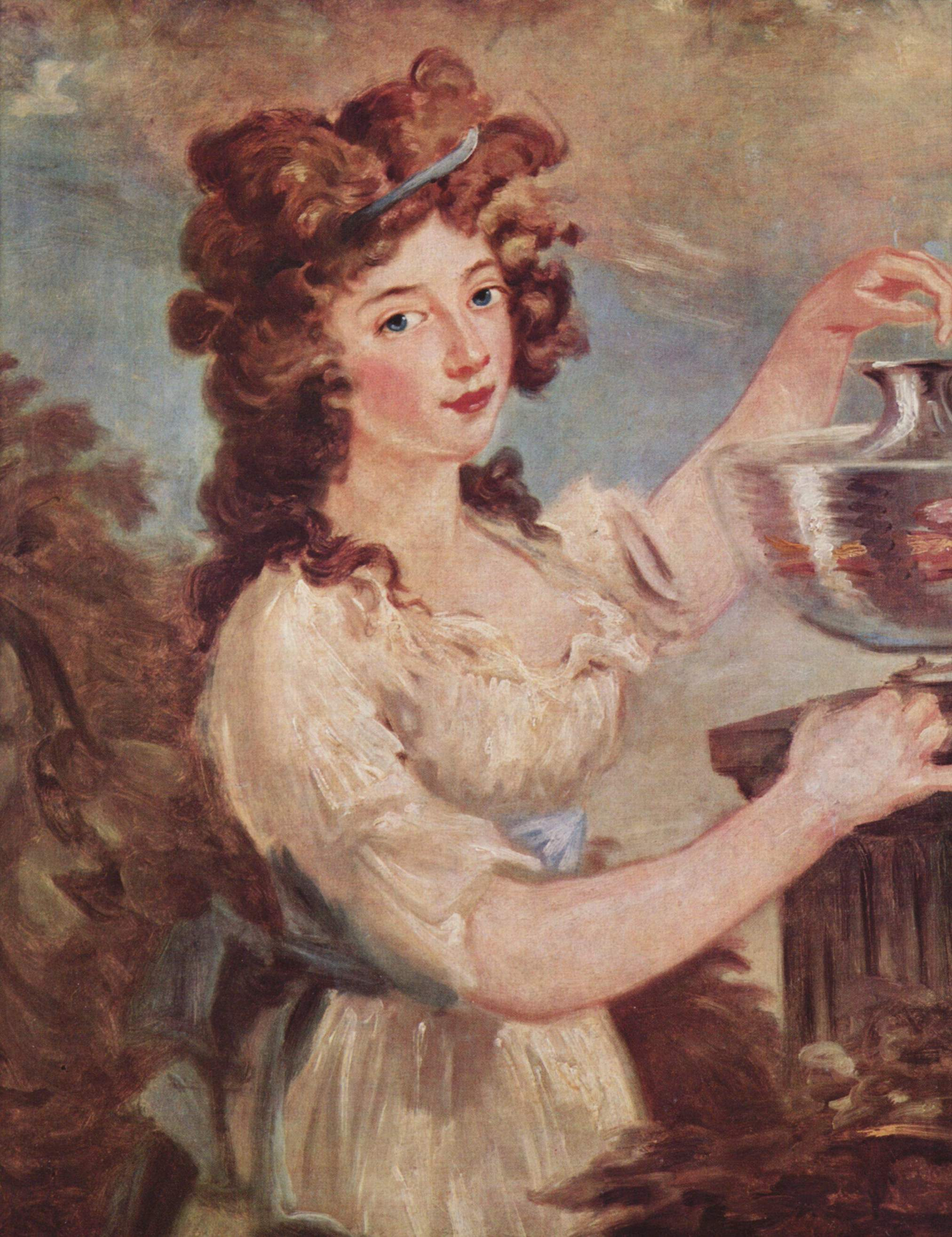
Carl Fredric von Breda 001

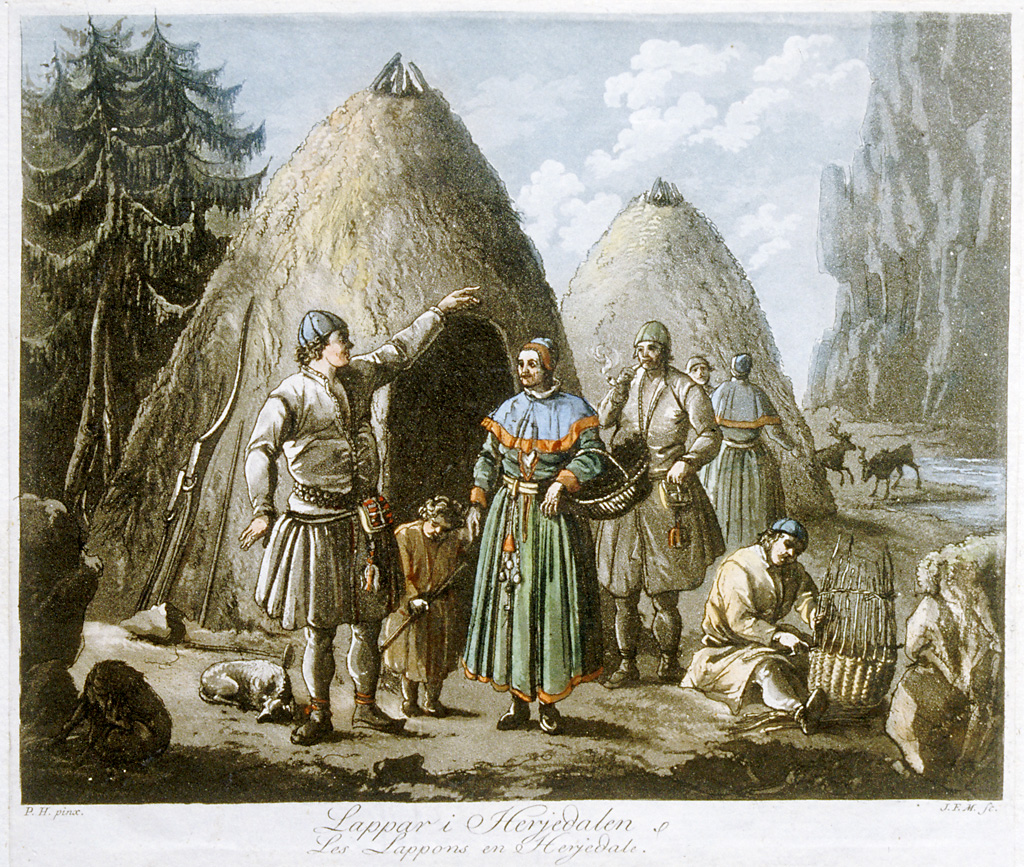
Sami people in Härjedalen, Sweden

Events from the year 1795 in Sweden

== Incumbents ==
- Monarch – Gustav IV Adolf

== Events ==
- - The Lolotte Forssberg affair.

== Births ==
- 11 September – Henrik Reuterdahl, clergyman (died 1870)
- 11 June - Sara Torsslow, actress

== Deaths ==
- 11 February – Carl Michael Bellman, poet (born 1740)
- 12 February – Michelle Elisabeth d'Ivry, courtier and spy (born 1731)
- 20 April – Johan Henric Kellgren, poet and critic (born 1751)
- 30 August - Elis Schröderheim, politician (born 1757)
- October - Christina Nyman, brewer (born 1719)
- 6 December - Sofia Liljegren, opera singer (born 1765)
- 20 December - Charlotta Sparre, courtier (born 1719)
- Helena Malheim, midwife (born 1716)
