= 1678 in Sweden =

- Decades: 1650s; 1660s; 1670s; 1680s; 1690s
- See also: Other events of 1678; Timeline of Swedish history

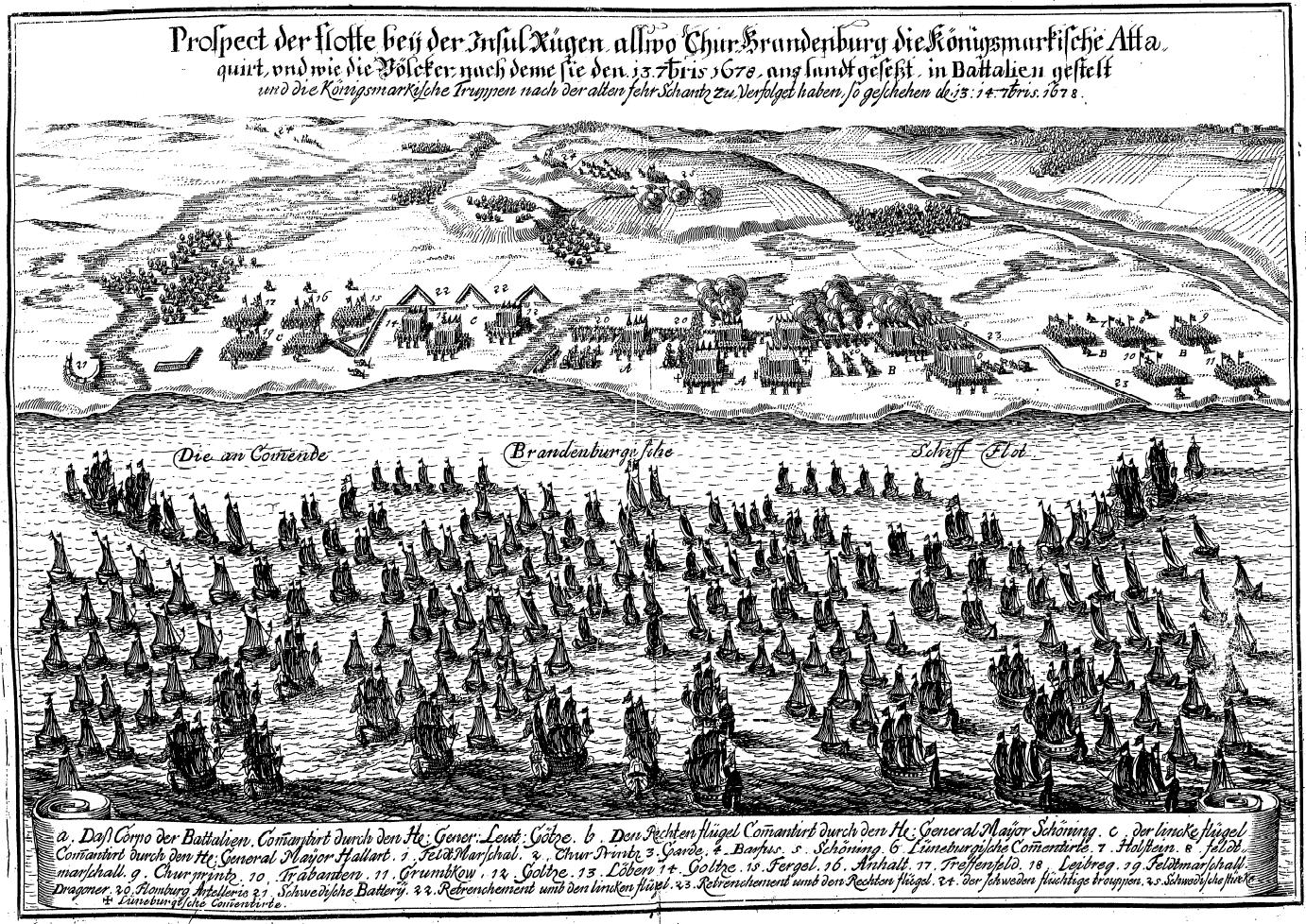
Renewed invasion by the allies on 23 September 1678, 8 months after the battle

Events from the year 1678 in Sweden

== Incumbents ==
- Monarch – Charles XI

== Events ==
- 18 January - Battle of Warksow
- Siege of Bohus Fortress.
- Medevi is founded.
- Swedish Pomerania is occupied by Brandenburg.

== Notable births ==
- Maria Faxell, war heroine (died 1738)
- Hans Hysing, swedish born portrait-painter in England (died 1752 or 1753)

== Notable deaths ==
- Jörgen Krabbe, Swedish nobleman and politician (b. 1633)
