= 1699 in Sweden =

- Years in Sweden: 1696 1697 1698 1699 1700 1701 1702
- Centuries: 16th century · 17th century · 18th century
- Decades: 1660s 1670s 1680s 1690s 1700s 1710s 1720s
- Years: 1696 1697 1698 1699 1700 1701 1702

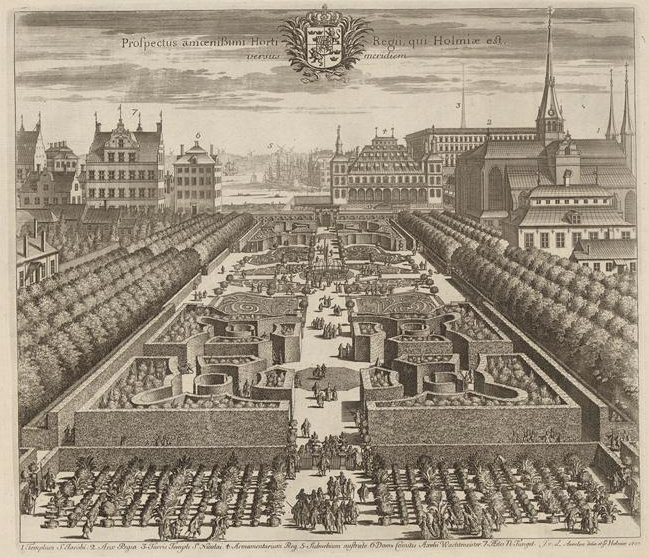

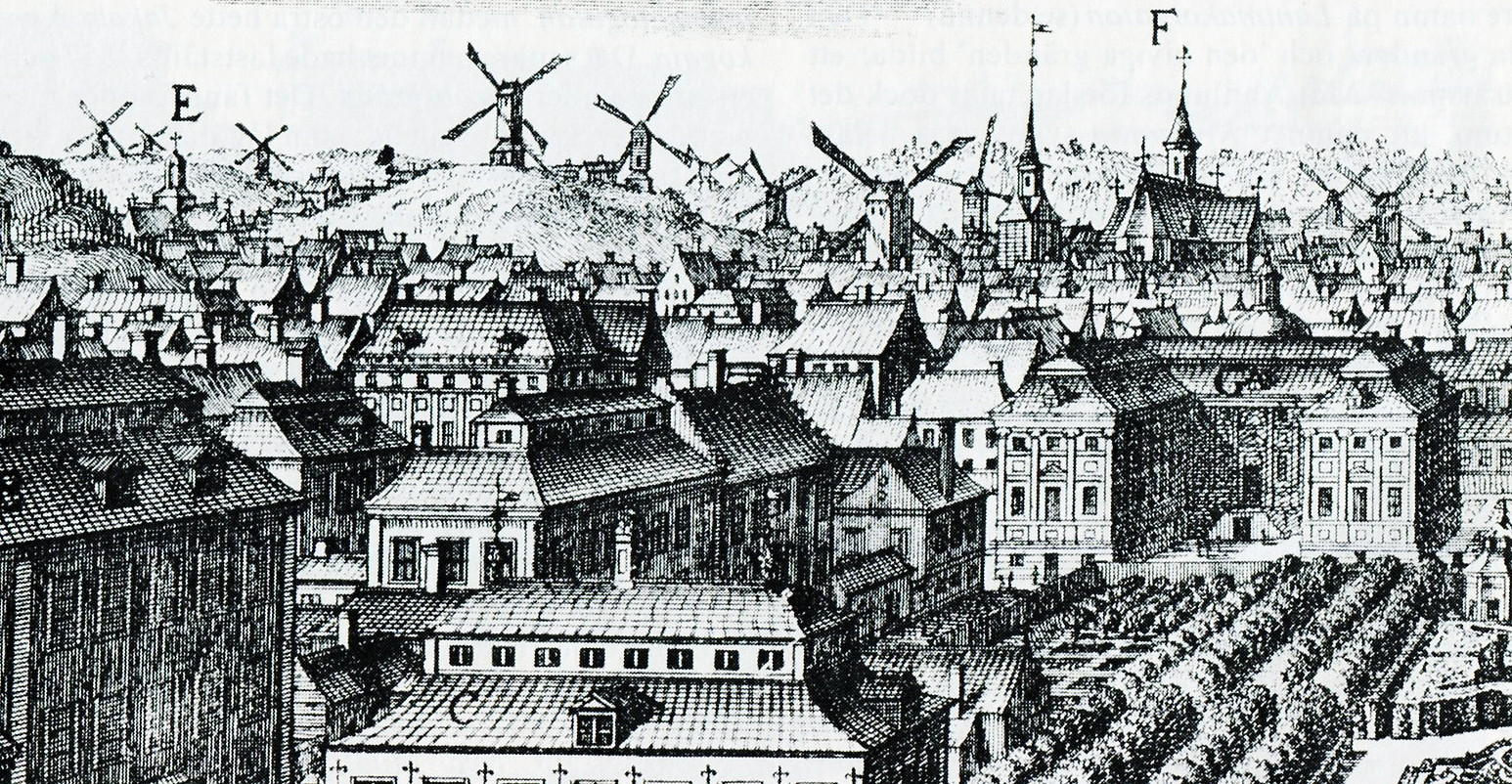

Events from the year 1699 in Sweden

== Incumbents ==
- Monarch – Charles XII

== Events ==
- - The king has a relapse in the Gottorp Fury upon the visit of his brother-in-law.
- August - A French theater company, La troupe du Roi de Suede is engaged to perform drama, opera and ballet at the Swedish royal court.

== Births ==
- unknown - Afrosinya, serf mistress of Alexei Petrovich, Tsarevich of Russia (died 1748)

== Deaths ==
- 24 July - Axel Wachtmeister, Count of Mälsåker, field marshal (born 1643)
- Maria Eriksdotter, bank robber.
