= 1645 in Sweden =

- Years in Sweden: 1642 1643 1644 1645 1646 1647 1648
- Centuries: 16th century · 17th century · 18th century
- Decades: 1610s 1620s 1630s 1640s 1650s 1660s 1670s
- Years: 1642 1643 1644 1645 1646 1647 1648

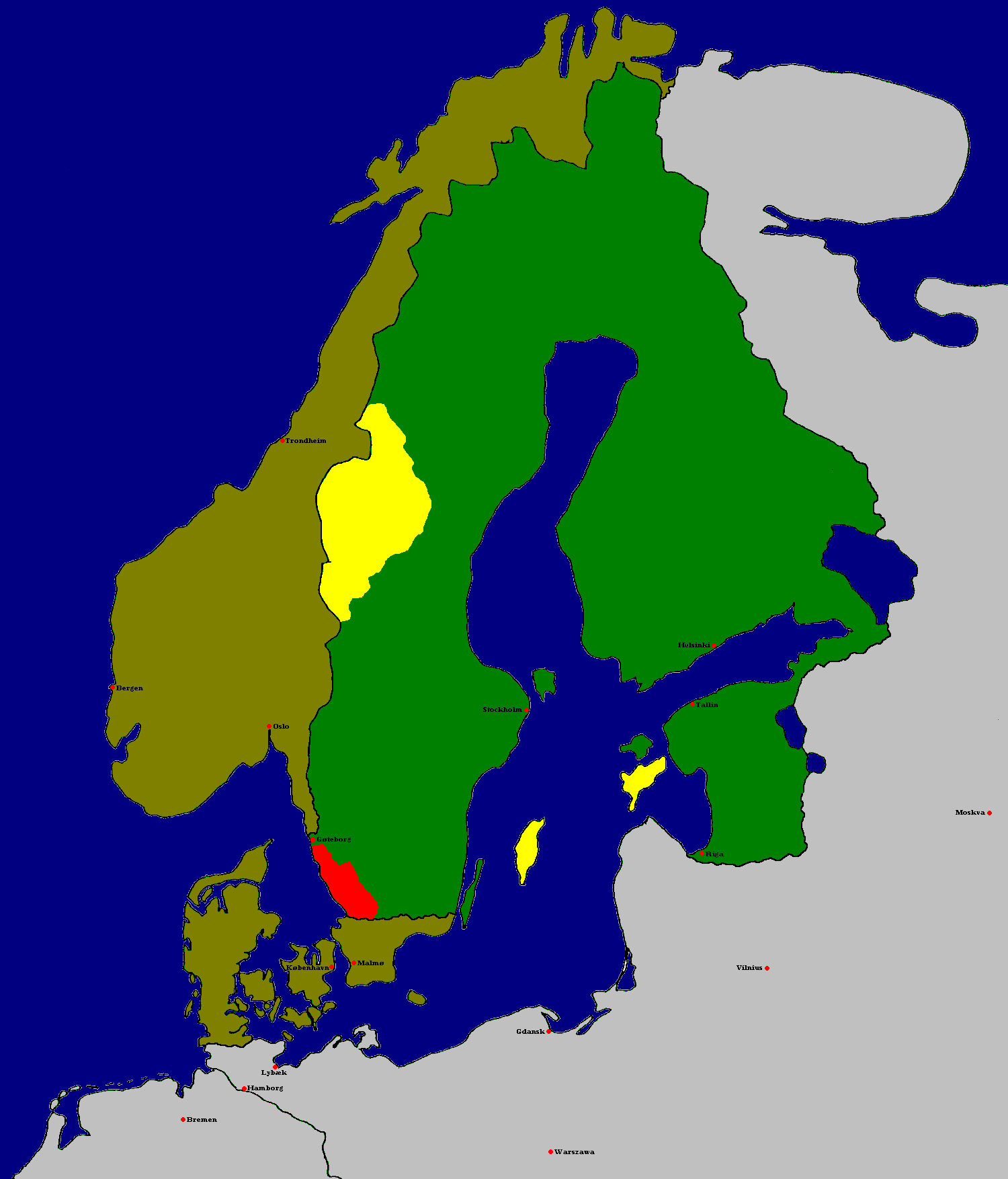
The Treaty of Brömsebro in 1645. Brown: Denmark-Norway; Green: Sweden; Yellow: the provinces of Jämtland, Härjedalen, Idre & Särna and the Baltic Sea islands of Gotland and Ösel, which were ceded to Sweden; Red: the province of Halland, ceded for 30 years

Events from the year 1645 in Sweden

== Incumbents ==
- Monarch – Christina

== Events ==
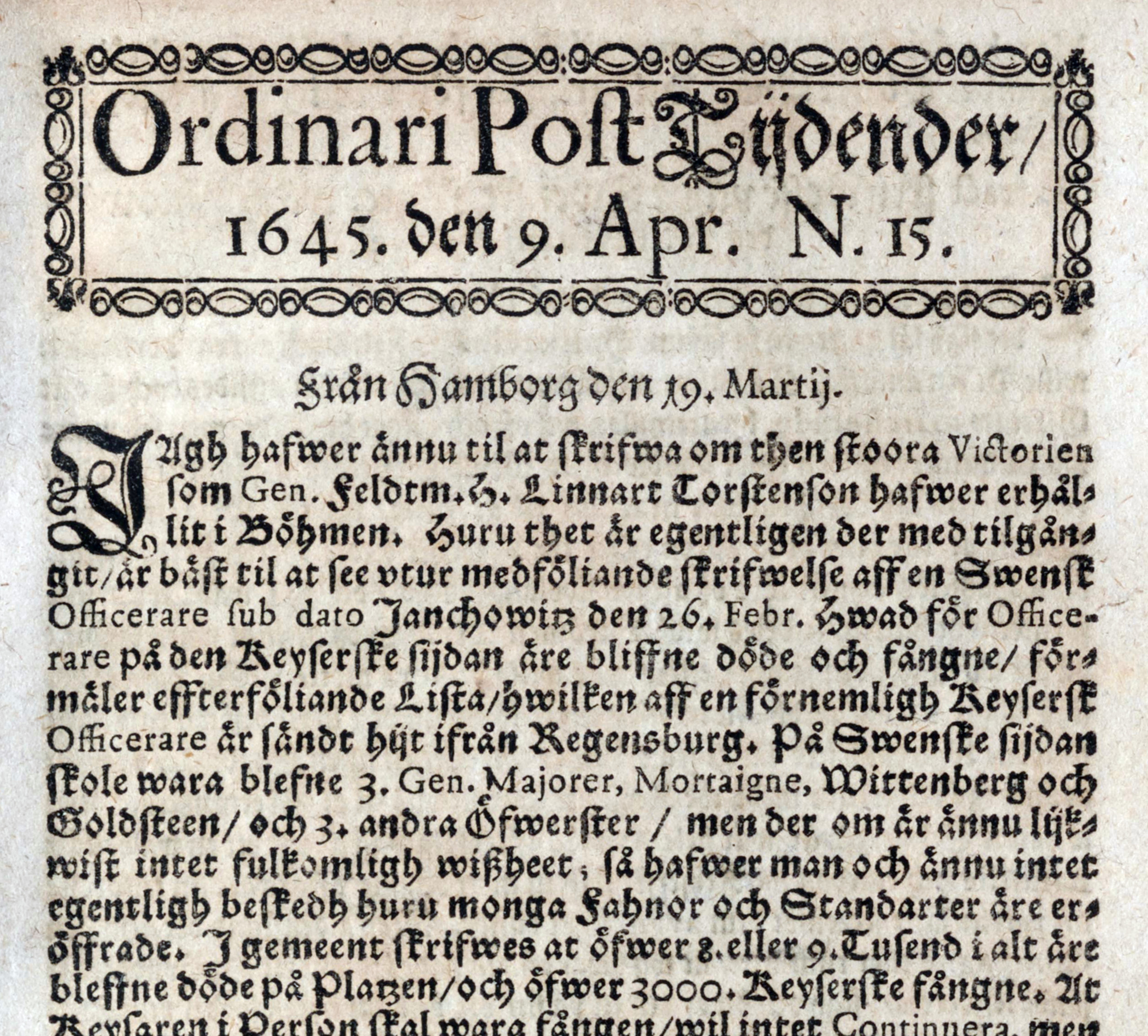
Post- och Inrikes Tidningar no. 15, 9 April 1645.

- First issue of Post- och Inrikes Tidningar.
- Sweden occupies Verden.
- 5 March - Battle of Jankau: The armies of Sweden decisively defeat the forces of the Holy Roman Empire, in one of the bloodiest battles of the war, in southern Bohemia, some 50 kilometres (31 mi) southeast of Prague].
- Smålands nation, Uppsala is founded.
- 13 August - The Treaty of Brömsebro is signed between Sweden and Denmark–Norway, ending the Torstenson War and ceding Jemtland, Herjedalen, Gotland and Ösel (Saaremaa) to Sweden, which also holds the province of Halland for a period of 30 years, as a guarantee.
- Lennart Torstenson resigns as the leader of the Swedish army.

== Births ==
- Haquin Spegel, religious author and hymn writer who held several bishop's seats (died 1714)

== Deaths ==
- 15 March - Johan Skytte, politician (born 1577)
- Gese Wechel, first female director of the Swedish Post Office (born unknown)
