= 1639 in Sweden =

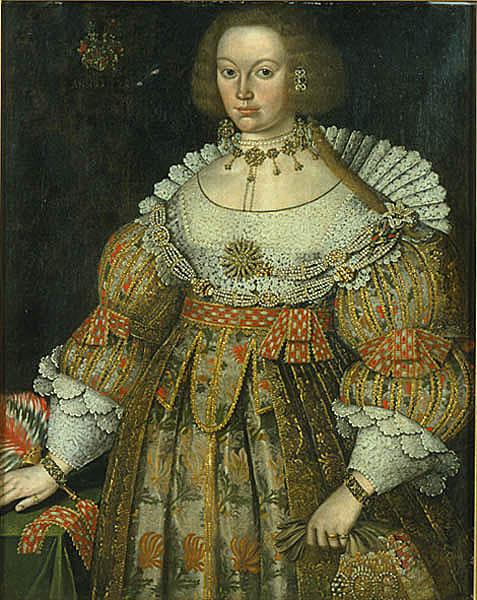
Beata von Yxkull

Events from the year 1639 in Sweden

== Incumbents ==
- Monarch – Christina, Queen of Sweden (under regency). Although Queen Christina was still a minor, her regency council (led by figures such as Axel Oxenstierna, Lord High Chancellor of Sweden) carried out Swedish ambitions both abroad and domestically.

== Events ==
- 14 April – Battle of Chemnitz took place near the town of Chemnitz, in what is now eastern Germany, during the Thirty Years' War. Swedish forces under Johan Banér inflicted a crushing defeat on Rodolfo Giovanni Marazzino who commanded the Saxons and an Imperial detachment.
- Hjälmare Canal (Swedish: Hjälmare kanal) officially taken into use. The Hjälmare Canal, Sweden's oldest canal, became operational. The canal connected Lake Hjälmaren to Lake Mälaren and was a major infrastructure project intended to transport iron abroad and bypass dangerous stretches of water.
- Case of Anna von Hintzen, a noble who flees Sweden to escape arrest of the murder of her servant.

== Births ==
- 5 January – Otto Wilhelm Königsmarck, military officer (d. 1688)
- 21 January – Märta Berendes, courtier and diary writer (d. 1717)

== Deaths ==
- 17 December – Nils Turesson Bielke, statesman and military officer (b. 1569)

== Internal Affairs ==
1639 marked continued efforts within Sweden to strengthen administrative control and legal reforms. Queen Christina's regency council promoted the centralization of power to maintain stability and foster Sweden's growing influence. This period saw an emphasis on consolidating territories gained through the war and reinforcing governance structures at home.
