= Malheim =

Malheim is a surname. Notable people with the surname include:

- Friedrich Ritter von Friedländer-Malheim (1825–1901), Bohemian-Austrian painter
- Helena Malheim (1716–1795), Swedish midwife
