= 1647 in Sweden =

- Years in Sweden: 1644 1645 1646 1647 1648 1649 1650
- Centuries: 16th century · 17th century · 18th century
- Decades: 1610s 1620s 1630s 1640s 1650s 1660s 1670s
- Years: 1644 1645 1646 1647 1648 1649 1650

1647 in Sweden. Christina was the Queen of Sweden as the Thirty Years' War was coming to a close with the Peace of Westphalia being signed the following year. During this year Sweden's American colony of New Sweden continued its struggles with the neighbouring Dutch colony of New Netherland threatening the Swedish fur trade.

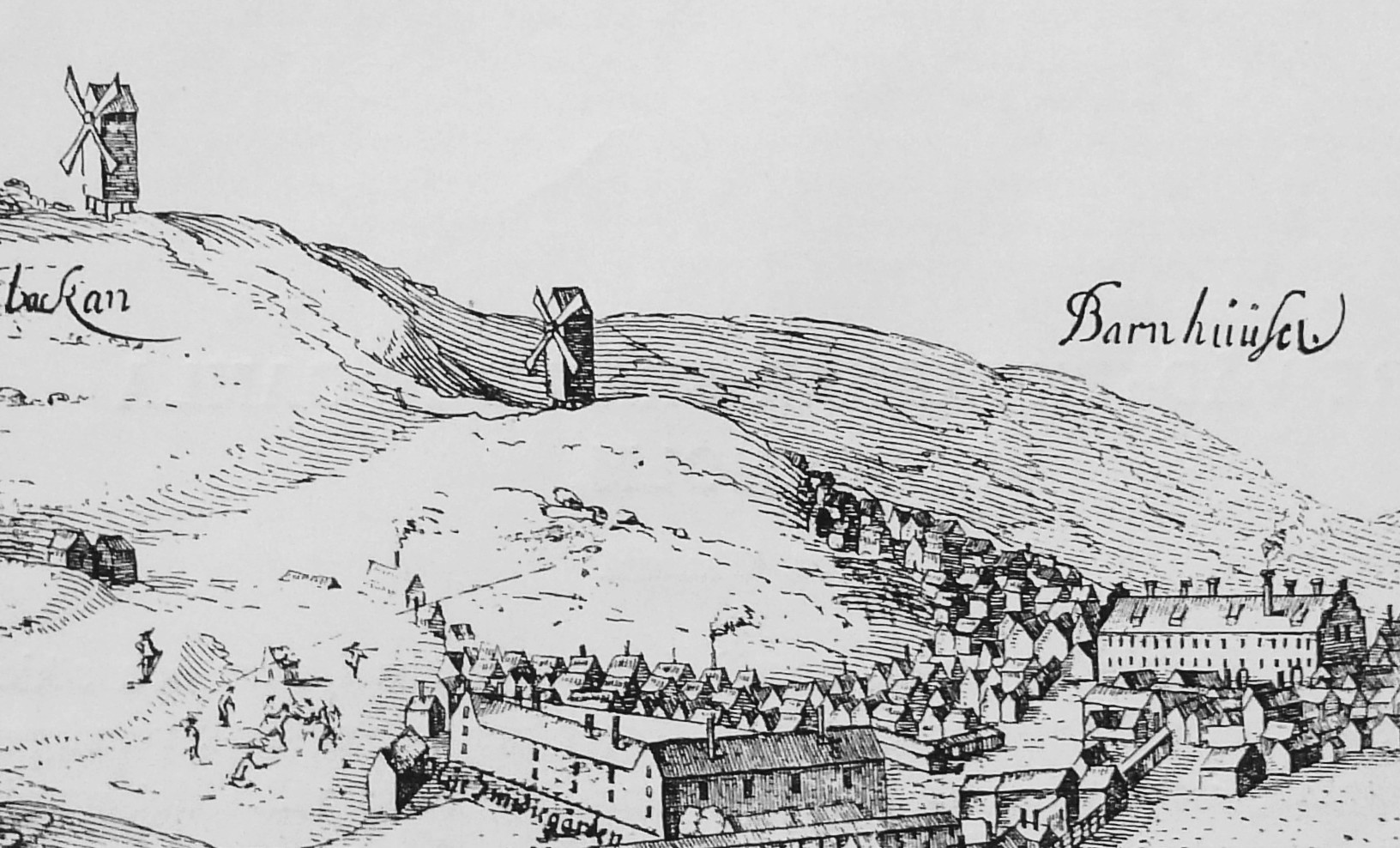

== Incumbents ==
- Monarch - Christina

== Events ==
- March 14 – Sweden, France, and Bavaria sign the Truce of Ulm (which was eventually broken by Bavaria to assist Austria against Sweden and France) ending the Bavarian Campaign.
- March 25 – In an incident that attracted attention, an orphan, Elisabett Månsdåtter, leads sixteen orphans from the Allmänna Barnhuset up to the royal palace, where she successfully demands to be given an audience with queen Christina and states in a complaint, that the children in the orphanage had been forced to beg on the streets to be given anything to eat.
- August 22 - During the Battle of Triebl, Imperial forces defeat the Swedes in a surprise attack in Bohemia.

== Births ==
- April 18 - Elias Brenner, painter, numismatist, and archeologist (d. 1717).
- July 29 - Count Carl Piper, politician, served as Charles XII's minister in the Great Northern War (d. 1716).
- August 28 - Erik Carlsson Sjöblad, Swedish governor, admiral, and baron (d. 1725).
- December 11 - Jacob Johan Hastfer, Swedish officer, governor of Livonia (d. 1695)
