= 1694 in Sweden =

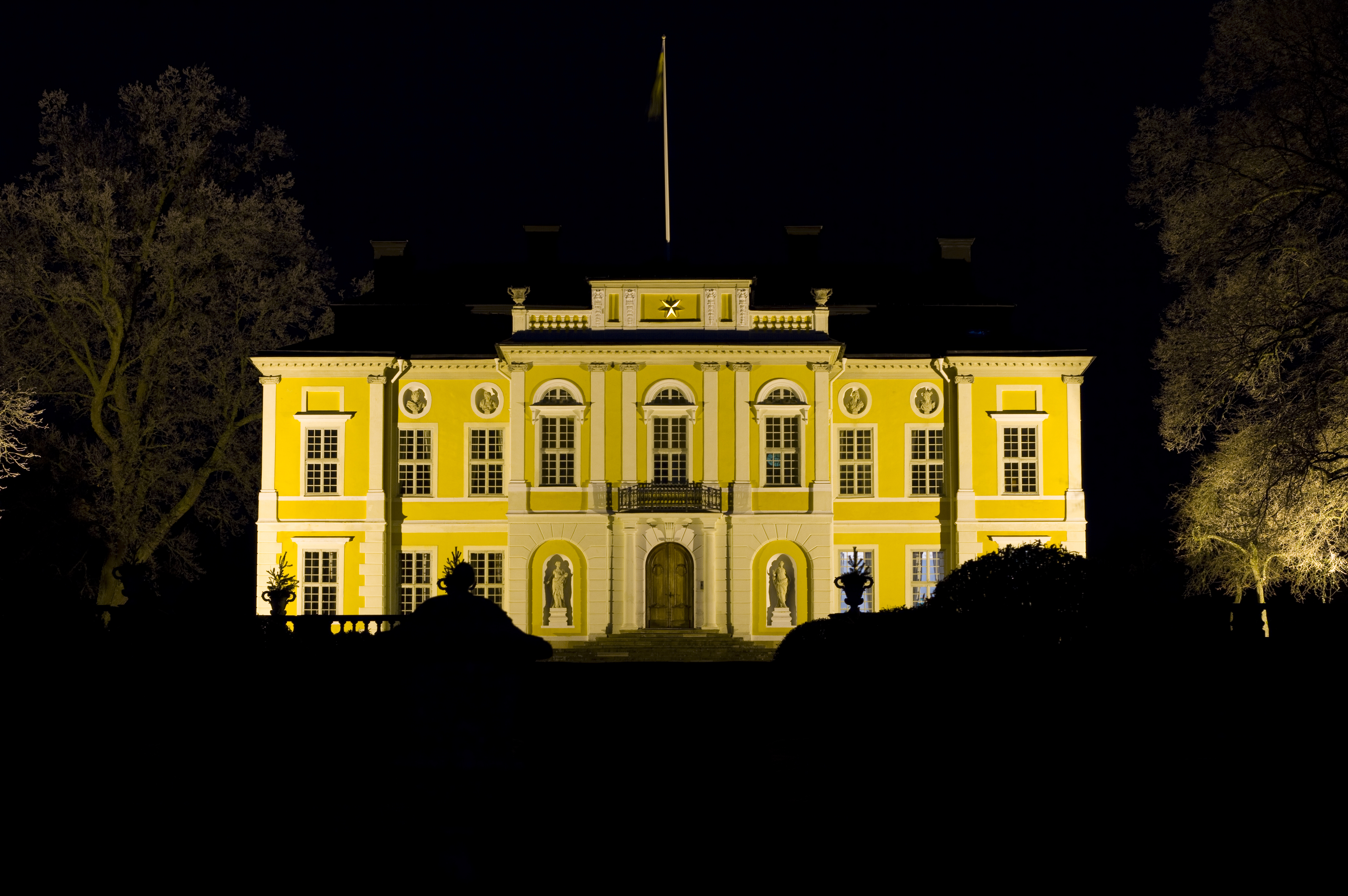
Steninge Palace at Night.

Events from the year 1694 in Sweden

== Incumbents ==
- Monarch – Charles XI

== Events ==
- - Building of the Steninge Palace
- The Great Jewel Fraud against the Swedish National Bank is exposed, in which five women, around their leader Greta Duréel, are discovered to have stolen money for years through a deposition fraud.

== Births ==
- 28 October - Johan Helmich Roman, composer (died 1758)
- - Brigitta Sahlgren, industrialist (died 1771)

== Deaths ==
- 22 August - Maria Sofia De la Gardie, industrialist (born 1627)
- July - Philip Christoph von Königsmarck, soldier and lover of Sophia Dorothea of Celle (born 1665)
