= 1591 in Sweden =

Events from the year 1591 in Sweden

== Incumbents ==
- Monarch – John III (Monarch: Sigismund III Vasa reigns as King of Sweden.)

== Births ==
- - Beata Oxenstierna, courtier (died 1652)
- - Bengt Oxenstierna (governor), diplomat (died 1643)

== Deaths ==
- January 1 - Andreas Laurentii Björnram, Archbishop of Uppsala (born 1520)
