= 1652 in Sweden =

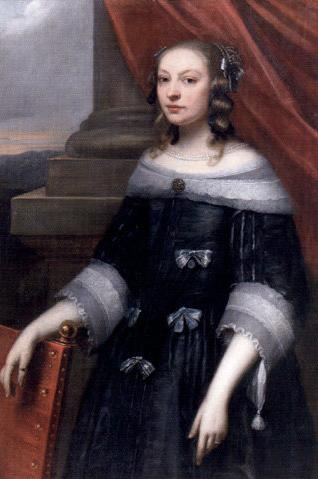
Elsa Beata Brahe c 1652 by David Beck

Events from the year 1652 in Sweden

== Incumbents ==
- Monarch – Christina

== Events ==
- Pierre Bourdelot arrives in Sweden
- Magnus Gabriel De la Gardie becomes Lord High Treasurer
- Great Oulu Fire of 1652

== Deaths ==
- 16 March - Beata Oxenstierna, courtier (born 1591)
- 19 June - Louis De Geer (1587–1652), merchant and industrialist (born 1587)
- 22 August - Jacob De la Gardie, soldier and politician (born 1583)
