= 1635 in Sweden =

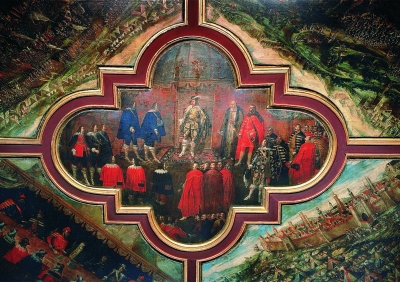
Treaty of Stuhmsdorf, wall painting from Kielce castle. Visible: bishop and chancellor Jakub Zadzik, Polish king Władysław IV and Hetman Stanisław Koniecpolski.

Events from the year 1635 in Sweden

== Incumbents ==
- Monarch – Christina

== Events ==
- The ambassadorial mission of Axel Oxenstierna to Paris: alliance between Sweden and France.
- September 12 – The Treaty of Sztumska Wieś is signed between Sweden and the Polish–Lithuanian Commonwealth.
- Truce of Altmark
- Johan Banér becomes the leader of the Swedish army.

== Births ==
- February 18 – Johan Göransson Gyllenstierna, politician (died 1680)
