= 1602 in Sweden =

Events from the year 1602 in Sweden.

== Events ==
- June 30, 1602 - Battle of Reval during the Polish–Swedish War (1600–1611) near present-day Tallinn in Estonia.

== Births ==
- 18 February - Per Brahe the Younger, Privy Councillor (born 1680)

== Deaths ==
- - Valpuri Innamaa, merchant and shipowner
