= Margareta Nilsdotter =

Swedish businessperson and shipbuilder (died 1630)

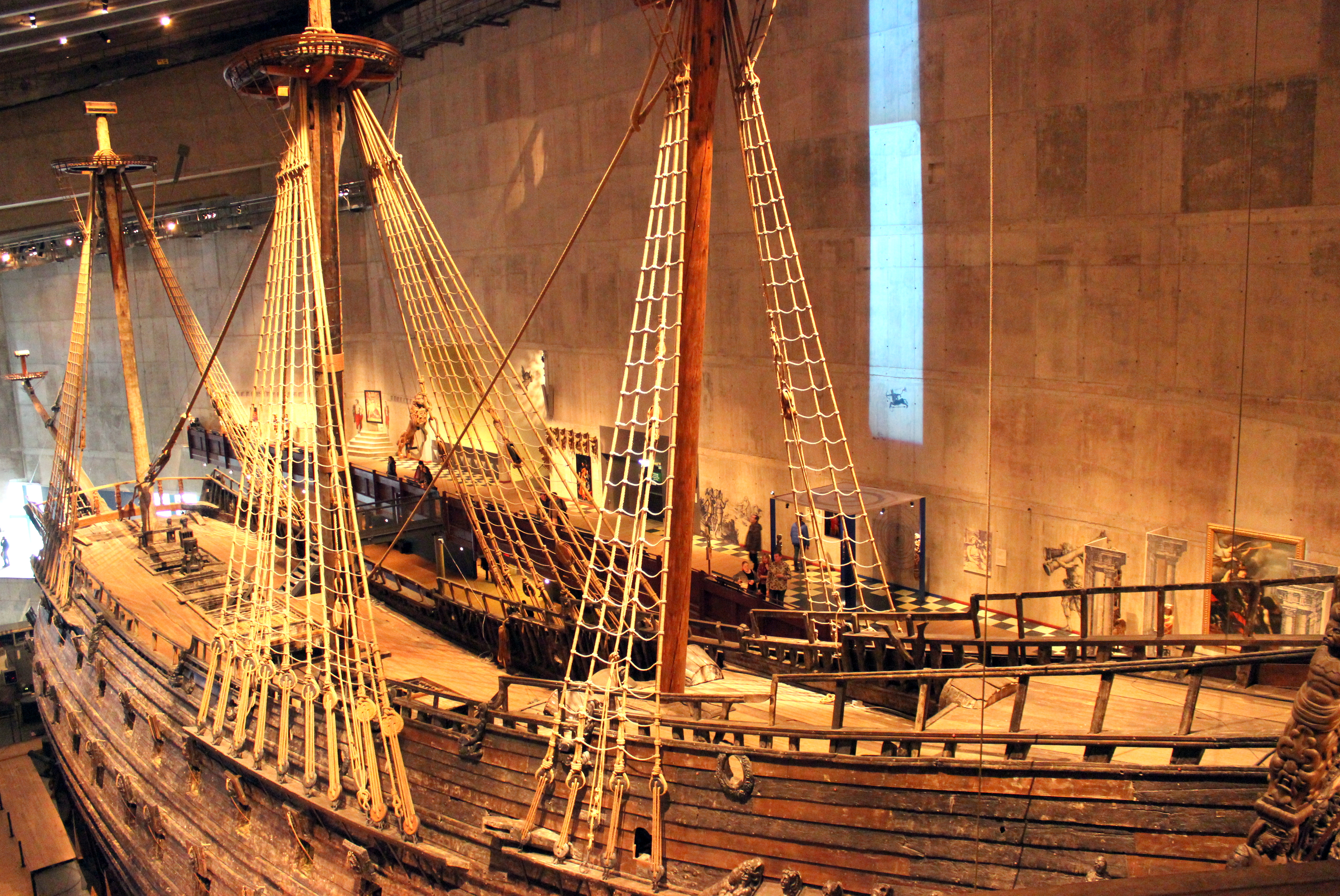
Vasa on display at Vasa Museum

Margareta Nilsdotter also called Margareta Hybertsson (d. 1630) was a Swedish businessperson and shipbuilder. In 1627, she completed construction of the Swedish warship Vasa.

Margareta is noted to have been a native Swede. She has been called Margareta Hybertsson, however both the last name of herself and her husband was patronymics, so the male patronymicon Hybertsson would not strictly have been hers, even if she is sometime mentioned as such.

She was first married to Dutch born master shipbuilder Henrik Hybertsson (dead 1627) who was engaged to build the Vasa in 1625. When she was widowed in 1627, she took over the share of her late spouse and the responsibility to complete the building of the Vasa, a task she fulfilled the following year. She handled a strike and a period of inflation during her tenure.

She inherited responsibility for completion of the contract, but while she was an accomplished businesswoman in her own right and had responsibility for the management of the rural estates which provided part of the family's income, she was not a shipbuilder. After a period of turbulence, the Crown appointed its representative in the navy yard, Captain Söfring Hansson, to manage the yard.

Aside from the Vasa, she was also more successfully involved in business as the owner of the estate Viby herrgård in Sollentuna.

When the Vasa sunk in 1628, it was deemed to be wrongly constructed, and she was bankrupted. She retired to the Viby estate and married the Swedish envoy to France, diplomat and nobleman Lars Nilsson Tungel (1582-1633).
