= Henrik Hybertsson =

Dutch master shipbuilder (died 1627)

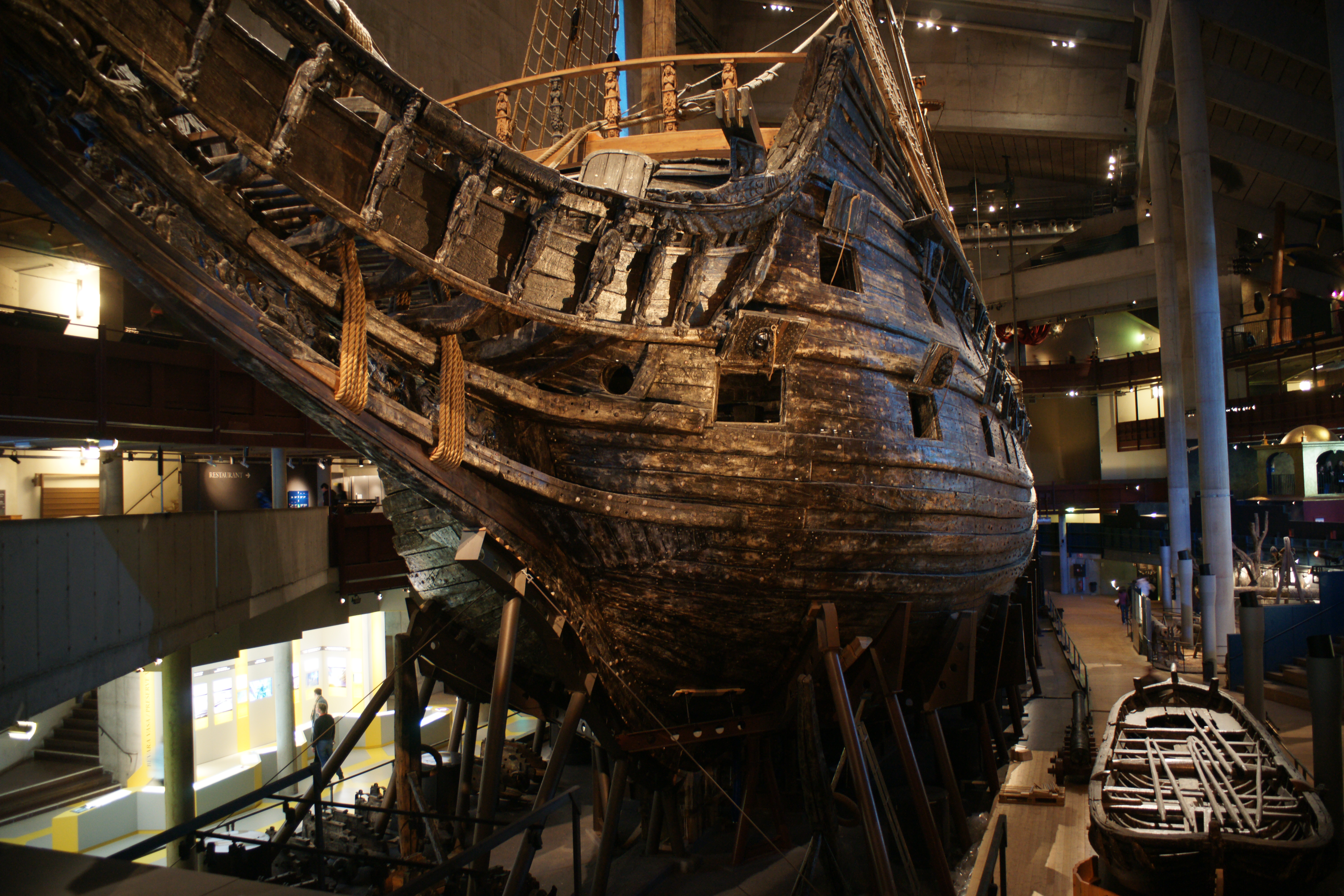
Vasa, one of the ships built by Henrik Hybertsson.

Henrik Hybertsson (or Hendrik Hubertsen) (died 1627) was a Dutch-born master shipbuilder working in the Stockholm navy yard in the early 17th century. He is mostly known for being the designer and constructor of the warship Vasa, which sank on its maiden voyage in 1628 and is now on display at the Vasa Museum.

Henrik came from the town of Rijswijk, near Den Haag in South Holland, and for a time in the 1590s was listed as a merchant in Amsterdam, before moving to Sweden at the beginning of the 17th century. Henrik was hired by the Swedish King Karl IX, at a time when the Royal Swedish Navy was expanding rapidly. He worked in Stockholm between 1603-1605 and again between 1611-1627. In between he was stationed at various shipyards in the country. After his return to Stockholm in 1611, he developed an association with the entrepreneur Anton Monier, who had leased the Crown's navy yard in 1620 under a new type of procurement contract, in which private businessmen took on the government's former role in producing war material. In 1621, Monier took Master Henrik into partnership.

During autumn 1624, as Monier's contract was running out, Admiral of the Realm Carl Carlsson Gyllenhielm, Vice Admiral Clas Larsson Fleming and Henrik Hybertsson began negotiating the terms of a four-year contract for maintenance and construction for the Swedish Navy. In December 1624. Henrik signed a preliminary version of this with the admiralty, and in January 1625 Henrik and another Dutch entrepreneur, Arent de Groote, signed the final version with King Gustav II Adolf. They would build four ships, two larger and two smaller, maintain existing ships, and manage the navy yard from January 1626 through the end of 1629. Vasa, laid down in February–March 1626 and launched in 1627, was the first of the large ships to be built under this contract. The other large ship, Äpplet, was laid down in 1627 and entered service in 1629. Neither of the smaller ships was built before the Crown cancelled all of its external contracts in the winter of 1628-29.

After Henrik Hybertsson's death in the late spring of 1627, his widow, Margareta Nilsdotter (d. 1630), inherited responsibility for completion of the contract, but while she was an accomplished businesswoman in her own right and had responsibility for the management of the rural estates which provided part of the family's income, she was not a shipbuilder. After a brief period of turbulence, the Crown appointed its representative in the navy yard, Captain Söfring Hansson, to manage the yard.

Henrik was survived by his wife, who was forced to sell some of their holdings in order to pay debts, and at least one son and two daughters, Margareta and Kristina.
