= 1691 in Sweden =

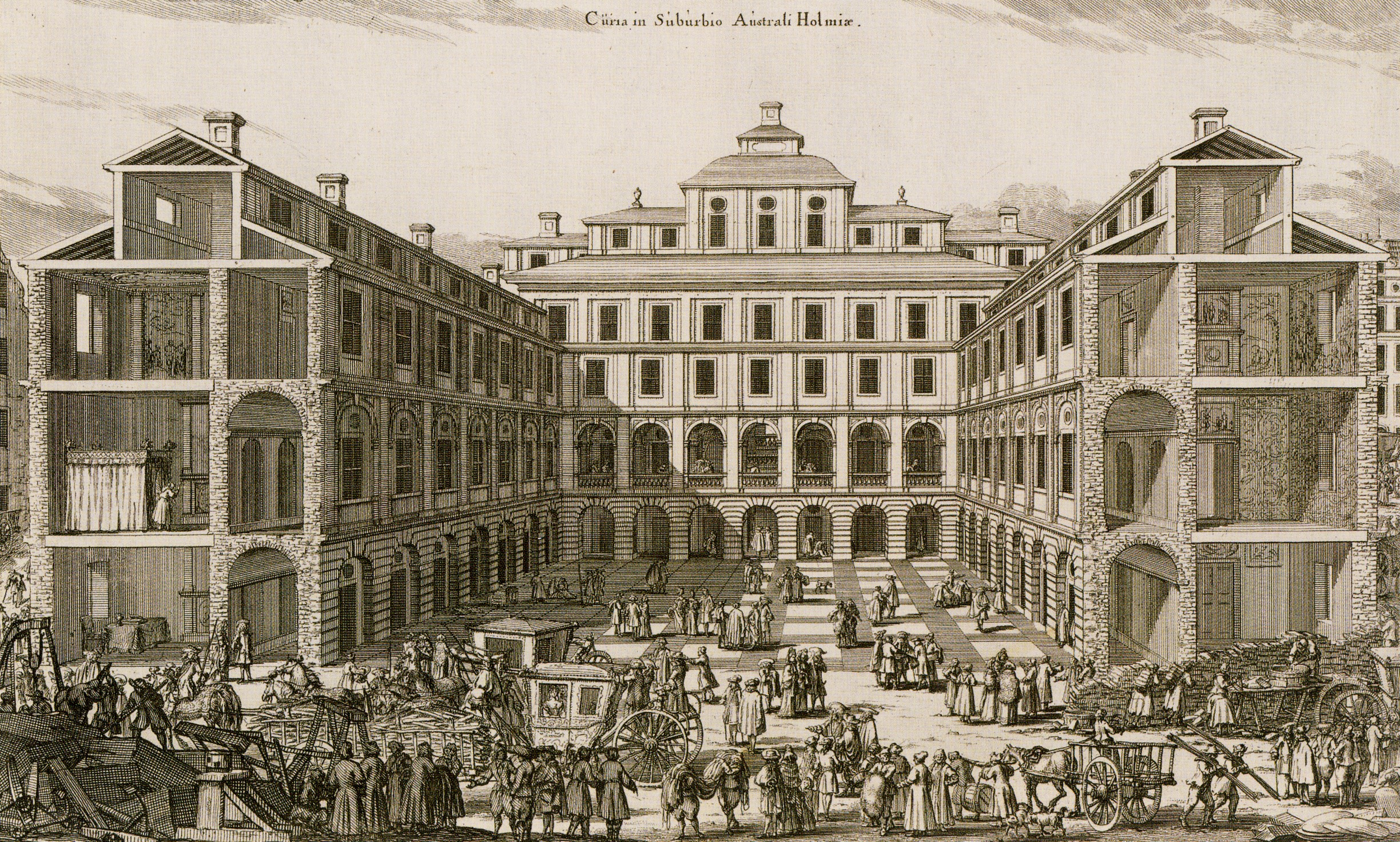
Construction work in Stockholm 1691; likely the first time the Mursmäckas are depicted

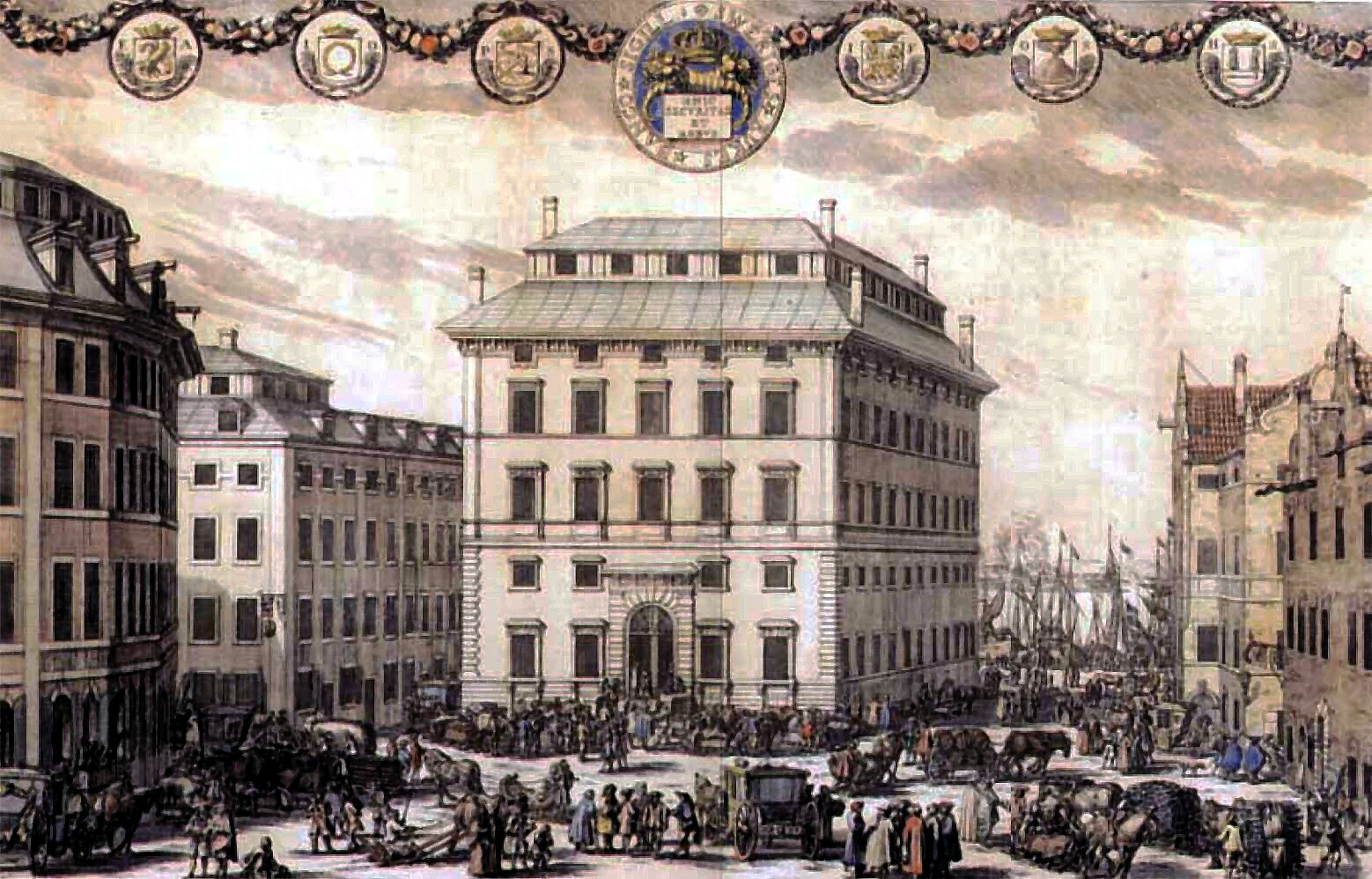

Events from the year 1691 in Sweden

== Incumbents ==
- Monarch – Charles XI

== Events ==
- - Barnängens manufaktur is established in Stockholm.
- - The city of Jönköping burns down.
- - The crops fail all over Sweden.
- Sven Andersson (farmworker) is executed for having sex with a nymph.
- The theater company Dän Swänska Theatren is dissolved.

== Births ==
- March 28 - Charles Emil Lewenhaupt, general (died 1743)
- Christina Beata Dagström, glassworks owner (died 1754)

== Deaths ==
- Sven Andersson (farmworker) (born 1668)
- Carl Billsten the elder, mill owner (born 1635)
- 17 February – Erlandus Svenonis Faxelius, (born 1629)
