= 1716 in Sweden =

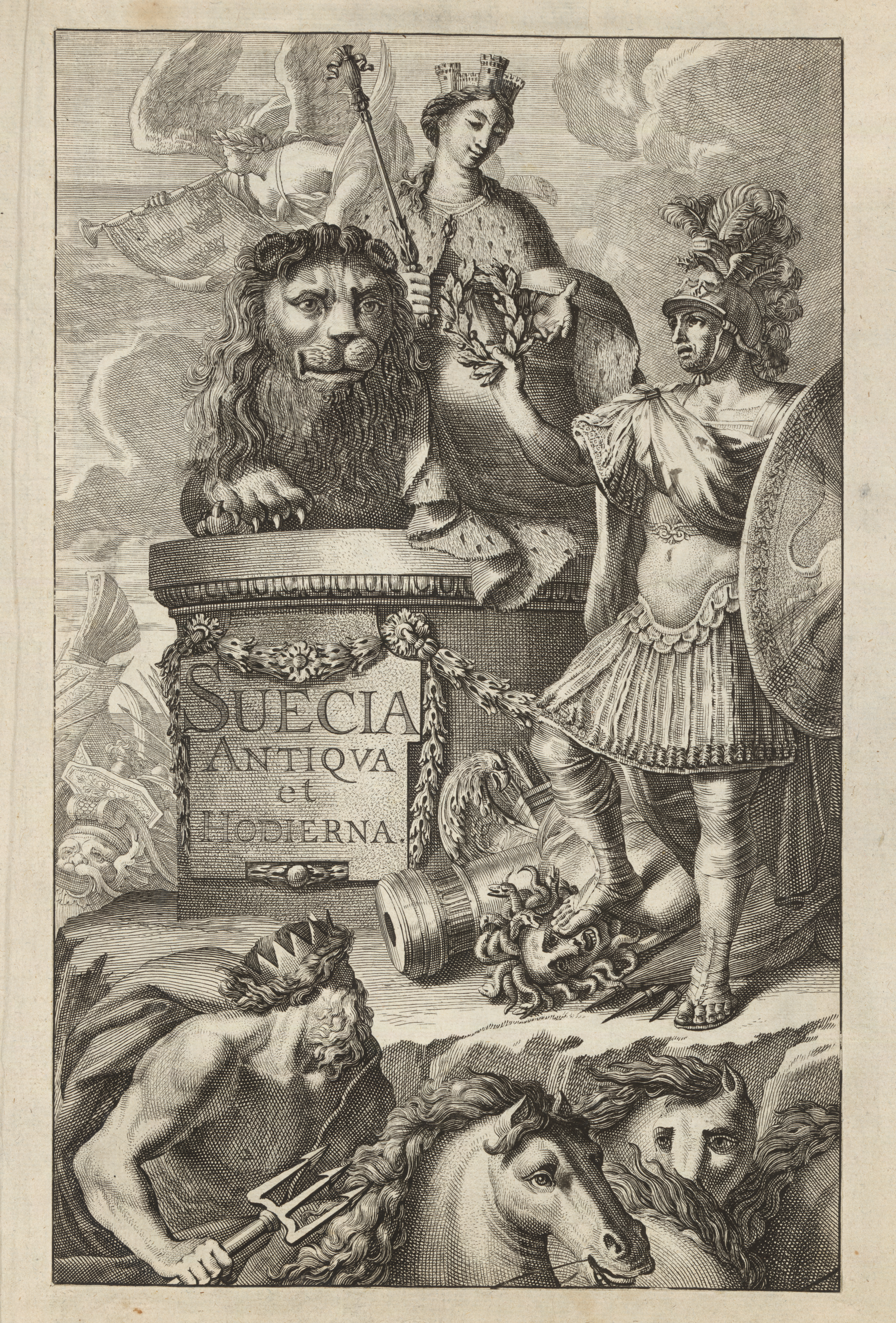
Title page of Suecia Antiqua et Hodierna

Events from the year 1716 in Sweden

== Incumbents ==
- Monarch – Charles XII

== Events ==
- February – Charles XII gives Georg Heinrich von Görtz the responsibility of internal affairs.
- April - Oslo conquered by Sweden.
- 8 April – Swedish Wismar is taken.
- 6 September – Charles XII makes Lund his base.
- - Suecia antiqua et hodierna by Erik Dahlbergh.

== Births ==
- 30 January – Carl Fredrik Adelcrantz, architect (died 1796)
- – Pehr Kalm, botanist, naturalist (died 1779)
- – Karl Gustaf Ekeberg, explorer (died 1784)
- – Anna Margareta Salmelin, war heroine (died 1789)
- – Helena Malheim, midwife (died 1795)

== Deaths ==
- – Carl Piper, politician (born 1647)
