= 1717 in Sweden =

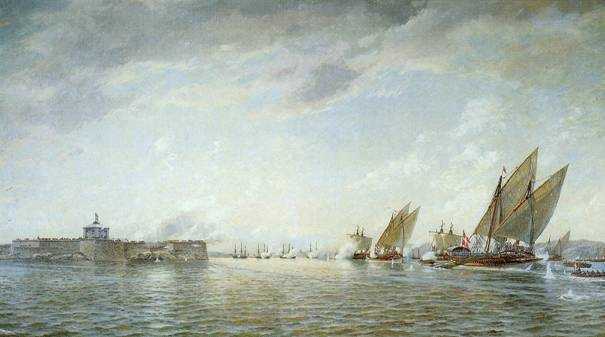
Fire exchange between Danish ships and the Älvsborg fortress

The following events occurred in Sweden in the year 1717.

== Incumbents ==
- Monarch – Charles XII

== Events ==
- 2 May - Battle of Göteborg
- 19 July - Battle of Strömstad

== Births ==
- 2 August - Karl Aurivillius, linguist, translator and orientalist (died 1786)
- 26 November - Olof af Acrel, physician and surgeon (died 1806)
- Date unknown - Elisabeth Lillström, stage actress and opera singer (died 1791)

== Deaths ==
- 16 January - Elias Brenner, painter, numismatist, and archeologist (born 1647)
- 23 February - Magnus Stenbock, military officer (born 1664)
- - Märta Berendes, courtier and memoir writer (born 1639)
