= 1677 in Sweden =

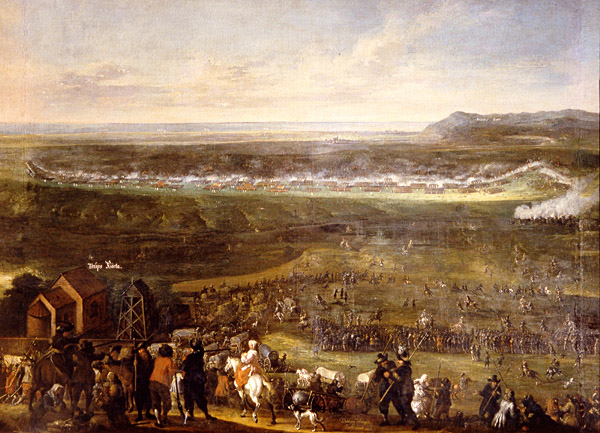
Battle of Tirups Hed by Johann Philip Lemke

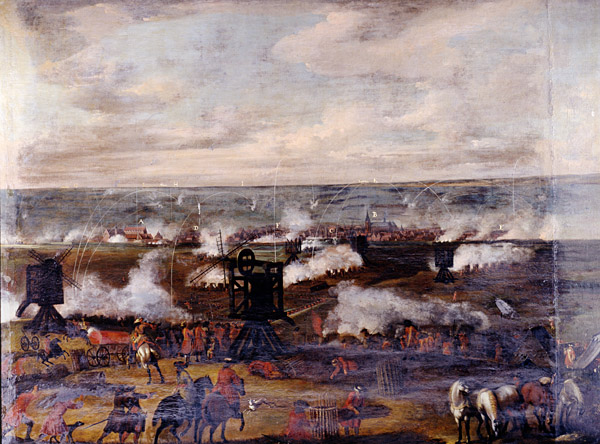
Battle of Malmö by Johann Philip Lemke

Events from the year 1677 in Sweden

== Incumbents ==
- Monarch – Charles XI

== Events ==
- May 31 – June 1 - Battle of Møn.
- June 11 – July 5 - Siege of Malmö.
- July 1 – July 2 - Battle of Køge Bay.
- July 14 - Battle of Landskrona.
- August 28 - Battle of Uddevalla.
- Tornedalens epos by Antti Keksi is published.

== Births ==
- 3 September - Jöran Nordberg, historian (died 1744)

== Deaths ==
- 21 January - Christina Anna Skytte, baroness and pirate (born 1643)
- Unknown, possibly March - Fet-Mats, miner and mummy (discovered 1719).
- 30 July - Fabian von Fersen, general, freelord, field-marshal and governor general (born 1626)
- 26 December - Bernhard Gustav of Baden-Durlach, general, Prince-abbot and cardinal (born 1631)
