= Clas Larsson Fleming =

Swedish admiral naval officer and nobleman (1592–1644)

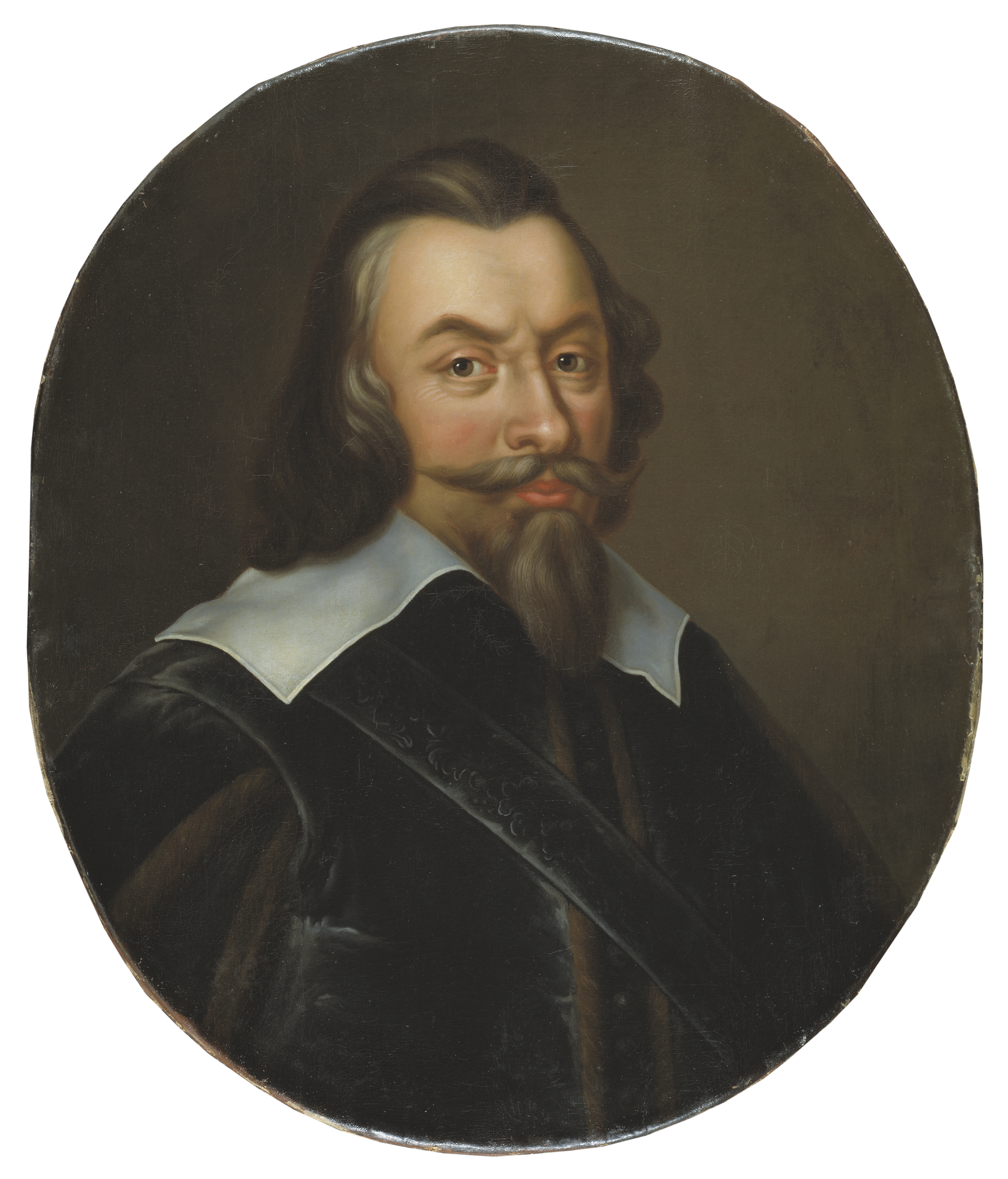
- Born: March 1592; Askainen, Finland, Kingdom of Sweden
- Died: 27 July 1644 (aged 52); Near Kiel, Holy Roman Empire
- Occupation: Naval officer

Clas Larsson Fleming (March 1592 – 27 July 1644) was a Swedish naval officer and nobleman involved in the development of a formal management structure for the Swedish Navy during the reigns of King Gustavus Adolphus and Queen Christina. He is remembered as one of the ablest administrators in the history of the Swedish Navy, and is in many ways a typical example of the type of aristocrat who served the Swedish Crown during the period of Sweden's imperial expansion.

== Biography ==
He was the son of Lars Hermansson Fleming, the governor of Åbo (Turku) in present-day Finland. He was born at Villnäs (Askainen) in Finland and began his military career in the army, as a cornet in the Field Marshal's Guards Company. In 1620 he began his naval service as a vice admiral and rear admiral, and served as the commander of a number of squadrons and fleets in the following years. He was away from Sweden with the navy for most of the campaigning seasons in the 1620s, but returned to Stockholm in the winters. Admirals were also administrative officers, and Fleming became a central figure in the administration of naval procurement. When the office of holmamiral, the official responsible for managing the state dockyard and arsenal in Stockholm, fell open in 1625, it was not filled for six years, but Fleming essentially fulfilled the duties of the office. During this period the dockyard was not under direct Crown control but was leased by private entrepreneurs, Henrik Hybertsson and Arendt de Groote. They built the large warship Vasa, which sank on its maiden voyage on 10 August 1628. Fleming had been involved in the negotiations of the original contract and in maintaining Crown control over the entrepreneurs, and was present at a demonstration of the ship's lack of stability about a month before the ship sailed.

In the 1630s, Fleming went to sea less and took on a variety of civil administrative tasks. He presided over the Crown's accounting office and was a member of the Royal Council. From 1634 until his death he was the first governor-general of Stockholm, an office created under the 1634 Form of Government. As part of his duties he was involved in the planning of the city of Stockholm and the moving of the navy's dockyard from its original home on what is now Blasieholmen to the island of Skeppsholmen, which remained the main Stockholm naval base until the later 20th century. He played an instrumental role in organizing the expedition that established New Sweden, a Swedish colony in modern-day Delaware, in 1637.

He was also an industrialist, and in the 1630s established an ironworks at Vira, which produced weaponry for the Swedish armies in the Thirty Years' War. The ironworks still exists as a museum of 17th-century technology.

He returned to a major sea command in 1644, during the Torstenson War with Denmark-Norway. He commanded the ships sent to attack the Danish fleet and land troops on the southern Danish coast, and on 1 July, directed the Swedish forces in the Battle of Kolberger Heide, in which the Danish fleet prevented the Swedish landing. He was killed in action several weeks later, on 27 July 1644, on board his flagship, Scepter, near Kiel.

== Personal life ==
Clas was born to Lars Hermansson Fleming and Anna Henriksdotter Horn af Kanckas. His grandfathers were both notable military men and statesmen; his maternal grandfather was Governor-General Henrik Klasson Horn (c. 1512 – 1595), and his paternal grandfather was Admiral Herman Persson Fleming (c. 1520 – 1583).

His children included Admiral Herman Claesson Fleming af Liebelitz (1619–1673) and Lars Claesson Fleming af Liebelitz (1621–1699), who served as Chamberlain for Queen Christina.

== Gallery ==
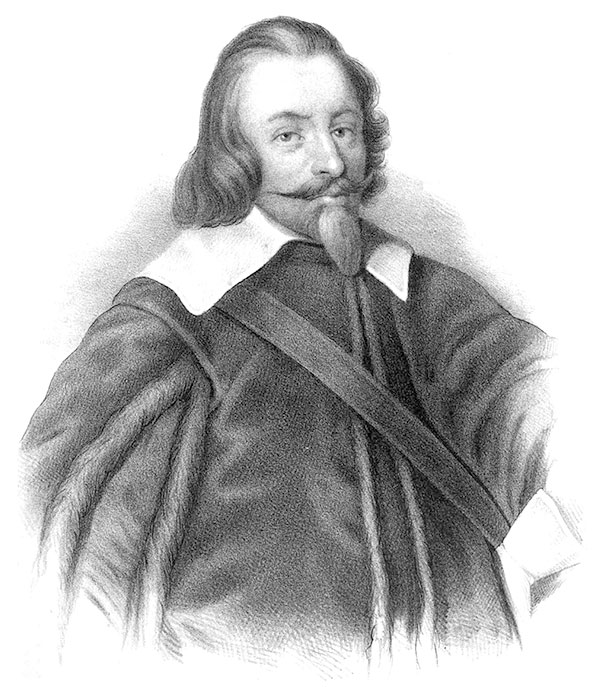
Portrait of Fleming

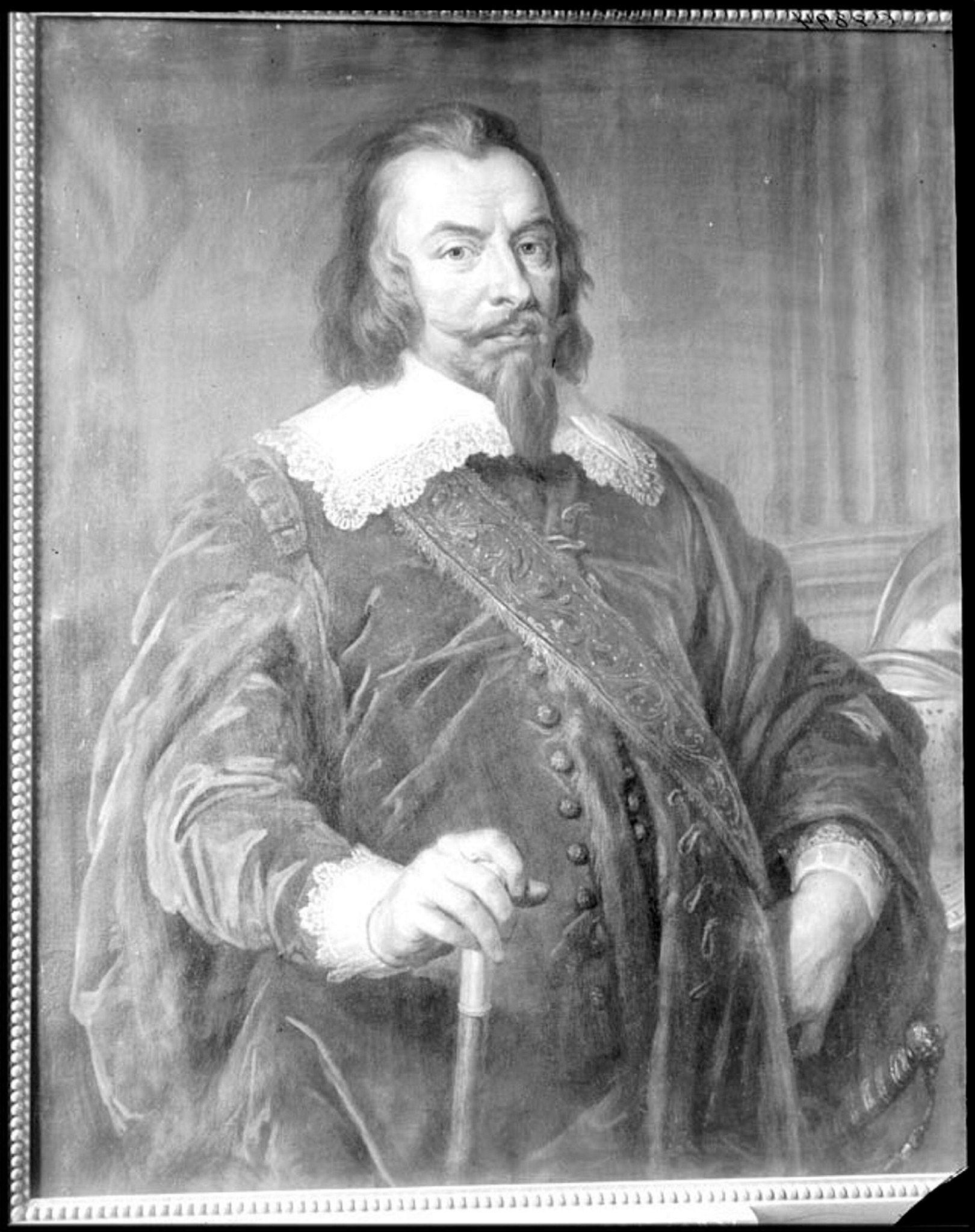
Portrait in the Stockholm Court House

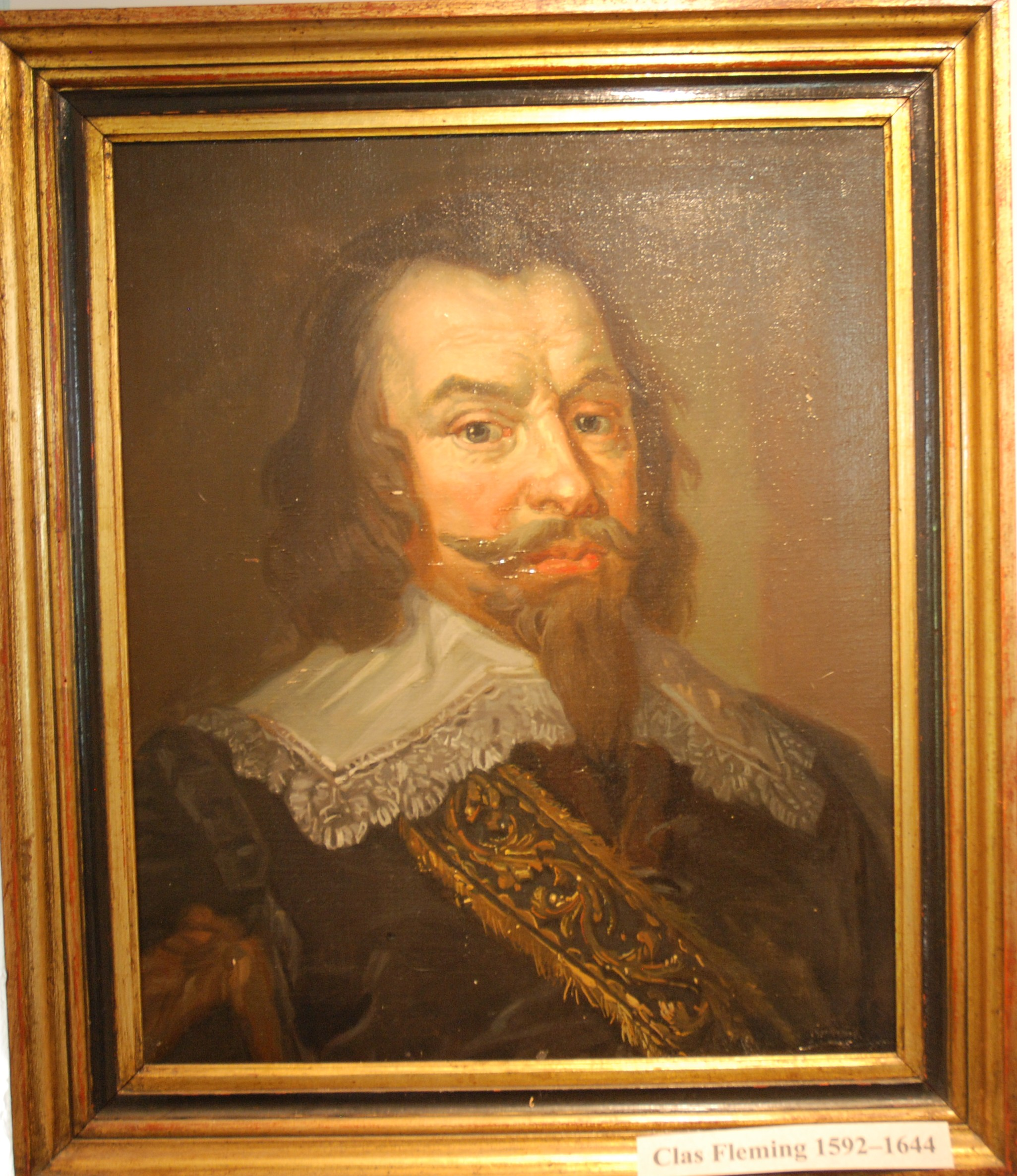
17th century portrait, Wira Bruks Museum

1801 silver medal by Carl Enhörning

== See also ==
- Fleming of Louhisaari

== Other sources ==
- Cederlund, Carl Olof (2006) Vasa I, The Archaeology of a Swedish Warship of 1628, series editor: Fred Hocker ISBN 91-974659-0-9
- Zettersten, Axel (1890) Svenska Flottans Historia Åren 1522–1634. Stockholm. (in Swedish)
