= Anna von Hintzen =

Anna von Hintzen, also called von Hinske (died after 1648) was a Swedish (originally Baltic German) noble, who figured in a famous scandal around a murder.

She was born to a Baltic-German colonel from Riga in Swedish Latvia, and married to the Swedish noble Nils Ribbing (1590–1641), governor of Kalmar Castle, with whom she had seven children; her daughter Catharina Ribbing married Anton von Steinberg, a favorite of Queen Christina of Sweden.

Anna von Hintzen was described as a sadistic employer. In 1639, she murdered a female domestic and a servant boy and a scandal ensued. She fled to Denmark to avoid arrest, followed by her spouse, who was deposed from his position. The couple settled in Lübeck, where she was widowed. In 1648, she was acknowledged as a member of the Swedish nobility despite her crime by the royal government in Sweden. She did not return however.

Von Hintzen died in Lübeck and was buried in Wismar.
