= 1680 in Sweden =

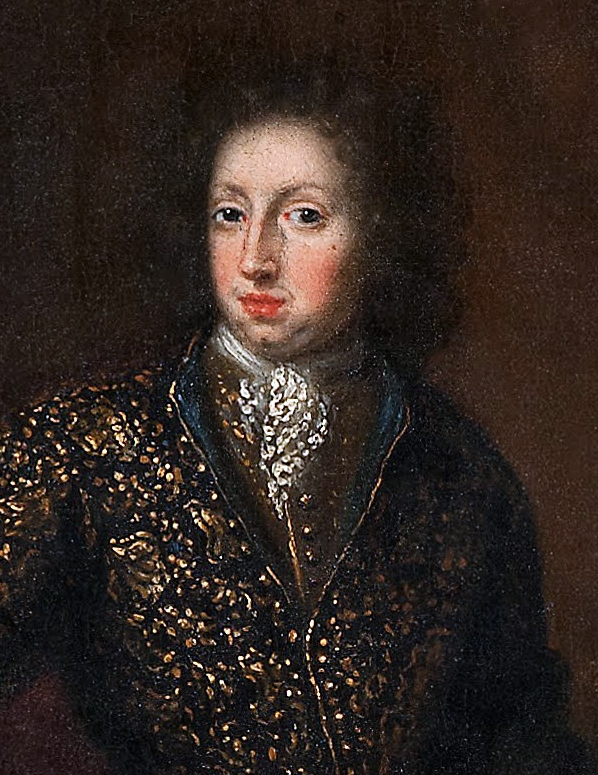
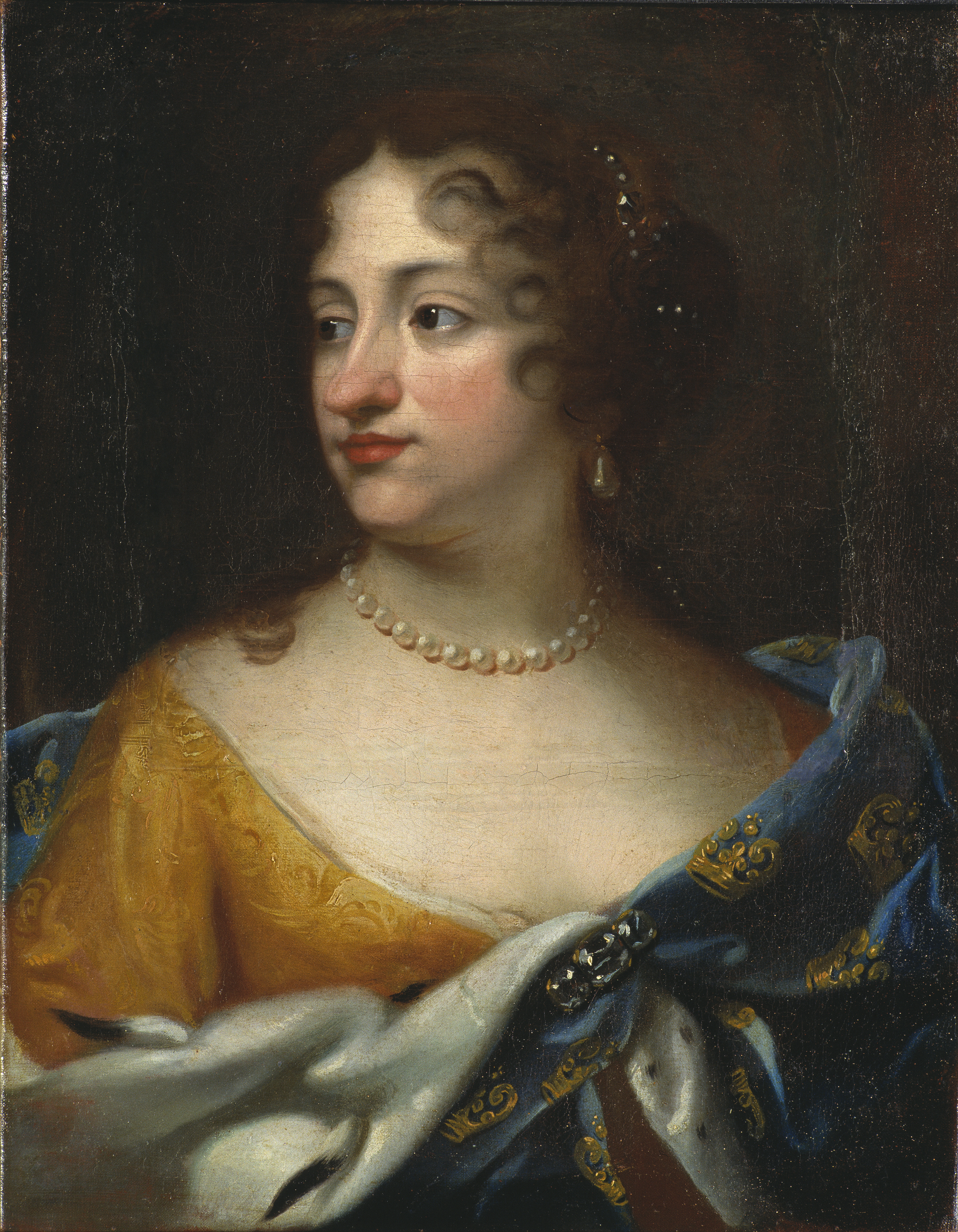
Charles XI of Sweden and Ulrika Eleonora of Denmark

Events from the year 1680 in Sweden

== Incumbents ==
- Monarch – Charles XI

== Events ==
- Wedding between the King and Ulrika Eleonora of Denmark.
- In the Riksdagen 1680, Charles XI introduces absolute monarchy in Sweden by banning the council from making suggestions unless asked to bey the monarch.
- Great Reversion also served to curtail the political and economic influence of the nobility, further consolidating Charles XI’s absolute rule.
- During the Riksdag, the Great Reversion was introduced: The Baronies and Counties of the nobility, the donations from the foreign provinces, and all donations worth more than 600 silver a year was reverted to the crown, which led to the confiscation of about 80 percent of all the property donated from the crown to the high nobility during the 17th-century.
- Wenerid by Skogekär Bergbo.

== Deaths ==
- 10 June - Johan Göransson Gyllenstierna, statesman (born 1635)
- 2 September - Per Brahe the Younger, statesman (born 1602)
- Debora van der Plas, business person (born 1616)
