= 1569 in Sweden =

Nils Turesson Bielke.

Events from the year 1569 in Sweden

The events of 1569 reflect a turbulent period in Sweden's history, marked by political changes, conflicts with neighboring Denmark–Norway, and significant developments within the Swedish nobility and monarchy.

== Incumbents ==
- Monarch – John III John III, King of Sweden from 1569, succeeded his half-brother Eric XIV after a rebellion. He aimed to reconcile the Lutheran Church of Sweden with the Catholic Church and had a significant family connection when his son Sigismund later ruled both Sweden and Poland-Lithuania.

== Events ==
- 26 January - The deposition of Eric XIV in favor of John III is formally confirmed by the royal council.
- 10 July - Coronation of John III and Catherine Jagiellon.
- 24 October - Sweden invades the Danish province of Scania.
- 29 October - Sweden conquer Åhus.
- October - Denmark–Norway besieges Varberg.
- 13 November - Peace negotiations between Sweden and Denmark in Knäred.
- 4 December - Denmark–Norway conquers Varberg.
- Armistice between Sweden and Denmark–Norway in Estonia.
- The 1569 Plot, a conspiracy to free the deposed king from prison is discovered and the conspirators are executed.

== Births ==
- 25 March - Abraham Persson Brahe, (died 16 March 1630)
- 5 November - Nils Turesson Bielke, statesman, member of the privy council (died 1639)

== Deaths ==
- - Elin Andersdotter, conspirator (born unknown date)
- - Thomas Jakobsson, conspirator (born unknown date)
