= 1679 in Sweden =

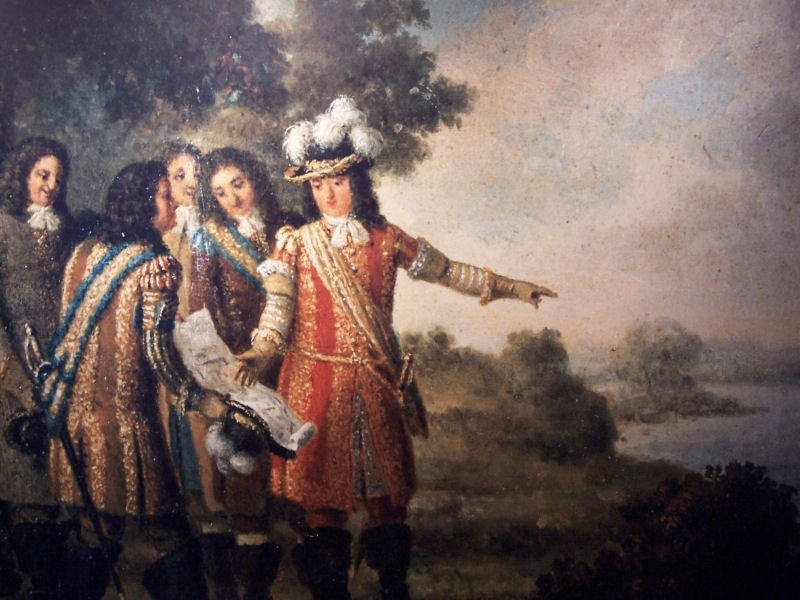
Karlskrona founding fathers

Events from the year 1679 in Sweden

== Incumbents ==
- Monarch – Charles XI

== Events ==
- Treaties of Nijmegen
- 5 February 1679 (NS) / 26 January 1679 (OS) – Treaty of Celle
- 19 June – Treaty of Saint-Germain-en-Laye (1679)
- 16 September (O.S.) / 26 September – The Peace of Lund ends the Scanian War between Denmark–Norway and the Swedish Empire.
- Atlantica (Atland eller Manheim in Swedish) by Olaus Rudbeck, where he purported to prove that Sweden was Atlantis, the cradle of civilization, and Swedish the original language of Adam from which Latin and Hebrew had evolved.

== Births ==
- 7 March – Carl Gyllenborg, politician and writer (died 1744)
- Magnus Bromelius, physician and paleontologist (died 1731)

== Deaths ==
- November – Lisbetha Olsdotter, female soldier and cross dresser (year of birth unknown)
