= Catharina Wallenstedt =

Swedish writer and courtier

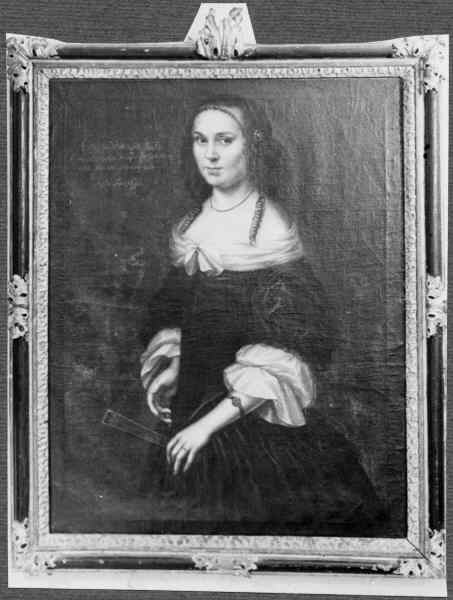

Catharina Wallenstedt (née Wallia; 1627 – 1719) was a Swedish writer and courtier, known for her collection of letters. Composed of a collection of about 350 letters written between 1673 and 1718, mostly to her spouse and daughter Greta, they have been the object of research.

== Life ==
Catharina Wallenstedt was born in 1627. She was the daughter of Bishop Laurentius Olai Wallius and Catharina Tidemansdotter, and was ennobled alongside her siblings in 1650. She was maid of honour to Queen Christina of Sweden in 1649–1655. In 1655 she married Edvard Ehrenstéen (died 1686). She was the mother-in-law to Nils Gyldenstolpe and Arvid Horn.

Wallenstedt was a prolific letter writer, and is known for her collection of letters. There are several hundred surviving letters written between 1673 and 1718, mostly to her spouse and daughter Greta (Margareta). The letters have been the object of research, and a printed volume of 350 of them was published by historian Christian Wijkmark. Wallenstedt's letters reveal her concerns about providing financially for her family, her children's futures, and give insight into her tasks running an estate.

Wallenstedt died in 1719, in Stockholm, aged 92 years. She was portrayed in the "Teckningar ur svenska adelns familjelif i gamla tider" by Ellen Fries (1895).
