= 1688 in Sweden =

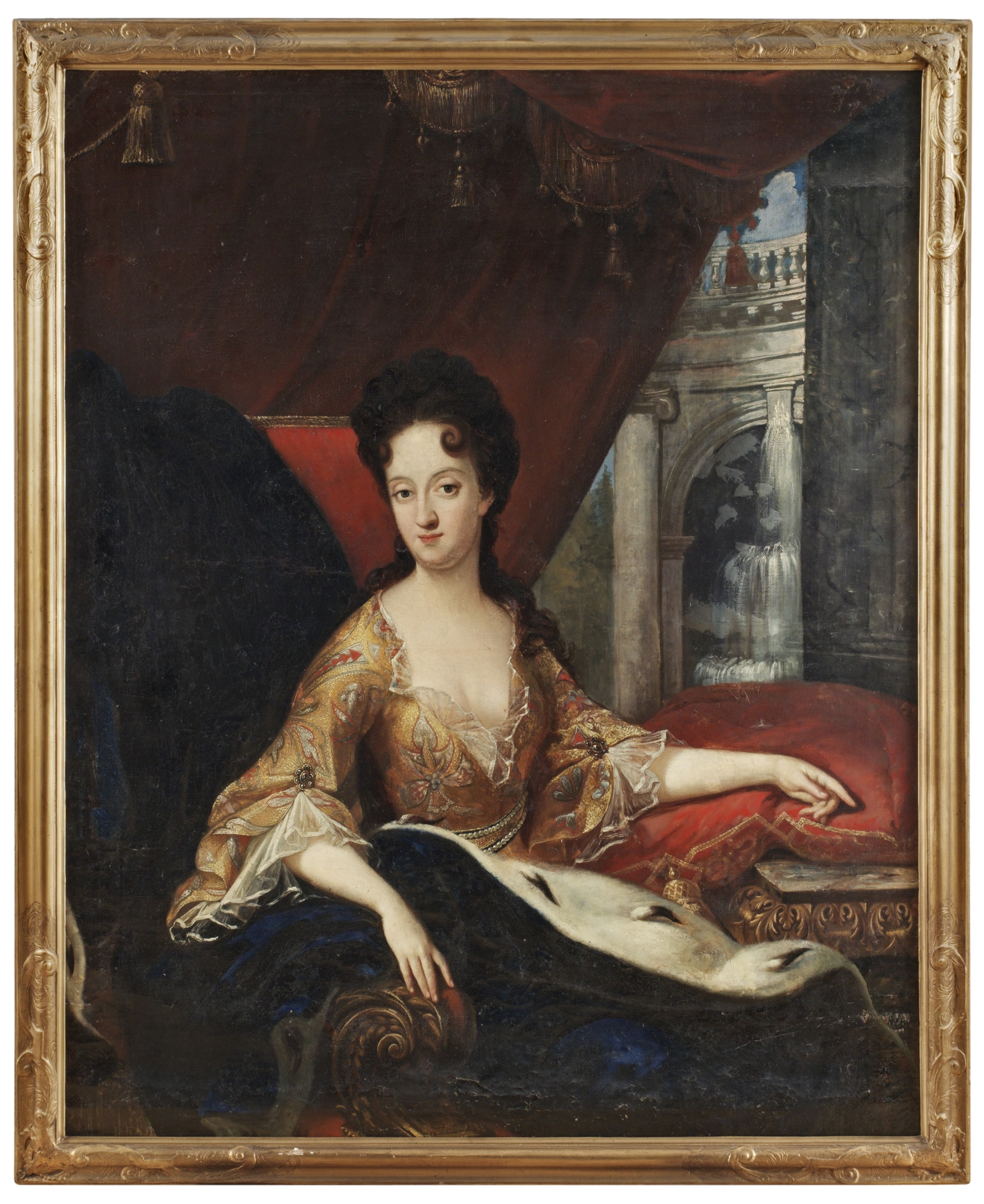
Ulrika Eleonora

Events from the year 1688 in Sweden

== Incumbents ==
- Monarch – Charles XI

== Events ==
- The monarch extends the Great Reversion to Swedish Livonia.
- Coffee is served in public in Stockholm for the first time.
- The religious process against the dissident Lars Ulstadius

== Births ==
- 23 January - Ulrika Eleonora, Queen of Sweden, monarch and queen consort (died 1741)
- 29 January - Emanuel Swedenborg, scientist, philosopher, theologian, revelator, and mystic (died 1772)

== Deaths ==
- Maria Dauerer, pharmacist (apothecary) (born 1624)
- 15 September - Otto Wilhelm Königsmarck, military officer (born 1639)
