= Christina Nyman =

Swedish brewer

Christina Nyman known as Madam Nyman (1719–1795) was a Swedish brewer. She was a major figure in contemporary Stockholm business life and known as a benefactor of culture. She is perhaps most known for establishing the Stenborg Theatre in partnership with Carl Stenborg (1784). She, as well as her brothers and nephews, belonged to the political allies of king Gustav III of Sweden among the merchant class, and he reportedly treated her as a valuable partner.

== Life ==
Christina Nyman was the daughter of the wealthy brewer Lorenz Eriksson Westman (1690–1730) and Magdalena Lütkeschwager Lorentz, and married the wealthy brewer Nils Jonasson Nyman (d. 1762). She had only one child, her daughter Christina (1740–1791), whose sons were her heirs.

After the death of her spouse in 1762, she managed his business, including both his brewery as well as real estate. She was described as a brusque and authoritarian, stout woman, but also as warmhearted, charitable and with sufficient moral courage to put any person in place, regardless of social class, when they were in the wrong. She enjoyed theatre and a large social life, often entertained and had guests from both the nobility and burgher class.

Several anecdotes are known about Nyman. At one occasion, two male guests from the nobility was said to have praised her hospitality on the grounds that, as they were in a burgher house and not among their own class, they did not have to bother about manners but put their arms on the table, upon which Nyman replied: "If you join my pigs you may enjoy your comfort in that regard - you may lay down in their trough completely." According to one version of this story, these noblemen were in fact the two princely brothers of the king, Gustav III: Christina Nyman and her brothers were valuable allies of the king among the burgher estate and the king "displayed his polite attention to her numerous times".

== Legacy ==
Bellman described her in his writings. She is portrayed in the play En konung by Oscar Wijkander (1870).
