= 1643 in Sweden =

Events from the year 1643 in Sweden

== Incumbents ==
- Monarch – Christina

== Events ==
=== January ===
- Chancellor Axel Oxenstierna issues an order that all archives, letters, and records seized during military campaigns must be inventoried, secured, and transported across the Baltic Sea to the Imperial Archives in Stockholm.

=== Undated ===
- Johan Björnsson Printz is appointed governor of the Swedish colony of New Sweden until 1653.
- Swedish forces, under the direction of Chancellor Oxenstierna, prepare for the Torstenson War against Denmark-Norway.

== Births ==
- 13 January - Axel Wachtmeister, field marshal (died 1699)
- 9 November - Christina Anna Skytte, baroness and pirate (died 1677)
- 24 December - Israel Kolmodin, hymnwriter and Lutheran priest (died 1709)
- Olof Bergh - Cape Dutch explorer and VOC official

== Deaths ==
- 10 December - Herman Wrangel, military officer
- Bengt Bengtsson Oxenstierna, diplomat, Privy Councillor (born 1591)
- Mickel Nilsson, blacksmith in New Sweden
