= Helena Malheim =

Swedish midwife

Helena Malheim (1716–1795) was a Swedish midwife. She became a midwife in around 1751 and worked in Vänersborg.

== Life and career ==
Malheim was born in 1716 in Uppland. Her father, Justus Andreas (1689-1731), was a field surgeon, and her mother, Helena Tolstadia, was the daughter of a clergyman. She lived with her mother and maternal grandparents while her father was on active service for King Karl XII until he returned in 1718. He then retired from the army and the family moved to S:t Johannesgatan 5, Uppsala, near the location of present day Uplands nation. Her mother died when she was 14 years old and her father died 10 months later. In 1739, she married Anders Ekström, an iron merchant, and they moved close to Uppsala Castle, near Trädgårdsgatan 5A. They had at least 9 children, the first of which was born in 1741.

She trained to be a midwife around 1751 and became a municipal midwife in Vänersborg. She had an annual salary of 100 daler silver coins along with her rent. In 1756, she made a complaint to the town council about the untrained women who assisted childbirth as all midwives had to pass an exam. In the same year, she wrote a manuscript on childbirth and midwifery and sent it to the medical college but it was turned down.

She also asked permission from the college to train women so that each parish of the Älvsborg and Dalsland had a midwife.

She attended a gathering at the Stockholm medical college on 12 July 1758. She also attended a meeting on 24 July where the college granted permission to teach women about midwifery however they could not take the midwives oath as women were only allowed to become midwives at the Stockholm medical college. They also declined to publish her writing as they viewed it as unfinished.

She wrote several letters to the Vänersborg council requesting an increase in pay and threatened to move to Uddevalla where she would receive higher wages. Despite Malheim having the backing of the mayor and town doctor, the council refused to increase her salary and instead gave her husband, who was an unwaged councilor, an annual salary instead. She petitioned the council again in 1759 to wage increase and promised that she would treat the poor free of charge and the council agreed.

Her husband died in 1773. When a fire broke out in the town in 1777 she was living with her daughter, Ulrika. Their home, along with two-thirds of the town, was destroyed. She lived with her daughter until 1784. In 1795, she died in Vänersborg poorhouse.
