= Greta Duréel =

Swedish noblewoman involved in bank fraud in the 1690s

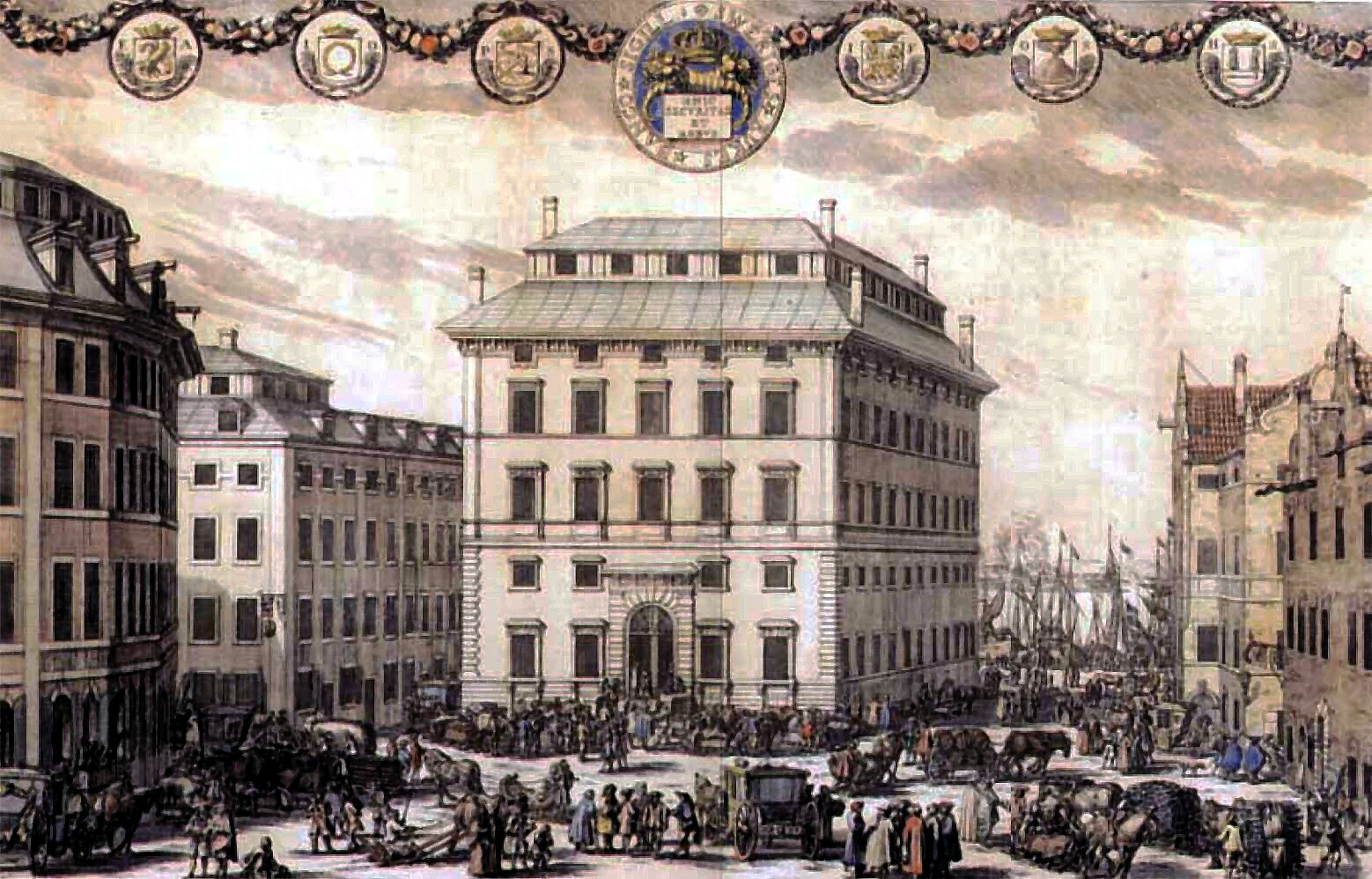
Swedish National Bank in 1691.

Margaretha "Greta" Brita Duréel (died in June 1696) was a Swedish noble. She was the central figure in the stora juvelsveket (The Great Jewel Fraud), a fraud committed against the Swedish National Bank by a group of women in the 1690s.

Greta Duréel was the daughter of the noble Peter Nilsson Duréel and married the noble courtier Arvid Appelgren in 1683.

At that time, it was possible to be given loans from the Swedish National Bank in exchange for a Pledge (law) of personal property. The pledges were examined and approved by the jeweler Paul Wijkman, but once inspected and sealed, they were placed in the bank without further inspections. Duréel hired the wife of an ensign, Maria Eriksdotter, as a liaison. Maria Eriksdotter collected the boxes containing the pledges after they had been approved and brought them to her. Duréel emptied the boxes of their content, replaced them with worthless objects, and sealed them again using the forged seal of Wijkman. Thereafter, the forged pledges were given as security for loans from the bank.

Greta Duréel and her female accomplices acquired large sums from the bank using this method: Duréel herself about 60,000 dir., Margaretha Hoffvenia 30,000, Maria Eriksdotter 3,000–6,000 and Greta Appelgren, née Törnsköld, 3,000 dir.

In 1694, the fraud was exposed by the bank. Maria Eriksdotter was arrested and exposed Duréel under torture. Greta Duréel was at the time terminally ill, but confessed shortly before her death of natural causes. Maria Eriksdotter was executed by decapitation in 1699. Margaretha Hoffvenia and Greta Törnsköld were, however, freed due to lack of proof.
