= Brita Persdotter Karth =

Fictional Swedish historical figure

Brita Persdotter Karth is a fictional person in Swedish history. She was earlier believed to have been the mistress or perhaps even wife of the exiled prince Gustav of Sweden, son of king Eric XIV, and her eldest son Lars was believed to have been the forefather of the noble Swedish families of Eldstierna and Stierneld.

== The story behind the legend ==
The history about Brita Karth and her alleged children with prince Gustav was the product of baron Adolf Ludvig Stierneld (1755-1835), courtier and a well-known collector of historical documents, whom historians have later found also to be a ruthless forger of such documents. Wishing to claim a royal ancestry for his own family Stierneld reported having found handwritten notes by Brita Karth herself regarding her relation and family with Gustav in an old pious book that was to have been given to her by Gustav's mother, Karin Månsdotter.

Although Stierneld's claims were at the time accepted by the Swedish House of Nobility they were also soon refuted by historians and genealogists, beginning with an essay by A.T.G. Oxenstierna in 1869 and later by noted archivist and genealogist Victor Örnberg (1839-1908) in Svenska ättartal. Today Brita Karth and her children are regarded as completely fictional.

== Brita Karth according to the legend ==
Brita Karth was said to have been born about 1568 in Silesia as the daughter of a Swedish warrior named Peder Karth and to have died somewhere after 1594. She is said to have married prince Gustav in Kashin in Russia in 1594 after already having delivered four children of his: Lars (or Laurentius) (1586-1660), Eric (1588-?), Carl Gustav (1590-?) and Catherine Sigrid (1592-?).
