= Battle of Botkyrka =

Battle between rebels and Eric XIV

- Part of the Uprising against Erik XIV
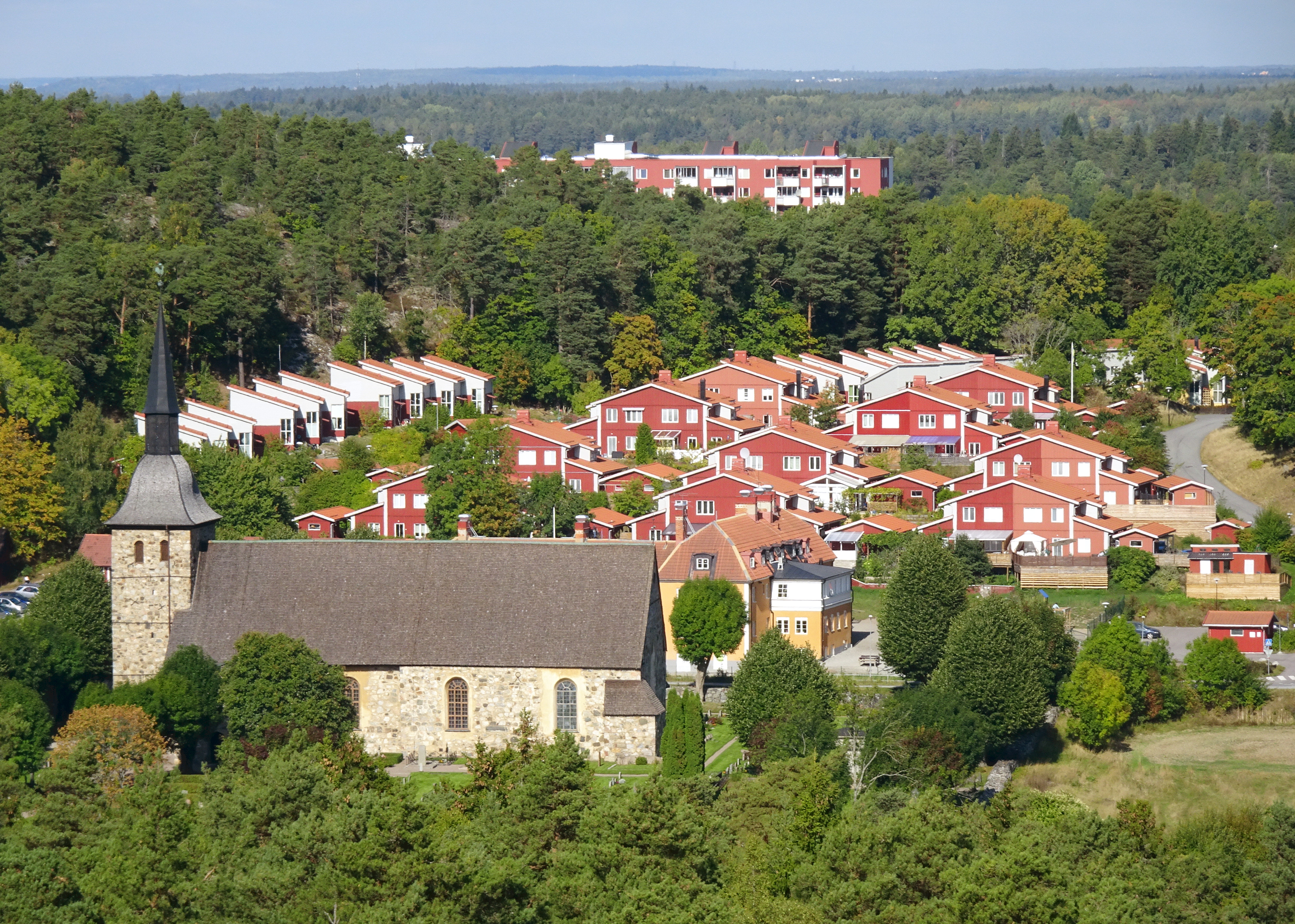
- Image taken in 2016 showing the Botkyrka church, where the battle took place.
Date	31 August 1568
Location	Botkyrka
Result	Victory for Eric XIV
Territorial changes	Duke John and Charles retreat to the Mälaren

Insurgents-Government
Rebels	Sweden

Commanders and leaders
Pontus De la Gardie; Duke John; Duke Charles	Erik XIV

Units involved
Unknown	Hovfanan; Upplandsfanan; Gårdsfanan; Lifeguard

Strength
670 pikemen 400 cavalry 120 hand cannon shooters (Note: Vanguard)	5,000 infantry 1,000 cavalry

Casualties and losses
Unknown	Unknown

The Battle of Botkyrka was an incident where an army under Erik XIV and the Pontus De la Gardie, along with the dukes Charles and John met in Botkyrka in 1568 during the ongoing uprising against Erik XIV. It resulted in a victory for Erik, forcing the dukes to retreat.

== Background ==
On 19 August, in the midst of his rebellion against the king, Erik XIV, Duke John rode out at the head of ten banners of German and Scottish and eight banners of Swedish cavalry towards Södermanland all while the troops still loyal to the king gradually switched sides and joined the rebels.

When word reached Erik that the rebels had reached Södertälje, and was now on its way towards Stockholm, he quickly organized the troops who were still loyal to him and quickly marched to meet the rebels head on. The forces still loyal to Erik were the Hovfanan, Upplandsfanan, One banner of "black cavalry" (Svarta ryttare), Eight Fähnlein's of cavalry from Finland, Norrland, Dalarna, and Roslagen, Gårdsfanan, and the Life Guards. In total, Erik's army consisted of around 5,000 infantry and 1,000 cavalry.

It is not unclear how large the rebel army was, but it consisted of nine banners and 15 Fähnlein's, therefore likely larger than Erik's force. However, one historian has claimed that the rebel vanguard consisted of 670 pikemen, 400 cavalry, and 120 handgunners.

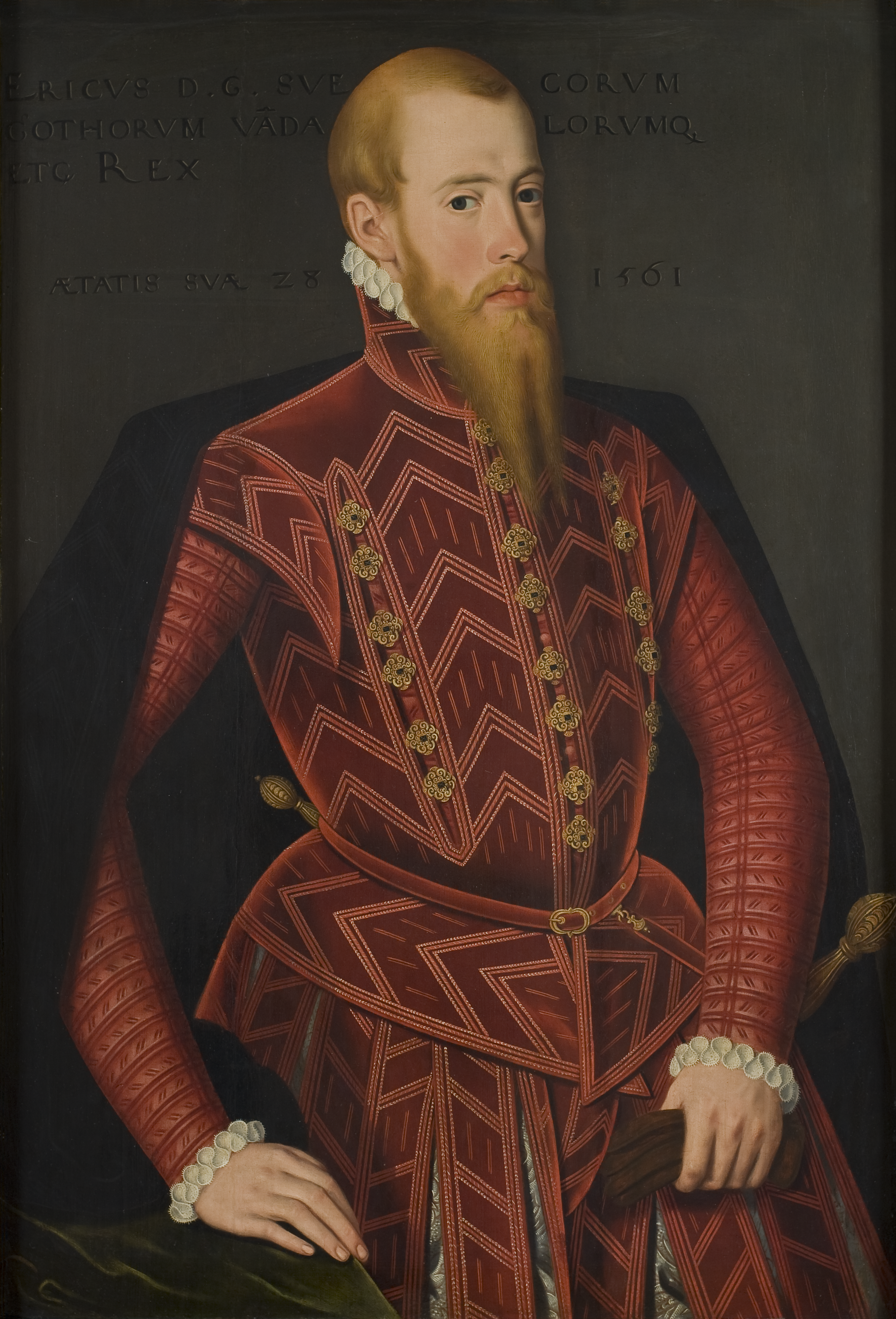
Portrait of Erik XIV by Domenicus Verwilt

== Battle ==
On 31 August, the two vanguards of the armies clashed at Botkyrka's church. Erik personally led 700 men in an assault against the advanced vanguard of the rebel army, led by Pontus De la Gardie. Erik sent a group of shooters to take up positions behind the churchyard wall and disrrupt the rebel advance. This succeeded, and Erik managed to break into the rebel forces, sword in hand. It was the first time he had personally participated in a battle and he did so bravely.

After the successes of Erik's forces, the rebel vanguard pulled back to the main rebel force, chased by Erik's entire force.

== Aftermath ==
After the successes of Erik's forces, the rebel vanguard pulled back to the main rebel force, chased by Erik's entire force. When the main rebel army saw the retreat, they followed along, retreating backwards without having to fight. The Dukes decided it was best to make a tactical retreat and reorganize their foirces north of Mälaren, and on the way, they captured Gripsholm castle.

Despite his victory, Erik did not have enough troops to combat the rebels, even if the navy and thousands of cavalrymen was still loyal to him.

According to the historian Dick Harrison, if Erik XIV had followed up his victory at Botkyrka, it is likely that he would have remained on the throne.

== Works cited ==
- Isacsson, Claes-Göran (2006). Vägen till stormakt : Vasaättens krig [The road to great power: The wars of the Vasa dynasty] (in Swedish). Norstedts. pp. 223–224. ISBN 9789113015026.
- Adolfsson, Mats (2007). Fogdemakt och bondevrede: 1500-1718 [Bailiff power and peasant rage: 1500-1718] (in Swedish). Natur & Kultur. pp. 166–167. ISBN 9789127026322.
