= Månsdotter =

Månsdotter is a Swedish patronymic ('Daughter of Måns´) that has been part of the name of

- Cecilia Månsdotter (c. 1476–1523), Swedish noblewoman
- Ebba Lilliehöök (Månsdotter, 1529–1609), Swedish noblewoman
- Karin Månsdotter (1550–1612), Queen of Sweden
  - Karin Månsdotter (film), a 1954 Swedish historical drama film
