= Uprising against Erik XIV =

Rebellion in 1568

Uprising against Eric XIV
- Part of the Northern Seven Years' War
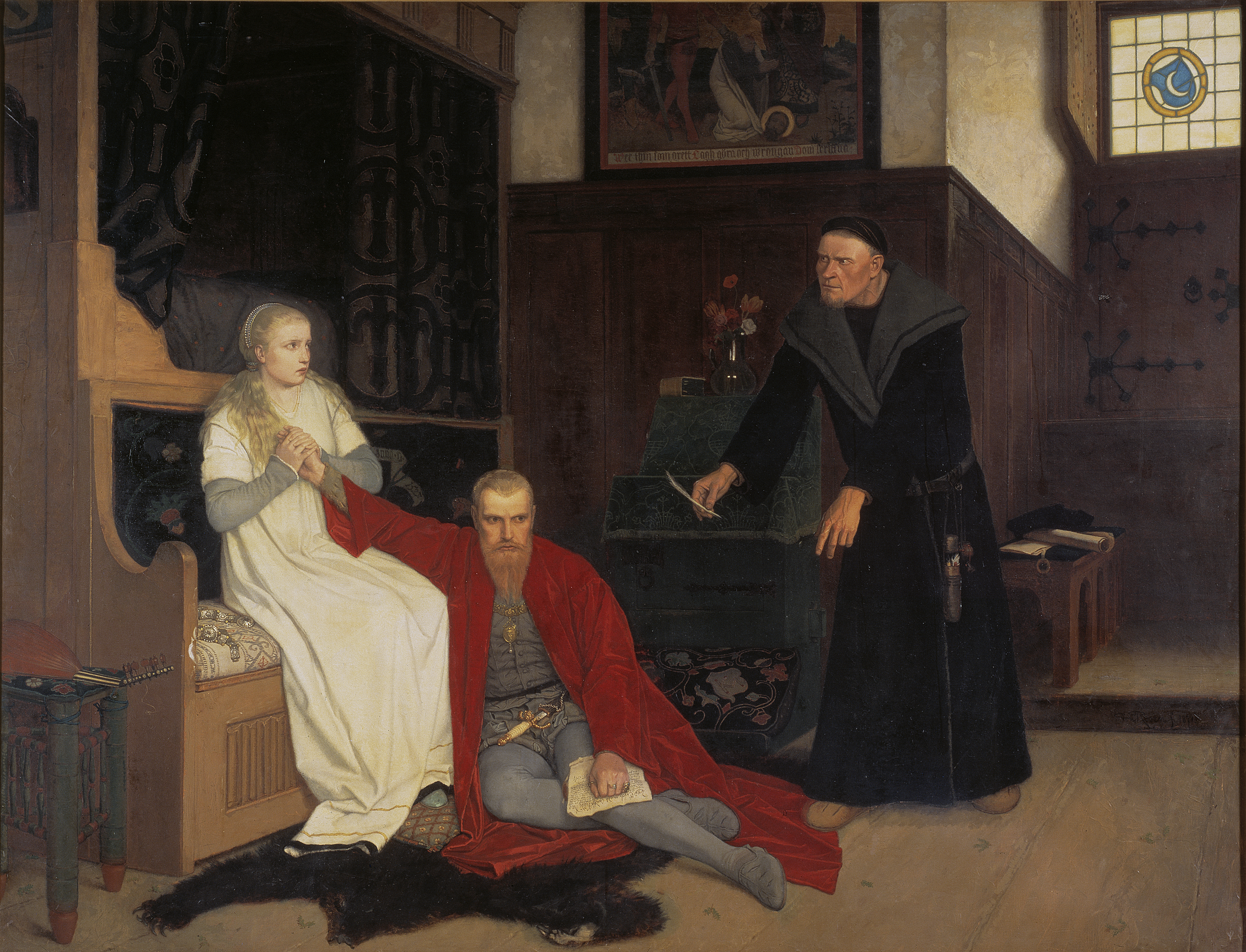
- Depiction of Erik XIV with his wife Karin Månsdotter and Jöran Persson (standing) by Georg von Rosen from 1871
Date	12 July – 28 September 1568
Location	Sweden
Result	Rebel victory
Territorial changes	Erik XIV is deposed

Government-Insurgents
Sweden	Rebels

Commanders and leaders
(History of Sweden (1523–1611)) Erik XIV (surrendered) (History of Sweden (1523–1611)) Jöran Persson (executed) (History of Sweden (1523–1611)) Per Hansson (executed) (History of Sweden (1523–1611)) Krister Persson (executed) (History of Sweden (1523–1611)) Åke Bengtsson Färla (History of Sweden (1523–1611)) Gisle Nilsson	Duke John; Duke Charles; Gustaf Banér; Pontus De la Gardie (WIA); Anders Sigfridsson (WIA); Sten Eriksson (DOW)

Units involved
(History of Sweden (1523–1611)) Stockholm garrison	Unknown

Strength
6,000 men	7,000–8,000 men

Casualties and losses
Many captured	Unknown

The Uprising against Erik XIV (Swedish: Upproret mot Erik XIV), also called the Duke's uprising (Swedish: Hertigarnas resning), was the successful uprising against the Swedish king Erik XIV in 1568 by his brothers Duke John and Duke Charles (later John III and Charles IX) that resulted in Erik's deposition.

Despite a victory at Botkyrka in 1568, Erik failed to follow his victory up, and Stockholm would capitulate on 28 September, with Erik being imprisoned and later formally deposed by the Riksdag in 1569.

== Background ==
After Erik XIV's son Gustav was born in January 1568, he became calmer, happier, and lighter as having an heir was a big concern of his. As a result of the birth, Erik became more confident of the future, and wished to crown Karin Månsdotter as Queen.

=== Wedding between Karin and Erik ===
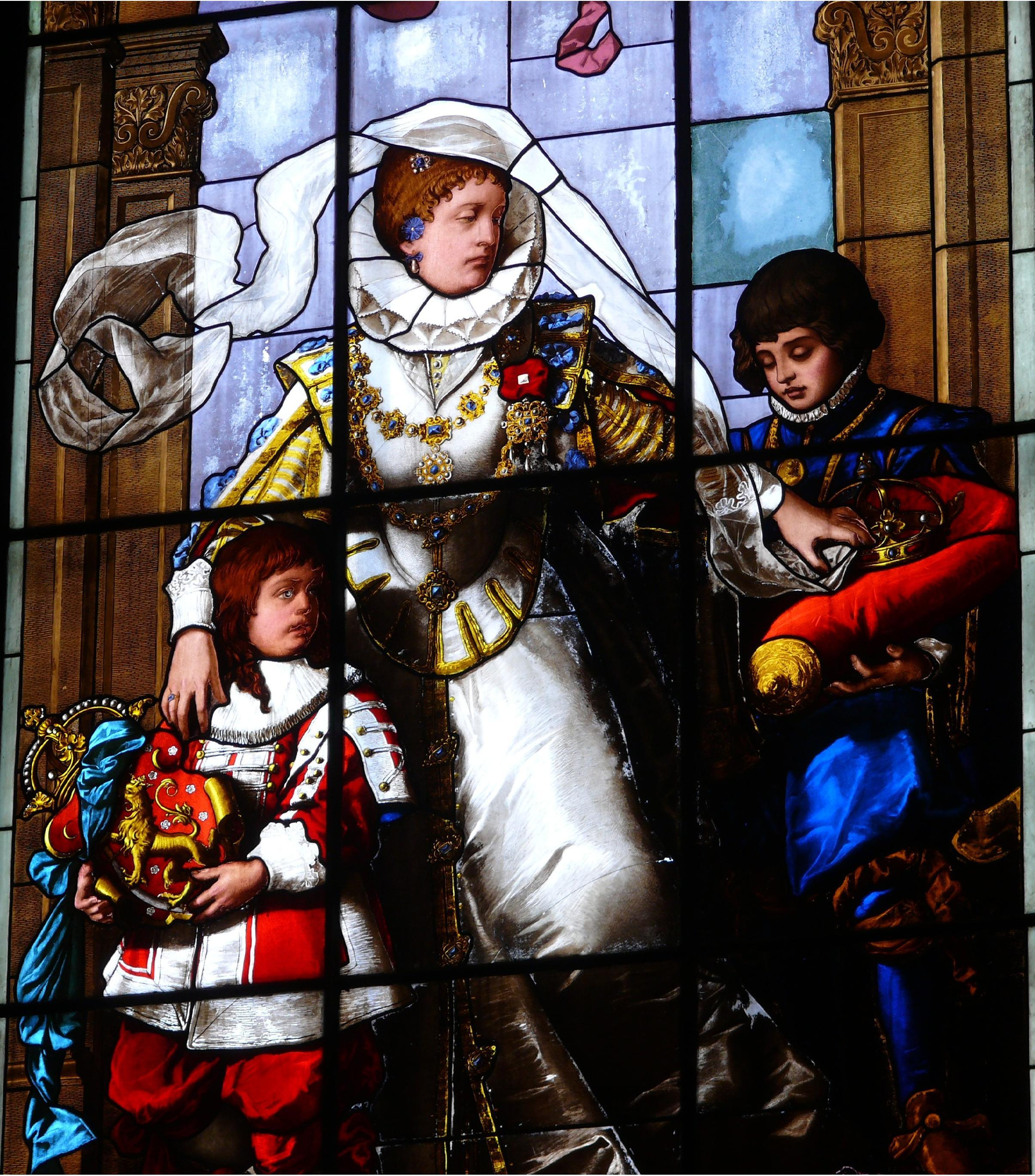
Depiction of Karin Månsdotter rejecting the crown in 1568 in a window at Turku Cathedral

A year after the secret wedding between Karin and Erik, on July 4 1568, a new ceremony was held where Karin was formally crowned as Queen of Sweden at 17. Dukes John and Charles had been invited, and despite accepting the invitations, were not present along with other guests as there were false rumours being spread that they had only been invited so that they could be executed. In comparison, Erik had good intentions, while John prepared for an uprising.

Despite Erik's good intentions, the wedding was not taken well by the high nobility in Sweden. While they could accept a secret wedding, the public and official ceremony meant that she became the Queen and that they now had to bow to her, which was unacceptable to them.

While Karin was a polite and calming person, and a likeable person, she was in the wrong place at the wrong time, and her rise to Queen was the main reason for the uprising, according to historian Erik Jöransson Tegel.

=== Conspiracy in the Nobility ===
In the Swedish nobility, they had long believed that Erik was not the right man to lead the country, the circle which preferred John was however killed at Uppsala in 1567. War exhaustion was also rampant, and the nobility despised their military duty along with other matters. Erik also had the habit of being more friendly with the other estates in the Riksdag, instead of the nobility. Along with this, John hated Erik, wishing to see him humiliated, alone, deposed, and imprisoned or dead.

Erik knew what was going on, and contacted his brothers, reminding them that they had sworn him an oath of loyalty. At the same time, he also hoped that John would be able to form an agreement with the Polish–Lithuanian Commonwealth. When no such agreement was made, he instead looked at an alternative with Russia.

== Uprising ==
Erik believed that Vadstena would be the first target for the rebels, as it was a good place to assemble troops, and he wrote to it explaining how the garrison should not let the rebels inside, but it was too late. On 12 July, John and Charles captured Vadstena turning it into their headquarters and gaining control over a large part of Östergötland along with a strong connection by sea to Västergötland. The uprising had officially began. In his almanac on 20 July, Erik writes of the so called Rebellio (rebellion). Erik's uncle, Sten Eriksson, joined the side of the rebels, and together they began marching on Stockholm where Erik had assembled the estates, declaring a proclamation that the rebels were traitors who would be defeated. Regular troops stationed in Östergötland quickly renounced their oaths to Erik and swore oaths to Duke Charles. However, Erik still had control of the entire fleet and its crew.

Erik believed that John and Charles were going to join the Danes, and met the uprising by trying to reinforce Varberg and Kalmar in order to deny John and Charles any chance of going to Frederick II. However, this was not their intention, and wished to see them defeated just like John. However, they did secure a truce with Denmark for three months in order to focus on Erik.

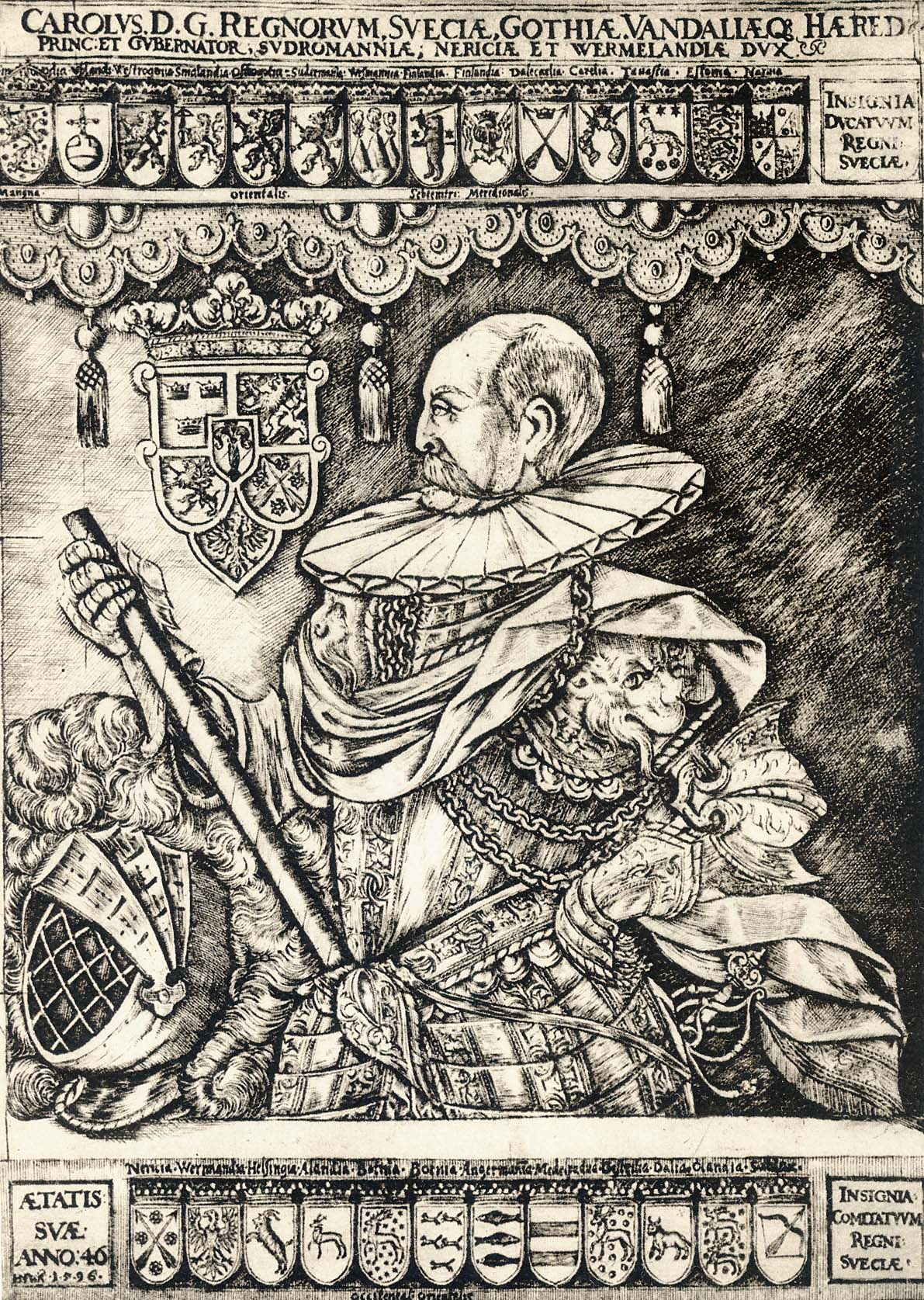
Engraving of Duke Charles in 1596 by Hieronymus Nützel

Erik had hoped that the relationship between Charles and John could be splintered, and while agreement with John was unlikely, it was different with Charles. This is because Erik had been responsible for Charles when he became king, and managed Charles' education and kept him close. After realizing Charles' involvement in the uprising, he wrote to him and reminded him of the oath he had sworn. If Charles refused, Erik wanted them to meet in a duel to solve the matter. In his response, Charles wrote that if Erik wished to meet, he just needed to come to him. Charles' response also explained that the uprising was not against Sweden, rather against Erik himself for his "unchristian government" along with giving Jöran Persson power. Instead of any agreements being signed, John and Charles continued their march to Stockholm. The rebels chose John as riksföreståndare, and by August, the rebel army is estimated to have been some 7,000–8,000 men in total.

In his response to Charles, Erik wrote:

You have seduced our poor loyal servants, those we ourselves have trained in the art of war. If we still had them and you alone, with your kin and followers, we would gladly meet you on the battlefield; but now, we are content to face you alone with equal swords, without deceit, on a fair fighting ground, so that the blood of our subjects may be spared. You, who are younger and of lower rank than we, come here to Stockholm on an appointed day, fully armored and on foot, with sword and dagger! Whichever of us is defeated shall, by the judgment of honorable men who are witnesses, be deemed to have the less just cause!

The rebel army soon conquered Stegeborg and Nyköping, and the clergy at the Diocese of Linköping hailed John as their "true lord," and the congregations throughout Västergötland slowly swore allegiance to the Duke. The Estates in Stockholm quickly made a proclamation against the rebels, with death sentences being given to the Dukes and their supporters.

By the end of July, eight banners of cavalry and 18 fähnleins of infantry, commanded by Åke Bengtsson Färla and Gisle Nilsson had promised to support Erik but were convinced to not do so by the dukes. Erik attempted an attack on Nyköping but was repulsed by Duke Charles, and he returned to Stockholm.

When the rebel army approached the Mälaren in August, they encountered Erik's troops in Hölö forest, who were quickly repulsed.

=== Battle of Botkyrka ===
In response to the rebel approach towards Stockholm and defeat at Hölö, Erik assembled his drabants and lead them out to engage the rebels head on. He led them in a similar approach to when Danish general Daniel Rantzau was expelled from Sweden, and he was far more successful this time. When Erik's forces, estimated at 6,000 men, showed up at Botkyrka on 31 August, he quickly sent his vanguard of 700 men towards the much stronger rebel force led by Pontus De la Gardie estimated at 1,190 men in total. He quickly overwhelmed it, forcing it to retreat to Södertälje. He had now won a total victory, and it was the only instance where he led troops in a regular battle and won. During their retreat, the rebels captured Gripsholm Castle.

=== Siege and capitulation of Stockholm ===
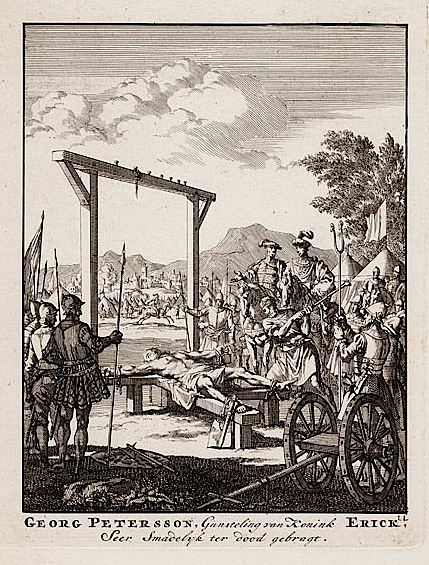
Etching of Jöran Persson's execution by Jan Luyken

After being repulsed from Botkyrka, the rebels instead went around Mälaren Valley and conquered Västerås, Örebro, and Uppsala. After this, the rebels reached the city gates of Stockholm on 17 September. In the following fighting, many people loyal to Erik betrayed him after he showed signs of defeat and fled to the rebel camp, including people like Per Brahe and Klas Fleming, along with Queen dowager Katarina. The city was shortly besieged, during which Erik tried to do a sortie, which failed. During the siege, John and Charles demanded that Jöran Persson be handed over, which was granted by Olof Larsson after Persson had been arrested. After the rebels received him, they began torturing him for information along with Erik's plans. However, Jöran refused to reveal anything and was later brutally tortured again and later decapitated on Galgbacken on 22 September on charges of negatively affecting Erik.

On 28 September, John convinced Erik to open the city gates, and on the next day troops commanded by Sten Eriksson marched into Stockholm, and there was one last battle between Erik's forces and the rebels on Stortorget, during which Eriksson was mortally wounded. Along with Eriksson, Anders Sigfridsson and Pontus De la Gardie were wounded in the back and arm respectively. During the confusion that followed, Erik managed to flee into Stockholm Castle with his forces, but quickly surrendered himself to John after a demand by Duke Charles. Following his surrender, several of his loyalists were executed, like the secretary Per Hansson, and Krister Persson.

Per Brahe also convinced the garrison of the castle to surrender, and on 29 September, Duke John marched into Stockholm with his forces.

== Aftermath ==
After surrendering, Erik was arrested in the castle and was treated well while John prepared a process for him. With support of the Riksdag, this was achieved, with Erik being sentenced to life imprisonment, and he would die in 1577 after being poisoned.

== Works cited ==
- Annerstedt, Thure (1880). Resningen 1568 [Rising of 1568] (in Swedish). Göteborgs Handestidnings Aktiebolags Tryckeri.
- Adolfsson, Mats (2007). Fogdemakt och bondevrede: 1500-1718 [Bailiff power and peasant rage: 1500-1718] (in Swedish). Natur & Kultur. ISBN 9789127026322.
- Lindbergh, Katarina (2022). Nordiska sjuårskriget [Nordic Seven Years' War] (in Swedish). Historiska Media. ISBN 9789180500951.
- Isacson, Claes-Göran (2006). Vägen till stormakt: Vasaättens krig [Road to great power: Wars of the Vasa dynasty] (in Swedish). Norstedts. ISBN 9789113015026.
- Landgrén, Lars-Folke (2008). Tvekampen 1521-1611 [The Duel 1521-1611]. Krigen kring Östersjön (in Swedish). Helsinki: Schildts. ISBN 9789515018212.
- Larsson, Lars Olof (2005). Arvet efter Gustav Vasa: en berättelse om fyra kungar och ett rike [The Legacy of Gustav Vasa: A Story of Four Kings and a Kingdom] (in Swedish). Prisma. ISBN 9789151842035.
- Isacsson, Alexander (2021). "Dynastisk centralisering i 1560-talets Sverige: "Reservens dilemma" och hertigarnas resning 1568" [Dynastic centralization in 1560s Sweden: "Reserven's dilemma" and the rise of the dukes in 1568]. journals.lub.lu.se (in Swedish). 87 (1). Örebro University: 11–37. doi:10.47868/scandia.v87i1.23251.
- Henriksson, Alf (1963). Svensk historia [Swedish history] (in Swedish). Vol. 1. Albert Bonniers. ISBN 91-0-056167-3.
