= Sigrid of Sweden =

Sigrid of Sweden, also Sigrith, may refer to:

- Sigrid the Haughty, Swedish queen consort (questionable), 10th century
- Sigrid, Swedish princess about 1188, daughter of King Canute I
- Sigrid, Princess of Sweden 1567
