= Andersdotter =

Swedish surname

Andersdotter is a surname. Notable people with the surname include:

- Amelia Andersdotter (born 1987), Swedish politician
- Anna Andersdotter (floruit 1598), Swedish noble
- Elin Andersdotter (died 1569), Swedish courtier
- Magdalena Andersdotter (1590–1650), Norwegian shipowner
