= Johanna de Herboville =

Jeanne d'Herboville, née de Beaudrengien, in Sweden known as Johanna de Herboville (flourit 1596), was a French Huguenot noblewoman and a Swedish courtier. She emigrated to Sweden with her husband, and served as the governess of the children of King Eric XIV of Sweden.

== Life ==
Johanna de Herboville was married to French nobleman Jean d'Herboville. The couple were both Huguenot protestants. In 1558, they emigrated to Protestant Sweden.

Her husband was given a position at the Swedish Royal Court of Gustav I as a teacher of that king's youngest son, Duke Charles. Gustav I died in 1560 and was succeeded by his eldest son, Eric XIV, who then appointed Johanna de Herboville (wife of a man by then established at the Swedish court) as governess for King Eric's and Queen Karin Månsdotter's children: Sigrid of Sweden and Gustav of Sweden. As such she was given the responsibility of the household of the royal children and the lesser staff of the royal nursery. She was the only person allowed to withdraw funds from the queen's money, except the queen herself and the queen's personal secretary.

After the desposition and imprisonment of Eric XIV in 1568, the royal children initially remained in the custody of Johanna de Herboville, separated from their imprisoned parents. She, in turn, was placed under the supervision of the queen dowager, Catherine Stenbock. The children remained under de Herboville's care for two years. In 1570 it was decided that the children should join their parents in their imprisonment.

Johanna de Herboville was still alive in 1596, which is the last year she is known to be mentioned.
