= Gustav of Sweden (1568–1607) =

Heir apparent to Erik XIV

- Born: 28 January 1568; Nyköping, Kingdom of Sweden
- Died: 22 February 1607 (aged 39); Kashin, Tsardom of Russia
Names
- Gustav Eriksson Vasa
- House: Vasa
- Father: Erik XIV of Sweden
- Mother: Karin Månsdotter
- Religion: Roman Catholic

Gustav Eriksson (28 January 1568 – February 1607), son of King Erik XIV and Karin Månsdotter, was born as heir to the Swedish throne but lost his status when his father was deposed in September 1568. After spending his early years in captivity with his family, he was sent to Poland in 1575, where he was raised and became Catholic. He spent time in various parts of Europe, including Poland, Prussia, and possibly Italy. His uncle, King John III of Sweden, viewed him as a possible pretender to the throne and refused to allow his return to Sweden.

Gustav developed an interest in alchemy, which gained him the favor of Emperor Rudolf II. In 1599, Tsar Boris Godunov invited him to Moscow for a proposed marriage to his daughter Xenia, but when Gustav refused to be part of the political schemes, he was imprisoned. After Boris was overthrown in 1605, Gustav was released, but he was later imprisoned again by the False Dmitry and sent to Yaroslavl. After the False Dmitry’s death, Gustav was sent to live in Kashin, where he died in 1607.

== Early life ==
Gustav Eriksson was born in 28 January 1568 in Nyköping to King Erik XIV and Karin Månsdotter, who had been secretly married by Archbishop Laurentius Petri the previous summer. A public marriage ceremony was held in Stockholm Cathedral on 4 July 1568. During the ceremony, King Erik carried his son in his arms, with his daughter Sigrid (born in 1566) following behind her parents. The children's presence was an unprecedented breach of etiquette, designed to demonstrate their status: both of them were officially recognized as legitimate, and Gustav, named after his grandfather Gustav Vasa, was confirmed as the heir to the throne. The ceremonies continued the next day with Karin Månsdotter's coronation as Queen of Sweden.

The king's brothers, dukes John and Charles, did not attend the ceremonies, which led Erik to place them under house arrest. This was the final provocation that led the dukes and nobles to rebel against Erik XIV. After some resistance, John seized power on 30 September, and was hailed as King John III, while Erik and his family were imprisoned. Gustav, Sigrid and their parents were initially held in Stockholm, remaining in the care of their governess Johanna de Herboville, then moved to Turku (Åbo) Castle in July 1570, later to Kastelholm, and then to Gripsholm in the autumn of 1571.

Erik was separated from his family in June 1573 when Karin and her children were moved to Turku, and he never saw them after that. He died in 1577.

== Poland and travels ==
In spring 1575, the seven-year-old Gustav was taken from his mother and sent to Poland. King John III considered Gustav a threat to his reign, as he could be used as a pretender to the throne by his opponents. Gustav was placed with the family of Laurentius Rilski, a loyal servant to Queen Catherine Jagiellon, where he received a Polish upbringing. Gustav became a Catholic, learned Polish, and almost completely forgot the Swedish language.

Gustav escaped the Rilski family in 1578 and survived for a time by begging and doing odd jobs. By the early 1580s, he enrolled in the Jesuit seminar in Braunsberg (Braniewo) and later transferred to another seminar in Vilnius. He kept his true identity hidden during his stay in the seminary. In 1583, Gustav is recorded to have stayed with the Zaporozhian Cossacks along the Dnieper River, and seems to have left his studies by that time. By 1585, he is found in the Polish court, under the protection of Queen Anne.

Gustav was in Kraków during King Sigismund III coronation in December 1587 and managed to meet his sister Sigrid, who was there as a lady-in-waiting to their cousin, Princess Anna. Sigrid helped him deliver a letter to Sigismund, requesting that Sigismund appeal to his father, King John III, to revoke Gustav's exile. However, John refused. Later, Gustav wrote further appeals to John III, but to no avail. Around this time, he also wrote to Felipe II of Spain and asked for a permission to settle in Spain.

In 1588, Gustav Eriksson stayed in Prague at the court of Emperor Rudolf II, with whom he shared an interest in alchemy. In early 1590s, Gustav lived in Prussia, where he received income from lands granted to him by the pope at the request of King Sigismund. He may have also spent some time in Italy, studying in the University of Padua where he is said to have received instruction from Galileo Galilei. Having learned Gustav Eriksson's identity, the catholic circles of Central Europe made plans to elevate him to the Swedish throne, or alternatively, to appoint him as the Catholic Archbishop of Uppsala. However, based on his letters, Gustav himself showed no interest on such plans, but would have been content with a stable income and a peaceful life.

In 1596, Gustav was invited to Finland by his mother, Karin, but the Finnish governor, Klas Fleming, did not permit him to enter. Instead, Gustav and Karin met at Reval (Tallinn), where she gave him some of Erik XIV's diaries. Afterwards, Gustav settled in Thorn.

== Russia ==
In 1599, Tsar Boris Godunov invited Gustav to Moscow for a proposed marriage to his daughter Xenia. Gustav was received with great celebrations, but it soon became clear that the tsar intended to use him in political plans against Sweden. Gustav refused the marriage and the political schemes, and was thrown in prison.

Gustav was released after Boris Godunov was overthrown in 1605. As compensation, the now-homeless Gustav received the principality of Uglich, where he lived until the beginning of the reign of the False Dmitry. At the request of his ally, Sigismund III, the False Dmitry ordered Gustav's arrest and sent him to a prison in Yaroslavl. After the False Dmitry's death, the new tsar Vasili IV released Gustav and sent him to live in the small city of Kashin, Russia.

Gustav Eriksson Vasa died in February 1607 in Kashin and was buried there 22 February.

== Legacy ==
In older history writing, Gustav was thought to have had four children with a certain Brita Karth and perhaps even have married her. This has however been refuted by modern historians.

Gustav is the main character of the famous Polish novel "Gwiazda spadająca" by Jadwiga Żylińska.
