= Anna Andersdotter =

Swedish nobleman

Anna Andersdotter (died after 1598) was a Swedish noblewoman who was married to Jöran Persson, the adviser of King Eric XIV of Sweden.

Anna Andersdotter married Jöran Persson in 1561. She was described as a personal friend and companion of Karin Månsdotter and was listed in her entourage during trips between different royal castles, both during Karin's tenure as royal mistress and as queen.

During the first illness of Eric XIV in 1567, Jöran Persson was deposed from his position and arrested. During the process against him, Anna was accused of having planted the rumor that Karin had used witchcraft to make the king fall in love with her, thereby causing him to become insane by the magic. Anna was further more herself accused of having used witchcraft to enchant Karin. Reportedly, she was sentenced guilty as charged, but for unknown reasons, she sentence was never carried out. Tradition has it that it was commuted upon the request of Karin Månsdotter, but this is regarded as one of the many myths created around Karin. In any case, soon after this, the king recovered his senses, and Jöran Persson was reinstated in his position as adviser to the king.

In 1563, she became the caretaker of the illegitimate children of the king's brother Duke John when he was imprisoned, Julius and Sofia Gyllenhielm. In 1568, Eric XIV was deposed and imprisoned and his brother John took power. Jöran Persson was once again deposed, imprisoned and this time executed. His mother, Anna, was also arrested and sentenced to death and would have been executed had she not died before the execution. Anna Andersdotter and her three children were given refuge and protection against persecution by the king's brother, Duke Charles.

Anna Andersdotter's date of death was not recorded, but she was last mentioned alive in 1598, thirty years after the fall of Jöran Persson.
