= Jöran Persson =

Swedish politician

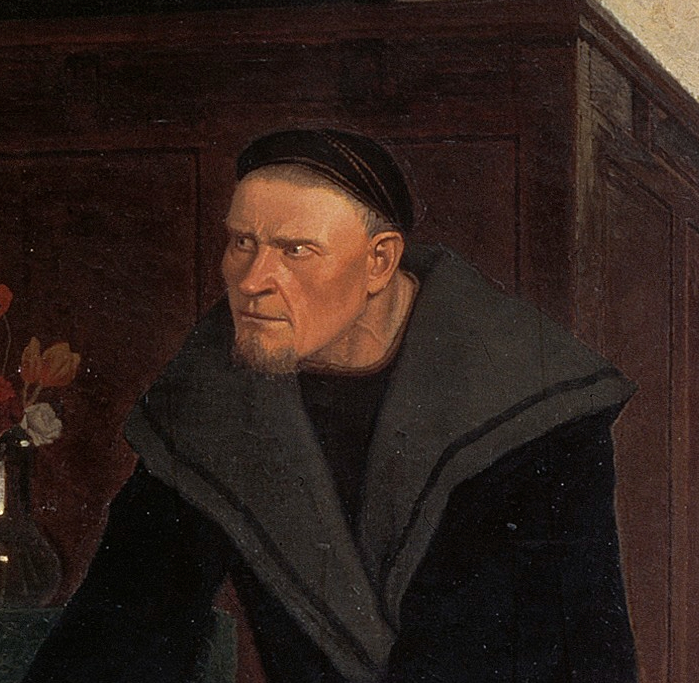
Jöran Persson, 1871 painting by Georg von Rosen

Jöran Persson, alternatively Göran Persson (c. 1530 – September 1568), was King Eric XIV of Sweden's favorite, most trusted counsellor and head of the King's network of spies. He was widely seen as a Machiavellian figure, and as holding too much influence over Eric. On both occasions on which the King was removed from power, Persson was quickly arrested by the nobility; the second time he was executed shortly after his arrest.

== Life ==
Jöran Persson was born in Sala, the son of a local priest, Curatus Petrus (Per Joensson) and Anna Pehrsönernas moder, in about 1530. He had a brother, Christiern Persson.

=== Early career ===
During the early 1550s he studied at the University of Wittenberg, where he proved to be a very gifted student and, according to legend, was highly regarded by the eminent theologian Philipp Melanchthon, who, on his journey back to Sweden in 1555, sent with him a recommendation letter to King Gustav I. Upon his return to Sweden he was given an annual pension and employment in the King's service, a year later he became personal secretary to the King and was given a castle in Vyborg. In 1558 he received another important commission from the king, namely being put in charge of the King's inspectors in Västergötland in order to establish a register of the estates, which, to the detriment of the Crown, remained loyal to Rome. To be entrusted with such an important matter showed that Jöran Persson, even at this early stage in his career, had made himself known in prominent circles as a man capable of getting difficult tasks done. Following the completion of his mission in Västergötland, Gustav allowed Jöran Persson to become personal secretary to his eldest son, Eric.

Jöran Persson had established a reputation for possessing a quick mind and a sharp wit, and of being ambitious, bold, and ruthless. It is also known that Jöran Persson was very familiar with astrology, which he believed to guide the lives of men to a certain extent; despite having been raised and educated in the Protestant tradition, he appears to have been an agnostic.

=== Enthronement of Eric ===
Following Erik's accession to the throne in 1560, Jöran Persson was raised into the nobility. He took a coat of arms bearing a design of three bricks, the family name Tegel and became the lord of Trögds härad. He was married in 1561 to a woman named Anna Andersdotter. The couple had two children: the renowned historian Erik Jöransson Tegel and his brother Anders Jöransson Tegel who married Brita Månsdotter Hand.

Jöran Persson played an important role in the Konungens nämnd (literally: King's committee, the highest court in Sweden), where he served simultaneously as a prosecutor and the King's representative. This meant that, as well as prosecuting, he also had some control over sentencing. It is not known how many of the 300 death sentences handed down by the court while he was part of it he was personally involved with, however he was regarded by many as the nation's foremost executioner (it is still a point of contention whether he took orders from the King in such matters, or whether he acted on his own initiative). Jöran soon became very unpopular among the public, as did his brother, Christiern Persson (d.1567), who also held a position at court. Among other things they were, chiefly among the public, thought to be under the "evil influence" of their mother Anna, who was widely believed to be a witch who influenced politics through the use of sorcery.

=== Imprisonment of John ===
Jöran Persson would go to great length to protect the King's power, the most famous example of this occurred in the summer of 1563 when he ruthlessly crushed the formative rebellion of the King's half-brother, Duke John of Finland. He ordered that John be imprisoned in his home, Turku Castle, along with his followers and that they were to be executed. However, instead of being executed, the Duke was shortly afterwards taken to Vaxholm to meet with Jöran Persson. As the representative of the King, he decided that they should instead be detained in the much closer Gripsholm Castle, so a watchful eye could be kept on the Duke and his wife at all times. Jöran Persson also personally saw to it that the couple's detention was harsh, far more so than the King had ordered.

=== Sture Murders ===
Shortly after the imprisonment of Duke John, the Northern Seven Years' War began between Sweden and a coalition of Denmark–Norway, Lübeck and the Polish–Lithuanian Commonwealth. The war, which was particularly bloody, went well for Sweden at sea, but went very badly on land. The war became increasingly unpopular as Swedish towns were damaged and destroyed, and casualties mounted. As the aristocracy's frustration with Eric's reign became increasingly apparent, the King and Jöran Persson feared a new rebellion.

Eric, who at this stage was beginning to show signs of mental illness, decided to take action to prevent a rebellion and he invited those he suspected of plotting against him to Svartsjö Castle in May 1567. Those suspected of being a threat to the King were arrested upon their arrival at the castle and they were tried in Uppsala with Jöran Persson leading the prosecutions. All those tried were, unsurprisingly, found guilty and sentenced to death. The last nobleman to arrive at Svartsjö was Nils Svantesson Sture, the grandson of regent Sten Sture the Younger, who had only just returned from a diplomatic mission to Lorraine. The King had long regarded Sture as the most dangerous nobleman in Sweden; in 1566 he had ordered Sture's execution but ultimately decided against this and publicly humiliated him instead. Sture was arrested on 22 May, the following day Eric murdered him in his cell. Following the murder, Jöran Persson managed to convince a council of the nobility, who were unaware of Sture's murder, that those who had been arrested were traitors and that the death penalty was therefore justified; the assent of the nobility meant that the murder and the executions were legal.

The murder of Nils Sture, however, had a huge effect on Eric's health. Within weeks he was removed from the throne on grounds of insanity. The regents elected to rule in place of Eric decided to release John from prison, and decided to arrest Jöran Persson for ordering the deaths of the prisoners in Uppsala; it had become apparent by this stage that those executed were not traitors, but victims of the King's increasing paranoia.

=== Later career ===
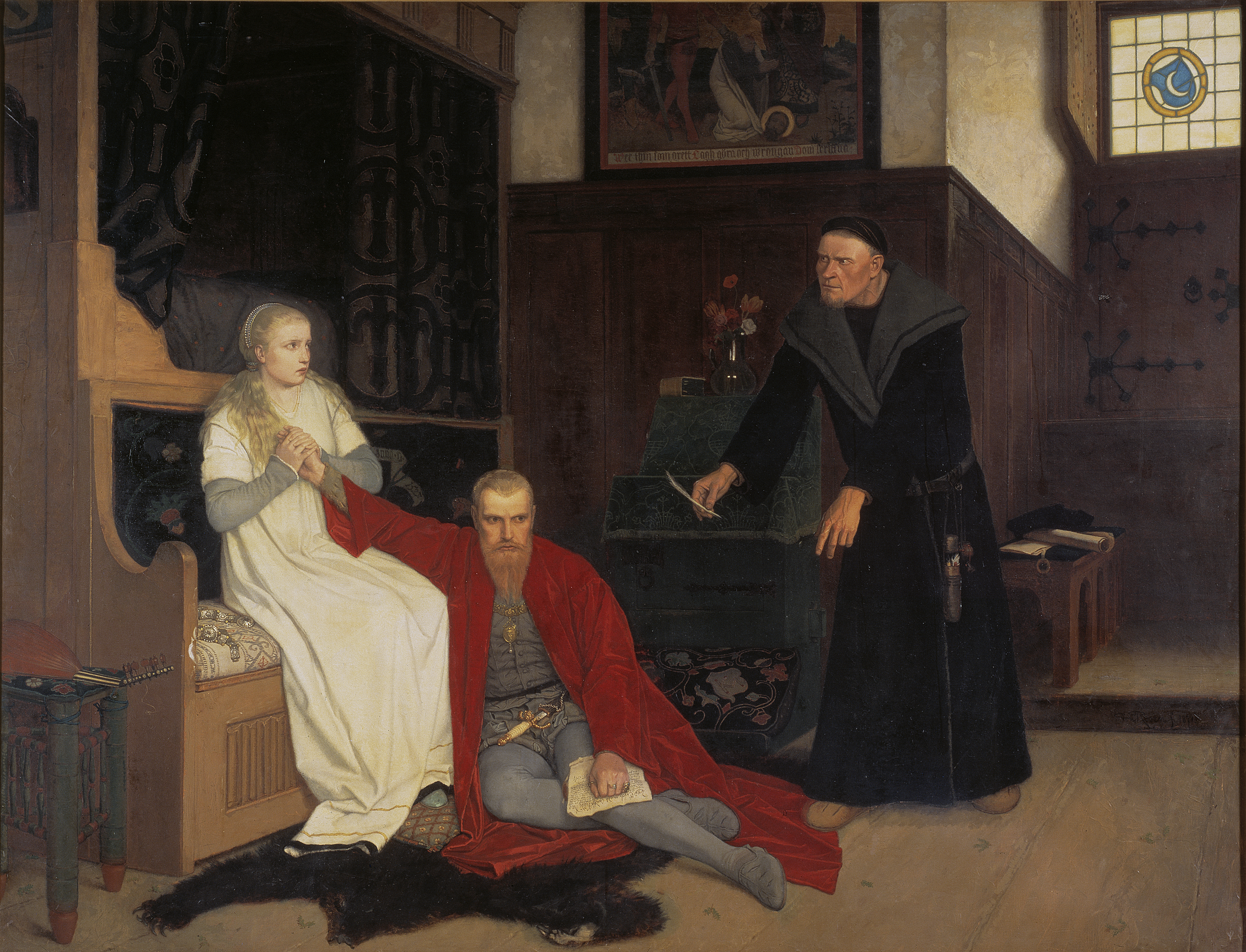
"Erik XIV and Karin Månsdotter" (Jöran Persson standing), by Georg von Rosen (1871)

The King recovered from his illness later in the year and was allowed to retake his throne; his first act following this was to release Jöran Persson. He did not, however, send his brother back to prison; on the contrary he reconciled with him. John used the first pretext he could find, Eric's marriage to the commoner Karin Månsdotter, to lead a rebellion against his brother. Almost the entirety of the nobility, desiring revenge for Eric's treatment of them, rallied behind John. This rebellion, somewhat conveniently, resulted in the King once again showing signs of insanity.

=== Death ===
In September 1568, Eric was forced to abdicate and was succeeded by his brother, who took the title John III. Following this, Jöran Persson was once again arrested. John, who had never forgiven Jöran Persson for his treatment whilst imprisoned in Gripsholm, ordered his death following a very hasty trial, which found him guilty of a number of crimes involving his role in suppressing the nobility. Jöran Persson died very slowly; he was sentenced to the breaking wheel and severely tortured before being beheaded at some point between 18 September and 21 September 1568. His mother was ordered to be executed with him, but threw herself off the horse on the way to the execution and died.
