= Karin Månsdotter (film) =

1954 film

- Directed by: Alf Sjöberg
- Screenplay by: Alf Sjöberg
- Based on: Erik XIV by August Strindberg
- Produced by: Rune Waldekranz
- Starring: Ulla Jacobsson
- Cinematography: Sven Nykvist
- Edited by: Eric Nordemar
- Music by: Lille Bror Söderlundh
- Release date: 1 November 1954
- Running time: 108 minutes
- Country: Sweden
- Language: Swedish

Karin Månsdotter is a 1954 Swedish historical drama film directed by Alf Sjöberg. It is based on the 1899 play Erik XIV by August Strindberg.

== Plot ==
Karin Mansdotter is the daughter of an ordinary soldier. Still King Erik of Sweden falls madly in love with her. This turn of fate is appreciated by his adviser Göran Persson because he lives in constant fear the nobles could find a way to increase their influence on the king. When Erik's plan to marry English princess Elizabeth Tudor fails, Persson condones Erik's decision to make Karin his Queen. The Swedish nobility resents this wedding. The isolated King eventually shows signs of distress which are used against him. In the end he is dethroned and replaced by his brother while Persson gets decapitated for treason.

== Cast ==
- Ulla Jacobsson as Karin Månsdotter
- Jarl Kulle as King Erik of Sweden
- Ulf Palme as Göran Persson
- Olof Widgren as Castle vicar
- Stig Järrel as Olof Gustafsson Stenbock
- Erik Strandmark as Welam Welamsson
- Bengt Blomgren as Max
- Kurt-Olof Sundström as Hertig Johan
- Åke Claesson as Svante Sture
- Per Oscarsson as Anders
- Birgitta Valberg as Queen Dowager
- Ulla Sjöblom as Agda
- Aurore Palmgren as Göran Persson's mother (as Aurora Palmgren)
