= Örbyhus Castle =

Castle in Tierp Municipality, Sweden

- Tierp Municipality, Sweden
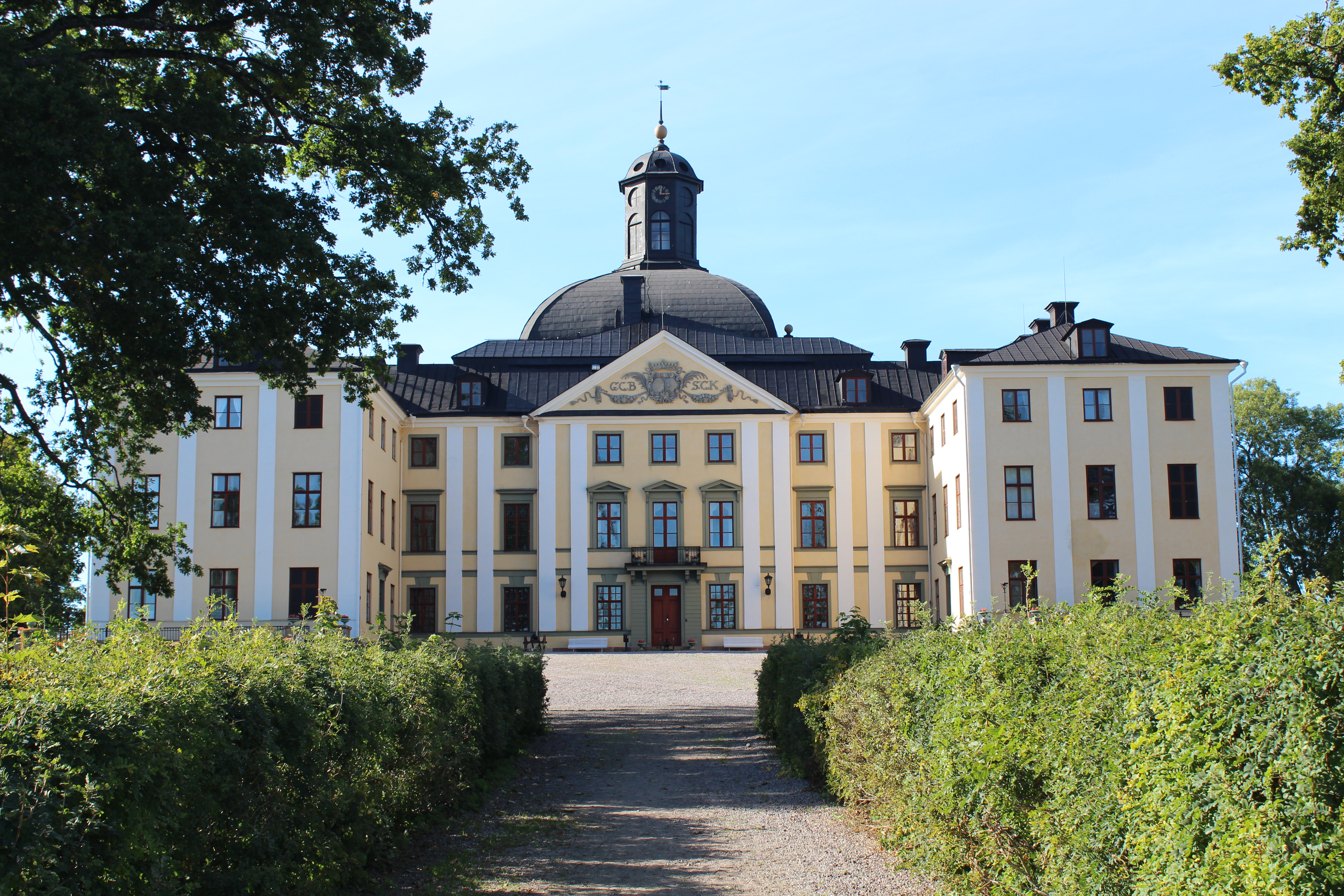

Site information
- Type: Castle
- Owner: Private
- Open to the public: Yes, guided tours

Location
- Coordinates: 60°12′00″N 17°42′33″E

Site history
- Built by: Johan Kristensson Vasa

Örbyhus Castle (Swedish: Örbyhus slott) is a castle in Tierp Municipality, Sweden. It lies some 12 kilometres east of European route E4, approximately halfway between Uppsala and Gävle.

Known since the 14th century, the estate was turned into a castle during the 15th century by Johan Kristensson Vasa, grandfather of Swedish king Gustav Vasa. The castle has been used as a prison, and its most well-known prisoner was king Eric XIV of Sweden, who died here in 1577.

== History ==
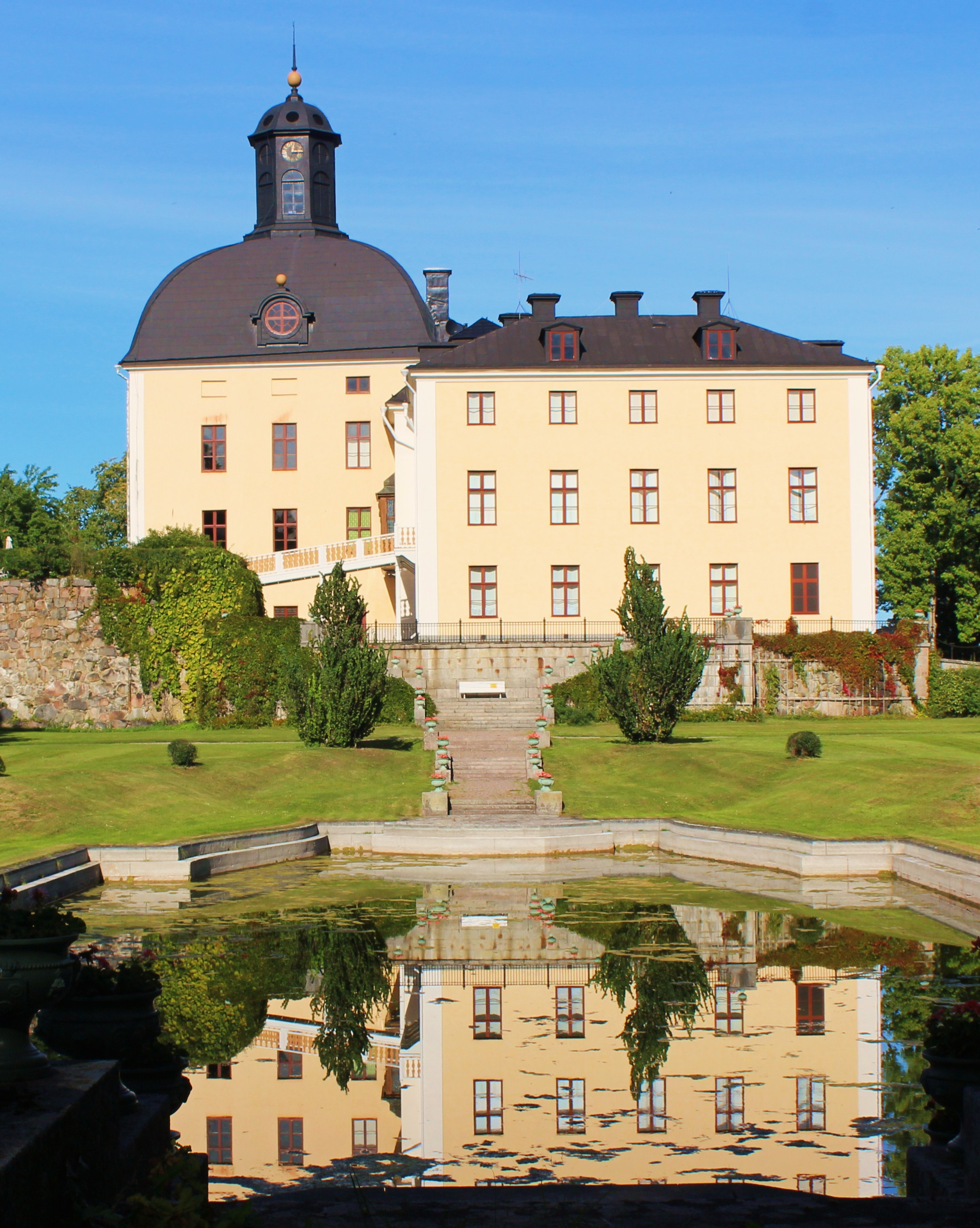
Side view of the castle, with the incorporated medieval keep to the left

The estate is known since the 14th century. During the 15th century, a stone keep was erected for defensive purposes by Johan Kristensson Vasa, grandfather of future king of Sweden Gustav Vasa. The stone tower still forms the core of the castle complex. This central tower was built at the middle of the 15th century. It subsequently stayed in the Vasa family, and during the reign of Gustav Vasa was expanded into a fortress with a surrounding wall, still partially preserved. From this time, the castle also began to be used as a state prison, where for example the field marshal, Privy Council member and governor of Narva and Ivangorod Carl Henriksson Horn af Kanckas sat imprisoned after being condemned for treason. The most famous prisoner of the castle is king Eric XIV of Sweden, who was imprisoned by his brother, John III of Sweden. Eric XIV was imprisoned in 1574 and died in captivity there in 1577. He was quite possibly murdered at the instigation of his brother.

The castle stayed within the royal family until 1641, when it through an exchange became the property of the Banér family, who remained owners until 1729. During the ownership of Gustaf Carlsson Banér, the castle was in the 1660s transformed into a Baroque palace. The architect, possibly Erik Dahlbergh, incorporated the medieval keep in the palace. Another large-scale reconstruction took place in 1825–32, under the guidance of architect Carl Christoffer Gjörwell. It was renovated in 1901–08.

== Architecture ==
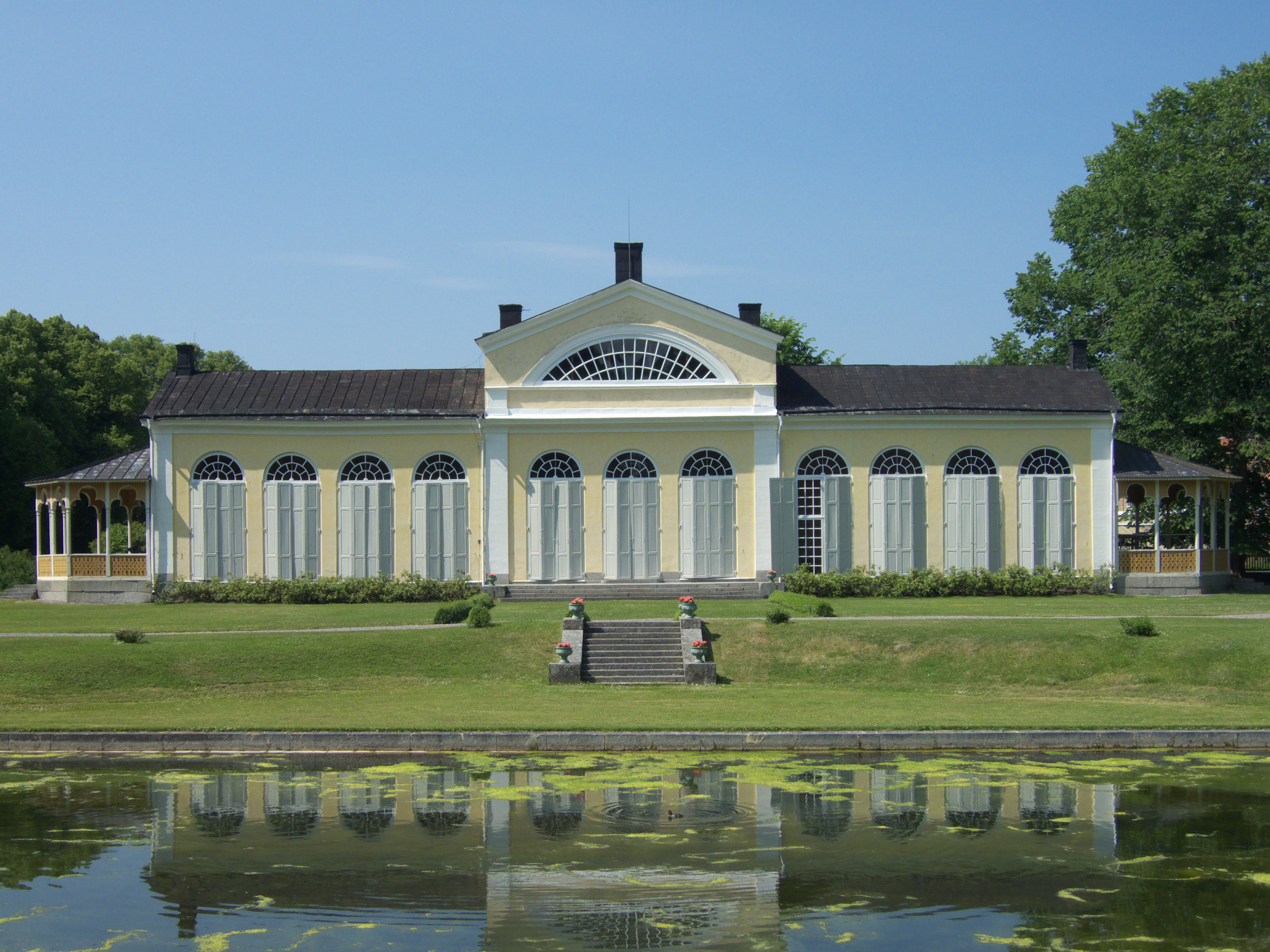
The orangery in the park

The medieval keep today forms one part of the castle complex. It is a square tower with a roof lantern, surrounded by a partially preserved stone wall with openings for cannon. It was in this tower that the prison was located. Its present furnishings, however, date from the 1640s. The tower was incorporated into the Baroque edifice when this was built in the 1660s. The Baroque part of the castle is a three-storey building built of brick. From the main building with the entrance, two wings project to form between them a courtyard. The wings were originally one storey lower but enlarged in 1825–32. Inside, the castle displays rich interiors from several centuries.

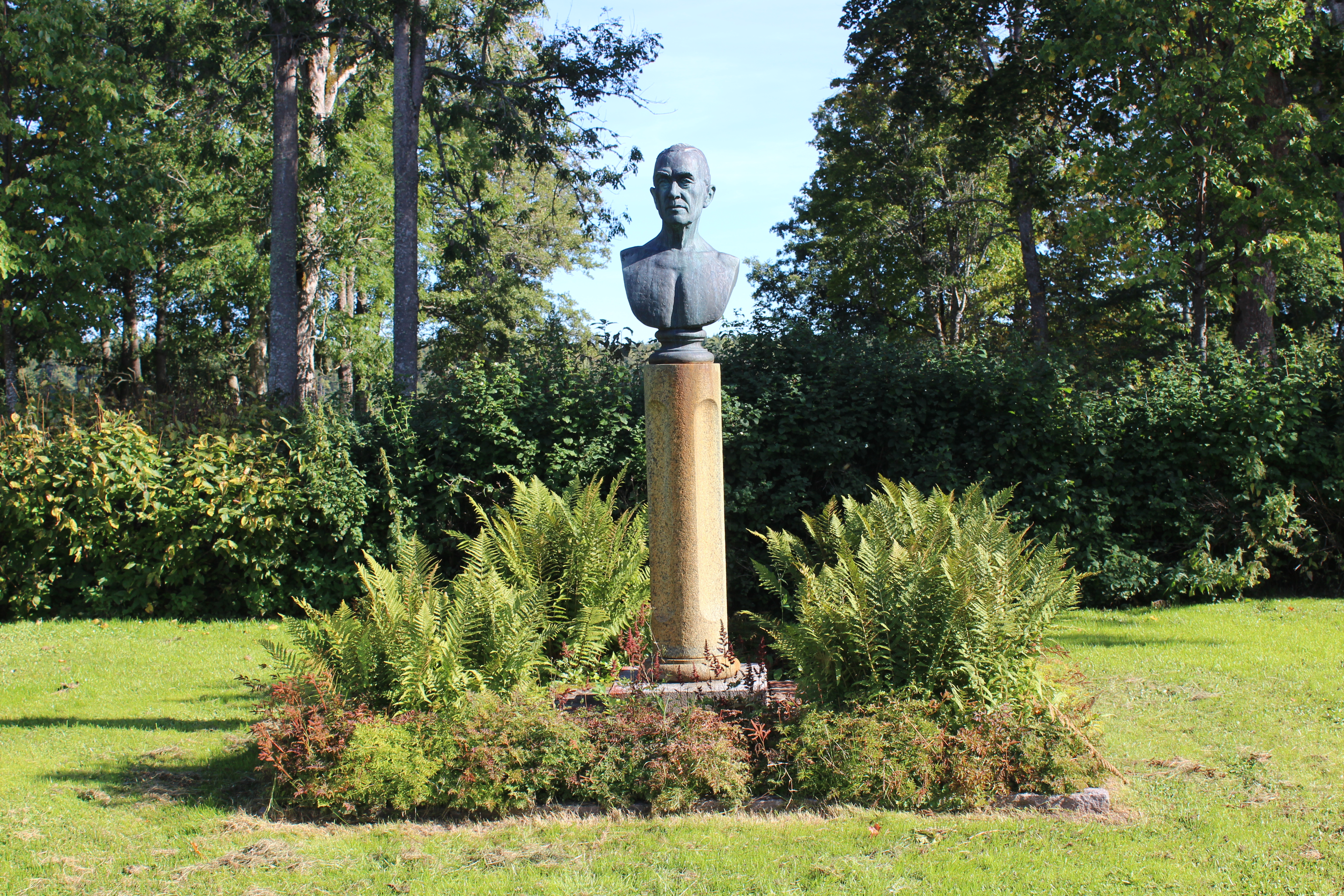
Eugène von Rosen's bust in Örbyhus castle park

Apart from the main building, the castle is surrounded by a large park and several annexes. Most notable among these is the orangery, designed by Gjörwell and erected in the 1820s.

== See also ==
- List of castles in Sweden
