= Domenicus Verwilt =

Flemish painter

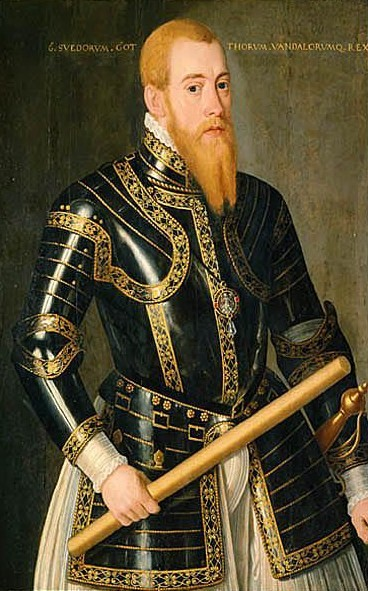
Eric XIV of Sweden by Domenicus Verwilt, ca. 1560

Domenicus Verwilt (sometimes ver Wilt) was a Flemish painter active in Sweden.

== Biography ==
According to the RKD he is known for portraits and historical allegories. Though his birth and death dates are uncertain, he is registered working in Antwerp from 1544 to 1555 and in Sweden between 1556 and 1566, where he became court painter to Eric XIV of Sweden. He probably knew the portrait painter Steven van der Meulen from his period in Antwerp, who also visited the court of Eric XIV and made a painting of him in 1561.

== See also ==
- Flemish painting
