= Sigrid of Sweden (1566–1633) =

Swedish princess

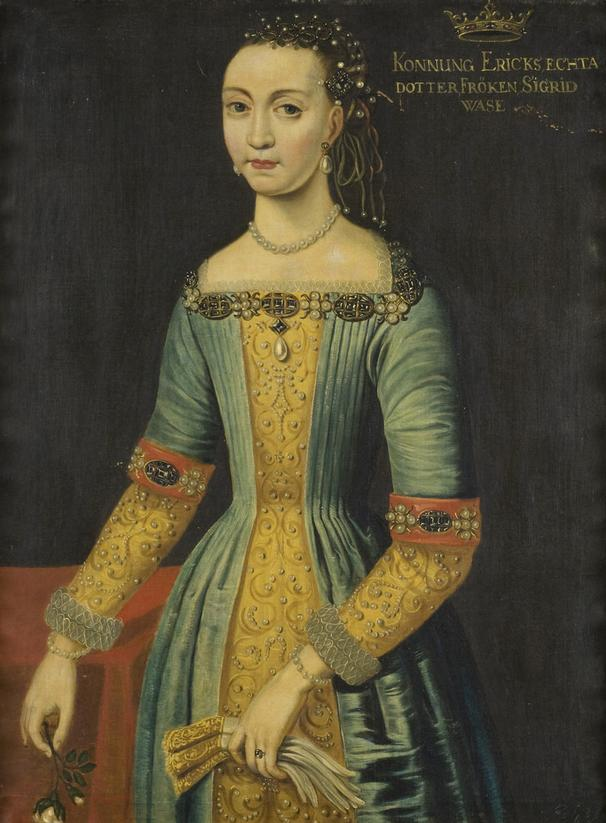
- Born: 15 October 1566; Svartsjö Castle, Färingsö, Sweden
- Died: 1633 (aged 66–67); Liuksiala Manor, Kangasala, Finland under Swedish rule
- Spouse: Henrik Klasson Tott; Nils Nilsson
- Issue: Åke Henriksson Tott; Anna Henriksdotter Tott; Erik Henriksson Tott
Names
- Sigrid Eriksdotter Vasa
- House: Vasa
- Father: Eric XIV of Sweden
- Mother: Karin Månsdotter

Sigrid Eriksdotter of Sweden (15 October 1566 – 1633) was a Swedish princess, the legitimized daughter of King Eric XIV of Sweden and of his lover, later spouse and queen, Karin Månsdotter.

== Biography ==
Sigrid was born in Svartsjö Castle, Färingsö, to King Eric and Karin Månsdotter before their marriage, but was from the beginning treated as if she was legitimate. She was taken care of by Johanna de Herboville, a French noble Huguenot immigrant.

Eric XIV married Karin morganatically in 1567, and officially in 1568, when she was ennobled and crowned queen under the name Katarina Magnusdotter. Sigrid was present at her mother's wedding and at her coronation, together with her brother Gustav. The wedding was unique; never before had the children of the couple been present at a royal wedding. The presence of the children was a way to demonstrate their new status: both of them were officially confirmed as legitimate, and Sigrid and her brother were given all the privileges of a royal princess and prince.

In 1568, her father was deposed, and his family, including Sigrid was imprisoned with him. Sigrid was periodically allowed to live outside of the house arrest of her parents, in the care of Herboville and queen dowager Catherine Stenbock. She was removed from her father in 1573 and taken to Turku castle in Finland with her mother. In 1575, she was separated from her brother, who was removed from her mother's custody. In 1577, her father died, and Sigrid and her mother were freed and allowed to settle in Liuksiala Manor in Finland.

=== Later life ===
Her position after the deposition of her father was somewhat unclear, but she did not have the full position of a royal princess: in the painting attributed to her, she is called : "Fröken Sigrid Vasa, Konung Eriks äkta dotter" (in English: "Miss Sigrid Vasa, legitimate daughter of King Eric") not "Princess". The title of "Miss" was only used by noblewomen until the 19th century. Nevertheless, she had a good relationship with her paternal family. She was made lady-in-waiting to her cousin Princess Anna of Sweden in 1582, and traveled with her to Poland, where she was present at the coronation of King Sigismund III Vasa in 1587. Soon after this, she met with her brother Gustav again in Poland. No other meeting between the siblings after this is mentioned.

In 1587, Sigrid was granted the fief of her mother's residence Liuksiala Manor in Kangasala, as well as the right to inherit it. It is unclear whether this meant that Liuksiala was now the property of Sigrid rather than Karin, but Sigrid was after this given her own income from the estate. Sigrid had a close relationship with her mother, and often visited her in Finland. It is unclear how long Sigrid remained at the court of Anna, but in 1596, she was again living in Finland, and at her wedding in 1597, she was given permission from Anna to marry, indicating that she was still formally a lady-in-waiting at that time.

In 1599, Sigrid followed her spouse in exile to Riga, where he fled from Charles IX as a known loyalist of king Sigismund. She returned to Finland as a widow in 1603. After her second marriage in 1609, Sigrid lived at the Swedish court, where her husband had a position. It is confirmed that she occasionally had conflicts with Charles IX regarding financial matters, and that the king at such occasions called her a "bastard", but there is nothing to indicate that she was in any way disregarded at court.

== Family ==
Sigrid married two Swedish noblemen. In 1597, she married Henrik Klasson Tott (died 1603).

Children with Henrik Klasson Tott

- Åke Henriksson Tott (1598–1640)
- Anna Henriksdotter Tott, died as a child
- Erik Henriksson Tott (died 1621)

On 10 September 1609, she married the county chief and royal council judge Nils Nilsson. Their wedding was held at Tre Kronor Castle in Stockholm.
