= Georg von Rosen =

Swedish painter (1843–1923)

Count Georg von Rosen
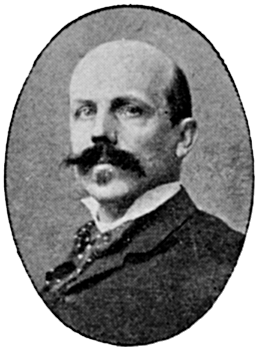
- Georg von Rosen; from the Svenskt Porträttgalleri XX
- Born: 13 February 1843; Paris, France
- Died: 3 March 1923 (aged 80); Stockholm, Sweden
- Resting place: Galärvarvskyrkogården; 59.3281°N 18.0939°E
- Education: Royal Swedish Academy of Fine Arts

Johan Georg Otto von Rosen (13 February 1843 – 3 March 1923) was a Swedish painter and greve (count). He specialized in history paintings and portraits, done in the Academic style.

== Biography ==
He was born in Paris. When he was barely five, his family returned to Sweden as a result of the French Revolution of 1848. His father was the Consul General, Adolf Eugène von Rosen (1797–1886) who worked for public and state authorities with Swedish railway construction.

From 1855 to 1861, he studied at the Royal Swedish Academy of Fine Arts. After graduating, he visited London to see the 1862 International Exhibition, where he was influenced by the paintings on Medieval and Renaissance subjects created by Hendrik Leys. He later remarked that when he left London he was "300 years older". The following year, he spent some time at Leys' studio in Antwerp.

Inspired by that experience, upon returning home he painted an historical scene of Sten Sture the Elder entering Stockholm. Despite its obvious debt to Leys, it was praised by King Oscar II and given a "Royal Medal". Shortly after, he set out on a tour of the Mediterranean; visiting Egypt, Palestine, Syria and Greece and returning through Hungary. In 1866 he visited Rome, then went to Antwerp, where he lived with Leys until his death in 1869. This was followed by studies with artist Karl von Piloty in Munich.

Following his return to Sweden, in 1872 he became a member of the Swedish Royal Academy. He was promoted to Vice-Professor in 1874 and became a full Professor in 1880; retaining that position until 1908. He also served two terms as the Academy's Director; 1881–1887 and 1893–1899. During his first term, he came into conflict with a group of dissident students known as the Opponents (Opponenterna).

From 1892 to 1900, he was chairman of the animal rights organization Djurens Rätt, which was opposed to experimentation on animals. He was the recipient of numerous honors, including the Order of the Polar Star (1891) and the Order of Vasa (1897). In 1915, he received several honors associated with the war effort: the Order of Isabella the Catholic, the Order of the Medjidie, the Order of the Dannebrog, the Order of Leopold and the French Legion of Honor.

He was buried at the Galärvarvskyrkogården in Stockholm. His works may be seen at the Nationalmuseum, Uppsala University Library and the Göteborgs konstmuseum.

== Selected paintings ==
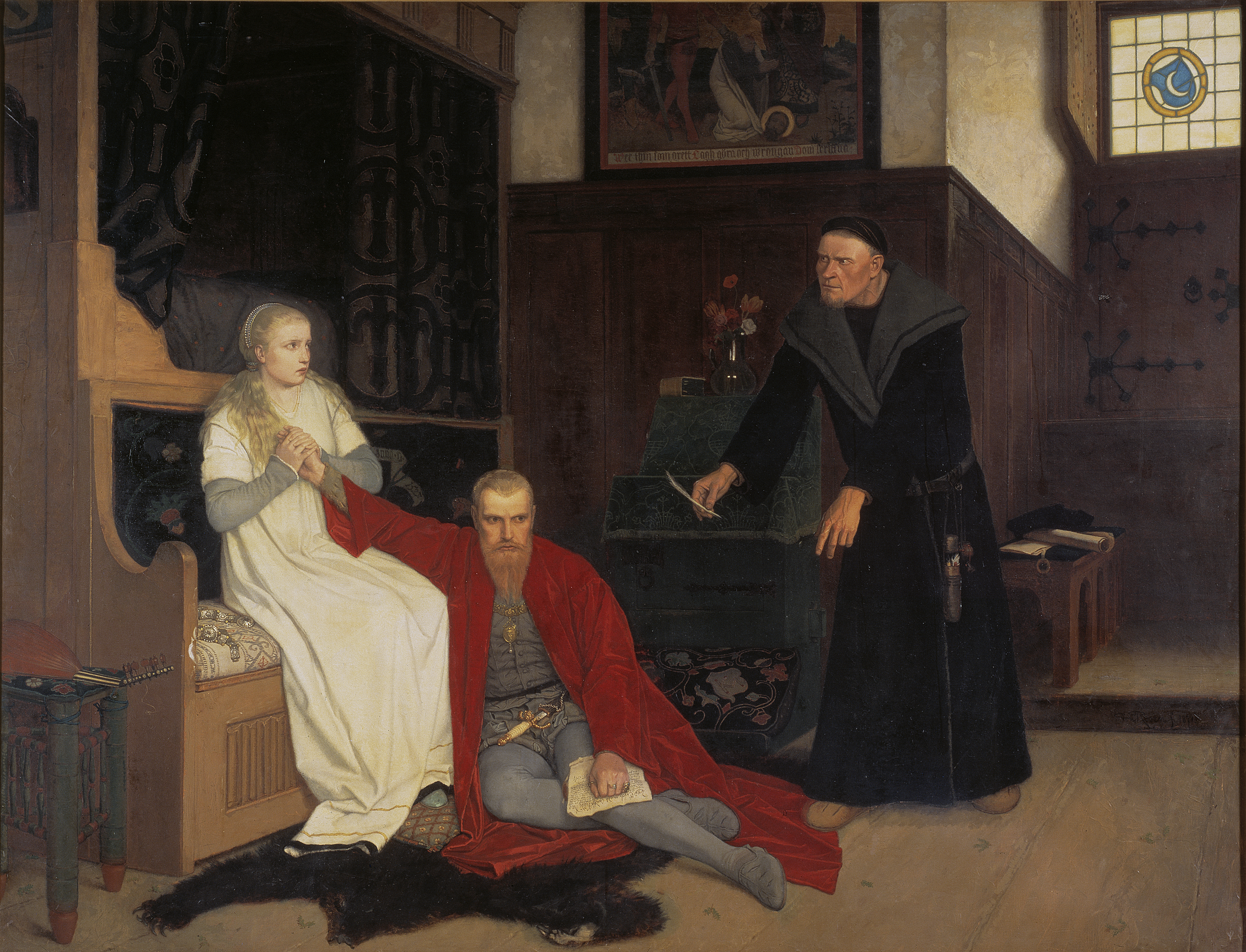
Erik XIV and Karin Månsdotter

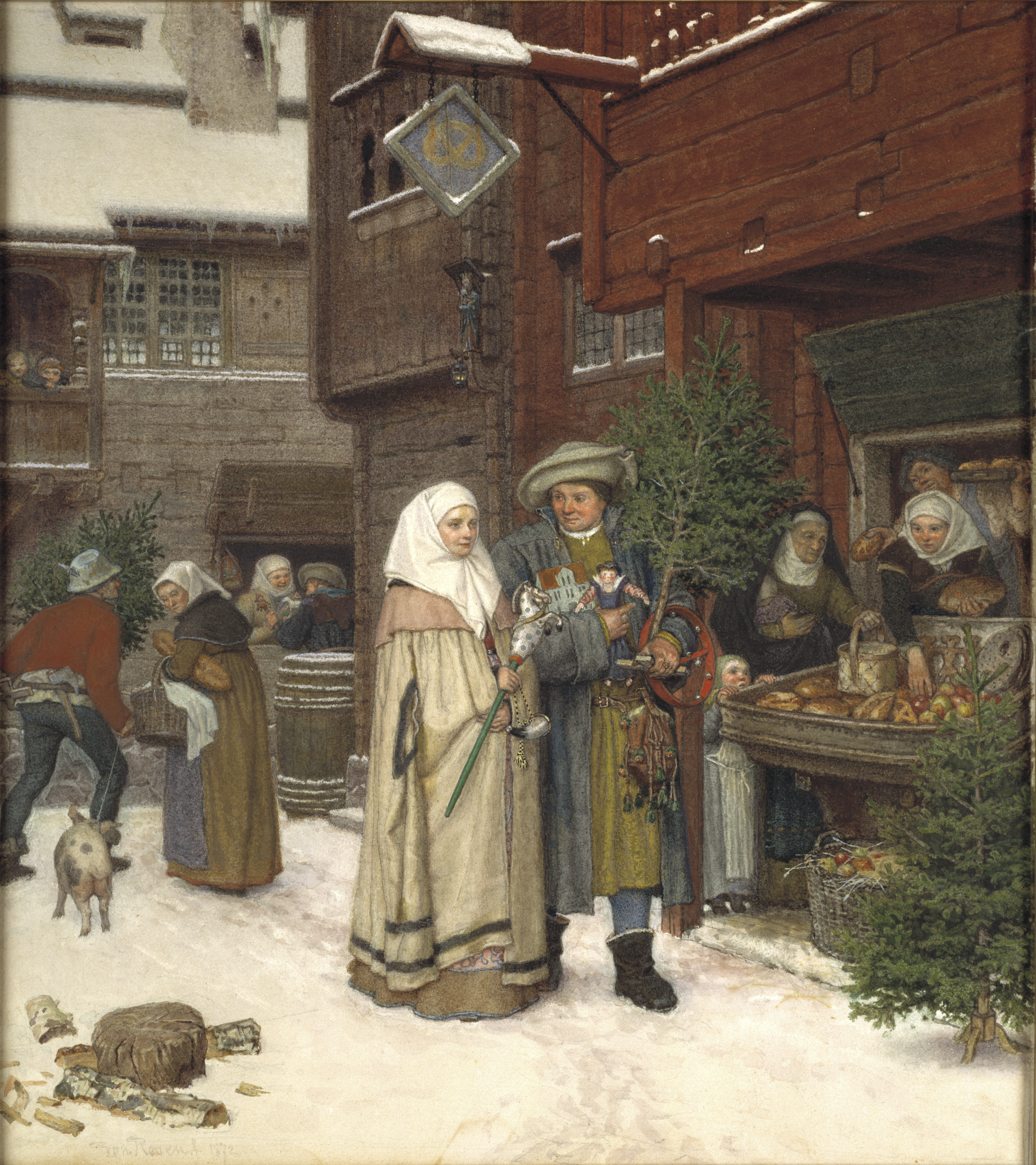
The Christmas Fair

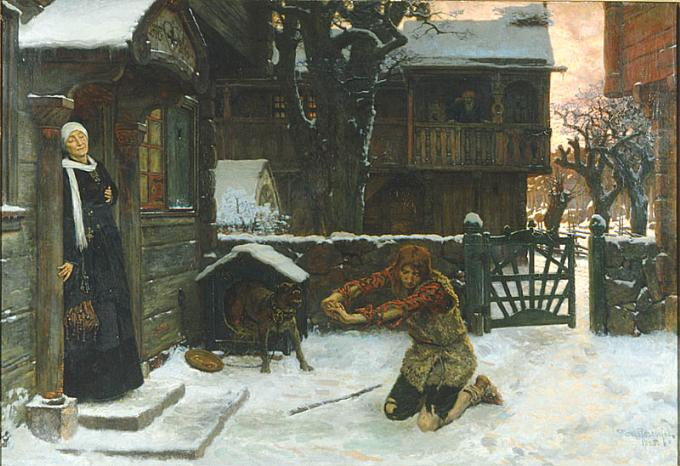
The Lost Son

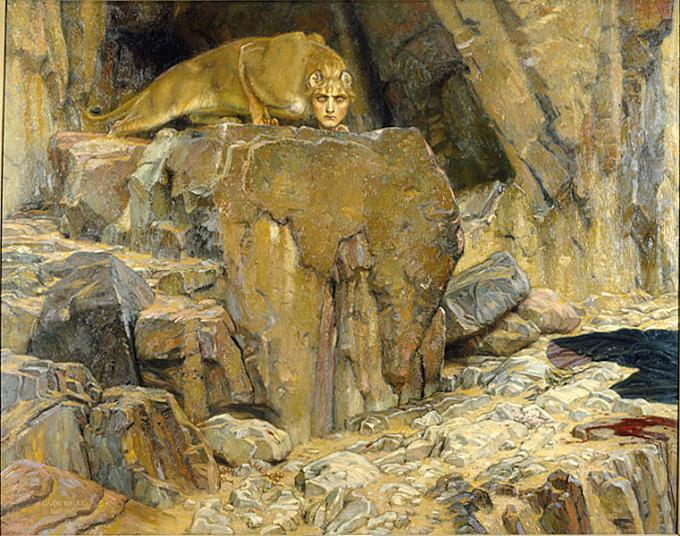
The Sphinx
