= Karin Månsdotter =

Queen of Sweden from 1568 to 1569

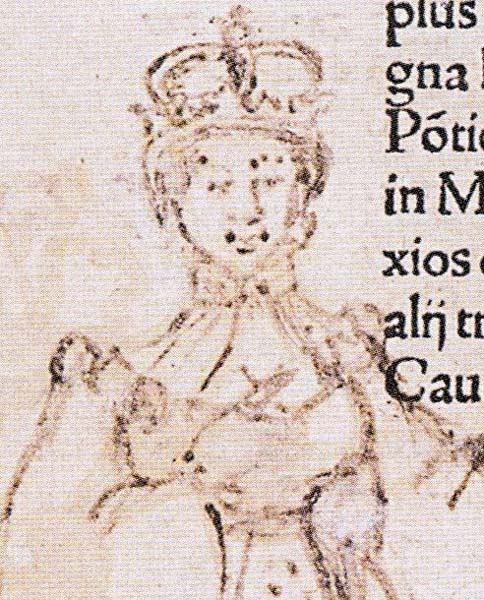
- Karin Månsdotter as drawn by her husband in prison

Queen consort of Sweden
- Tenure: 4 July 1568 – January 1569
- Born: 6 November 1550; Stockholm, Uppland, Sweden
- Died: 13 September 1612 (aged 61); Kangasala, Finland
- Burial: Turku Cathedral, Turku, Finland
- Spouse: Erik XIV
- Issue: 4, including Sigrid Eriksdotter Vasa; Gustav Eriksson Vasa
- Father: Måns
- Mother: Ingrid

Karin Månsdotter (in English Catherine; 6 November 1550 – 13 September 1612) was first the mistress and then the queen consort of King Erik XIV of Sweden.

== Early life ==
Karin was born in Stockholm to a soldier and later prison guard named Måns (her surname is a patronym, literally "daughter of Måns") and his wife Ingrid. Her mother came from a family of peasants in Uppland, and was said to have sold vegetables on the square. Both her parents are believed to have died c. 1560. According to legend, Erik XIV first noticed her selling nuts at a square in Stockholm, and was so astonished by her beauty that he took her to court as his lover, a story mentioned by Dorothea Ostrelska In reality, however, Karin Månsdotter was in 1564 employed as a servant to Karin, wife of the king's trusted court musician Gert Cantor, who held a tavern and a guest house in his home, and likely served their guests as a waitress. She was a maid to the king's sister, Princess Elizabeth, when she became mistress to the king in 1565.

== Royal mistress ==
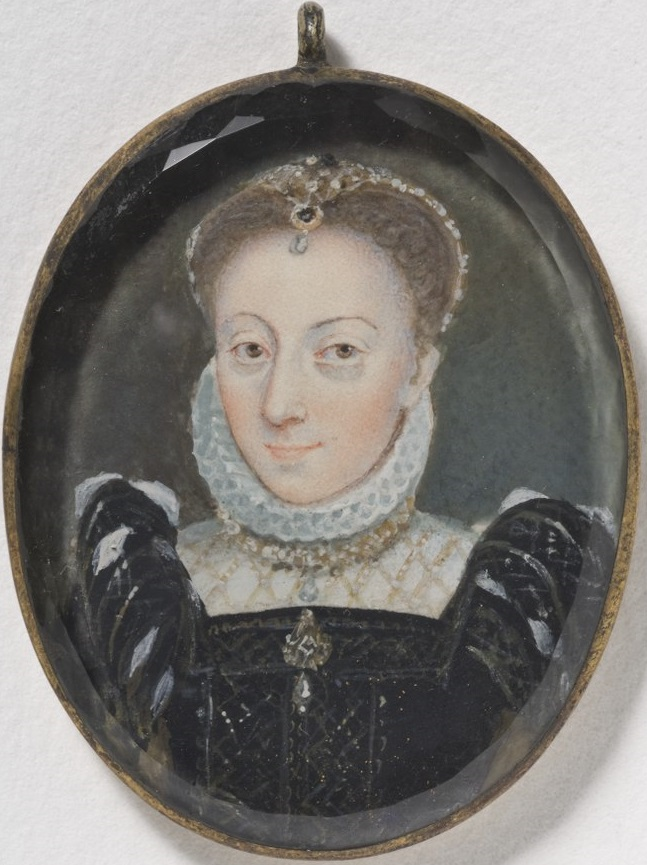
Karin Månsdotter as portrayed by Erik Utterhielm in the late 17th century

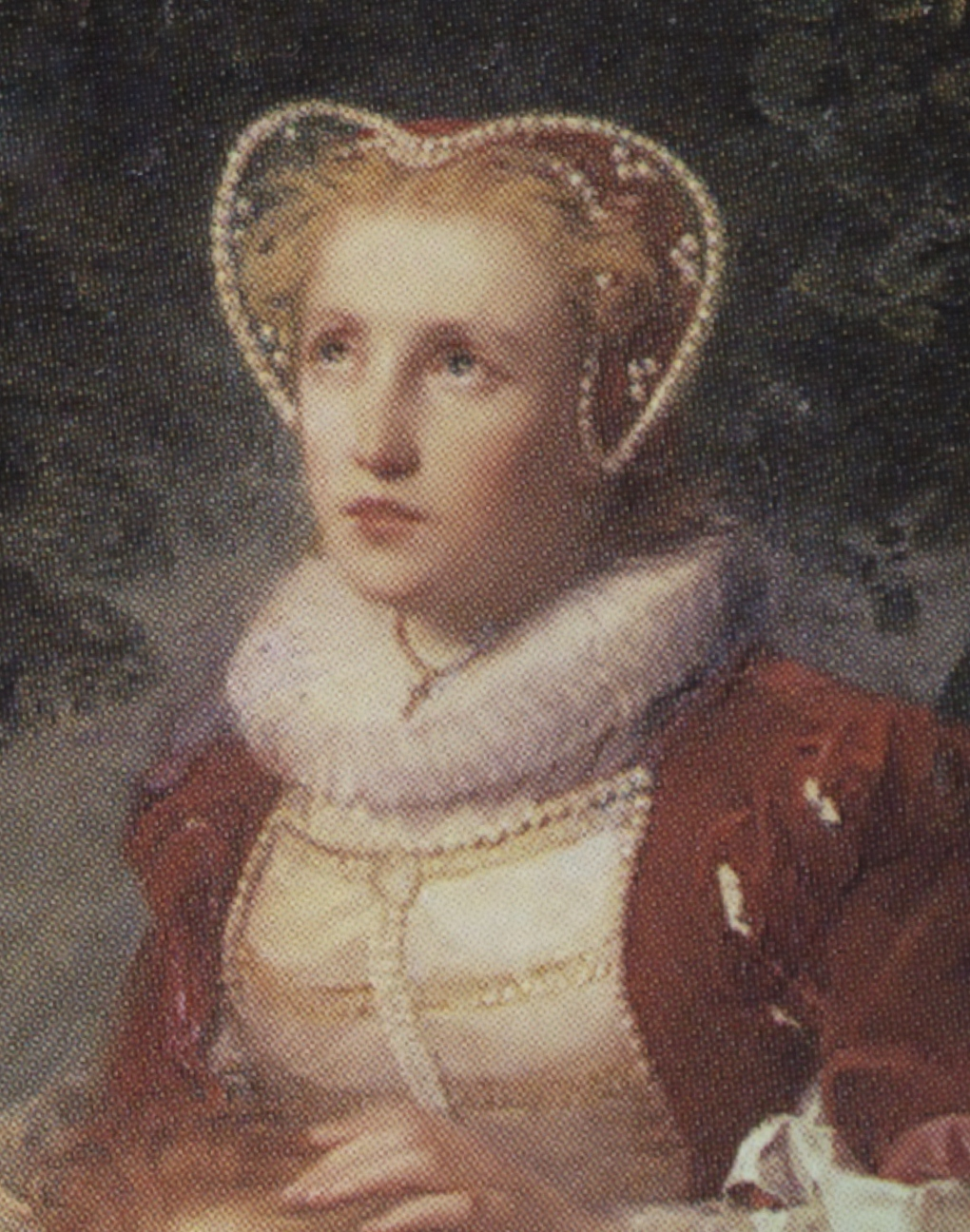
Karin as Erik Johan Löfgren imagined her in 1864

Karin seems to have entered into a relationship with Erik in the spring of 1565. The position seems to have been quite official, as she was given expensive clothes and appeared with him openly at court, and was given her own apartment and servants. In the summer of 1565, she belonged to the king's retinue to Skara, where she was provided for from the bailiff's provision for the warfaring army, which was otherwise reserved for the army, and illustrates her new status. The royal accounts states that she was given a new and expensive wardrobe and her own staff, among them her own former employer: Karin, the wife of Gert Cantor. When her daughter Sigrid was born in 1566, she was treated as a legitimate princess. Before this the king had several mistresses in parallel, such as Agda Persdotter and Doredi Valentinsdotter, but when Karin entered his life, he dismissed them all. She also received education and learned to read and write. His treatment of her caused much astonishment. The ideas of the time suggested witchcraft and love potions to explain the deep attachment.

Karin is reported to have had a fiancé before she met Erik, an ensign named Maximilian. After she became royal mistress, he managed to get into the palace, where he was discovered by Carl the manservant and taken to the king, who had him killed. According to chronicler Daniel Hund, he was in fact trapped by Erik, who had asked Karin to send for him. The truth of the story is unknown.

Karin Månsdotter's portrait was done only in her husband's scribbled drawings in captivity and in a latter-day bust at her grave (a portrait long believed to be of her has been discovered to be of her sister-in-law). She was described as very beautiful with long blond hair and innocent eyes, and her personality seems to have been calm, humble and natural. The king was mentally unstable, and she seems to have been the only one who could comfort him and calm him down, which made her appreciated by his relatives, who considered her good for him. She had no personal enemies at court, but she was not respected, and their marriage in 1568 was considered a scandal and may have contributed to his dethronement.

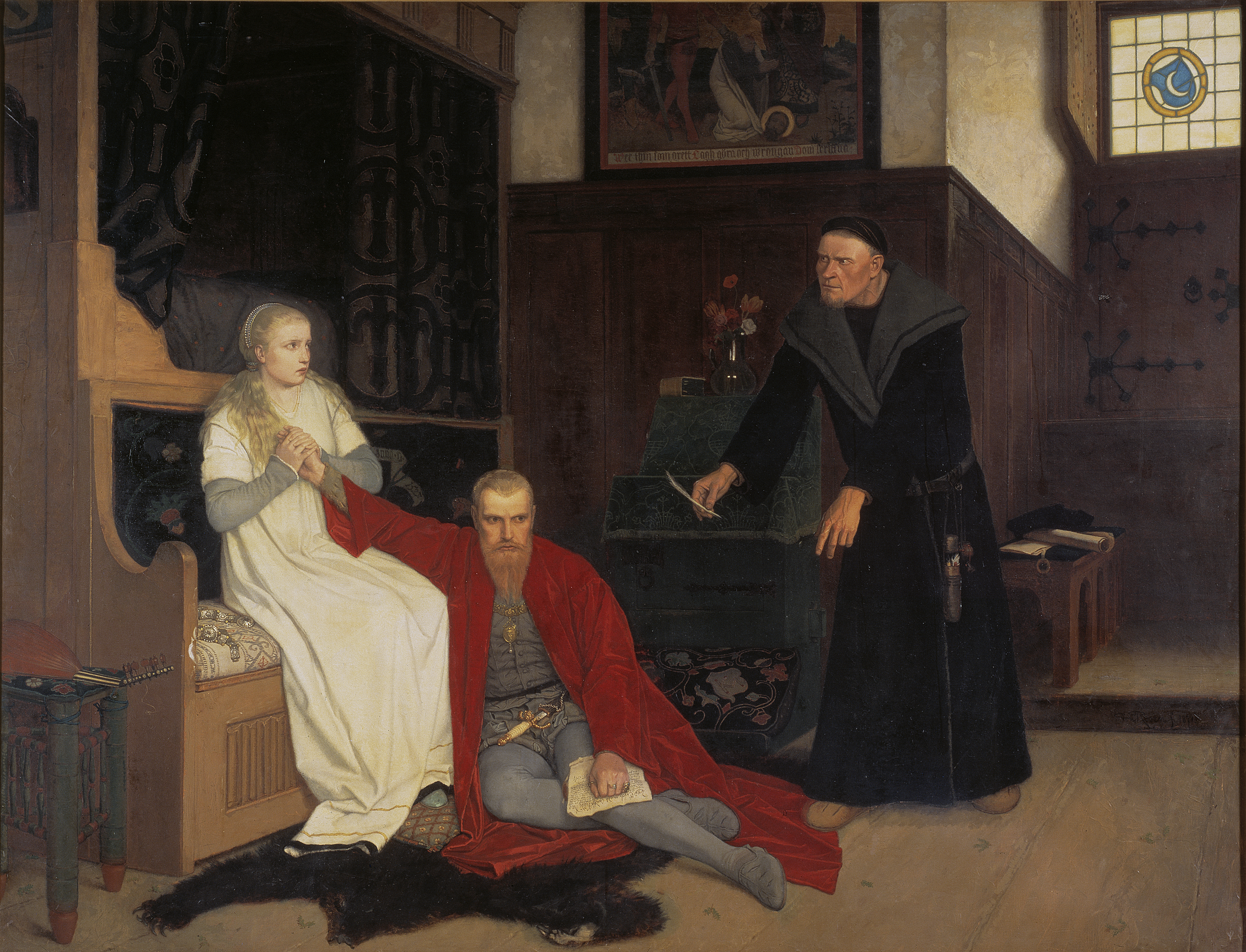
Karin Månsdotter, Erik XIV and Jöran Persson, in Georg von Rosen's painting of 1871

Sometime in 1567, Erik decided to marry Karin in accordance to the agreement he made with the council in 1561, which allowed him to marry whom he pleased. His plans was supported by his advisor Jöran Persson, as foreign negotiations had failed and a native aristocrat as queen would have threatened Persson's position. Karin is reported to have been a good friend of Persson's wife Anna Andersdotter, who apparently often accompanied her on her travels between the different royal palaces.

It is unknown whether Karin Månsdotter had any political influence, but a popular image in Swedish history was of her serving as a counterweight to Jöran Persson; a painting by Georg von Rosen three hundred years later (1871) illustrates this, showing the king on the floor, confused by his inner demons, with Karin Månsdotter at one side holding his hand, looking like an innocent angel giving him strength to resist the demands of Jöran Persson, standing on the other side of him, trying to get him to sign a document.

Her contemporaries, especially the nobles at court, early used her to appeal to Erik on their behalf, and it seems as she did her best to do so, which is illustrated in the Sture Murders in Uppsala in 1567, which could perhaps describe the form of her influence on Erik. In May 1567, Erik is considered to have suffered from some sort of mental collapse. He imprisoned several men from the Sture noble family, among them Count Svante Sture. Countess Märta Sture, sister of the former queen Margaret Leijonhufvud, appealed to Karin Månsdotter for the prisoners' protection. Karin assured her no-one would hurt the prisoners. Later the same morning, the king visited Svante Sture in prison, fell on his knees before him and begged for his friendship. Later the same day, however, the Sture prisoners were executed. Erik disappeared shortly afterwards, and Karin participated in the search; he was found in the Odensala vicarage.

Karin Månsdotter donated to the sisters of Vadstena Abbey on three occasions between 1566 and 1568, and it is noted that her largest donation was made during Erik's sickness in 1567.

== Queen ==
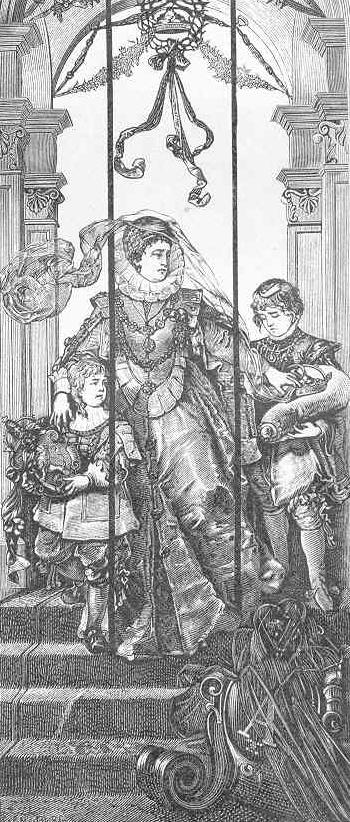
An 1870s glass painting by Wladimir Swertschkoff above her grave in the Cathedral of Turku shows Karin Månsdotter "rejecting the crown" with two of her pages.

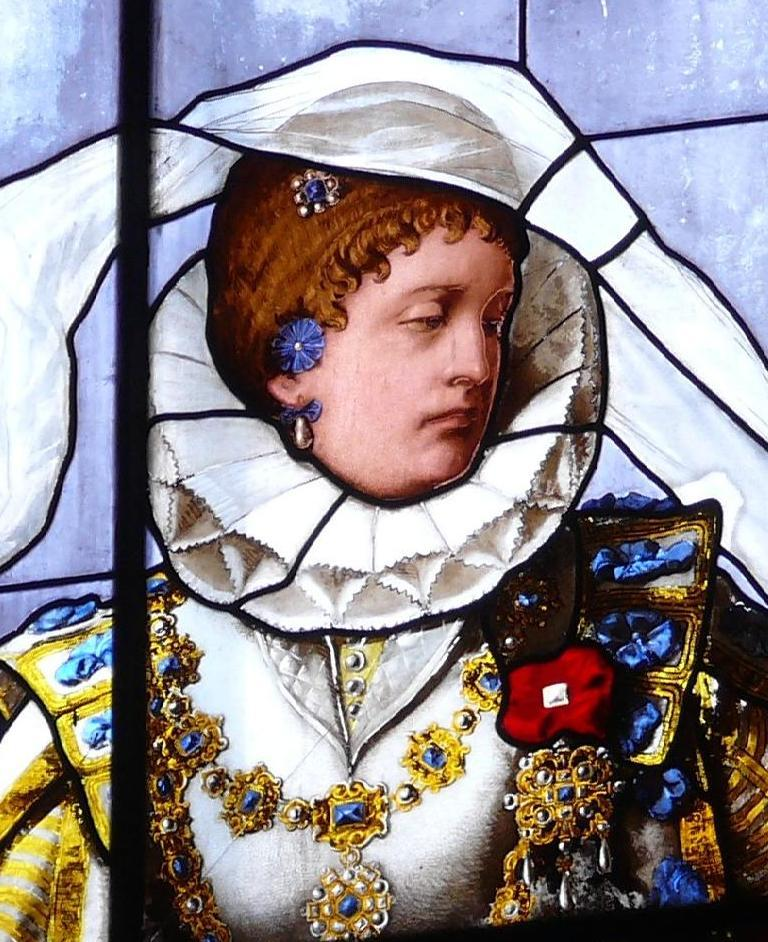
Close-up of Karin Månsdotter's face from the window painting (above)

Erik XIV married Karin morganatically in 1567, and officially in 1568, when she was ennobled and crowned queen under the name Katarina Magnusdotter (a formal version of her name). The first, secret wedding ceremony, was performed by Archbishop Laurentius Petri on 29 December 1567. During this period, Erik was periodically affected by his mental problems, and a regency ruled in his stead. The marriage, Erik's mental problems and Karin's elevation caused rumours. In a letter to Erik's sister Sophia, it was reported that "The lunacy which dominates him is a consequence of his deeds. He was somewhat unstable even before, and now he is completely so, guided by his wife", implying that Karin used witchcraft. The wife of Jöran Persson, Anna Andersdotter, a close friend of Karin, was accused of having spread the rumours and sentenced for slander, but was pardoned at the request of Karin herself. The regency arrested many of Erik's advisors, and Karin intervened for many of them. When Erik recovered and the regency was ended, Karin intervened to make peace between Erik and his brother, Duke John.

On 10 February 1568, Karin was ennobled and given the official seal of a queen. In a letter to her sisters-in-law, the princesses Sophia and Elisabeth, she erased the first draft, which formally called them "Dear sisters", and she did not call herself "Queen", but "Chosen Queen", which has been interpreted as meaning that she knew that her position was not fully accepted within the aristocracy. Erik is reported to have plans to have his brothers and other enemies killed before the wedding, but they were warned of these plans by Karin Månsdotter through the dowager queen Catherine Stenbock. These people did not attend the wedding.

The official wedding took place in Storkyrkan on 4 July 1568, followed the next day by the coronation. Karin Månsdotter was walked to the altar by the king's cousin Per Brahe under a banner of golden textile carried by four nobles. The wedding was unique; never before had the children of the couple been present at a royal wedding. Both the infant son and the daughter of Erik and Karin were present to confirm their official status. They were placed under the banner between their parents. On 9 June the son was baptized carried by Catherine Stenbock. The coronation was celebrated with great festivities in Stockholm to confirm the new queen's legitimacy. Karin's peasant relatives, her three maternal uncles from Uppland, Hans Jakobsson, Jakob Jakobsson and Erik Nilsson, were present dressed in clothes made for them by the royal tailor. During the coronation, Lord Chancellor Nils Gyllenstierna fainted and dropped the crown he was carrying to the floor. This was regarded as a bad omen.

During her period as queen, Karin gave gifts to her friends and relatives, such as Anna Nilsdotter i Hammarstorp, who has been identified as her sister despite her different patronymicon, her paternal cousins in Sko kloster, and her "Fränka" (meaning "female relative") Anna Eriksdotter i Sko. Queen Karin is noted to have granted two royal estates in 1568: on 1 May, she granted the income from Rörstrand in Solna to Torbrjörn Klockare in Stockholm, and on 24 July, she granted Aleby in Botkyrka to Lasse Jakobsson, signing herself in the first document as "Karin Månsdotter" and in the second as "Katarina Regina". On both occasions, she described different privileges and conditions for the holders. Granting royal estates and deciding their privileges was something normally done by monarchs, and showed her personal influence.

Soon after the coronation, Erik's brothers rebelled and he was imprisoned.

=== Imprisonment ===
Karin was imprisoned with Erik at first at the Royal Palace of Stockholm, and then at the Castle of Turku (1570–71), at Kastelholm Castle in Åland, at Gripsholm Castle (1571–73) and Västerås Castle (1573). Shortly after they were imprisoned, their children were placed in the care of Catherine Stenbock and their French governess Johanna de Herboville, but were reunited with their parents in 1570. Karin gave birth to two children in captivity in 1570 and 1572, both of whom died in prison. During their imprisonment, it was reported that Karin reproached Erik for the people he had killed during his reign, "as he in his power had innocent people put to death and by doing so caused the imprisonment and misery of his wife and children as well as himself".

In the summer of 1569, an attempt to free the prisoners and restore Erik to his throne (the 1569 Plot) was made by a group of conspirators led by Karin's head lady-in-waiting, Elin Andersdotter, and Karin's personal secretary, Thomas Jakobsson. The conspiracy was discovered, and Andersdotter and Jakobsson were executed. Erik was involved in the plans, but it is not mentioned in the documents if Karin was, although the leading conspirators were in her employment. It is known that Erik was on at least three occasions physically abused by his keeper, but it is not thought that this happened in the presence of Karin.

Queen Karin and her children were separated from her husband on 14 June 1573 to prevent the birth of any more legitimate offspring. King Erik wrote in his diary: "My wife has been taken from me by use of violence". Karin and her children were taken to the Castle of Turku (Åbo) in Finland, where she remained under house arrest until the death of her husband four years later. During these years, two conspiracies were discovered with the purpose of reinstating Erik: the Mornay Plot, and another plot two years later. In 1575, her son was taken from her and sent to Poland to be placed under the care of the Jesuits, but she was allowed to keep her daughter. In 1577, she received the news of her husband's death. She was treated with kindness and given the royal estate Liuksiala Manor in Kangasala, Finland, where she lived the rest of her life.

== Widowhood ==
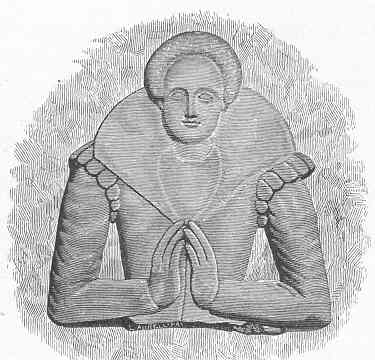
Bust of Karin Månsdotter at her gravesite

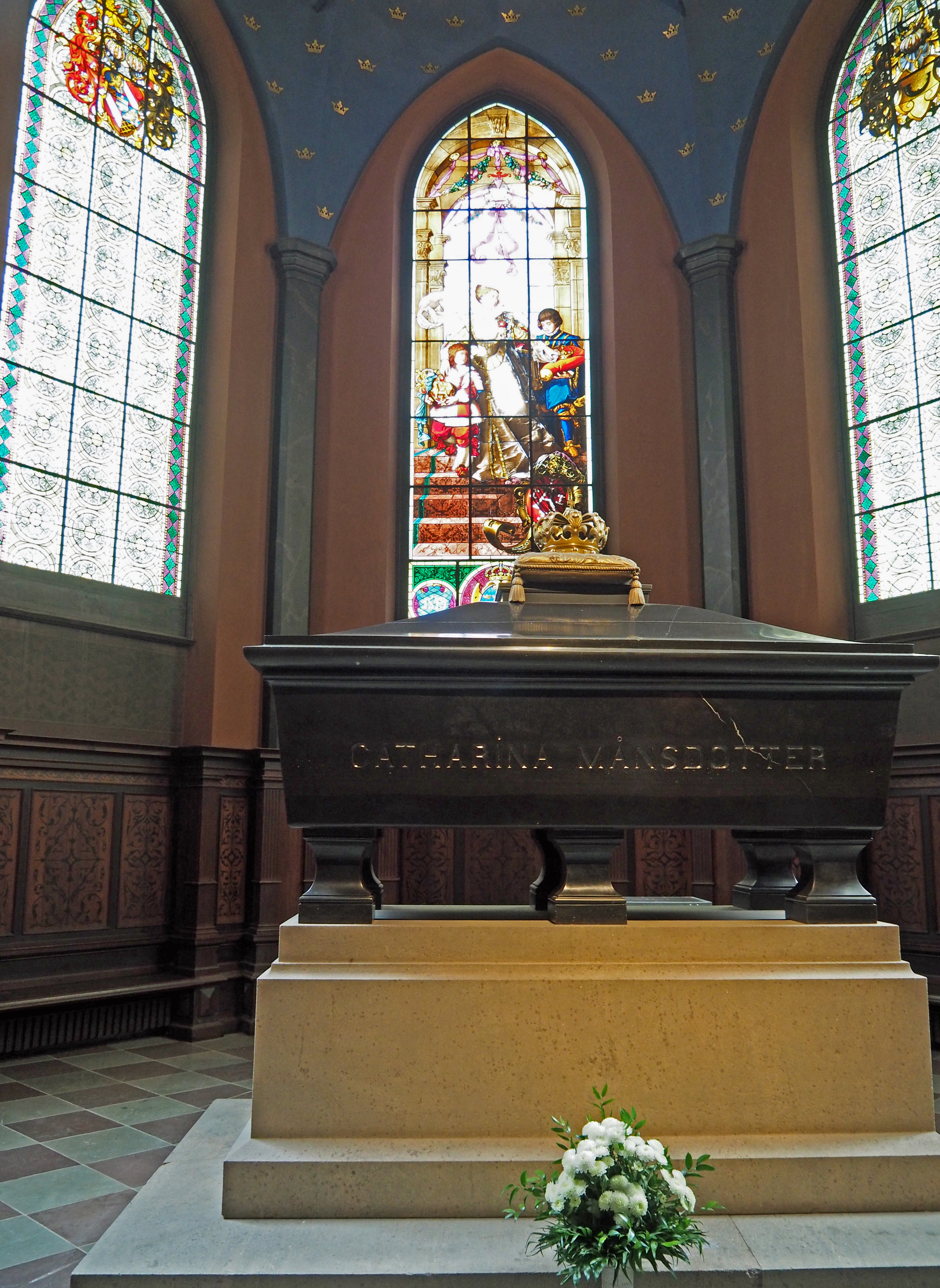
Karin Månsdotter's tomb and burial monument in Turku Cathedral

Karin Månsdotter returned to the Swedish court on two occasions. In 1577, newly widowed, she travelled to Stockholm to ask for financial support, which she received. The second time was in 1582, when she met with Queen Catherine Jagiellon and the dowager queen Catherine Stenbock at Svartsjö Castle, in what was called "The Meeting of Three Queens Catherine".

In 1587, her daughter Sigrid was appointed lady-in-waiting to the new king's daughter, Princess Anna, who followed her brother King Sigismund to Warsaw where he had been elected king. Karin accompanied her on her journey. In Warsaw, she met her son Gustaf again, twelve years after he had been taken from her. She saw him once again in Estonia in 1595, and unlike the previous meeting, this meeting has been confirmed. He was now a Catholic, had forgotten her and they could not speak to each other because he had forgotten the Swedish language, the only language Karin was able to speak; she could identify him only by his birthmarks. He was poor and worked as a mercenary. She tried to help him financially, and for the rest of her life tried to get permission for him to return to Sweden, but never saw him again. Her daughter Sigrid, on the other hand, married two Swedish noblemen and often spent time with her mother.

Karin became respected and liked in Finland; during the great peasant rebellion (Cudgel War) in 1596–97, the rebels refrained from plundering her estate. She was also successful in managing the affairs of the estate; in 1587, Liuksiala Manor was one of the most lucrative estates in Finland, and in 1599 it became the second-most lucrative. She kept her neutrality during the Finnish aristocracy's conflict with Charles IX of Sweden in 1597–99. Her daughter, whose spouse had been loyal to King Sigismund, was forced to flee from Charles IX to Riga in 1598, but when she returned in 1603, Karin gave her refuge.

In August 1605, Charles IX gave instructions that Karin and her niece (her sister's daughter, who was apparently staying with her) be moved to Stockholm. It is not known why, but it may have been because of the political situation in Russia, where her son was a participant. However, the instructions were never carried out. In 1606, Karin asked Charles for permission to free her tenants from the royal taxes so she could use their tax money to buy the freedom of her son, who was at the time a prisoner in Russia, but the king refused. In 1607, Karin nonetheless forbade her tenants to pay the royal taxes. The king then sent her his representatives to explain that this could not be accepted. Soon after, the affair ended with the death of her son in captivity.

She died peacefully after a period of illness at Liuksiala. She is buried in the Cathedral of Turku. She and her daughter Sigrid are the only Swedish royals to be buried in Finland.

Karin Månsdotter was the first royal mistress to a Swedish monarch to become queen since Christina Abrahamsdotter in 1470. Although three queens of Sweden in her same century were not of royal blood, but noblewomen, Karin Månsdotter was the only one before Silvia (1976) who was a commoner — not counting Queen Desideria, who although born a commoner became Princess of Ponte Corvo four years before becoming Swedish royalty.

== Family ==
Karin Månsdotter had the following children with the king:

- Princess Sigrid of Sweden (1566–1633) (born before the marriage), lady-in-waiting, spouse of two nobles
- Prince Gustav of Sweden (1568–1607)
- Henrik (1570–1574)
- Arnold (1572–1573)

== Karin Månsdotter in fiction ==
Karin Månsdotter has been portrayed in films and books. The film Karin Månsdotter by Alf Sjöberg was made in 1954. Finnish author Mika Waltari wrote a historical novel Catherine in 1942 (originally written in Finnish, and translated in to Swedish in 1943).

== Legacy ==
The asteroid 832 Karin is named in her honour.

== Notes ==
Karin Månsdotter Born: 6 November 1550 Died: 13 September 1612
Swedish royalty
Vacant Title next held by Katarina Stenbock	Queen consort of Sweden; 1568	Succeeded by Catherine Jagellon
