= Erik XIV =

King of Sweden from 1560 to 1569

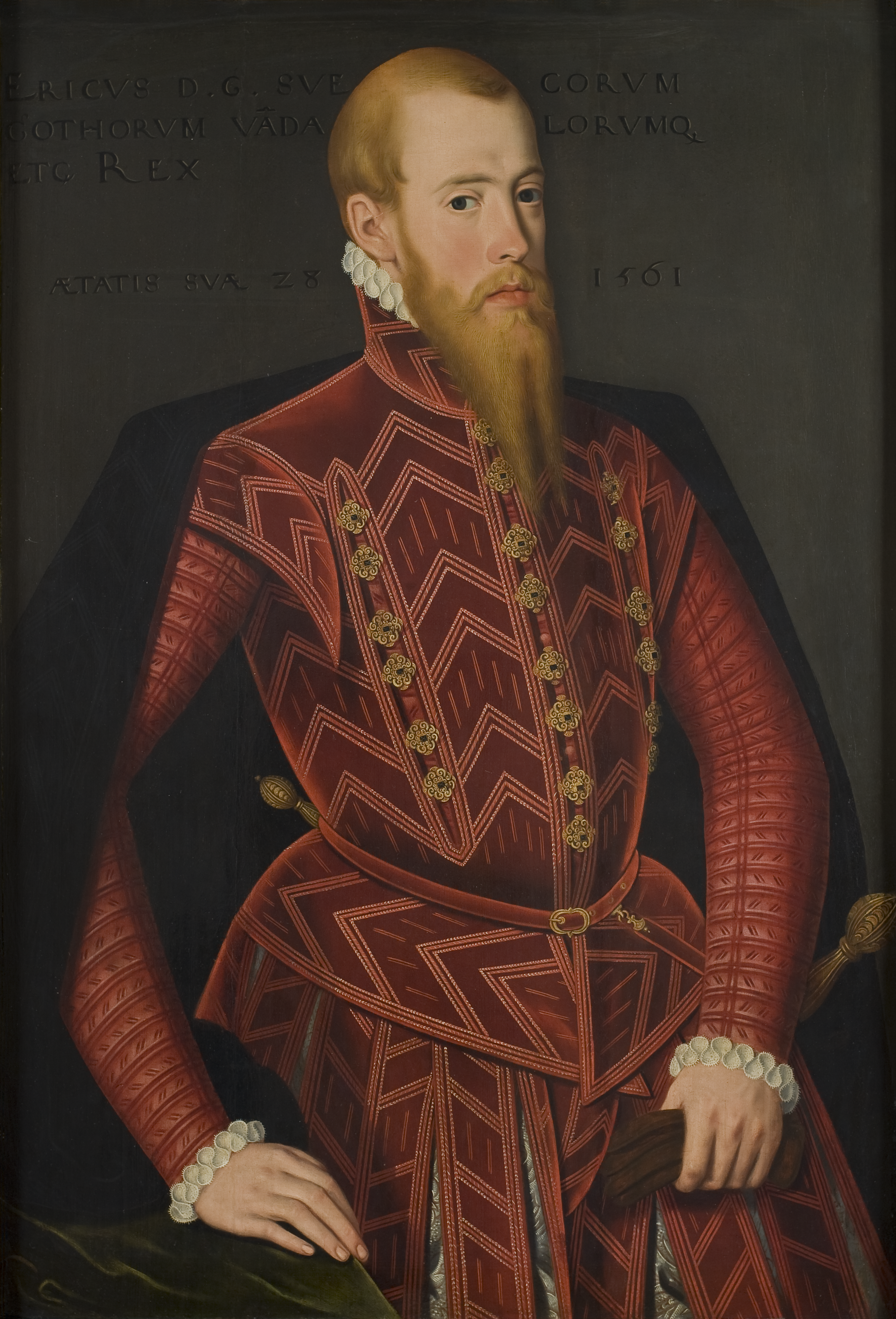
- Portrait by Domenicus Verwilt, 1561

King of Sweden
- Reign: 29 September 1560 – January 1569
- Coronation: 29 June 1561
- Predecessor: Gustav I
- Successor: John III
- Born: 13 December 1533; Tre Kronor Castle, Stockholm, Sweden
- Died: 26 February 1577 (aged 43); Örbyhus Castle, Örbyhus, Sweden
- Burial: 1 April 1577; Västerås Cathedral, Västerås, Sweden
- Spouse: Karin Månsdotter (m. 1568)
- Issue more...: Virginia Eriksdotter; Constantia Eriksdotter; Princess Sigrid; Prince Gustav
- House: Vasa
- Father: Gustav I
- Mother: Catherine of Saxe-Lauenburg
- Religion: Lutheran

Erik XIV or Eric XIV (13 December 1533 – 26 February 1577) became King of Sweden following the death of his father, Gustav I, on 29 September 1560. During his reign, Erik sought to centralize royal authority and expand Swedish influence in the Baltic region, incorporating Reval (now Tallinn) and northern Estonia into the realm in 1561 to lay the foundations of the Swedish Baltic Empire. To consolidate control, he enacted the Articles of Arboga (1561), which restricted the political power of his half-brothers. His ambitions to control Baltic trade routes also led Sweden into the Northern Seven Years' War (1563–1570) against Denmark–Norway and Lübeck.

While Erik was regarded as intelligent, artistically skilled, and a promoter of Renaissance court culture, early in his reign he showed signs of mental instability, a condition that eventually led to insanity. Some scholars claim that his illness began early during his reign, while others believe that it first manifested with the Sture murders. During a 1568 rebellion against him, Erik was incarcerated by his half-brother John III. He was formally deposed by the Riksdag on 26 January 1569.

Erik, having been imprisoned and deposed, was most likely murdered. An examination of his remains in 1958 confirmed that he probably died of arsenic poisoning.

== Early years ==
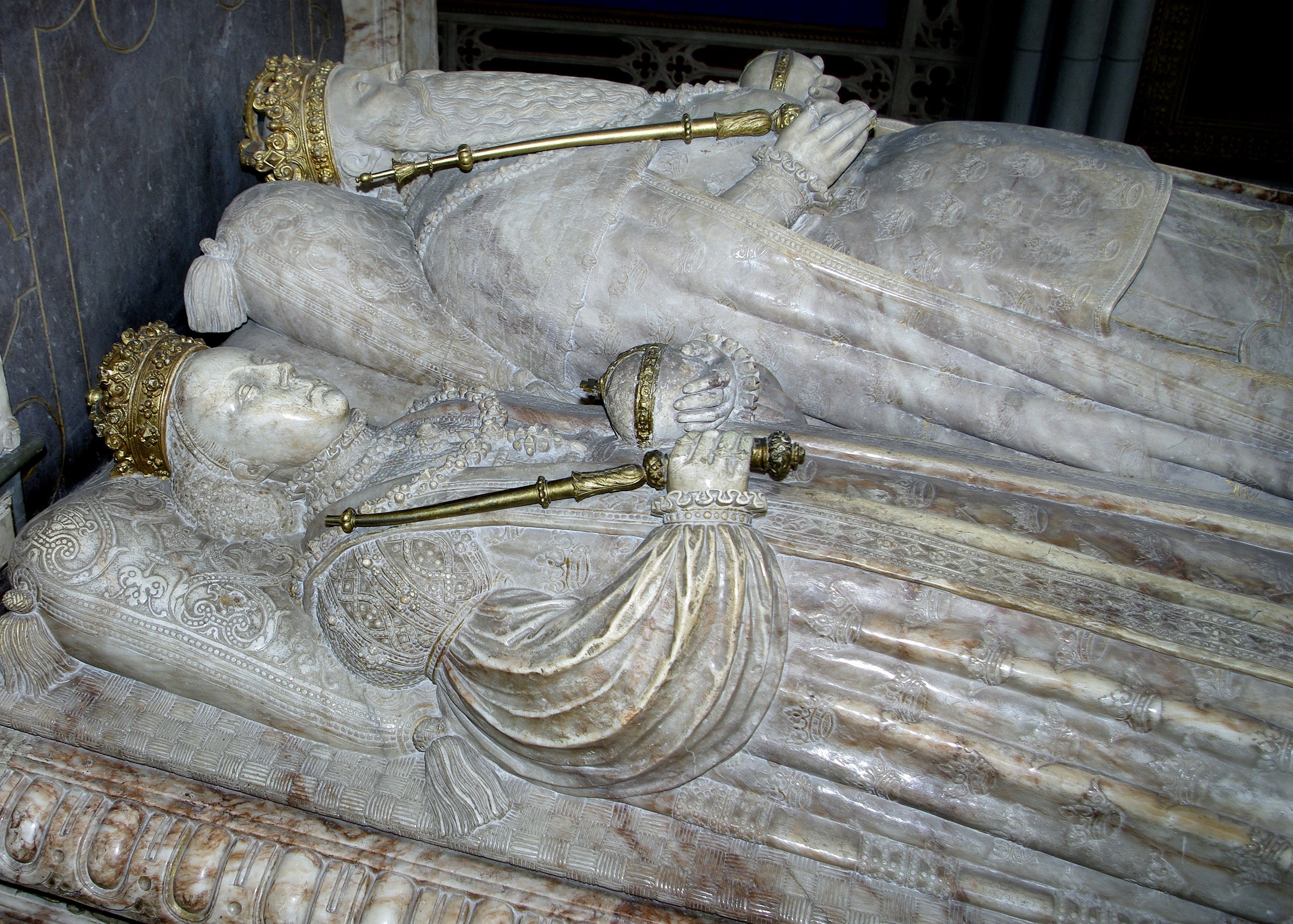
Erik's parents, King Gustav I and Queen Catherine, as depicted on their grave monument

Erik XIV was born at Tre Kronor Castle on the morning of 13 December 1533. His mother, Catherine of Saxe-Lauenburg, died before he was two years old. In 1536, his father, Gustav I (Gustav Vasa), married Margaret Leijonhufvud, a Swedish noblewoman.

Erik's first teacher was the German scholar Georg Norman, whose services were soon required elsewhere within the Swedish state. He was succeeded by the French Calvinist Dionysius Beurraeus (1500–1567), who taught both Erik and his half-brother John and appears to have been well regarded by both. Erik excelled in foreign languages and mathematics. He was also knowledgeable in history, a skilled writer, and familiar with astrology.

When Erik began to appear in public, he was referred to as "chosen king" (utvald konung). Following the meeting of parliament in Stockholm in 1560, he received the title of "hereditary king" (arvkonung).

In 1557, Erik was granted the fiefdoms of Kalmar, Kronoberg and Öland and took up residence in Kalmar.

Against his father's wishes, Erik entered into marriage negotiations with the future Elizabeth I of England and pursued her for several years. Tensions between Erik and his father grew. Erik also made unsuccessful marriage proposals to, among others, Mary, Queen of Scots (1542–1587), Renata of Lorraine (1544–1602), Anna of Saxony (1544–1577) and Christine of Hesse (1543–1604).

== Rule ==
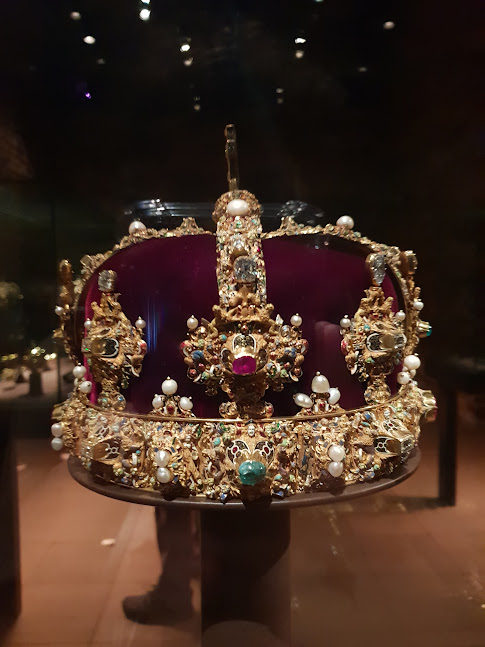
His crown (side view), made in Stockholm in 1561, remains the official crown of the King of Sweden and is now displayed in the Treasury at Stockholm Palace.

Erik learned of his father's death as he was on the point of embarking for England to press his suit for the hand of Queen Elizabeth I. Back in Stockholm he summoned a Riksdag, which met at Arboga on 15 April 1561. There he adopted the royal propositions known as the "Arboga articles", considerably curtailing the authority of the royal dukes, his half-brothers John and Charles, in their respective provinces. He was crowned as Erik XIV. (Note: He was not necessarily the 14th king of Sweden named Erik. He and his brother Charles adopted regnal numbers according to Johannes Magnus's partly fictitious history of Sweden. There had, however, been at least six earlier Swedish kings with the name of Erik, as well as pretenders about whom very little is known.)

From the start of his reign, Erik was in opposition to the Swedish nobility. He chose as a close adviser Jöran Persson (1530–68), who had narrowly escaped execution under Erik's father. Persson was also opposed to the nobility and a determined opponent of Erik's half-brother, later John III of Sweden (1537–92). John was the Duke of Finland and was married to a Polish princess, against Erik's wishes, which made him friendly with Poland. John pursued an expansionist policy in Livonia (now Estonia and Latvia), in breach of the Arboga articles, which led to contention between the brothers. In 1563, John was seized by an army sent to Finland, and tried for high treason by Erik's order.

Unlike his father, who had been satisfied with ruling an independent state, Erik tried to expand his influence in the Baltic region and in Estonia, beginning the process that resulted in Sweden becoming a great power in the 17th century. This expansionism resulted in a clash with his cousin, Frederick II of Denmark–Norway (1534–88). Most of Erik XIV's reign was then dominated by the Livonian War and the Scandinavian Seven Years' War against Denmark–Norway (1563–70), during which he successfully repelled most Danish-Norwegian attempts at conquest, but was unable to keep his own acquisitions.

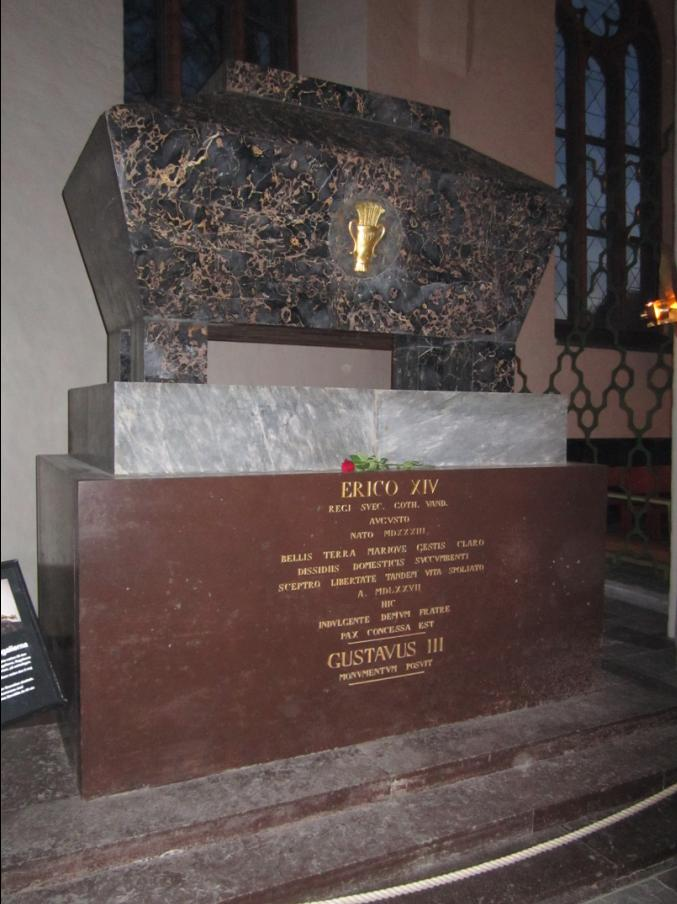
Erik's sarcophagus in Västerås Cathedral

From 1563 onwards, his insanity became pronounced; his rule became even more arbitrary and marked by violence. His suspicion of the nobility led him to suspicions of the Sture family, then headed by Svante Stensson Sture, the brother-in-law of Erik's father. King Erik first acted against the family in 1566, accusing Svante's son Nils of treason, but commuted the sentence and instead sent Nils to Lorraine, supposedly to arrange a marriage with Princess Renata of Lorraine. However, Erik had determined to marry his mistress Karin Månsdotter and in 1567, on Nils's return and suspicious of high treason, he killed several members of the family in the so-called Sture Murders, Erik himself stabbing Nils Svantesson Sture. The king probably thought of the killing as an execution rather than murder.

== Downfall ==
After the Sture murders, Duke John was imprisoned and Erik's conflict with the nobility came to its climax. Early in 1568, Erik seemed to recover his reason, and attempted to reconcile with his brother on the condition that the latter recognize Erik's marriage with Karin Månsdotter. This marriage was solemnized in July, Karin was crowned queen, and their infant son Gustav pronounced prince-royal. However, in the fall of 1568, asserting Erik's insanity, the dukes and the nobles rebelled, and after some resistance, Erik was imprisoned by John, who took power on 30 September. Jöran Persson was assigned much of the blame for the actions directed against the nobility during Erik XIV's reign and was executed shortly after John III had incarcerated Erik, who was legally dethroned in January 1569 by the Riksdag.

== Imprisonment and death ==
For the next eight years the ex-king was a source of anxiety to the new government. Three rebellions – the 1569 Plot, the Mornay Plot and the 1576 Plot – with the object of releasing and reinstating him, had to be suppressed, and Erik was held as a prisoner in many different castles in both Sweden and Finland. He died in prison in Örbyhus Castle. According to a tradition starting with Johannes Messenius, his final meal was a poisoned bowl of pea soup. A document signed by his brother, John III, and a nobleman, Bengt Bengtsson Gylta (1514–74), gave Erik's guards in his last prison authorization to poison him if anyone tried to release him. His body was later exhumed and modern forensic analysis revealed evidence of lethal arsenic poisoning.

== Family and descendants ==
Erik XIV had several relationships before his marriage.

With Agda Persdotter, he had three daughters:

- Virginia Eriksdotter (1559–1633), who has living descendants
- Constantia Eriksdotter (1560–1649), who has living descendants
- Lucretia Eriksdotter (1564–after 1574), who died young

With Karin Jacobsdotter, he had:

- An unnamed child, who died in April 1565

Erik XIV married Karin Månsdotter (1550–1612) on 4 July 1568. They had four children:

- Sigrid (1566–1633), born before the marriage; a lady-in-waiting who married two noblemen
- Gustav (1568–1607), born before the marriage; a mercenary
- Henrik (1570–1574)
- Arnold (1572–1573)

== Erik XIV in literature ==
The life of Erik XIV is the subject of the 1899 play Erik XIV by Swedish playwright August Strindberg (1849–1912), which was later adapted into the film Karin Månsdotter. The relationship between Erik XIV and Karin Månsdotter is also the subject of the 1942 historical novel Karin Månsdotter by Mika Waltari.

== Gallery ==
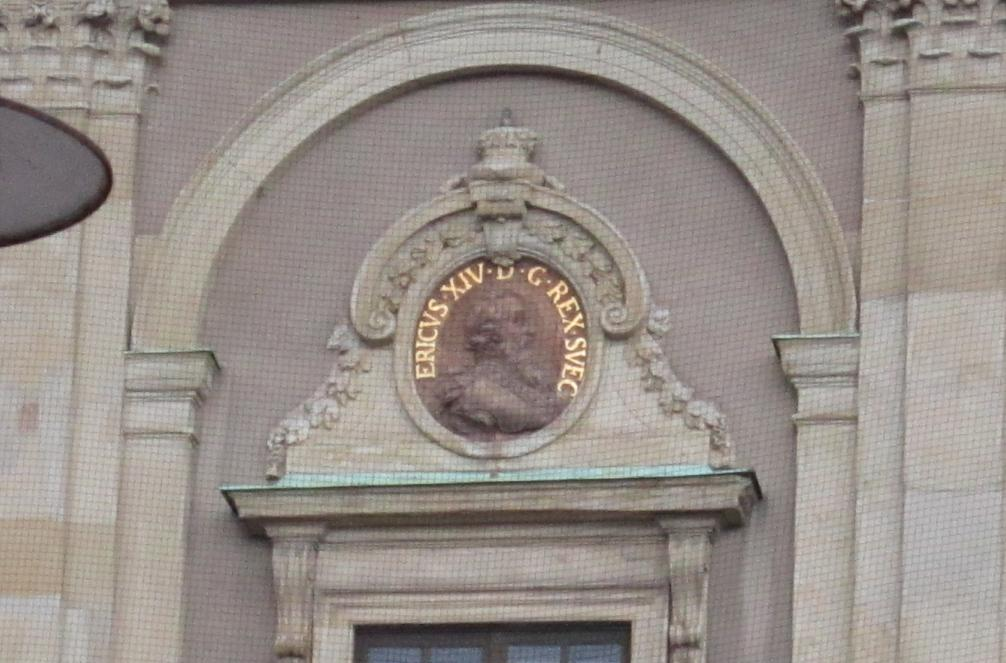
Image of Erik XIV on a wall of Stockholm Palace

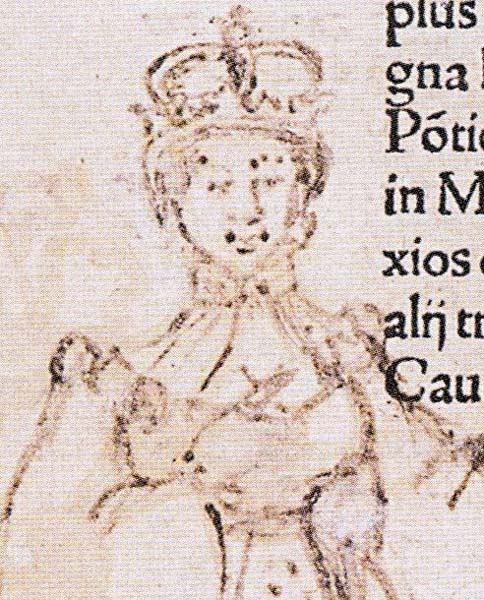
Karin Månsdotter as drawn by her husband

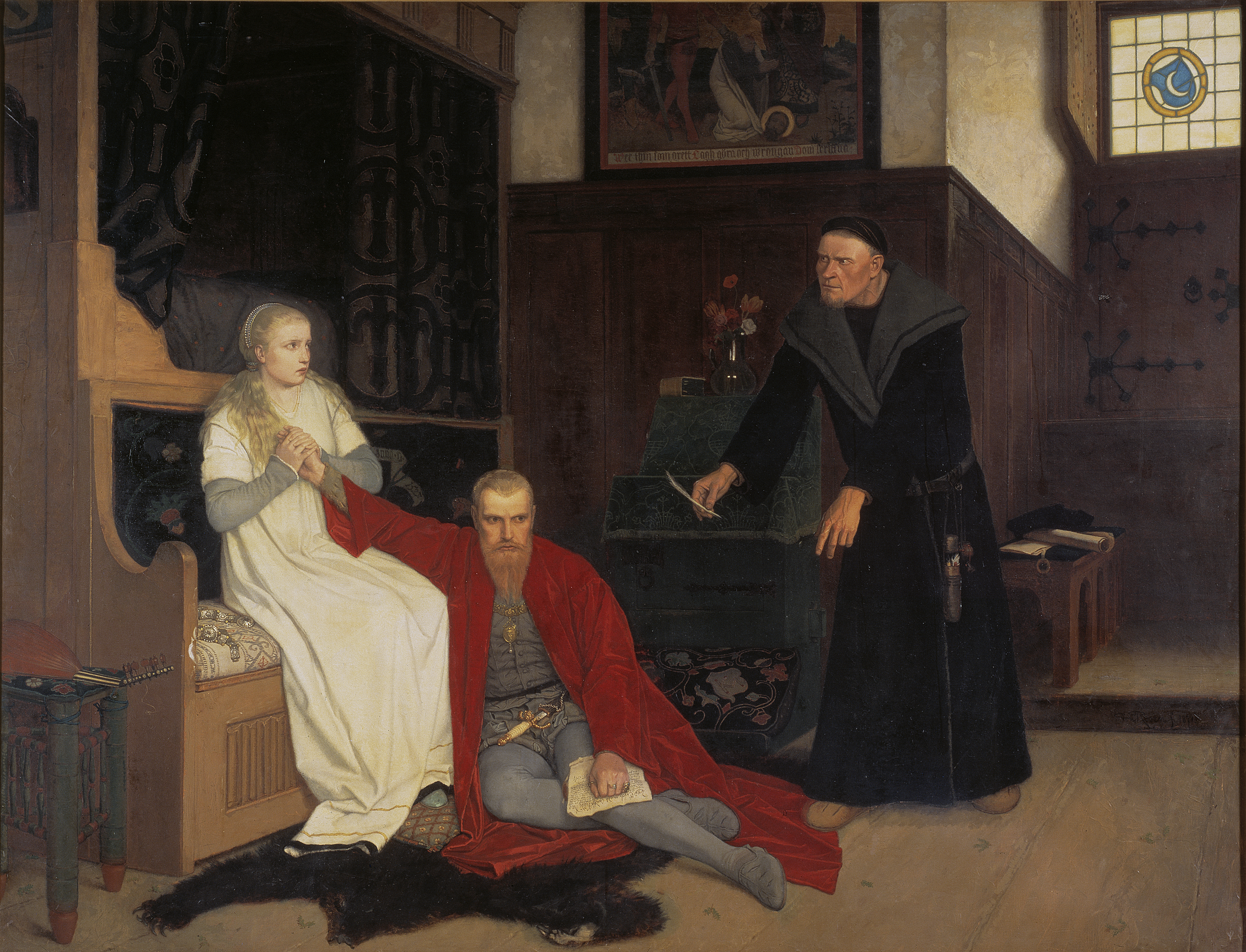
Karin Månsdotter, Erik XIV and Jöran Persson in Georg von Rosen's painting of 1871

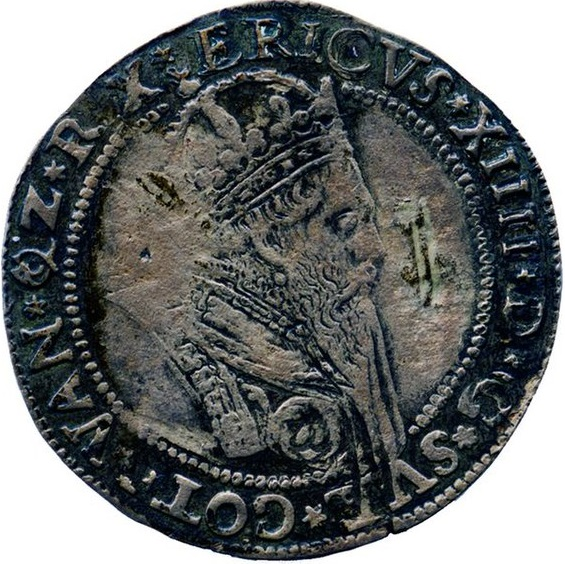
One of Erik's coins

== See also ==
- List of Swedish monarchs
- List of Finnish monarchs and Heads of State
- History of Sweden
- History of Sweden (1523–1611)

== Notes ==
Erik XIV House of Vasa Born: 13 December 1533 Died: 26 February 1577
Regnal titles
Preceded by Gustav I	King of Sweden; 1560–1569	Succeeded by John III
