= Siege of Stegeborg (1543) =

Peasant siege of Stegeborg during the Dacke War

- Part of the Dacke War
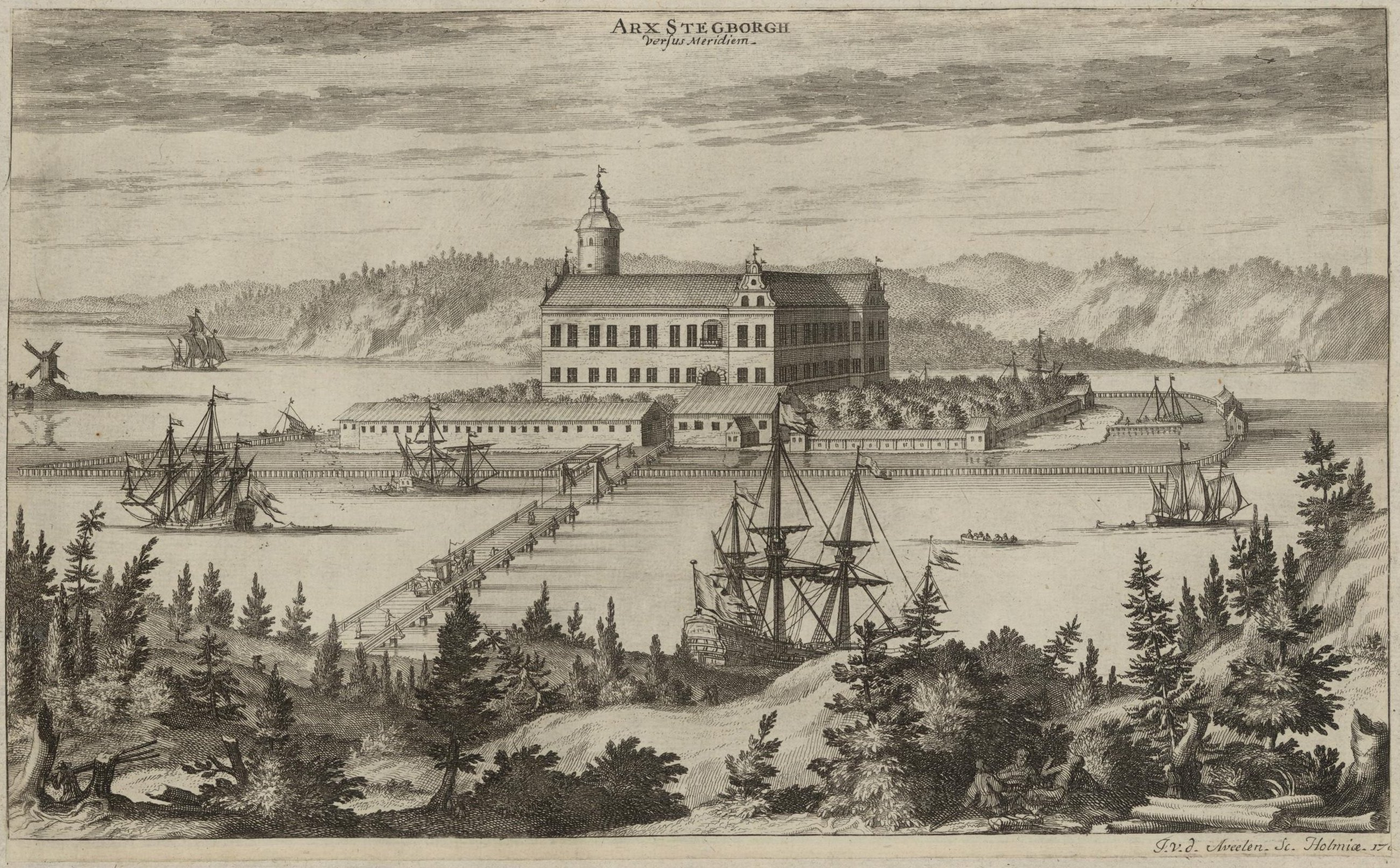
- 1700 Depiction of Stegeborg by Jan van den Aveelen in Suecia antiqua et hodierna
Date	February 1543
Location	Stegeborg, Östergötland 58°26′30″N 16°35′54″E
Result	Swedish victory

Belligerents
Sweden	Rebels

Commanders and leaders
Svante Sture; Johan Turesson; Joakim Bulgrin	Erik Ölänning; Per Djup; Unknown (POW)

Units involved
Stegeborg garrison Relief force	Unknown

Strength
Unknown	700+ men

Casualties and losses
Unknown	40–150 killed and/or captured

The siege of Stegeborg (Swedish: belägringen av Stegeborg) occurred in February 1543 during the Dacke War.

In February, Småland peasants numbering 700 under the command of Erik Ölänning and Per Djup departed from Tjust, marching towards Stegeborg. When they arrived, they besieged it from both land and sea but faced heavy resistance from its commander, Svante Sture. Eventually, however, the peasants were able to capture several guns from the fortress. Unexpectedly, however, Erik Ölänning defected for unknown reasons, and sent the majority of his men home. The ones who remained were soon killed by the Swedish relief force under Johan Turesson and Joakim Bulgrin.

== Background ==
In 1542, as a result of Gustav Vasa banning the sale of oxen and butter to Denmark, peasants in Småland revolted under the leadership of Nils Dacke. They used the forest to ambush the royal troops, and soon controlled large parts of Småland and Östergötland.

In February 1543, the rebels began offensives against the royal troops and castles in Östergötland. As part of this, Erik Ölänning began marching towards Stegeborg to capture it in the same month.

== Siege ==
In February 1543, Erik Ölänning departed from Tjust with 700 men, of which 300 were under the command of Per Djup. On the way, Erik Ölänning also received support from the burghers in Västervik. During the march, more peasants joined his force, and Häradssäter and Björkvik were plundered.

When Erik Ölänning arrived to Stegeborg, he immediately managed to capture several guns from the fortress. The peasants also besieged Stegeborg from the seaside. During the first phases, the peasants faced heavy resistance from Stegeborg's commander, Svante Sture, according to Peder Svart's chronicle about the Dacke War:

Om morgonen bittida föll herr Svante med sitt folk till fienderna ut på ijsen. Fienderna togo så en holma in, men herr Svante slog dem tre resor från samma holma. Fienderna fingo där stoor hugg og nederlagh, men herr Svante miste icke en karl. Annan dagen om morgonen drog herr Svante ut igen med sitt folk och hade två falkoneter – ett slags kanoner - laddade med hagel, dem lett han avgå på fienderna. Blevo där många slagna och måste giva flykten, men [---] den andre förrädarhopen trängde sig mellan herr Svante och slottet, så att de nödgades med luttert våld och makt att slå sig igenom fiendernas hop, så att de som nogast fingo slottsporten in och fingo slå honom igen efter sig. Fingo smålänningarna de två falkoneterna och tio hästar från herr Svante.

Despite this, Svante Sture was forced to wait for a relief force to arrive. It is possible that, in order to stall for time, he invited the peasants for negotiations, and unexpectedly Erik Ölänning announced that he wanted to defect. The exact reason is unknown, it could've been promises of something in return, amnesty, or he believed that he could never hope to capture Stegeborg before reinforcements arrived. The more likely reason is that he was promised a sum of money.

After defecting, he returned the majority of his men back to their homes. On February 17, a relief force under the command of Joakim Bulgrin and Johan Turesson was dispatched from Gripsholm, which arrived to Stegeborg on 19 February. The few peasants that remained were surprised were killed by the relief force. Some 40–150 were killed, others being captured including one of the leaders.

== Aftermath ==
After defecting, Erik Ölänning travelled to Gripsholm where he told the king, Gustav Vasa, about Nils Dacke's strategies. He also created a list of local leaders.

== See also ==
- Battle of Virserum – Battle between rebels and Swedish troops
- Battle of Haddorp – Battle between rebels and Swedish troops

== Works cited ==
- Alvemo, Bo [in Swedish] (2006). Dackefejden: det stora upproret 1542-1543 [Dacke Feud: the great uprising of 1542-1543] (in Swedish). Hallstavik: Svenskt Militärhistoriskt bibliotek. ISBN 9789197531597.
- Adolfsson, Mats (2007). Fogdemakt och bondevrede 1500 - 1718 [Bailiff power and peasant anger 1500 - 1718] (in Swedish). Natur & Kultur. ISBN 9789127356900.
- Larsson, Lars-Olof [in Swedish] (2002). Gustav Vasa: Landsfader eller tyrann? [Gustav Vasa: Father of the Nation or Tyrant?] (in Swedish). Norstedts. ISBN 9789151839042.
- Boëthius, Bertil [in Swedish]; Hahr, A. [in Swedish] (1926). "Joakim (Jochim Jacob) Bulgrin". sok.riksarkivet.se.
