= Västra Valla =

City district in Linköping, Sweden

Coordinates: 58°23′38″N 15°34′30″E

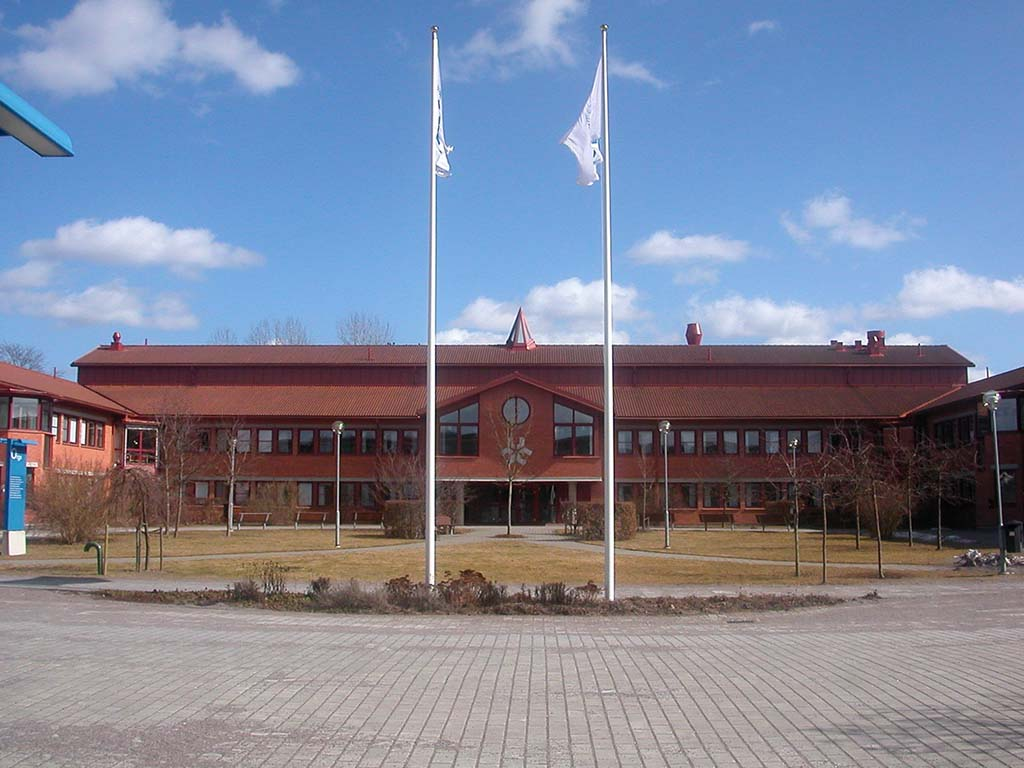
Linköping University admin building

Västra Valla is a city district in western Linköping. Västra Valla includes the campus of Linköping University.

Districts adjoining Västra Valla are East Valla, Gottfridsberg, Garnisonen, Lambohov, Mjärdevi, Djurgården and Ryd.
