= Lambohov =

City district in Linköping, Sweden

Coordinates: 58°22′54″N 15°34′18″E

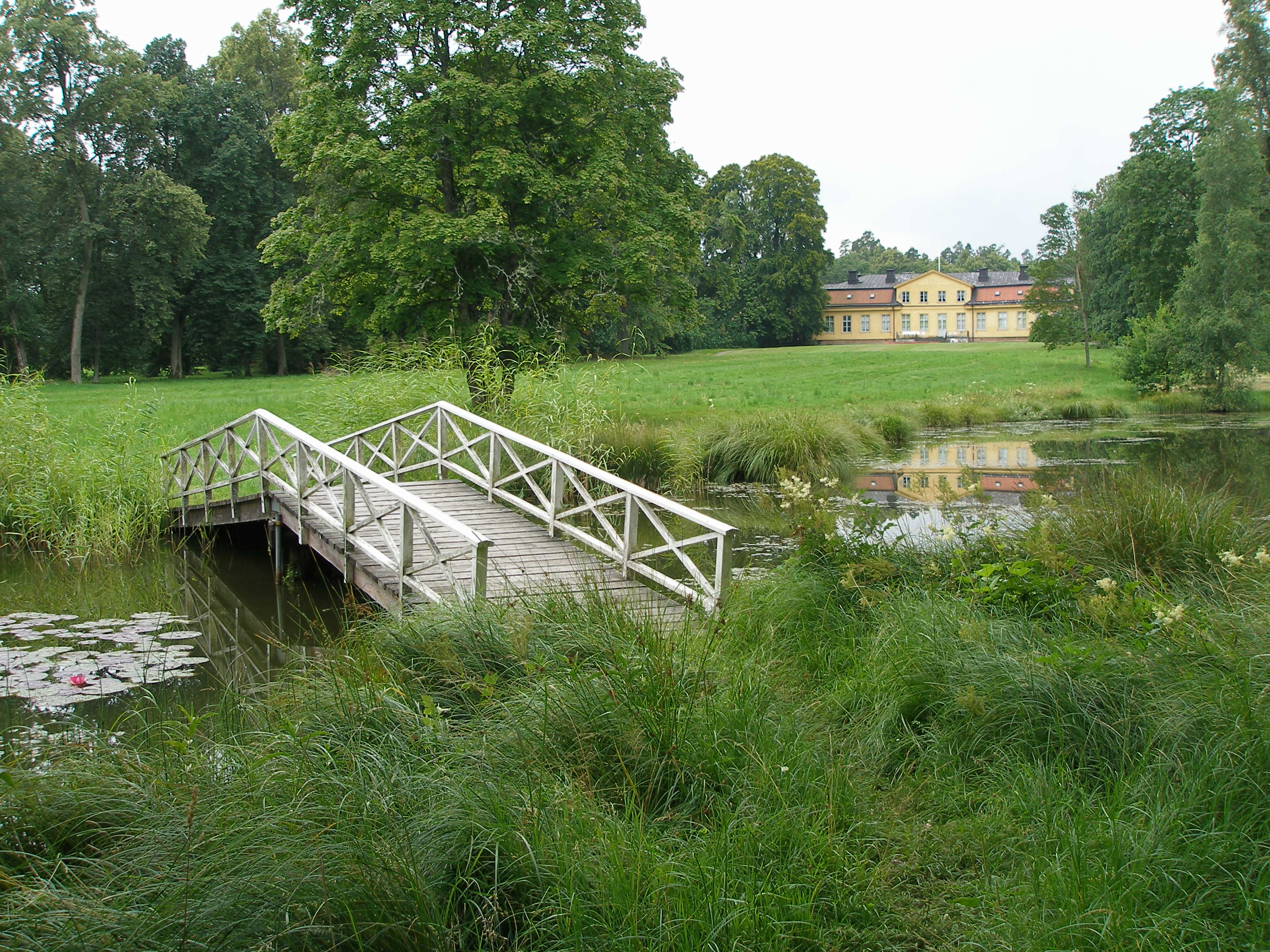
Lambohov manor

Lambohov is a Swedish city district in southwestern Linköping. It is also the name of the manor around which the district has evolved. The district grew in the 1980s and over 50% of the buildings were erected from 1981 to 1990. Initially it was characterized by a mix of different forms of housing, such as houses alternating with low apartment buildings. Lambohov currently has nearly 8,000 inhabitants.

It is customary to divide Lambohov into several parts. Eastern Lambohov seen as a fairly quiet area and contains a lot of houses. Western part as well, with houses and more expensive rental units. The southern part is the older rental properties and also some concrete buildings. In Lambohov Centre there is also a youth club. Lambohov is formally divided into the three parts Slestad, Änggården and Little Mjärdevi.

The municipality is planning new construction, and much has been built, in the eastern Lambohov.

Lambohov adjacent to the campus of Linköping University and Mjärdevi Science Park in the north. To the south is Slaka, to the parish of which the area belongs, and some distance to the east, the oak woodlands of the nature reserve Tinnerö is located.

In Lambohov, as a whole, has 30.1% (2009) of the population has foreign background and 21.5% (2009) are foreign born. The area is partially segregated, with few immigrants in residential areas and housing cooperatives. Of the immigrants, the majority are Assyrians, but there are also many people with roots from Iran and Somalia in the district. The proportion of people of immigrant origin have increased sharply since the area began to be developed in the 1990s.

The districts adjoining Lambohov are Jägarvallen, West Valla, Slaka and Djurgården.
