= Battle of Virserum =

Battle between rebels and Swedish troops

- Part of the Dacke War
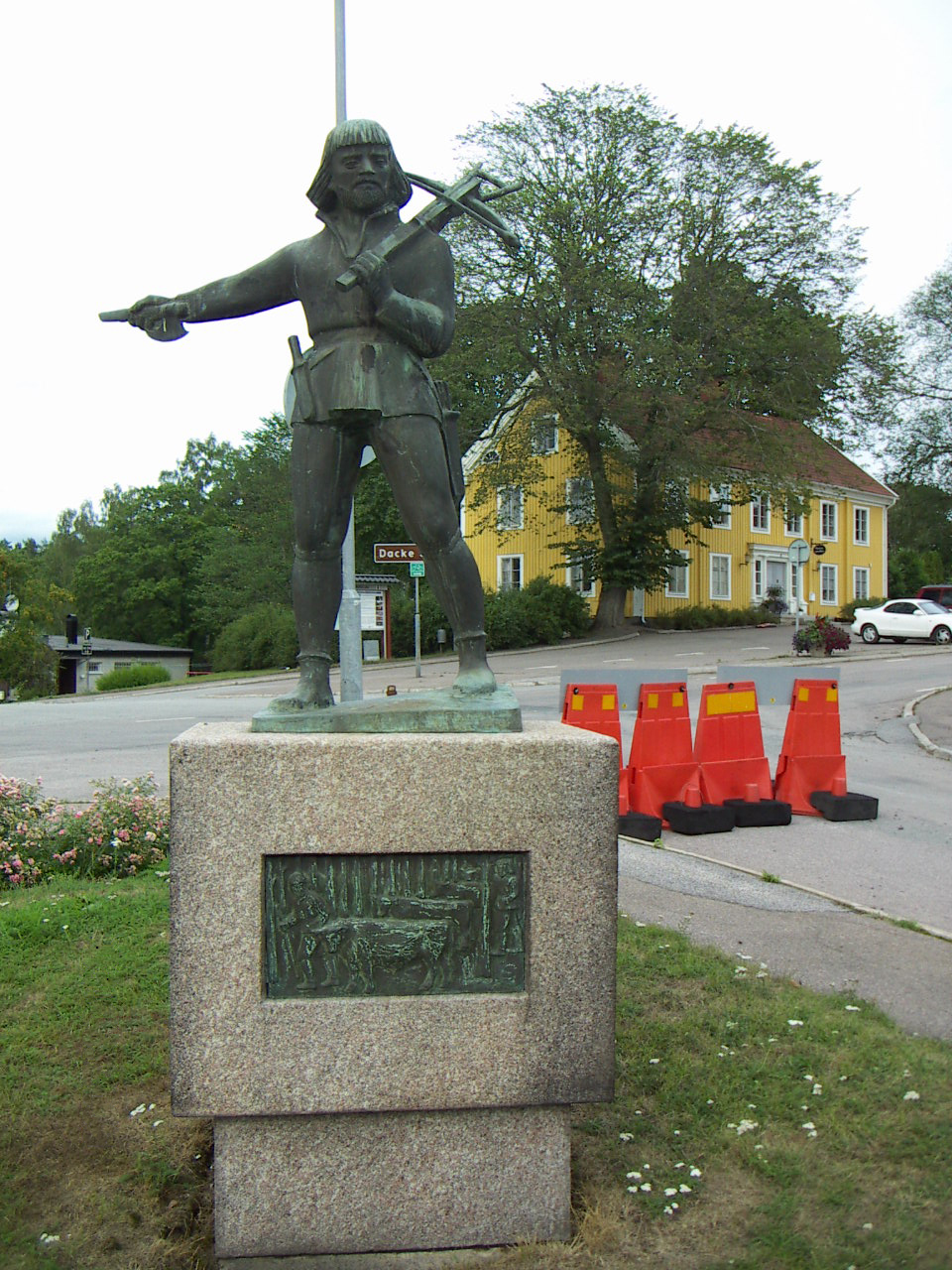
- Statue of Nils Dacke in Virserum
Date	20 March 1543
Location	Virserum, Småland
Result	Swedish victory
Territorial changes	Gustav Vasa retakes control of Småland

Belligerents
Sweden; Denmark–Norway	Rebels

Commanders and leaders
Lars Siggesson Sparre; Johan Turesson	Nils Dacke (WIA)

Strength
5,000	Unknown, but larger than the Swedish force

Casualties and losses
Heavy	500 killed

The Battle of Virserum, also called the Battle of Lake Hjorten was the final engagement between the royal troops of Gustav Vasa and the insurgent leader Nils Dacke during the Dacke War. An estimated 20,000 people took part in the fighting.

== Background ==
=== Reforms under Gustav Vasa ===
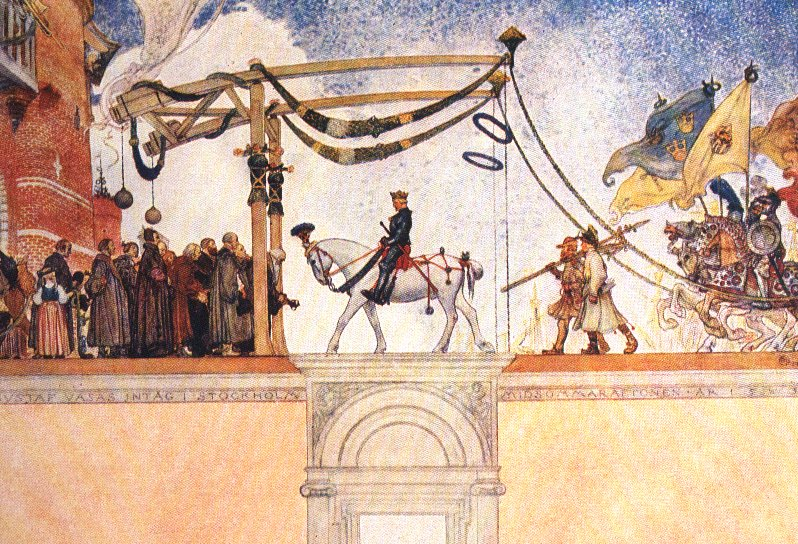
Entry of Gustav Vasa into Stockholm

After the Swedish War of Liberation against the Kalmar Union, Sweden had proclaimed itself as an independent state under Gustav Vasa. During the parliamentary meeting at Västerås in 1527, it was decided by Gustav Vasa that the state was to convert to Lutheranism, and in connection with this, he ordered the confiscation of the Church's silver. Gustav Vasa quickly came to like the advantages of the Protestant church, like how the King should be the head of a national church rather than the Pope, and that mass should be held in the national language, rather than in Latin.

Gustav's new reforms required high taxes, since he still needed to pay the Hanseatic League for their assistance in him gaining the throne. The population was put under high taxes, and trade restrictions were implemented. These reforms, made many peasants in Småland very doubtful and unsatisfied with Gustav Vasa's rule and the reformation, In Småland alone, 370kg of Silver was confiscated.

=== Beginning of the Dacke War ===
In midsummer of 1542, Nils Dacke, a group of outlaws and former peasants, who rallied around him in the forest, attacked three royal advocates near Södra More, who had been sent to districts around Kalmar to collect taxes. During the next few weeks, more of Gustav's royal advocates and stewards were attacked and killed. A ceasefire agreement was later signed after the disastrous defeat at Kisa.

=== Buildup ===
After the ceasefire after the Battle of Kisa, Nils Dacke and his rebels were in control of Småland and Öland, with partial support from Västergötland and Östergötland. Around Christmas 1542, Nils Dacke was able to rely on the support of 90,000 peasants, the area he ruled over received the name "Dackeland". While Nils Dacke was creating his political program in Småland, Gustav Vasa was very active and was working against him. He used the truce to his advantage, and began mobilizing troops from Europe, continued creating propaganda against Dacke and isolated Dackeland both politically and economically.

Furthermore, Gustav Vasa also attempted to mobilize troops from provinces like Dalarna, Gästriksland, and Finland.

== Battle ==
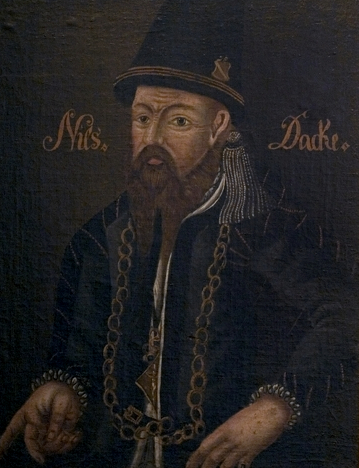
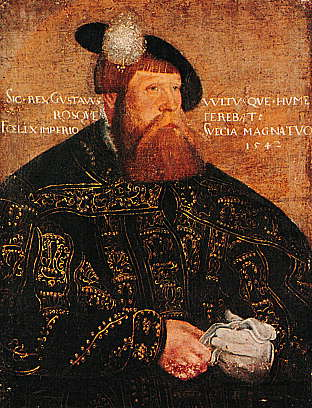
Nils Dacke on the left, and Gustav Vasa on the right.

When Gustav Vasa believed himself to be powerful enough to defeat Dacke, he broke the ceasefire agreement with Dacke in January and sent an army of 5,000 into Dackeland. The army was mostly composed of German mercenaries, but also included Danish support troops and Swedish national troops. When the Swedish army came to a wide isthmus by a large forest next to a lake, they were suddenly shot at by the rebels, which quickly evolved into a large firefight between hundreds of men, the smoke allowed the rebels to hide in the forest. In the confusion that followed, the Swedes started shooting each other.

Unprepared for this, the Swedish commander, Lars Siggesson Sparre, ordered the cavalry into the forest in an attempt to force the rebels to come out. The rebels spotted the cavalry and were about to counterattack when Nils Dacke was suddenly wounded in both of his legs. The cavalry finally reached the rebels and brutal fighting broke out, the confusion caused the rebels to run out onto the ice where they were killed by musket shots and cannons.

== Aftermath ==
The aftermath of the battle is hard on the rebels, they received a massive morale loss, with high losses. Their leader, Nils Dacke, was also wounded. It was no longer a possibility for a large army to be mobilized under his command.
