= Möre =

Small land in southern Sweden

Coordinates: 57°40′N 16°00′E

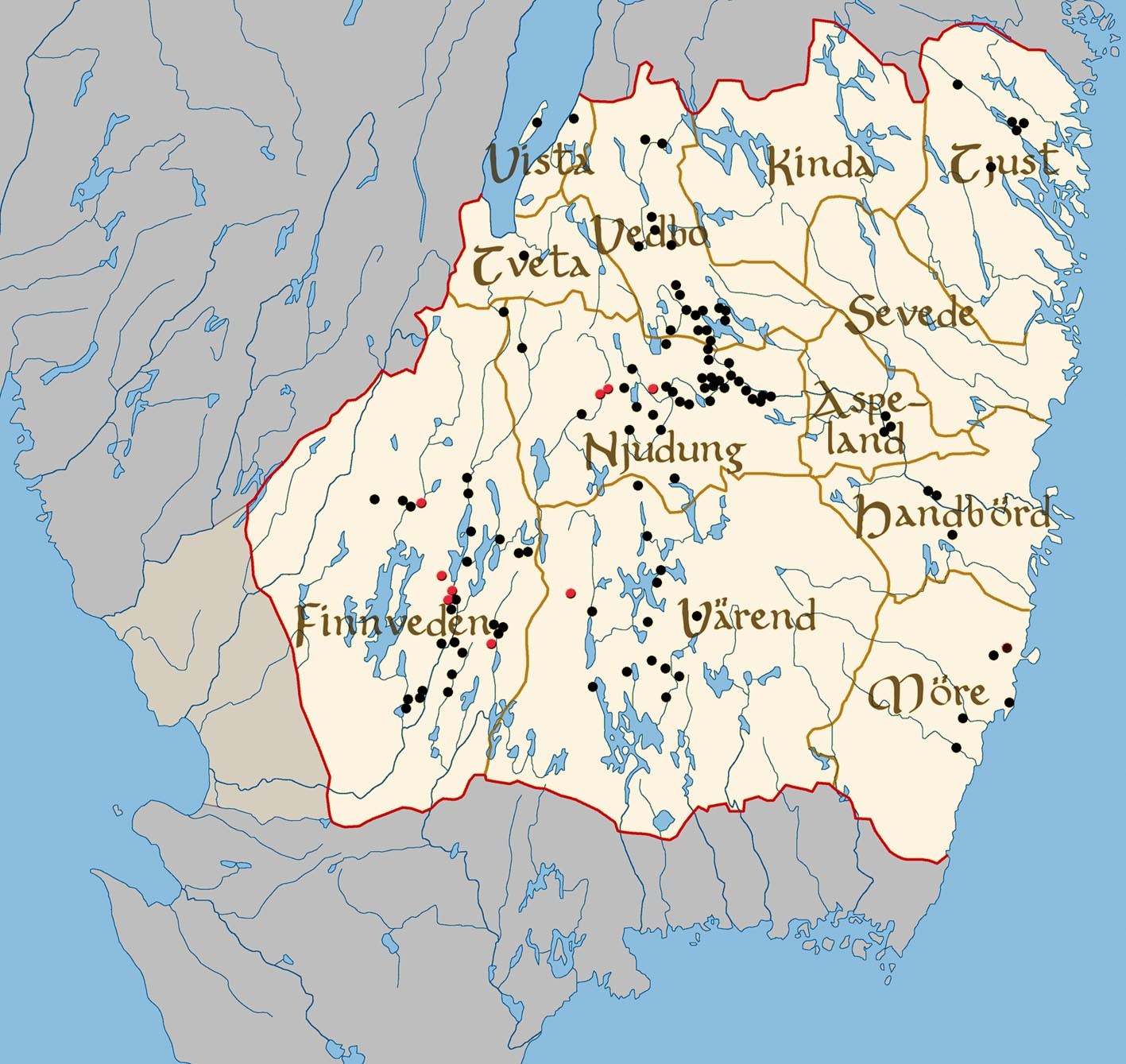
The small lands of Småland. The black and red spots indicate runestones. The red spots indicate runestones telling of long voyages.

Möre is one of the original small lands of Småland, a historical province (landskap) in southern Sweden. It corresponds to the south-eastern part of modern Kalmar County. Möre was divided into two hundreds: Möre Northern Hundred and Möre Southern Hundred.

== History ==
=== First millennium ===
Möre is mentioned c. 900, by Wulfstan of Hedeby as Meore:

Then, after the land of the Burgundians, we had on our left the lands that have been called from the earliest times Blekingey, and Meore, and Eowland, and Gotland, all which territory is subject to the Sweons; and Weonodland [the land of the Wends] was all the way on our right, as far as Weissel-mouth.

The mention is viewed as evidence that Möre was a well-known region. Traditionally, it has also been interpreted as evidence of 9th-century rule from the Mälaren Valley, but some modern historians instead opine that this did not imply centralised Swedish rule.

=== Second millennium ===
From the late 13th century and onwards, Möre was responsible for supporting Kalmar Castle. Legally, it was part of the jurisdiction of Östergötland, until 1559, when it was transferred to the newly formed jurisdiction of Småland.

Nils Dacke, main leader of the peasant side in the Dacke War against king Gustav Vasa, was born in Vissefjärda parish in Möre Southern Hundred around 1510. Dacke's initial rebellion sprung up in Möre and spread fast due to heavy taxation, forced Lutheran reformation of the church, royal seizures of church property and restrictions on trade with the then Danish Skåneland; it was eventually defeated by the king's army. Today, Nils Dacke is celebrated locally as a freedom fighter and a symbol of regionalism.

==== Möre uprising ====
The Möre uprising was a peasant uprising in Möre in 1536 led by Jon Andersson against the Swedish authorities. The uprising was suppressed the same year it occurred.

Möre was a fertile area, filled with self-aware peasants and crofters. It was a borderland where trade with Blekinge was important. On Möre’s coast lay Kalmar, but this royal outpost was almost isolated from the peasants of Möre. At Kalmar Castle, Swedish lords resided, whom the peasants rarely encountered. The peasants of Möre had a long tradition of self-governance and were glad to have as little as possible to do with the Swedes at Kalmar Castle. The increasingly frequent travels of the royal tax collectors through the region were trouble enough. In 1536, a high extra tax was imposed, leading to protests among peasants throughout Sweden, but in Möre, as in Konga, the peasants took up arms.

The foremost rebellion leader was named Jon Andersson. A free company under his command attacked and killed the bailiff Inge Arvidsson. Around the same time, the royal bailiff Jakob Skrifvare was beaten to death by the peasants in Torsås parish. In other parts of Möre, various acts of violence also took place, more or less spontaneous and uncoordinated. The king’s soldiers soon launched a counterattack, and no organized uprising broke out this time. A number of peasants were arrested when soldiers were sent out to the Möre region to restore order.

Some peasants were executed and hanged while others escaped with hefty fines. However, some of those involved could never be captured. They fled south. The peasant leader Jon Andersson escaped to Blekinge, where he later became a peaceful farmer, evidently more satisfied with the Danish taxes than the Swedish ones.

==== 17th century ====
In 1645, Möre Southern Hundred was given as a fief to Axel Oxenstierna.

== Bibliography ==
- Peterson, Gary Dean (2007-04-11). Warrior Kings of Sweden: The Rise of an Empire in the Sixteenth and Seventeenth Centuries. McFarland. ISBN 978-0-7864-2873-1.
- Larsson, Olle (2015-01-29). Smålands historia (in Swedish). Svenska Historiska Media Förlag AB. ISBN 978-91-87031-62-5.
- Adolfsson, Mats (2007). Fogdemakt och bondevrede: 1500–1718 [Bailiff power and peasant anger: 1500-1718] (in Swedish). Natur & Kultur. ISBN 9789127356900.
