= Göksholm =

Swedish castle

Coordinates: 59°16′01″N 15°33′15″E

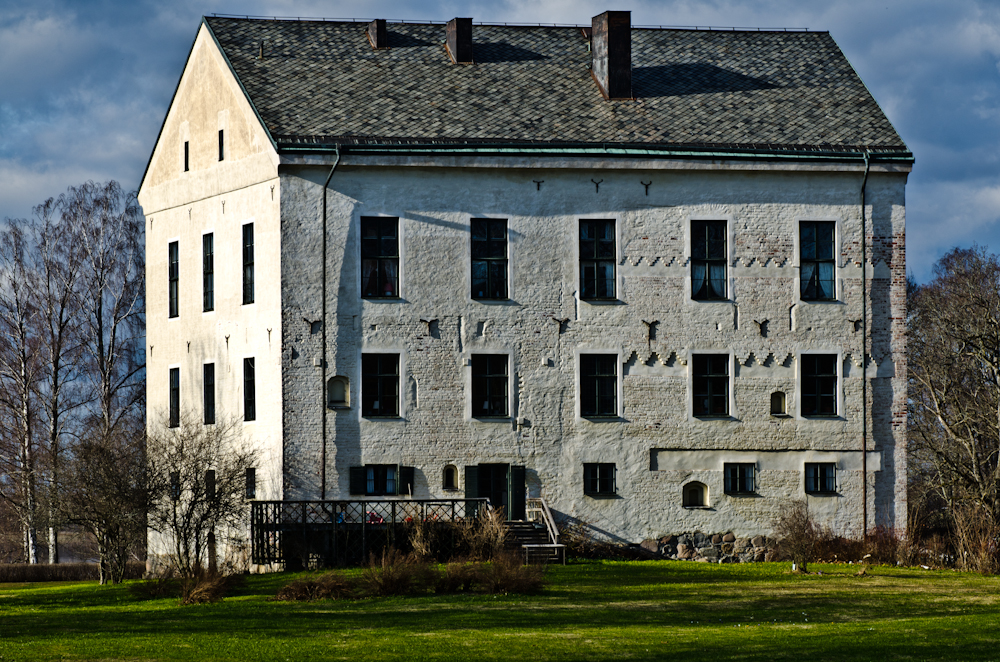
Göksholm

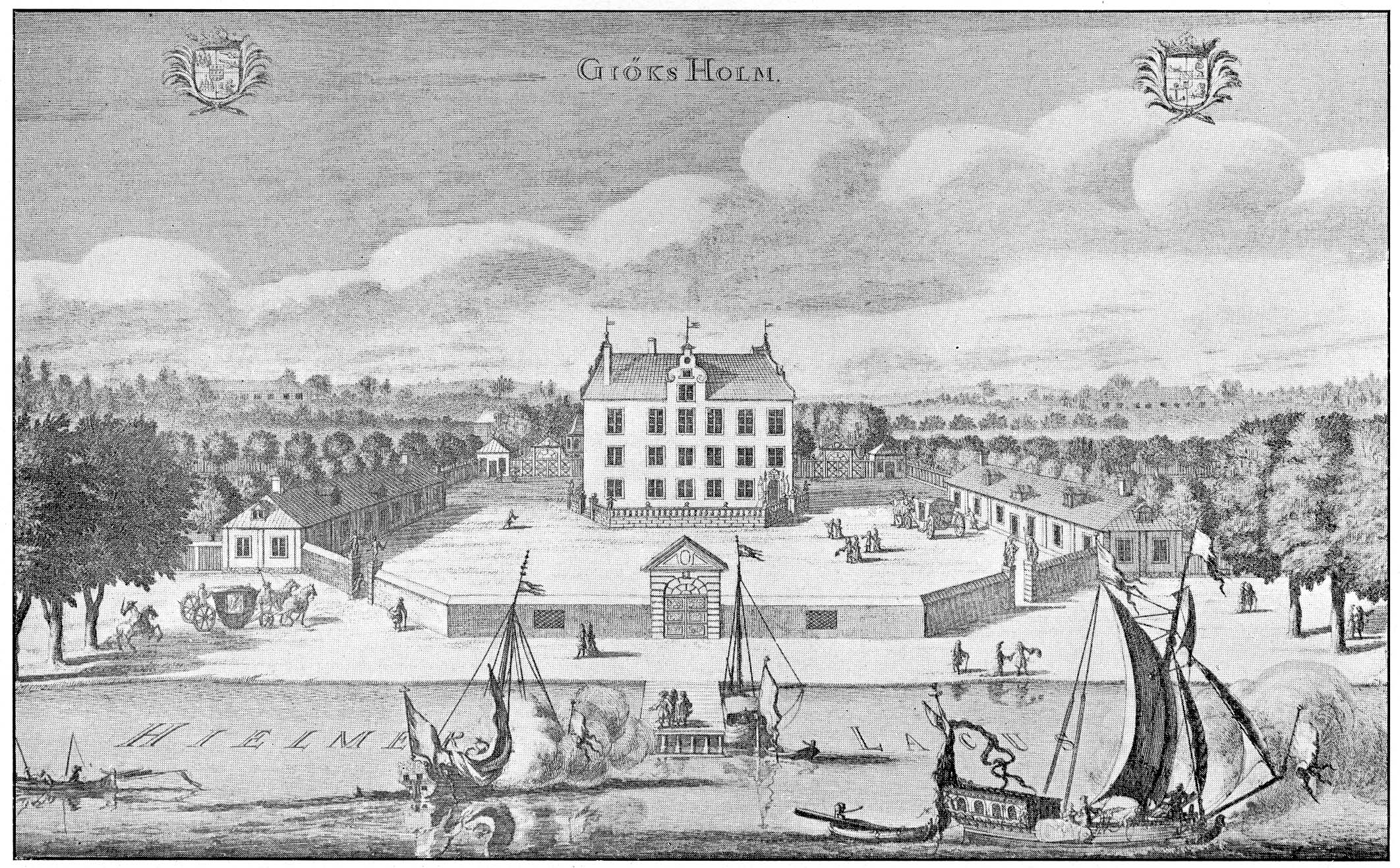
Göksholm castle as depicted by Erik Dahlbergh in Suecia Antiqua et Hodierna.

Göksholm (Swedish pronunciation: [ˈjœ̌kshɔlm]) is a medieval Swedish castle located on the southern beach of lake Hjälmaren. It is the oldest privately owned building in Sweden that has been continuously inhabited.

Göksholm's oldest parts can be dated to the 13th century. It is located in Stora Mellösa, Örebro Municipality.

Historically it is famous for the popular uprising's leader Engelbrekt Engelbrektsson, the then leader of the government (rikshövitsman), having been murdered on its lands in 1436 by Måns Bengtsson, the son and heir of the then owner of the castle.

== Architectural history ==
In the Middle Ages Göksholm was just a fortified castle with a large tower. Its oldest existent parts have been dated to the 13th century. It was built (rebuilt and enlarged) during the Middle Ages through six different stages.

After a fire at the end of the 16th century, the building was modernized according to that period's style, getting a more regular plan, bigger windows and details in the Dutch renaissance style. Despite the thorough renovation, the medieval base structure remains.

A painted inner ceiling from the time of this renaissance renovation exists with 121 cassettes which is remarkably well preserved today.

Under the 17th-century owners, Baron Knut Kurck and Baron Fleming, the castle was encrusted with portals, and circle-patterned outer buildings. Lars Gustaf Tersmeden had the ceiling renovated in 1801. This was the last big change in its structure. Some facade details were changed in the 1950s. At that time, a study of the building's architectural history was undertaken by Iwar Andersson which has been published as Göksholm — Från medeltida borg till nutida bostad (Kungliga Vitterhets Historie och Antikvitets Akademiens handlingar, Uppsala 1965).

== List of Lords ==
Göksholm castle has always been private property. It was built as a medieval fortress to protect its owners, in much the same way as several medieval castles in other parts of Europe.

The first attested owner of Göksholm's castle was Lady Ingeborg Ulfsdotter (mentioned 1296, died before 1307), of the family of Ulv (a cadet branch of the earl dynasty that later became known as the Folkunge royal line, or House of Bjälbo). (She had possibly received it as her dower from her first husband, Lord Knut Mattsson of the family of Lejonbjälke, who was lawspeaker of Närke, the province where the castle is located.) Göksholm was then passed down through four female generations. Great-great-granddaughter Lady Christina Magnusdotter brought it to her husband, Lord Bengt Stensson of the Ringhult lordship (the family later dubbed Natt och Dag). The couple's son was the above-mentioned killer, Lord Måns.

- Ingeborg Ulfsdotter (of the Ulv), widow of Knut Mattsson and wife of Abjörn Sixtensson of Salsta and Engsoe
- Birgitta Knutsdotter (of the Lejonbjälke), wife of 1) Barnam? 2) Magnus Bengtsson
- Katarina Magnusdotter, wife of Lidinvard Haraldsson
- Margareta Lidinvardsdotter, wife of Magnus Håkansson
- Christina Magnusdotter
  - and her husband: Bengt Stensson (Natt och Dag), chevalier, Royal Councillor, lawspeaker
- Magnus (Måns) Bengtsson (Natt och Dag), chevalier, Royal Councillor, lawspeaker
- Johan Månsson (Natt och Dag), chevalier, Royal Councillor
- Åke Johansson (Natt och Dag), chevalier, Royal Councillor, lawspeaker
- Johan Åkesson (Natt och Dag), Royal Councillor
- Axel Johansson (Natt och Dag)
- Åke Axelsson Natt och Dag, 1st baron, Royal Councillor, Lord High Constable of Sweden, lawspeaker
- baroness Barbro Åkesdotter Natt och Dag, died 1680, married 1) Klas Bielkenstierna, admiral and Royal Councillor 2) baron Knut Kurck, Royal Councillor, lawspeaker
- 1680-1703: Charlotta Bielkenstierna, granddaughter of baroness Barbro, married baron Johan Kasimir Fleming af Liebelitz, treasury councillor
- 1703-1747: baron Axel Johan Fleming af Liebelitz
- 1747-1754: baron Carl Sparre (1676–1754), major general
- 1754-1794 (?): baroness Beata Sparre (1734–87), married count Adam Otto Lagerberg (1723–98), provincial governor of Skaraborg county
- 1794 (?)-1799: count Karl Lagerberg, captain
- 1799-1817: Lars Gustaf Tersmeden, captain
- 1817-1822 (?): baron Gotthard Mauritz von Rehausen, Minister plenipotentiary in London
- 1822 (?)- 1852: baron Johan Gotthard von Rehausen, minister plenipotentiary in London
- 1852-1890: Malvina Harriet von Rehausen, widow of baron Samuel Abraham Leijonhufvud, president
- 1890-1914: baroness Emma Leijonhufvud, married Gustaf Nyrén, komminister
- 1914-1999 (?) : baron Tage Leijonhufvud, cavalry officer
- 1999 (?) - : baron Erik Leijonhufvud

There is an old list of castle owners, written in 1801 on the basis of a painted fris from 1676 which has since disappeared. It says that it contains all owners "who can be attested by written sources" throughout the period of c 1320–1676. That list says:

- Bo Nilsson (Natt och Dag) (incorrect attribution of ownership)
- Bo Bosson (Natt och Dag) (incorrect attribution of ownership)
- Sten Bosson (Natt och Dag) (incorrect attribution of ownership)
- Bengt Stensson (Natt och Dag)
- Magnus Bengtsson (Natt och Dag)
- Johan Månsson (Natt och Dag)
- Åke Johansson (Natt och Dag)
- Johan Åkesson (Natt och Dag)
- Axel Johansson (Natt och Dag)
- Åke Axelsson (Natt och Dag)
- Barbro Åkesdotter (Natt och Dag), husbands 1) Klas Bjelkenstierna 2) Knut Kurck

It is therefore incorrect as to the three first names. It appears obvious that medieval sources were not checked and that the male line had been extrapolated back from Bengt Stensson.
