= Engelbrekt Engelbrektsson =

Swedish nobleman and nationalist rebel leader (1390s – 1436)

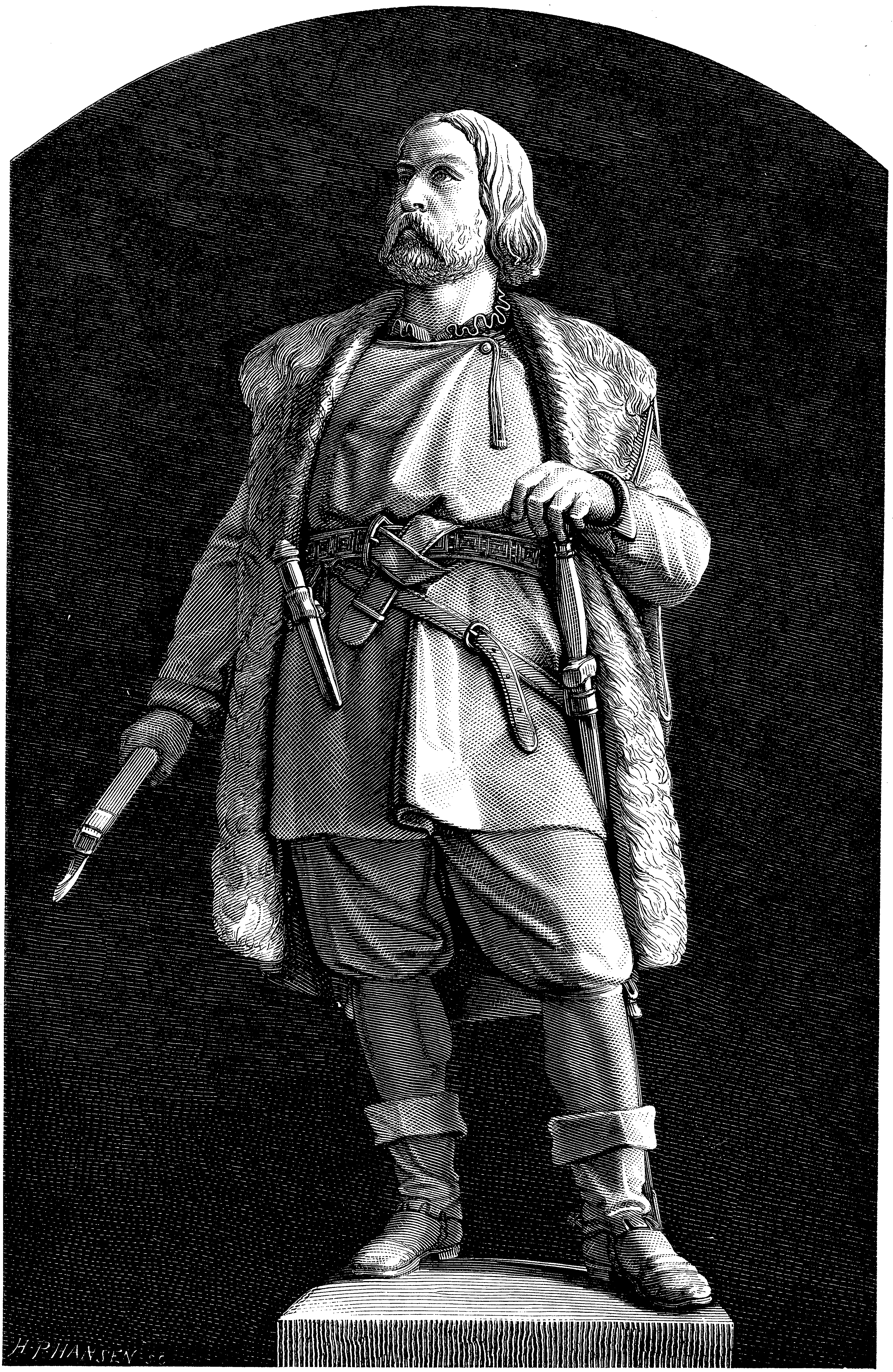
Model for a statue of Engelbrekt in Örebro

Engelbrekt Engelbrektsson (1390s – 4 May 1436) was a Swedish nobleman, rebel leader and military leader of German ancestry. He was the leader of the Engelbrekt rebellion in 1434 against Eric of Pomerania, king of the Kalmar Union.

== Biography ==
Engelbrekt Engelbrektsson was the owner of a mine and ironworks in the historic mining region of Bergslagen. He was from the parish of Norberg (Norbergs socken) in Västmanland. His family originally came from Germany, having migrated to Sweden in the 1360s. The family coat of arms shows three half-lilies formed into a triangle.

Engelbrekt was dissatisfied by the numerous offences of the Danish local bailiffs and heavy taxation. In 1434 he started a rebellion with the support of mine workers and peasants from his home area. The background was the widespread discontent against the king's bailiff in Västerås, Jösse Eriksson, who was blamed for the distress that mining men suffered under his rule. Following formal complaints made by Engelbrekt on the behalf of the mining men an inquiry was made by Erik of Pomerania which eventually found that Jösse's actions were criminal. Despite this Jösse was not replaced which led to a large host of peasants going to Västerås to protest. While the Riksråd intervened to peacefully resolve the protests, no actions were taken against the bailiff. In the spring of 1433 the protests escalated into violence and Dalecarlians besieged the bailiff's castle. The Riksråd fired Jösse and replaced him with Hans von Eberstein. However, Engelbrekt was not satisfied since Jösse had not been prosecuted for his admitted crimes. A host of dalecarlians and västmanlanders destroyed the castles of Borganäs and Köpingshus. At this point, many nobles joined the rebels. The rebellion grew into a massive force sweeping the country. The uprising took place against the background of the Kalmar Union.

In 1435 Engelbrekt was appointed Rikshövitsman, Commander in chief, at a Riksdag in Arboga that is often considered the first Riksdag in Sweden. However, he was not able to withstand the Swedish nobility, who wanted to exploit the rebellion. He was somewhat forced into the background. The nobility and clergy decided to support Karl Knutsson Bonde, who in 1436 supplanted Engelbrekt as Rikshövitsman. Jösse Eriksson returned to Sweden the same year, but was lynched by peasants in Motala after presenting him to the local thing who condemned him to death.

== Death ==
On 4 May 1436 Engelbrekt was murdered at Engelbrektsholmen, an islet in Lake Hjälmaren, by the aristocrat Måns Bengtsson of the Natt och Dag family of nobles; he lived in nearby Göksholm Castle. His father had been involved in a legal dispute with Engelbrekt regarding an illegal burning of a ship. The killing is considered by some historians to have been an assassination. Engelbrekt was buried in Örebro at Saint Nicholas Church.

== Aftermath ==
Over the next few decades Engelbrekt became a national hero, depicted as a public protector and an opponent of the Kalmar Union. His rebellion came to be seen as the start of the Swedish national awakening, which would triumph in the following century with the victory of King Gustav Vasa (reigned 1523–1560). Engelbrekt himself had no such ideas, which must have been anachronistic at the time; however his rebellion gave peasants a voice in Swedish politics which they never lost afterwards. The Engelbrekt rebellion caused the unity of the Kalmar Union to erode, leading to the expulsion of Danish forces from Sweden. Although later Danish kings regained influence over Sweden, the rebellion had set a precedent for Swedish claims to sovereignty.

== Legacy ==
- A bronze statue representing Engelbrekt by Swedish sculptor Carl Gustaf Qvarnström was unveiled in Örebro in 1865.
- A statue of Engelbrekt is atop a pillar located outside of Stockholm City Hall.
- Carl Georg Starbäck published the novel Engelbrekt Engelbrektsson in two parts in 1868–69.
- Gustaf Wilhelm Gumælius published the poem Engelbrekt in 1858.
- August Strindberg included Engelbrekt in the 1899 five-act play Saga of the Folkungs (Folkungasagan).
- Engelbrekt became the subject of Engelbrekt (1928), an opera by the Swedish composer Natanael Berg (1879–1957).
- Engelbrekt Parish and Engelbrekt Church in the Diocese of Stockholm are named in his honor.
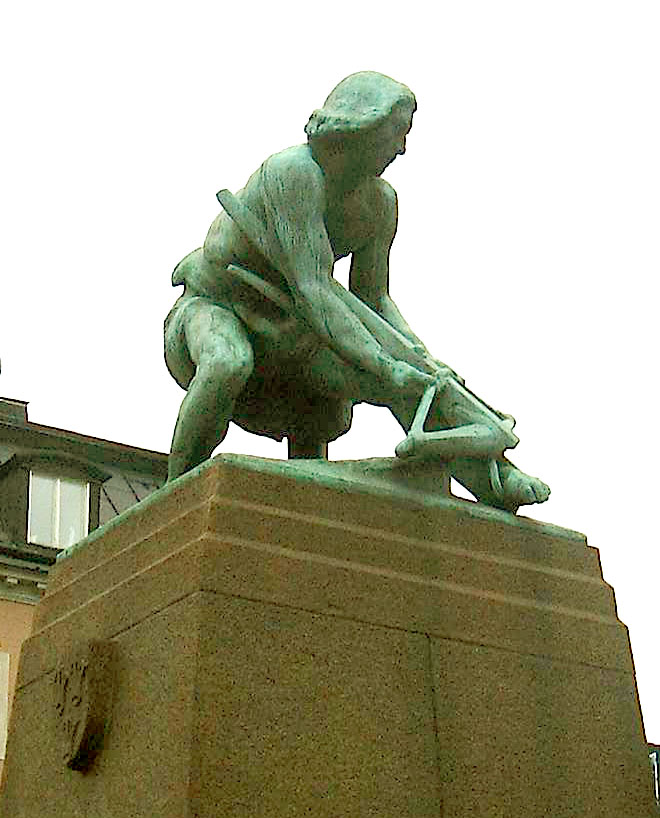
Engelbrekt Statue at Kornhamnstorg in Stockholm

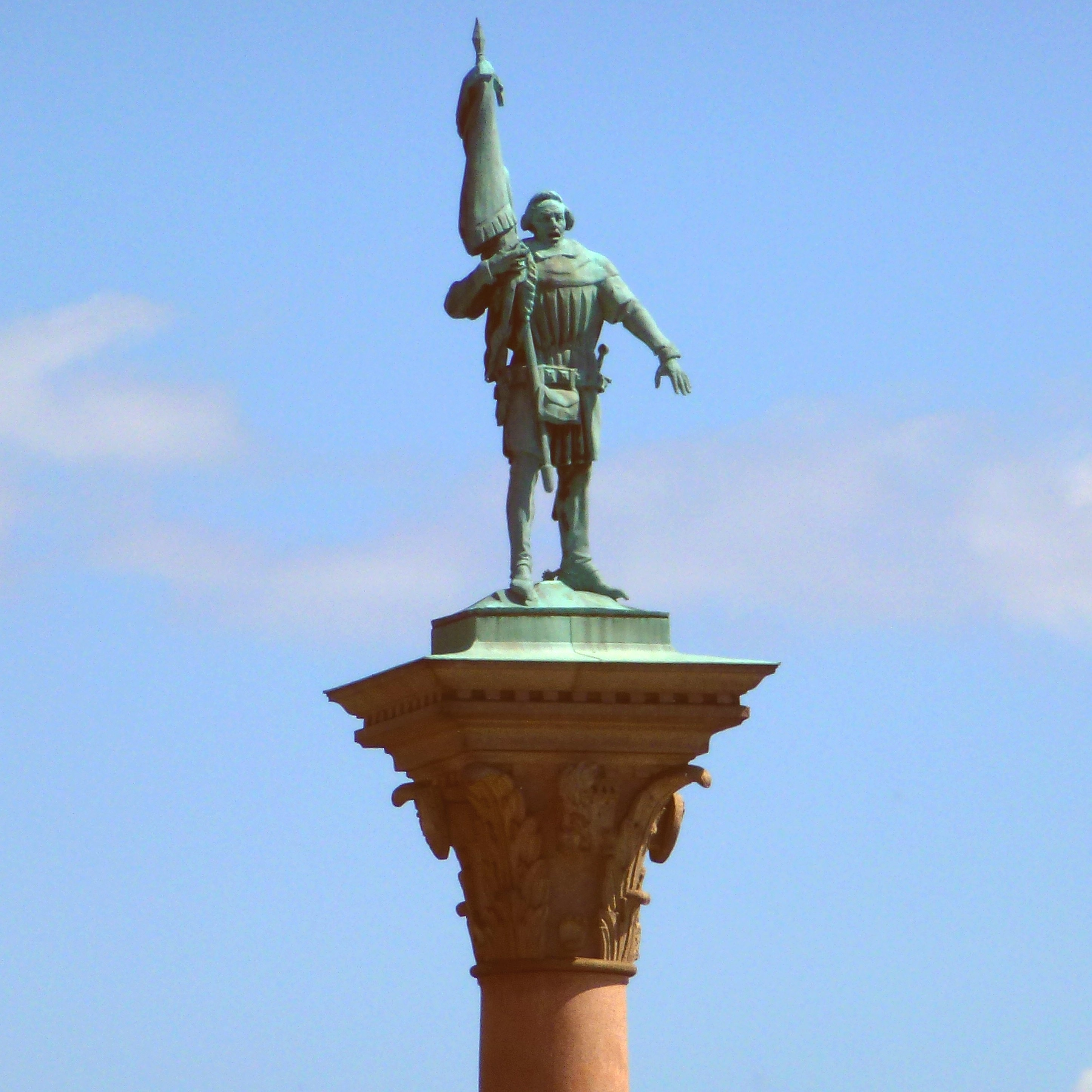
Engelbrekt statue at Stockholm City Hall

== In popular culture ==
In his 2023 historical novel Ödet och hoppet Niklas Natt och Dag suggests that Engelbrekt was killed in a spur-of-the-moment lover's spat with his assassin Måns Bengtsson (the author's ancestor).

== Other sources ==
- Harrison, Dick (2002) Sveriges historia medeltiden (Stockholm: Liber) ISBN 91-47-05115-9
- Moberg, Vilhelm (1971) Min svenska historia, II. Från Engelbrekt till och med Dacke (Stockholm: Norstedt)
- Larsson, Lars Olof (1984) Engelbrekt Engelbrektsson och 1430-talets svenska uppror (P.A. Norstedt) ISBN 978-91-1-843212-5
- Lindkvist, Thomas (1990) Sveriges medeltid (Solna: Almqvist & Wiksell) ISBN 978-91-21-10557-3
- Lönnroth, Erik (1961) Från svensk medeltid (Stockholm: Aldus/Bonniers)
