= Djurgården (disambiguation) =

Djurgården may refer to:

- Djurgården, a recreation park area and pleasure ground in Stockholm, Sweden
- Djurgården, Linköping, a district of Linköping
- Eläintarha (Swedish: Djurgården), a large park in Helsinki, Finland
- Djurgårdens IF, a Swedish sports club
  - Djurgårdens IF Dam - Women's soccer club
