= Svante Sture =

Svante Sture may refer to:

- Svante Nilsson (regent of Sweden) (Svante Nilsson Sture, 1460–1512)
- Svante Stensson Sture (Svante Sture the Younger, 1517–1567), Swedish count, statesman and riksmarsk.
