= Battle of Haddorp =

Battle between rebels and Swedish troops

- Part of the Dacke War
Date	12 October 1542
Location	Haddorp, Östergötland
Result	Swedish victory
Territorial changes	Haddorp is razed

Belligerents
Sweden	Rebels

Commanders and leaders
Botvid Larsson; Abraham Eriksson	Unknown †

Strength
Unknown	300 soldiers

Casualties and losses
Unknown	300 killed

The Battle of Haddorp, also known as the Massacre in Haddorp was a surprise attack led by royal troops under the command of Botvid Larsson and Abraham Eriksson on a rebel camp in the village of Haddorp, Sweden.

== Background ==
In September, Swedish troops suffered a heavy defeat in the Battle of Kisa: troops under Dacke blocked the road with fallen trees, leaving both sides of the road impassable. On mountains beside the road there appeared rebels under Dacke, who began firing arrows from bows and crossbows, and bullets from hand cannons, at the royal troops. Only remnants of the 1,200 strong army managed to escape the barrage.

The defeat caused a general uprising in northern Småland to break out, and shortly afterwards the peasants in Östergötland did the same. After the Battle of Kisa, Dacke's forces were marching towards Linköping. They set up camp in the parishes of Skeda and Slaka with 300 men and were to stay with the farmer Olof Håkansson overnight.

== Battle ==
On 12 October, royal troops from Linköping were sent towards the rebel camp, and early in the morning, the royal troops under the command of Botvid Larsson and Abraham Eriksson surprised the sleeping rebels and attacked them. The royal troops set fire to houses and barns, and Dacke's men were beaten and shot. It is said that all 300 died. The entirety of Haddorp was burned down.

== Aftermath ==
Despite the defeat, the uprising remained in Dacke's favour, and the remaining rebels were later reinforced with considerable forces by Nils Dacke
