= Sigrid Sture =

Swedish noblewoman and governor (1538–1613)

Sigrid Svantesdotter Sture (13 December 1538, Mörkö, Södermanland – 16 March 1613), was a Swedish noble who served as governor (häradshövding) of Stranda Hundred from 1577 to 1613.

She was a daughter of Svante Stensson Sture and Märta ("king Martha") Erikdotter Leijonhufvud, thereby a niece of queen Margaret Leijonhufvud and a granddaughter of regent Christina Gyllenstierna. She married Ture Pedersson Bielke and became the mother of Svante Turesson Bielke. After the death of her husband in 1577, she succeeded him as royal governor of Stranda hundred. This was an unusual position for a person of her gender in 16th century Sweden, and one she kept until her death over 30 years later. She was, however, not allowed to rule formally, but was forced to appoint male proxies to officially rule in her place.

Sture is also known for her writing, and authored an autobiographical poem.

== Sources ==
- PLF-Nytt. January 2005. Nr 72
- Det medeltida Sverige (DMS)
- Sigrid Sture at Svenskt kvinnobiografiskt lexikon
