= Natt och Dag =

Swedish noble family

Natt och Dag Sture
- Coat of arms of the Natt och Dag family
- Country: Sweden
- Origin: Contrasting colours of its Coat of Arms
- Founded: 1200s
- Founder: Nils Sigridsson (Natt och Dag)

The Natt och Dag (Swedish: [ˈnatː ɔ ˈdɑːɡ]; lit. 'Night and day') is a Swedish noble family and the oldest surviving family of pure Swedish extraction, with origins stretching back at least as far as the late thirteenth century. However, the actual name Natt och Dag, alluding to the contrasting colours of its coat of arms, was not coined until the sixteenth century, and was not used as a surname by the family itself until the eighteenth century It is therefore customary to write the name in parentheses (e.g. Bengt Stensson (Natt och Dag)) when applying it to individuals prior to 1700.

== History ==
The family's oldest known ancestor is the knight, Lawspeaker of Värend, and Councillor of the Realm Nils Sigridsson (Natt och Dag), who is first attested in a document from 11 May 1280 and lived at Ringshult, near Torpa in Östergötland.

It is possible the family's origins stretch even further back. Gabriel Anrep, a Swedish genealogist, wrote in 1862:

That this family stems from Sigtrygg, a rich man, who, according to Sturlesson, in the year 1030 lived in Nerike and, during the winter, housed the Norwegian King Olaf Haraldsson the Holy, and that Sigtrygg's son Ivar thereafter became a distinguished man, may be true but lacks evidence.

In the fifteenth century, the family split into two branches. The junior branch, descended from Bo Stensson (Natt och Dag), adopted the surname Sture, although they continued to bear the Natt och Dag coat of arms, and thus are sometimes considered either as an offshoot of the Natt och Dag or as a separate dynasty, the Younger Sture Family. The Younger Stures enjoyed great prominence in the late fifteenth and sixteenth centuries. Svante Nilsson and his son Sten Sture the Younger ruled Sweden as regents (Swedish: riksföreståndare) during the period 1503-20, and Sten's sons Nils Stensson Sture and Svante Stensson Sture, and the latter's son Nils Svantesson Sture, were all important figures in Swedish politics during the reigns of Kings Gustav I and Erik XIV. This branch became extinct with the death of Svante Mauritzson Sture in 1616.

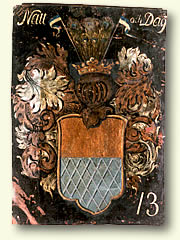
Natt och Dag arms in Riddarhuset, Stockholm, from 1652

The senior branch of the family was descended from Bo Stensson's elder brother, Bengt Stensson (Natt och Dag), who was a knight, Lawspeaker of Närke and Councillor of the Realm, and died circa 1450.

The family again split in two after Bengt Stensson's grandson Johan Månsson (Natt och Dag), with one line descending from Johan's elder son Måns Johansson and the other from his younger son Åke Johansson. Åke's great-grandson and namesake Åke Axelsson (Natt och Dag) lived 1594-1655. He served as a Councillor of the Realm and also as Marshal of the Realm, and on 20 April 1652 he was ennobled by Queen Christina. With this the Natt och Dag were formally inducted into the Swedish nobility, and their coat of arms was added to the Riddarhus; however, this line died out in 1666 with Åke's grandson Carl Axelsson (Natt och Dag).

The other line descended from Måns Johansson produced a number of military officers in the seventeenth and eighteenth centuries, during Sweden's Great Power Era, and in more recent times the prominent governmental official Åke Natt och Dag and the writer Niklas Natt och Dag. This branch of the family survives to the present day.

One branch of the family resides in the United States, particularly the states of Alaska, Washington and Kansas, using the truncated surname Dagg.

== Coat of arms ==
- Shield: Parti per fess Or and Azure.
- Helm: Six peacock feathers between two colours.

The Natt och Dag coat of arms are canting arms, as the Or and Azure colours represent day and night, respectively.

== Noted members ==
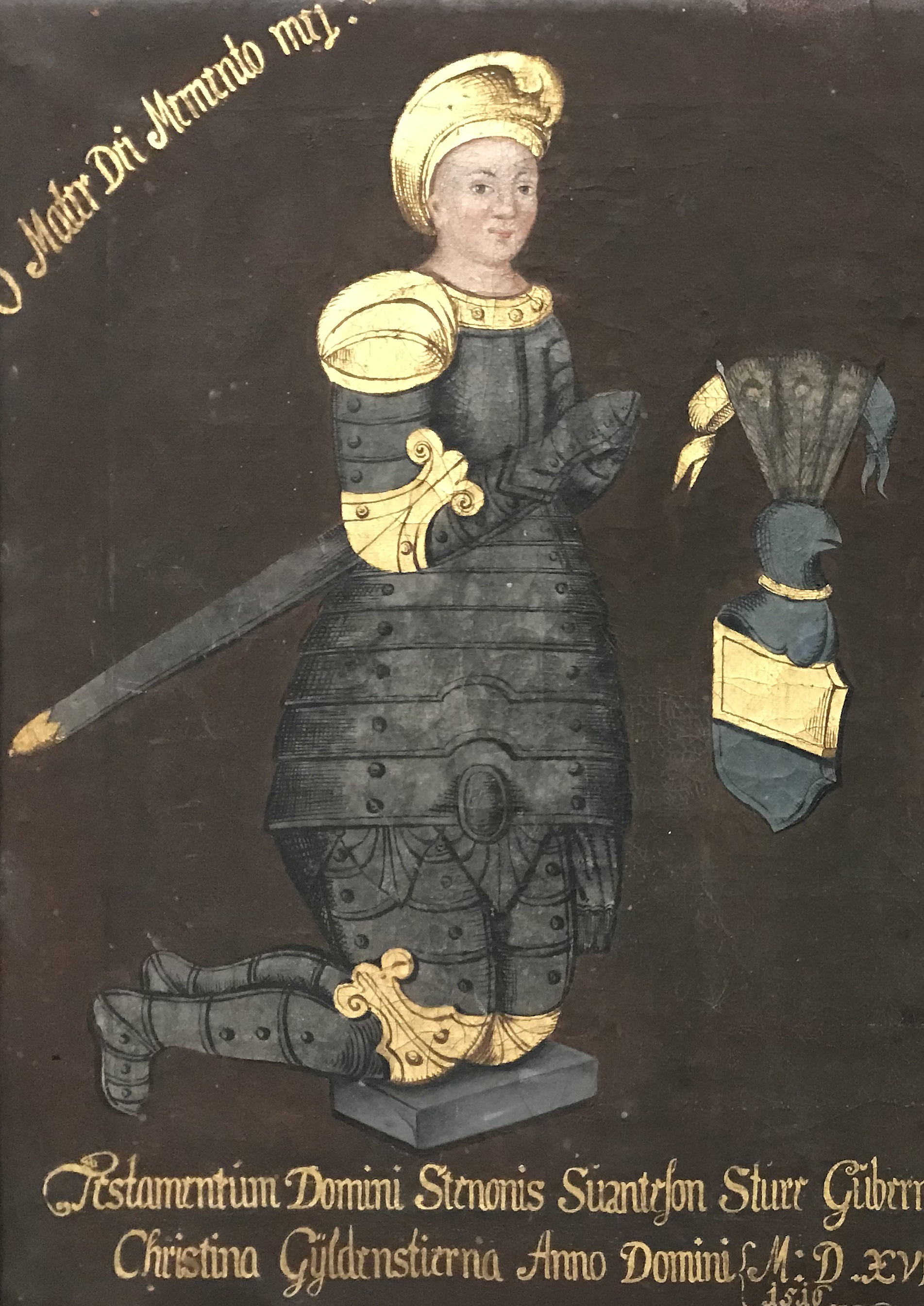
Sten (Stenonis) Sture the Younger

=== Main Branch ===
- Måns Johansson, resided at Ringshult at the shores of Sommen. During the Dacke War he sided with Gustav Vasa despite having a difficult relation towards him. He was put in charge of an army to suppress the rebellion.
- Johan Månsson (Natt och Dag), executed in Stockholm Bloodbath.
- Måns Bengtsson (Natt och Dag), killed Engelbrekt Engelbrektsson.
- Christina Natt och Dag, foster mother of queen Christina.
- Åke Natt och Dag
- Gösta Natt Och Dag (later Dagg)
- Åke Natt och Dag
- Niklas Natt och Dag, Swedish writer

=== Younger Sture Branch ===
- Nils Bosson Sture
- Svante Nilsson
- Sten Sture the Younger
- Nils Stensson Sture
- Svante Stensson Sture
- Nils Svantesson Sture

== Sources ==
This article is partially based on material from Nordisk familjebok, 1913.
