= Bösebo =

Village in Hultsfred Municipality, Kalmar County, Småland, Sweden

Coordinates: 57°17′13.8″N 15°42′2.4″E

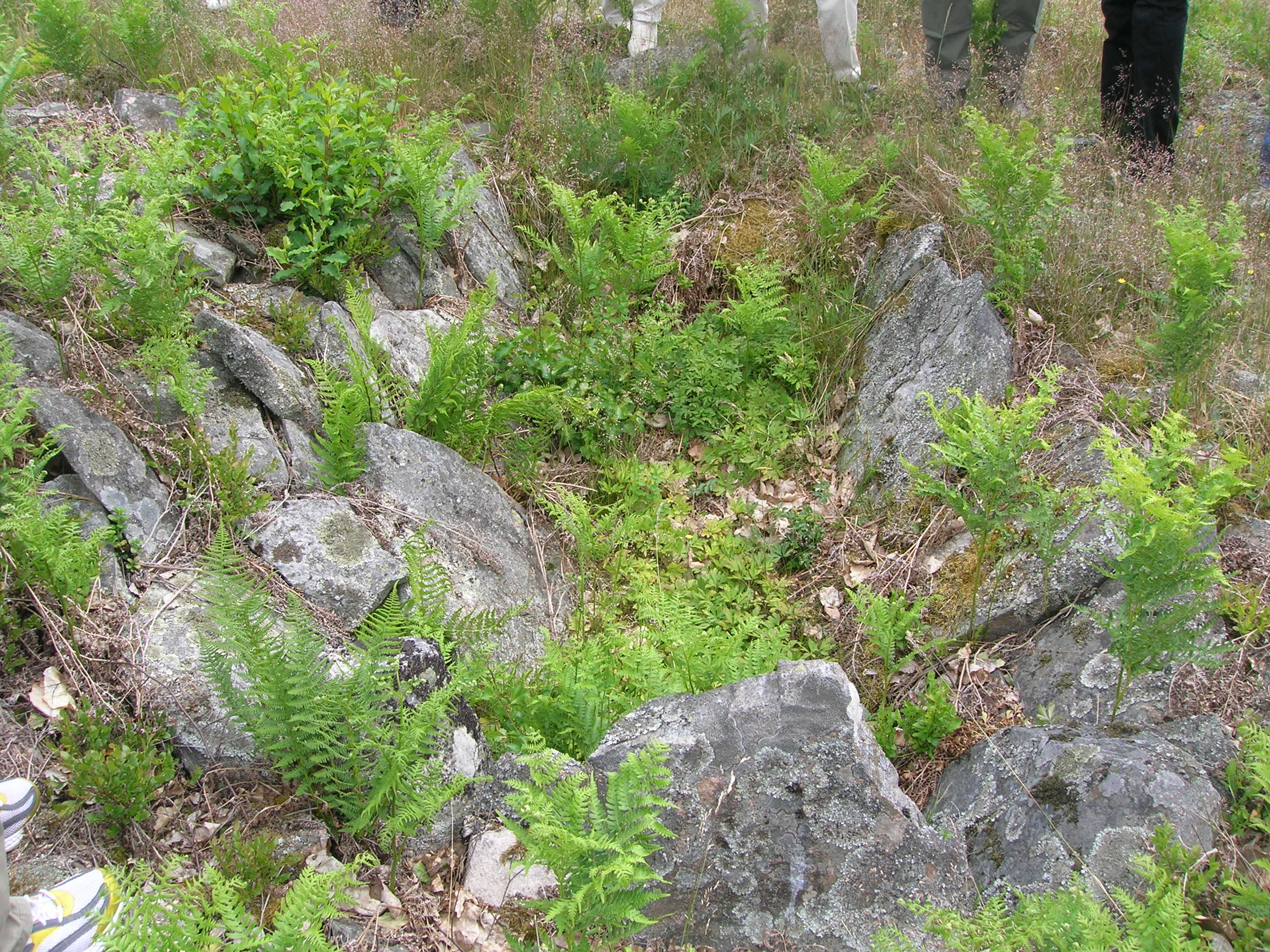
Bösebo, Sweden

Bösebo is a village placed 10 km east of Virserum in Hultsfred Municipality, Kalmar County, Småland, Sweden. It is placed where the three roads from Virserum, Mörlunda and Fågelfors are crossing. Bösebo is old, and there are marks of a settlement 2500 B.C. In the area around the village, Stone Age graves and stone cists have been found.
