= Niklas Natt och Dag =

Swedish writer and aristocrat

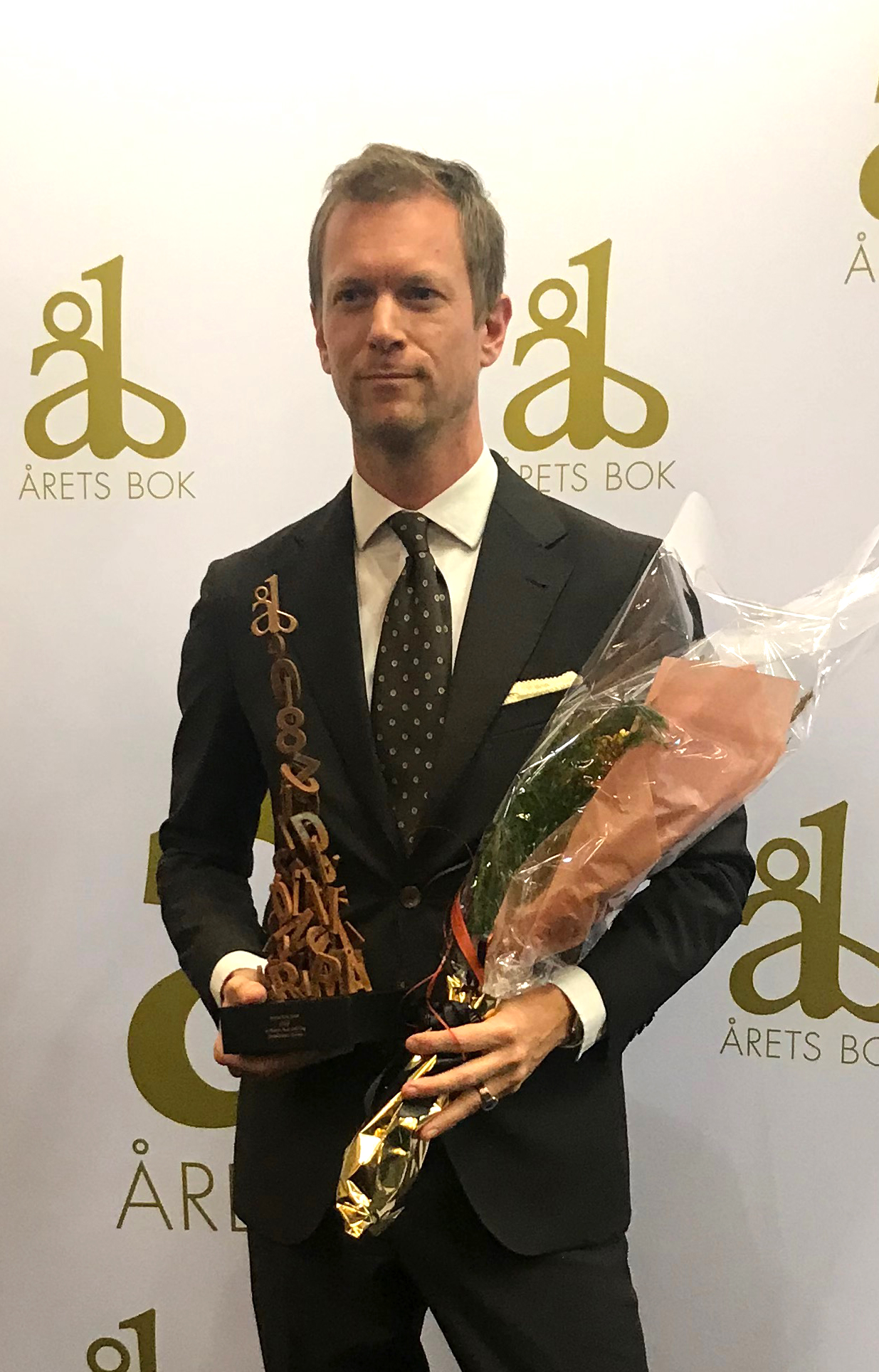
- Natt och Dag in 2018
- Born: Niklas Carl Bosson Natt och Dag; 3 October 1979 (age 46); Stockholm, Sweden
- Occupation: Novelist
- Writing career
- Language: Swedish
- Genres: Crime fiction, horror fiction, mystery fiction, historical fiction
- Subjects: Crime, thriller, mystery
- Notable work: Bellman noir (Jean Mickel Cardell) series
- Notable awards: 2018 Book of the Year by Bonniers Bokklubb

Niklas Carl Bosson Natt och Dag (born 3 October 1979, in Stockholm) is a Swedish novelist. He debuted with the acclaimed historical detective novel The Wolf and the Watchman, the first part of the Bellman noir (Jean Mickel Cardell) trilogy, followed by The City Between the Bridges and The Order of the Furies.

== Career ==
Born to the Natt och Dag Swedish noble family, from 2000 until 2003 Niklas studied in Kalmar, Sweden. Between October 2006 and October 2008, he worked as the editor-in-chief of the Slitz magazine, after which he switched to freelance work.

He made his book debut in 2017 with The Wolf and the Watchman (original title: 1793), the first part of the Bellman noir (Jean Mickel Cardell) trilogy, also known as Winge und Cardell ermitteln in German-speaking countries. The book was named the "Best Swedish debut of 2017" by the Swedish Crime Writers' Academy. At the 2018 Gothenburg Book Fair the novel was additionally awarded the Crimetime Specsavers Award for the best detective debut, as well as voted the Book of the Year in the Bonniers Bokklubb annual competition. The rights to the book have been sold to over 30 countries.

In April 2019 the audiobook version read by Martin Wallström was awarded the Stora Ljudbokspriset Best Novel prize at Storytel Awards. In May 2020 Natt och Dag was awarded the Stockholm City Honorary Award for literature.

In May 2023, the Japanese translations by Miho Hellén-Halme of 1794 and 1795 were awarded the Mystery Writers of Japan Award for Mystery Fiction in Translation.

== Bibliography ==
- Bellman noir
  - 2017 – The Wolf and the Watchman (original title: 1793)
  - 2019 – The City Between the Bridges (original title: 1794)
  - 2021 – The Order of the Furies (original title: 1795)
  - 2022 - 1793 graphic novel
- Natt och Dag Dynasty Series
  - 2023 - Hope and Destiny (original title: Ödet och hoppet)
  - 2025 - Wolves at Play (original title: Vargars lek)
