= Virserum =

- Location within Kalmar Location within Sweden
- Coordinates: 57°19′N 15°35′E
- Country: Sweden
- Province: Småland
- County: Kalmar County
- Municipality: Hultsfred Municipality

Area
  - Total: 2.62 km^{2} (1.01 sq mi)

Population (31 December 2010)
  - Total: 1,742
  - Density: 665/km^{2} (1,720/sq mi)
- Time zone: UTC+1 (CET)
  - Summer (DST): UTC+2 (CEST)

Virserum (Swedish pronunciation: [ˈvɪ̂ʂːɛˌrɵm]) is a locality situated in Hultsfred Municipality, Kalmar County, Sweden with 1,742 inhabitants in 2010. Prior to 1971, it was a köping. The history of Virserum goes back to the Middle Ages, and in the 1950s, the town was a centre for the furniture industry. In the village of Bösebo, 10km east of Virserum you can find evidence of settlement from 2500 B.C.

== Gallery ==
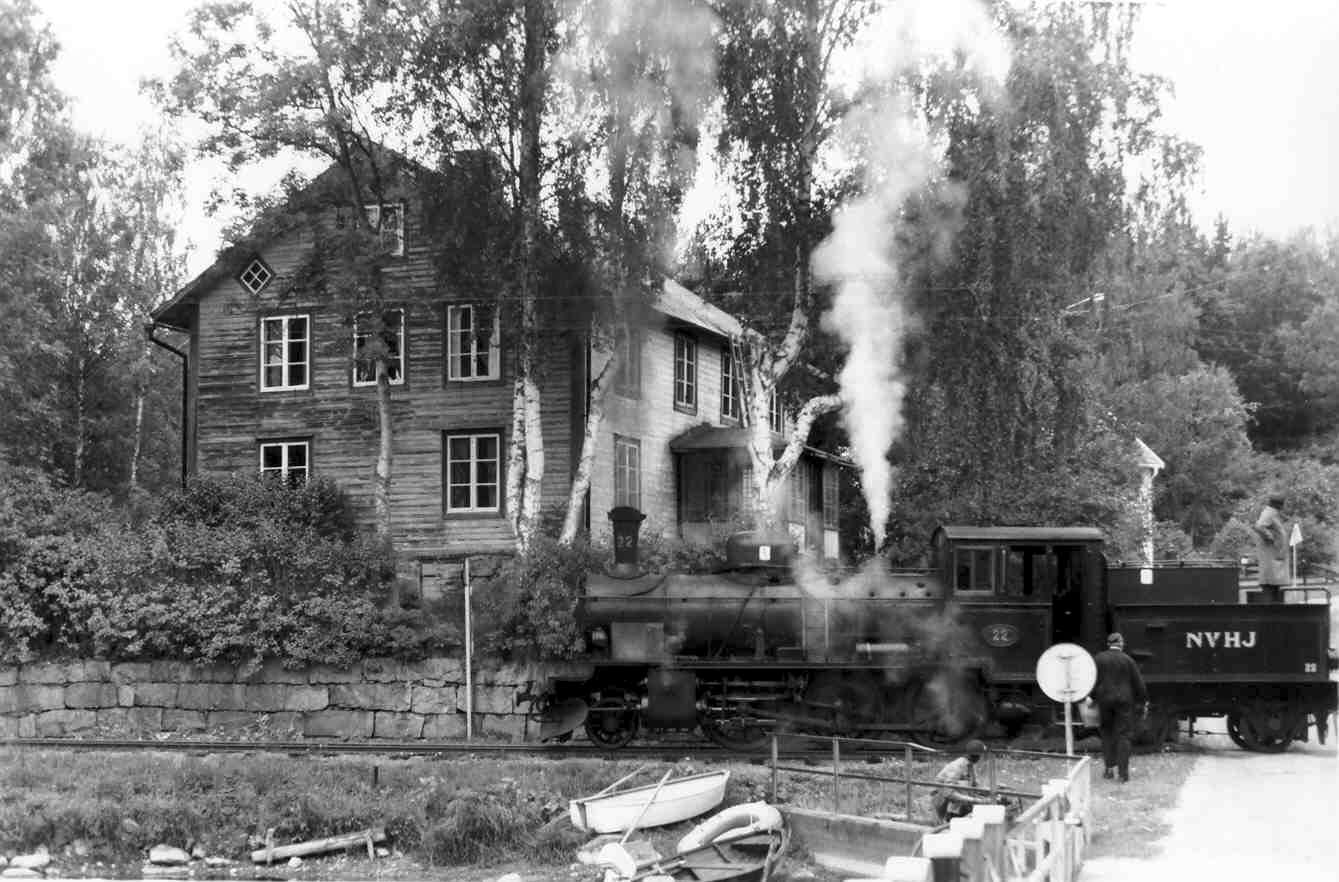
Labourer's home at Hjortöström's wheel factory in Virserum.

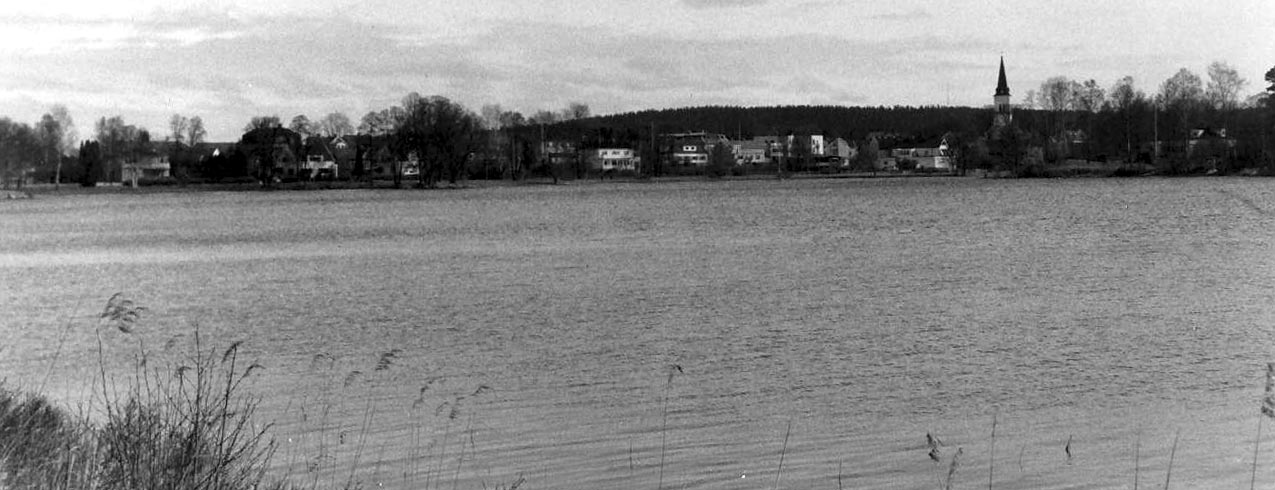
The community of Virserum seen from Virserum Lake, spring 1991.

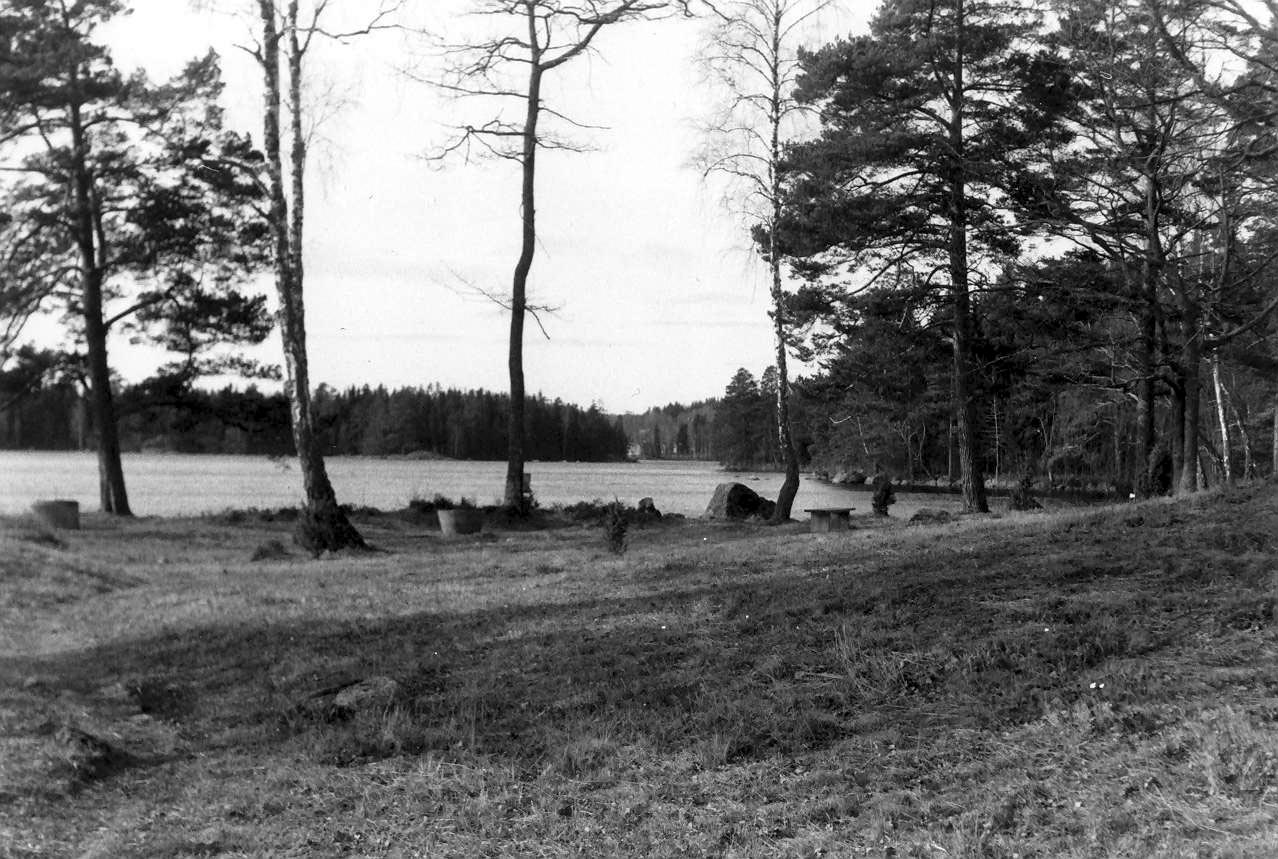
Virserum Lake, spring 1991.

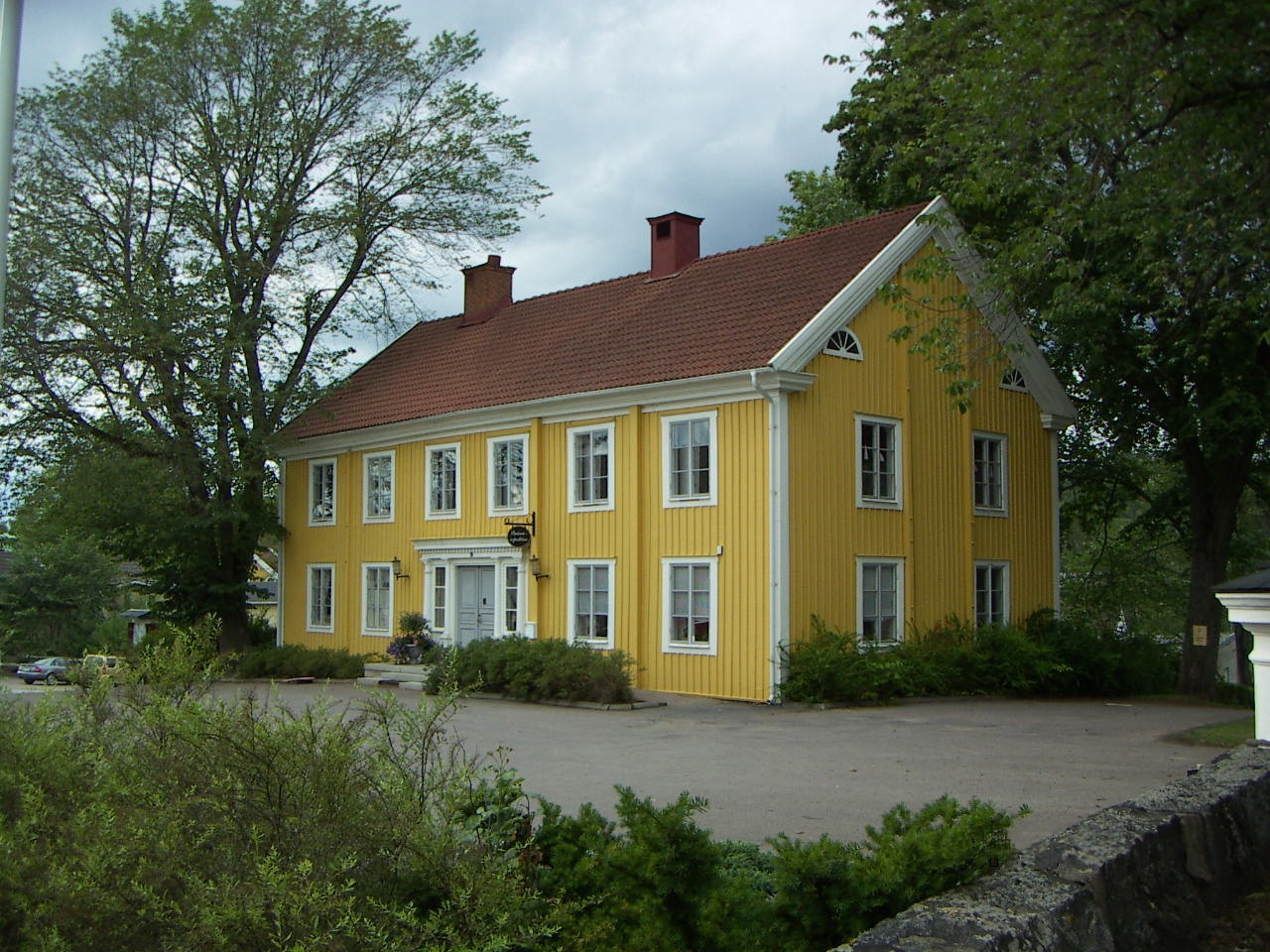
Virserums Parish Home. Is located beside the main square in front of the church.

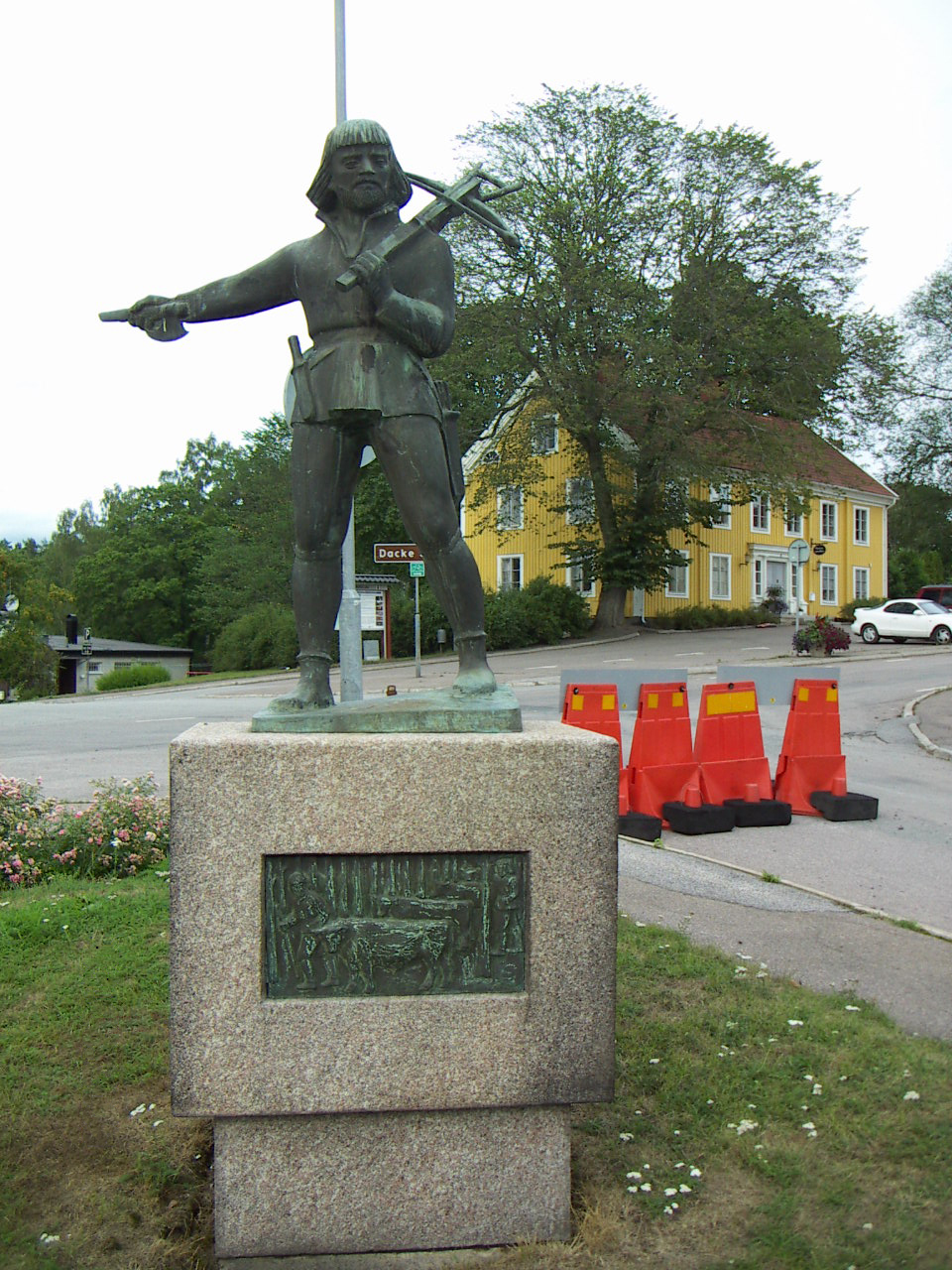
Statue of Nils Dacke in Virserum.

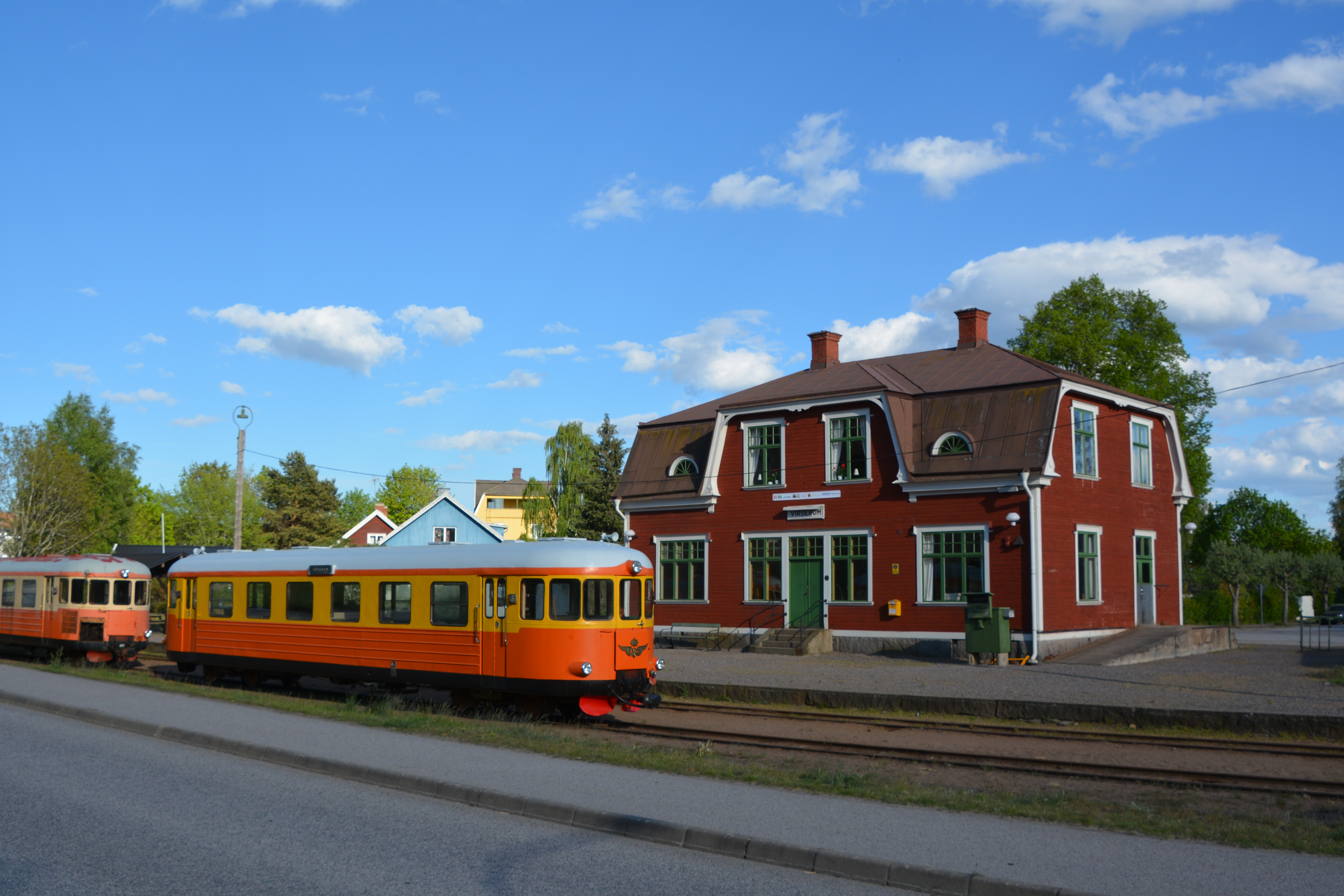
Closed railway station in Virserum.
