= Svante Stensson Sture =

Swedish count (1517–1567)

Svante Sture the Younger
- Governor of Estonia
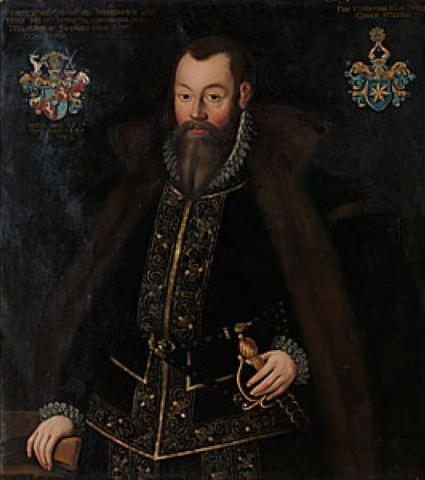
- Svante Stensson Sture by Domenicus Verwilt.
- Born: 1 May 1517; Stockholm
- Died: 24 May 1567; Uppsala Castle
- Wars and battles: Dacke War; Siege of Stegeborg (1543); Livonian War
- Noble family: Sture
- Spouse: Martha Leijonhufvud
- Issue: Sigrid Sture; Magdalena Sture; Anna Sture; Sten Sture; Nils Sture; Sten Sture; Erik Sture; Margareta Sture; Gustaf Sture; Brita Sture; Mauritz Sture; Karl Sture; Iliana Sture; Iliana Sture; Kristina Sture
- Father: Sten Sture the Younger
- Mother: Christina Gyllenstierna

Svante Stensson Sture or Svante Sture the Younger (1 May 1517 – 24 May 1567) was a Swedish count, riksmarsk and statesman. In 1543, he commanded Stegeborg when it was besieged by revolting peasants during the Dacke War. From 1562 to 1564, during the Livonian War, he was governor of Estonia.

Svante was killed alongside five others, including his sons Nils and Erik, in the Sture murders by King Erik XIV.

== Family ==
Svante Sture was the only surviving son of Sten Svantesson Sture (d. y.) and Kristina (Christina) Nilsdotter Gyllenstierna. He was married to Märta ("King Martha") Erikdotter Leijonhufvud on 3 March 1538 at Nyköping Castle, with whom he had the following children:

- Sigrid Svantesdotter Sture (13 December 1538 – 16 March 1613)
- Magdalena (Malin) Svantesdotter Sture (9 November 1539 – 1610)
- Anna Svantesdotter Sture (29 January 1541 – 21 June 1595)
- Sten Svantesson Sture (25 February 1542 – 1542), died in infancy
- Nils Svantesson Sture (20 June 1543 – 24 May 1567)
- Sten Svantesson Sture (4 November 1544 – 7 July 1565)
- Erik Svantesson Sture (18 May 1546 – 24 May 1567)
- Margareta Svantesdotter Sture (16 November 1547 – 8 December 1617)
- Gustaf Svantesson Sture (20 December 1548 – 23 February 1556), died in childhood
- Iliana Svantesdotter Sture (1550 – 24 February 1556), died in childhood
- Mauritz Svantesson Sture (24 November 1552 – 14 March 1592)
- Karl Svantesson Sture (13 December 1555 – 24 January 1598)
- Brita Svantesdotter Sture (11 April 1557 – 23 February 1567), died in childhood
- Iliana Svantesdotter Sture (24 December 1558 – 24 February 1567), died in childhood
- Kristina Svantesdotter Sture (22 December 1559 – 4 January 1619)

== Works cited ==
- Alvemo, Bo [in Swedish] (2006). Dackefejden: det stora upproret 1542-1543 [Dacke Feud: the great uprising of 1542-1543] (in Swedish). Hallstavik: Svenskt Militärhistoriskt bibliotek. ISBN 9789197531597.
