= Tjust =

Coordinates: 57°53′N 16°23′E

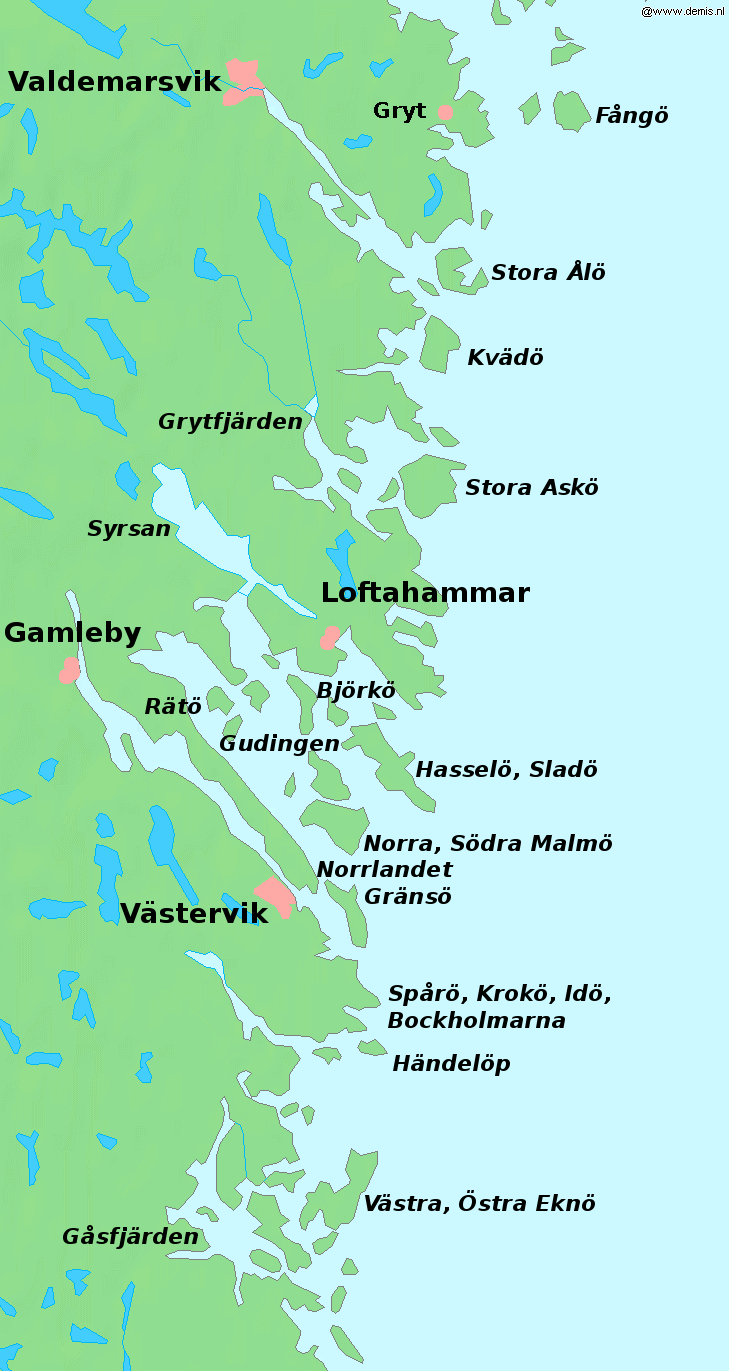
Tjust has an extensive coastal archipelago on the Baltic Sea.

Tjust (Swedish pronunciation: [ˈɕʉːst]) was one of the small lands of Småland, Sweden. It was divided into the hundreds of Tjust Northern Hundred and Tjust Southern Hundred. It corresponds to Västervik Municipality and the southern part of Valdemarsvik Municipality.

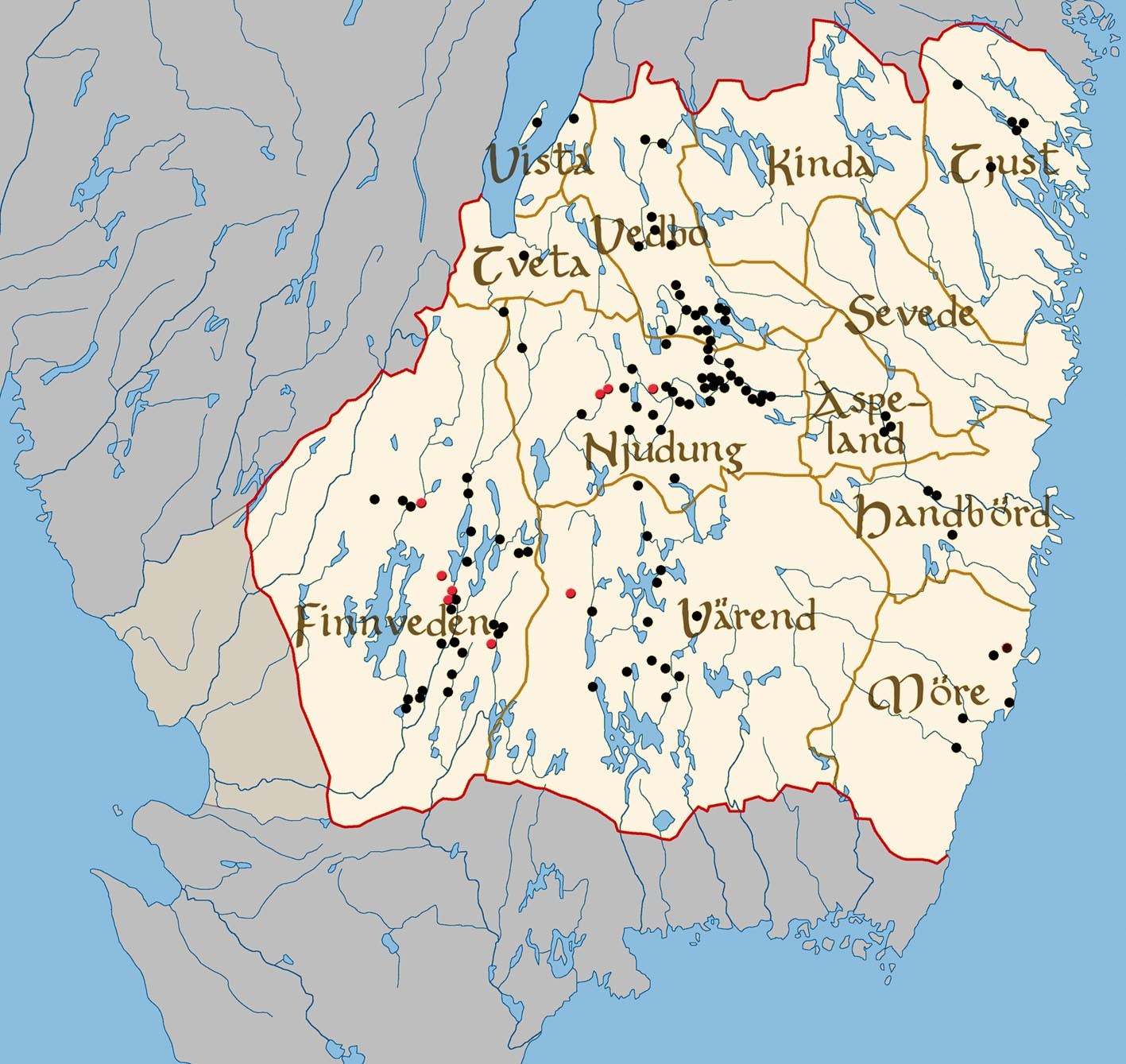
The small lands of Småland. The black and red spots indicate runestones. The red spots indicate runestones telling of long voyages.

== Early attestations ==
In his 500s Getica, Jordanes mentions a Scandinavian tribe theustes, possibly the inhabitants of Tjust. Tjust is also mentioned in the dative singular þiusti on the Södermanland runic inscription 40 from the 1000s. In the 1103 Florens list, it is also found in the Latin form Teuste.
