= Nils Dacke =

Swedish rebel and outlaw (d. 1543)

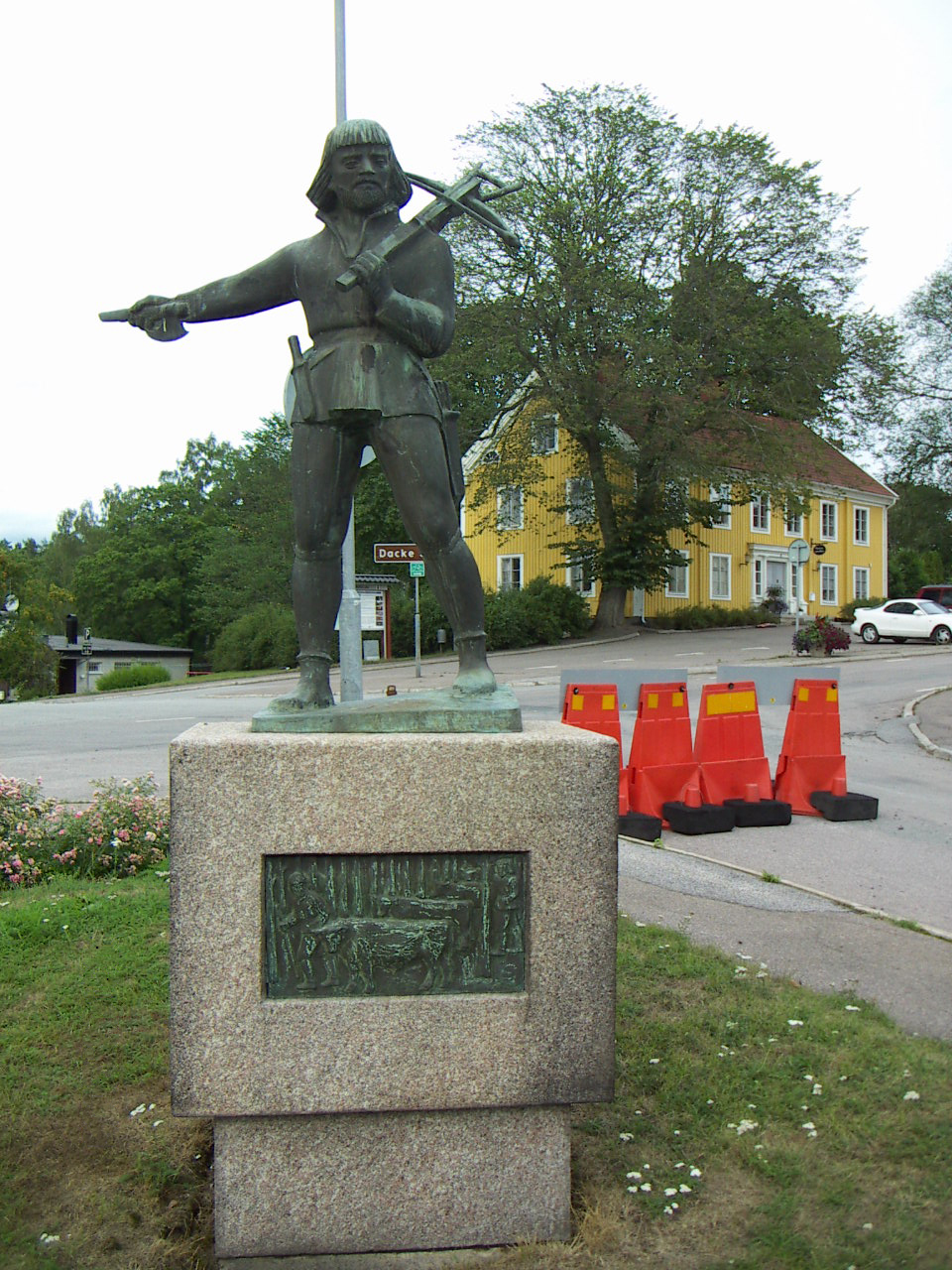
Statue of Nils Dacke in Virserum

Nils Dacke (died 1543) was a Swedish yeoman who was the leader of a mid-16th century peasant revolt in the historic province of Småland in southern Sweden. The resulting Dacke War (Swedish: Dackefejden) was fought against King Gustav I of Sweden of the Vasa family. It was the most widespread and serious civil war in Swedish history and almost toppled the king.

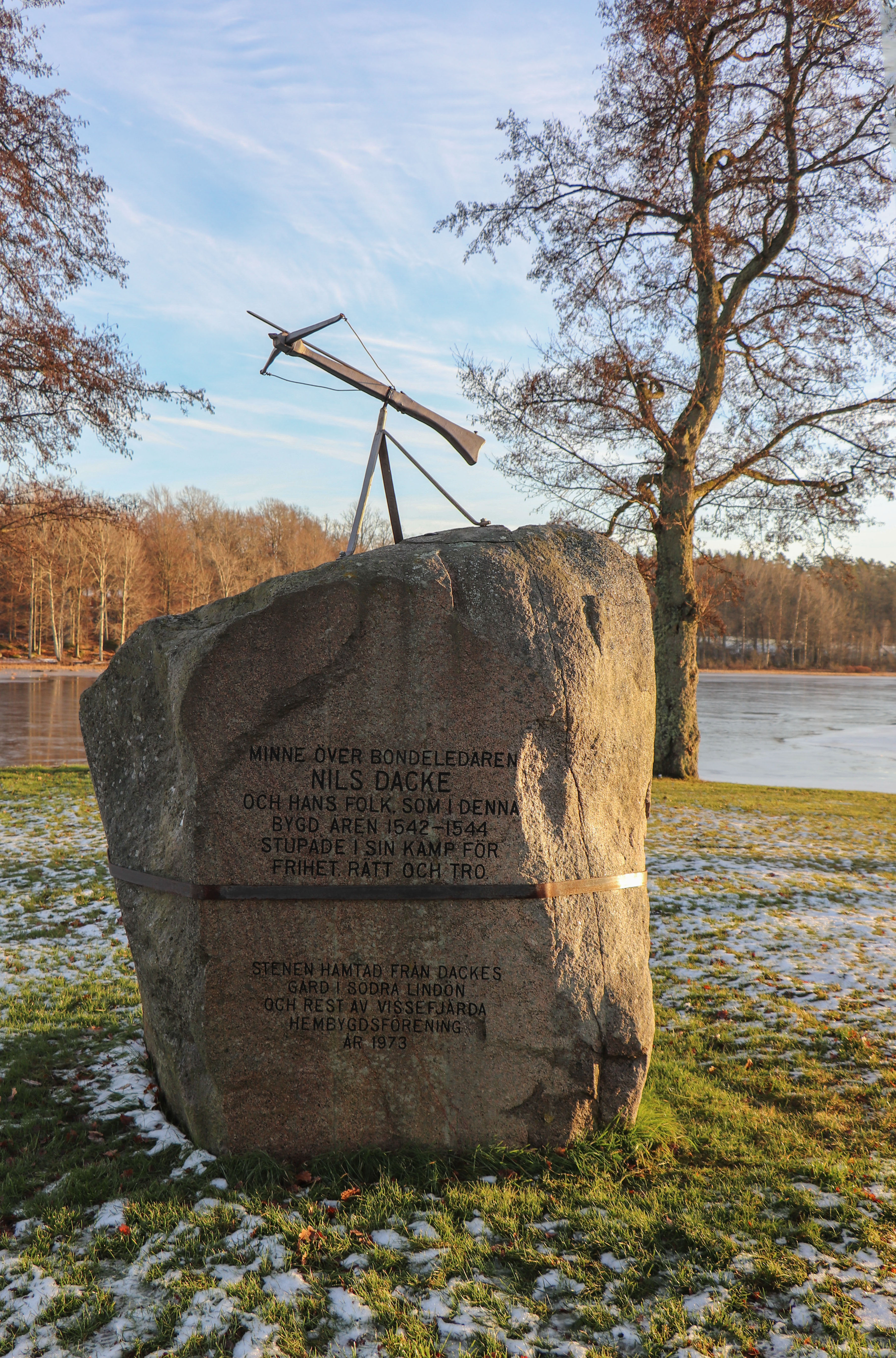
Nils Dacke memorial at Vissefjärda (The text reads: Memorial for the farmerleader Nils Dacke and his people that in this place the years 1542–1544 died in their fight for freedom, law and faith. The stone is gathered from Dackes farm in South Lindön and raised by Vissefjärda local community association in the year 1973)

== Background ==
King Gustav Vasa had come to power at the head of a peasant army in 1523. He had led Sweden out of the Nordic Kalmar Union and made Protestantism the national religion. Småland found itself on the border between Sweden and Denmark and was hit hard by Vasa's ban on cross-border trade. In addition, the heavy handed way in which the church was reformed and the increasing tax burden led to much dissatisfaction among the poor peasants.

== The Dacke War ==
Already in 1536, Nils Dacke was tried at a local court for killing a sheriff; according to court records he was fined 10 oxen. The uprising started in Södra Möre during June 1542 with the assassination of more sheriffs and tax collectors. Gustav Vasa underestimated the military prowess of the peasants and sent his German mercenaries (Landsknecht) to quell the revolt. The landsknechts were, however, unsuited for battle in the rugged forests and suffered heavy losses. Dacke had devised defensive tactics that allowed the peasants to use their steel crossbows with devastating effect. Dacke's successes helped spread the revolt over all the southern provinces of Sweden. The situation was so serious that the king was forced to sue for peace, and a one-year ceasefire was signed on 8 November. During the ceasefire, Dacke was the de facto ruler of most of southern Sweden and received offers of foreign support from the Elector Palatine Frederick II (1482–1556), who was the son-in-law of King Christian II of Denmark, and Albrecht VII, Duke of Mecklenburg (1486–1547). He reinstated the ceremonies of the Roman Catholic Church and reopened the cross-border trade in the areas under his control. With Danish support, Gustav Vasa mounted an invasion of Mecklenburg which neutralised the German threat.

In the autumn of 1542, the king had to agree to a truce with Dacke. The king broke the ceasefire in January 1543 and sent a new and larger army into the rebellious area. His forces moved in from Östergötland and Västergötland. Royal propaganda had been spread to win over the population and turn them against Dacke. Dacke himself had become overconfident after earlier successes and met the Swedish Royal Army in a pitched battle in March. The trained soldiers fighting on their own terms shattered the peasant army, and Dacke was severely injured. After this defeat, the rebellion was effectively over and Dacke became an outlaw.

== Death ==
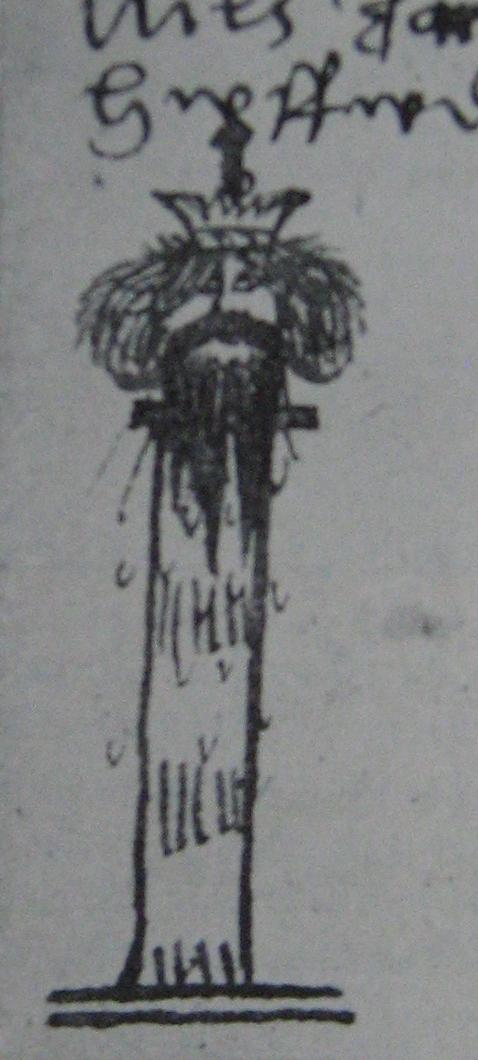
Nils Dacke's severed head. Drawing by the 16th-century chronicler Joen Petri Klint.

Dacke was shot during the summer of 1543 in the forests of the parish of Virserum. According to contemporary sources, he had been injured in both legs by hits from the king's crossbows during the decisive battle a few months earlier, his forces had been routed, and he was likely trying to escape from the king's mercenaries. Dacke eventually fell in August 1543 at a farm in the parish of Gullabo in Södra Möre.

Dacke was executed posthumously, quartered, and his limbs were sent for public display in larger communities that had supported him during the rebellion. Gustav Vasa ordered the annihilation of Dacke's entire family, but showed some leniency against those who had given themselves up. Dacke's wife, brother-in-law and other relatives were executed. His son was taken to prison in Stockholm where he either starved to death or died from the plague. Thus, the unity of the realm was restored.

As a result of the war, the king was henceforth more careful when dealing with his subjects. The reliance on foreign mercenaries in the army was reduced in favour of soldiers of Swedish extraction (many of which were recruited in Småland), and this laid the foundation for Sweden's military successes in later wars.

== Legacy ==
Nils Dacke is commonly perceived as a Småland freedom hero. His name is often linked to an independent streak in Småland. Statues in memory of him have been erected, including one in Virserum, where the final battle allegedly took place during 1543. The Nils Dacke party (Swedish: Nils Dacke-partiet) is a local political party in the township of Gnosjö.

M/S Nils Dacke is a vessel, owned by TT-Line serving the Trelleborg-Świnoujście route.

Dacke, a made-for-television film, was released in 1961 by Swedish director and screenwriter Bengt Lagerkvist.

The asteroid 7217 Dacke is named after him.

== Other sources ==
- Månsson, Fabian (1938) Gustaf Vasa och Nils Dacke: historisk skildring om bondeklassens undergång och herregårdens födelse (Stockholm: Tiden)

== Related reading ==
- Moberg, Vilhelm (2005) A History of the Swedish People: Volume 1: From Prehistory to the Renaissance (University of Minnesota) ISBN 978-0-816-64656-2
- Larsson, Lars-Olof (1979) Dackeland (Stockholm: Norstedts förlag) ISBN 978-91-1-793312-8
