= Linköping Science Park =

City district in Östergötland, Linköping, Sweden

Coordinates: 58°23′39″N 15°33′37″E

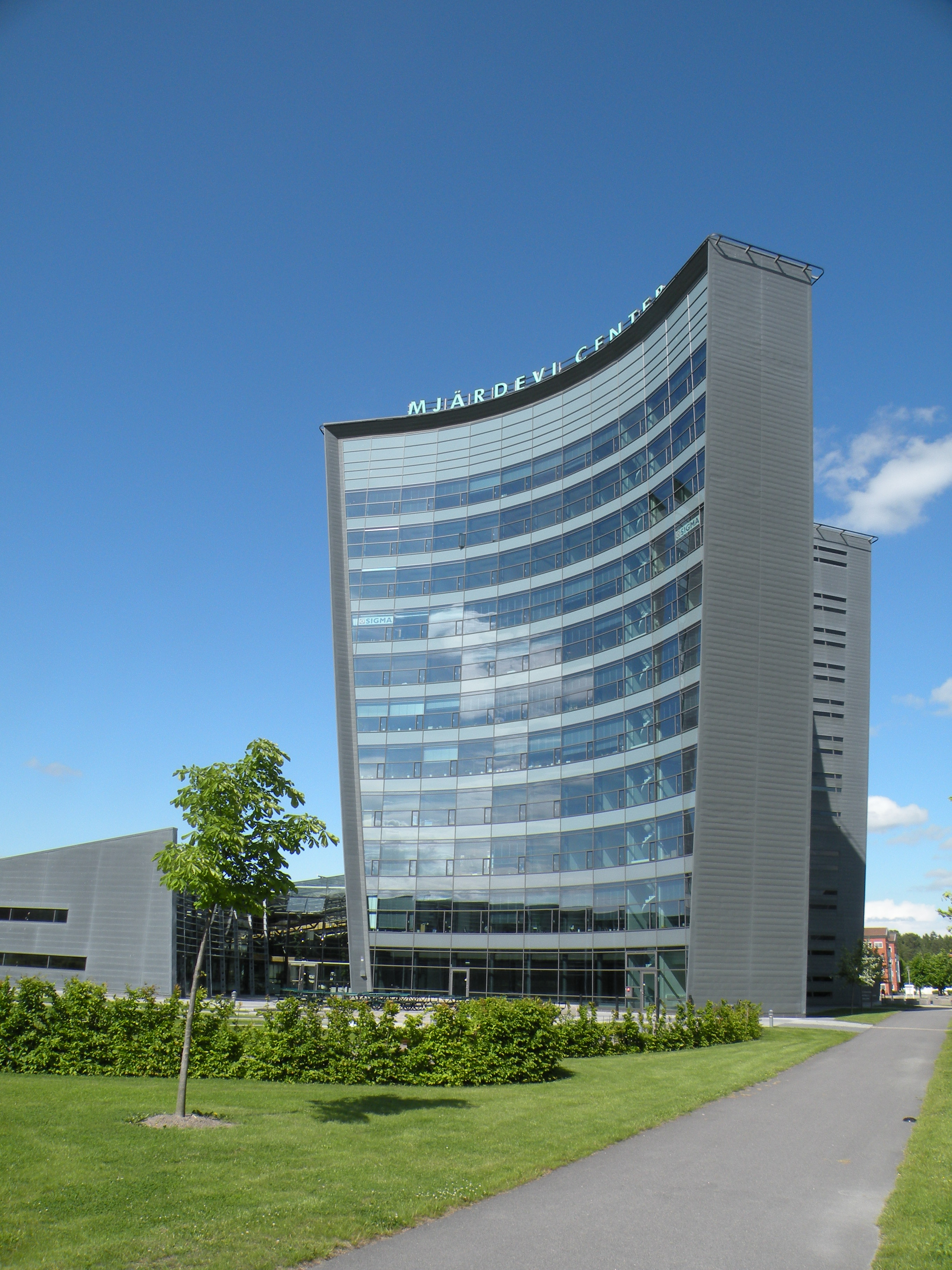
Mjärdevi center in 2010

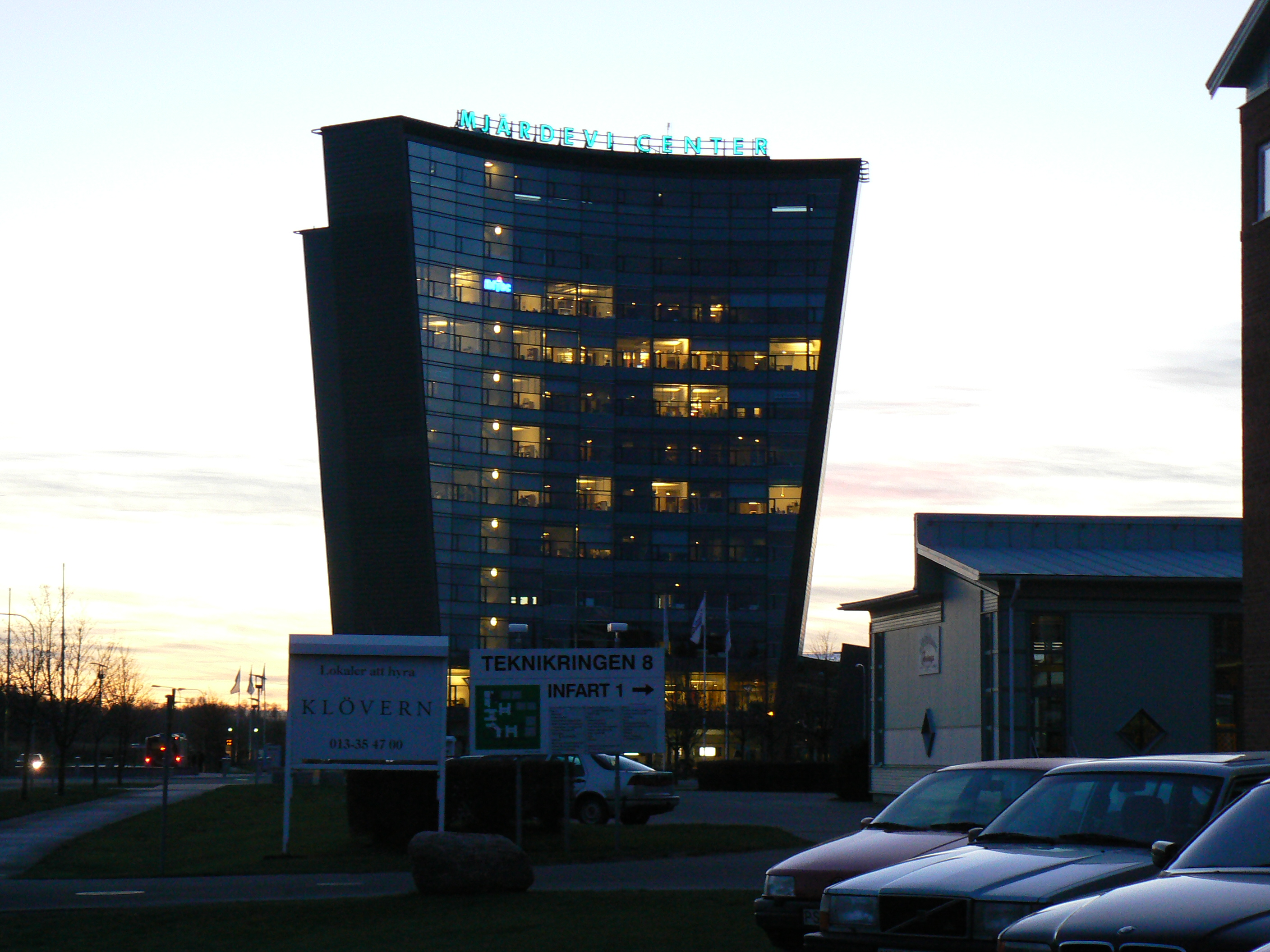
Mjärdevi Center

Linköping Science Park (formerly Mjärdevi Science Park & Science Park Mjärdevi) is a city district and technology area in Östergötland in the city of Linköping.

The area Mjärdevi is located just outside Linköping University Campus Valla and is the core area for Linköping Science park, although the science park operates throughout Linköping and the surrounding region. Linköping Science park includes about 600 companies with a total of 14 000 employees (2023). Many of these companies have been started because of the innovations at Linköping University. The companies operate primarily in technology sectors such as telecommunications, business systems, software and systems engineering, electronics, home communications and vehicle safety. The largest residents of Mjärdevi are Ericsson, Releasy, IFS, Sectra, Infor, Combitech and CGI Group.

A computer history museum, IT-ceum, was built up in Mjärdevi in 2005. In 2009, it was relocated to the county museum, Östergötlands Museum.
