= Djurgården, Linköping =

Swedish city district

Coordinates: 58°23.505′N 15°36.236′E

Djurgården is a city district between Garnisonen and Lambohov in Linköping, which is the process of being developed. It is meant to contain 3 000-5 000 housing units, 200,000 to 300,000 square metres of office space and 30,000 square metres of commerce. Construction start for Djurgårdens centre, the first area in the district, is estimated to be in 2011.

The name Djurgården originates from 1606 when it was a royal hunting park with deer and fallow deer. It was John III's and Gunilla Bielke's son Duke John of Östergötland who had it built. Djurgården was expanded in 1616 and was in operation until the early 1700s, when the live deer were transported by sled to the then new Djurgården in Stockholm, that Charles XI had built. During the 1700s and 1800s, the area was put to the disposal to the county governors as part of their compensation. The area was at that time a popular destination for residents of Linköping. Since then Djurgården has been used as a military training area until the Linköping regiments closed in 1997.
