= Slaka =

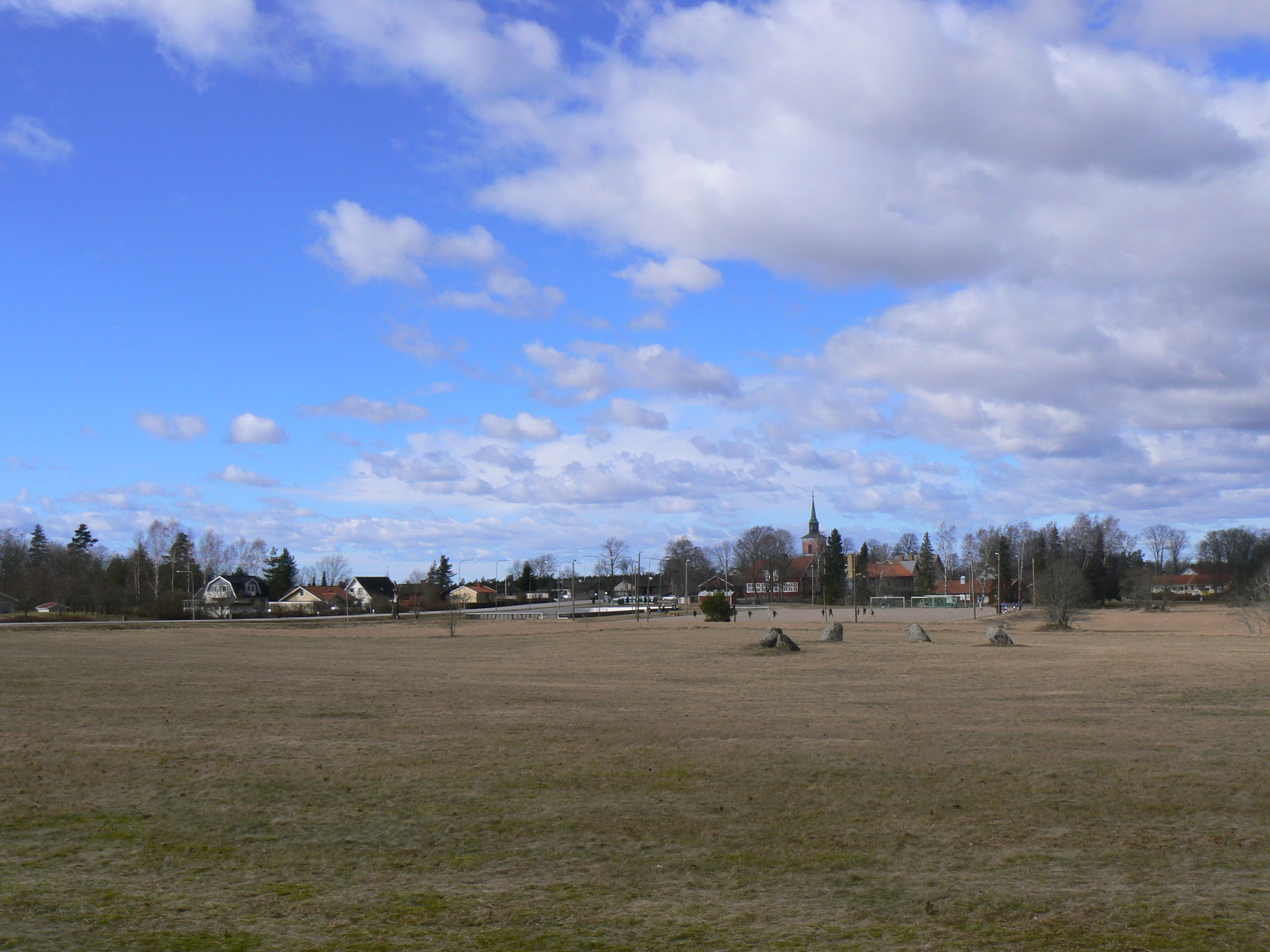

- Location within Östergötland Location within Sweden
- Coordinates: 58°22′N 15°33′E
- Country: Sweden
- Province: Östergötland
- County: Östergötland County
- Municipality: Linköping Municipality

Area
  - Total: 1.12 km^{2} (0.43 sq mi)

Population (31 December 2010)
  - Total: 592
  - Density: 529/km^{2} (1,370/sq mi)
- Time zone: UTC+1 (CET)
  - Summer (DST): UTC+2 (CEST)

Slaka is a locality situated in Linköping Municipality, Östergötland County, Sweden with 592 inhabitants in 2010.
