= Dacke War =

Peasant revolt in Sweden

Date	1542–1543
Location	Småland, Sweden
Result	Uprising defeated

Belligerents
Sweden; Denmark-Norway	Småland peasants Östergötland peasant militia

Commanders and leaders
Gustav Vasa; Måns Johansson; Abraham Eriksson	Nils Dacke (executed)

Strength
Unknown	Unknown

Casualties and losses
Heavy	Unknown

Småland on a map of Sweden.

The Dacke War (Swedish: Dackefejden) was a peasant uprising led by Nils Dacke in Småland, Sweden, in 1542 against the rule of Gustav Vasa. Dacke and his followers were dissatisfied with the heavy tax burden, the introduction of Lutheranism, and the confiscation of Church property (the confiscation and taxes were introduced to pay for the Swedish War of Liberation that had brought Gustav Vasa to power). In 1543 the uprising was defeated, and Nils Dacke was killed.

== Background ==
Nils Dacke and his peasants were dissatisfied with the policies of the Swedish king Gustav Vasa. In his effort to modernize Sweden and gain more power, the king had instituted a more efficient system of tax collection. The heavy tax burden angered many peasants.

Gustav Vasa had also broken relations with Rome and promoted Lutheranism instead of Catholicism; as part of the Swedish Reformation, properties of the church (including land) were appropriated, under the laws of the Reduction of Gustav I of Sweden. In 1541 the king's men had confiscated many of the belongings of the churches in Småland, such as the church silver and even the church bells, to finance the army. Dacke criticized the new church order and promoted the old faith. He was also supported by many local priests.

The rebellion was one of many rebellions during the rule of Gustav Vasa. In contrast with other contemporary rebellions in Sweden, this one was led by peasants, and not supported by the local nobility.

== Uprising ==
The uprising began in summer 1542 when the king's bailiffs were attacked and killed when they came to collect taxes. Gustav Vasa responded by sending a military force led by his own father-in-law Gustav Olofsson Stenbock the Younger. He was defeated by Dacke's constantly growing army of peasants. Other attempts to defeat Dacke militarily also failed. Dacke and his army reached as far north as Mjölby at the fringes of the Östergötland plains and enjoyed widespread support around Sommen and Ydre.

Local aristocrat Måns Johansson (Natt och Dag) sided with the king despite having a troublesome relation to him. He was put in charge of an army to suppress the rebellion.

Next, the Swedish government stopped all supplies of provisions and other necessities to the region. This weakened the rebellion considerably. Defaming propaganda about Dacke was also spread by the government, labeling him a traitor and a heretic.

In March 1543 Gustav Vasa ordered his army of Swedish recruits and German landsknecht mercenaries to attack Småland. This time larger forces were deployed, and Dacke's forces were attacked from two directions – from Östergötland and Västergötland. The uprising was defeated, and Dacke was wounded but managed to flee.

== Aftermath ==
The king's retribution upon the instigators of the rebellion was harsh. The leaders that were caught were executed together with the priests who had supported Dacke. Peasants who had supported the rebellion were deported to Finland, where they had to serve in the army, and the counties where the rebellion had taken place had to pay a large fine to the king.

Dacke himself was caught and killed in August 1543 when trying to escape the country. According to legend, his body was taken to Kalmar, where his head was publicly displayed wearing a crown of copper, as a warning to others.

Unrest in Ydre continued well after the death of Dacke and ended only after Gustav Vasa sent a force of 400 men to pacify the hundred.

The rebellion was the most serious threat to the rule of Gustav Vasa, but after having defeated it he managed to consolidate his power, concentrating more and more power in the hands of the monarch.

== Idiom ==
In the Swedish language, the idiom "not since the Dacke War" is used to mean "not for a long time". This expression is especially common in the southern parts of Sweden but is also used elsewhere.

== See also ==
- Early Vasa era
- History of Sweden
