= 1567 in Sweden =

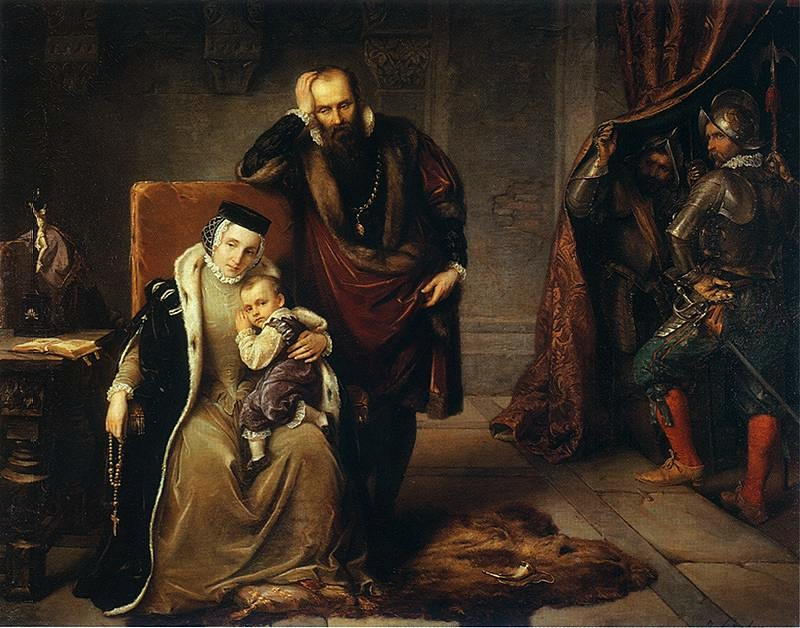
* Description: This is a historical painting showing Catherine Jagiellon, seated and holding a child (probably her son, the future King Sigismund III Vasa), while her husband John, Duke of Finland (later John III of Sweden), stands protectively beside them. The scene is emotionally tense and intimate, possibly set during their imprisonment ordered by Erik XIV in 1563–1567. The background shows guards lurking behind a curtain, emphasizing the feeling of captivity and political tension. Catherine is dressed in noble Renaissance attire, reflecting her royal Polish heritage and high status. The overall tone is somber and dramatic, portraying a moment of both vulnerability and strength during a dark period of Swedish court politics. * (painting by Simmler)

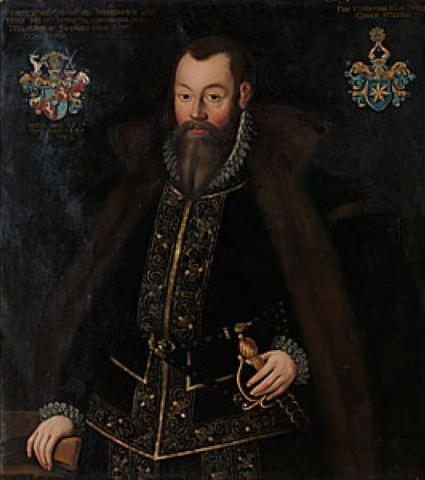
* Description: This formal portrait depicts Svante Stensson Sture, a powerful Swedish nobleman and member of the influential Sture family. He is shown wearing richly decorated black and dark brown Renaissance clothing, with elaborate embroidery and a high fur collar. His pose is dignified and authoritative, with one hand resting on his sword—a symbol of his status and military role. The two family coats of arms are displayed in the top corners of the painting, emphasizing his noble lineage. Svante was tragically one of the noble victims murdered during the Sture Murders of 1567, ordered by the mentally unstable King Erik XIV. * (painting by Domenicus Verwilt)

Events from the year 1567 in Sweden

The year 1567 was a significant and turbulent time in Swedish history, marked by internal strife, royal instability, and major political events during the reign of King Erik XIV.

Key Events

- Sture Murders (May 24–26, 1567) King Erik XIV, suffering from increasing mental instability, ordered the arrest of several prominent members of the Sture family, including Svante Stensson Sture, a leading nobleman. While imprisoned at Uppsala Castle, multiple nobles—including Svante—were murdered either by the king himself or on his orders. The incident, known as the Sturemorden (Sture Murders), became one of the most infamous episodes in Swedish noble history. It resulted in a significant loss of support for Erik among the aristocracy.
- Imprisonment of Catherine Jagiellon Catherine Jagiellon, a Polish princess and wife of John, Duke of Finland (later King John III), was imprisoned alongside her husband due to Erik XIV's growing political paranoia. Their eventual release in 1568 played a pivotal role in John's successful rebellion against his brother.
- Mental Decline of King Erik XIV The king's mental health visibly deteriorated throughout 1567, manifesting in erratic decisions and courtly unrest. He was briefly removed from power that same year. His official deposition followed in 1568, when his brother John seized the throne.
- War with Denmark–Norway (Northern Seven Years' War) Sweden remained deeply involved in the Northern Seven Years' War (1563–1570), a prolonged conflict with Denmark–Norway, Lübeck, and Poland. Ongoing military operations and border raids during 1567 further strained the kingdom's political and economic stability.

Notable Births

- (No documented notable births in Sweden in 1567.)

Notable Deaths

- Svante Stensson Sture (d. May 24, 1567) – Influential nobleman, killed during the Sture Murders.
- Nils Svantesson Sture – Son of Svante, also executed during the same event.
- Erik Sture, Abraham Stenbock, and other high-ranking nobles – Victims of the same purge carried out by or under orders from Erik XIV.

Cultural Notes

- Art and Portraiture Portraits from this period, including works by Domenicus Verwilt, offer visual documentation of many central figures in 1567's political turmoil. These works provide a window into the clothing, demeanor, and symbolic authority of the Swedish nobility during a time of intense upheaval.

== Incumbents ==
- Monarch – Eric XIV

== Events ==
- 3 February - Polish victory at the Battle of Runafer in Estonia.
- 24 May - Erik XIV endures a fit of insanity during which he commits the Sture Murders.
- May - Swedish invasion of Norway.
- 13 July - The King unofficially marries Karin Månsdotter.
- October - The regency council, which rules during the illness of the King, releases Prince John.
- October - The Danish army under Daniel Rantzau invades Sweden through Halland, Västergötland and Östergötland, during which he pillages Jönköping, Vadstena and Alvastra and settles in Skänninge.
- 20 November - Linköping is burnt when the Swedish army pursues the Danes out of Sweden.
- December - Söderköping is burnt.
- 3 December - Norrköping is burnt.
- 28 December - The King's secret marriage to Karin Månsdotter is revealed.

== Births ==
- 24 February – Jindřich Matyáš Thurn, Swedish general (d. 1640)

== Deaths ==
- 24 May - Svante Stensson Sture, statesman (born 1517)
- 24 May - Nils Svantesson Sture, statesman (born 1543)
