= Catherine Stenbock =

Queen of Sweden from 1552 to 1560

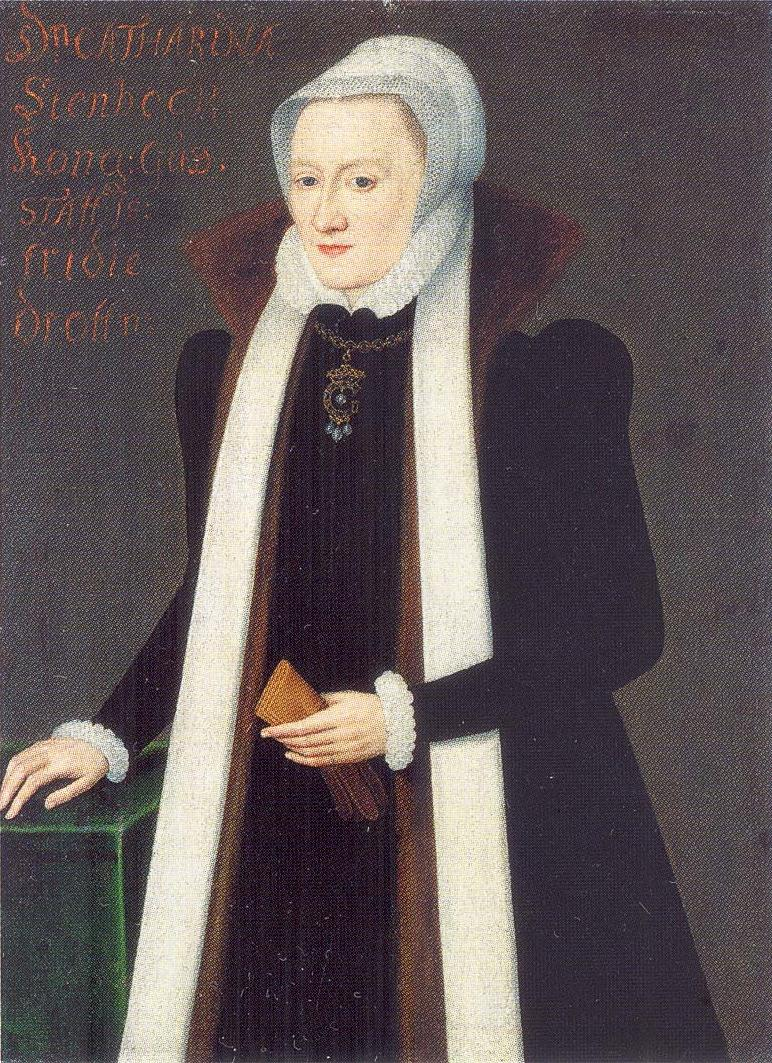
- Catherine as queen dowager. Portrait possibly by Johan Baptista van Uther (c. 1565).

Queen consort of Sweden
- Tenure: 22 August 1552 – 29 September 1560
- Coronation: 23 August 1552
- Born: 22 July 1535; Torpa Castle, Västergötland
- Died: 13 December 1621 (aged 86); Strömsholm, Västmanland
- Burial: Uppsala Cathedral
- Spouse: Gustav I of Sweden
- House: Stenbock
- Father: Gustaf Olofsson Stenbock
- Mother: Brita Eriksdotter Leijonhufvud

Catherine Stenbock (Swedish: Katarina Gustavsdotter Stenbock; 22 July 1535 – 13 December 1621) was Queen of Sweden from 1552 to 1560 as the third and last wife of King Gustav I.

== Early life ==
Catherine Stenbock was born on 22 July 1535 in Torpa Castle, Sweden. She was the daughter of Riksråd Gustaf Olofsson Stenbock and Brita Eriksdotter Leijonhufvud, who was the sister of King Gustav's previous consort Margaret Leijonhufvud. She was thus the maternal niece of Queen Margaret and first cousin of the royal children of that marriage, including future kings John III of Sweden and Charles IX of Sweden. Her siblings included Ebba Stenbock.

There is little information about her prior to her marriage. It is possible that she served as maid of honor to her aunt, the Queen, but either way, she was most certainly known to the King personally: due to the marriage of her aunt, her family belonged to the relations to the King named as Kungafränderna (`The King's Relations´), who played an important role at court, and participated in the family events of the monarch, as well as he was present at the weddings and other events of her family. Her parents were both favored by the monarch. Their marriage was hosted by the King in parallel to his own first marriage in 1531, her father founded his career as a riksråd upon his loyalty to the King, and her mother was in the King's confidence: it was said that "In her [Queen Margaret's] sister Bridget... he always had much trust". Upon the death of her aunt Queen Margaret in 1551, Catherine's mother Brita and aunt Martha Leijonhufvud, in succession to Christina Gyllenstierna, were entrusted the care of the royal children until the King married again, which he was expected to do.

The King declared that a new marriage was necessary foremost because he needed a Queen for his court and a mother for his young children. In March 1552, he called her mother, her aunt Martha and her spouse, and the King's nephew Per Brahe the Elder who was married to Catherine's sister Beata, and it thought that her proposed the marriage to her family at this meeting. Her family was favorable to the match, as this would preserve the family connection they had made with the King through his previous marriage with Queen Margaret, an influence they would keep through Catherine. The reason the King stated to marry Catherine was the great costs and the time-consuming negotiations necessary secure a marriage with a foreign princess in the complicated political climate in Europe during the ongoing religious conflicts. The marriage to Queen Margaret had secured the King a loyal support with the Swedish nobility for his rule, a useful alliance with he confirmed by marrying again in to the same family by marrying the niece of his late spouse. Catherine herself is described as a 155 cm tall, dark blonde beauty with blue eyes.

According to tradition, like her aunt and predecessor Catherine was engaged when the King decided to marry her, to the noble Gustav Johansson Tre Rosor (His last name meaning Three Roses), and after the marriage to the King, he once heard her say in her sleep: "King Gustav is very dear to me, but I shall never forget The Rose". When the King came to her parents manor Torpa to propose to her personally, as the law demanded that she give her personal consent, it is said that she ran away and hid behind a bush in the garden. Whether truthful or not, the King had his way.

There was, however, opposition among the church against a marriage between the King and the niece of his former spouse, and the arch bishop protested quoting the Books of Moses prohibiting the marriage between a man and the widow of his uncle, which was interpreted as the ban against marriage to the relations of a dead spouse. The King had a commission headed by Georg Norman prove that the Old Testament applied only to Jews and that, in any case, it allowed for a man to marry the sister of his dead wife and thereby a marriage to the niece of his wife must be permitted. The King also had his royal council confirm to the church that the King married upon their request out of the need for a Queen rather than for an infatuation and that he had the right to marry whom he choose, after which the church agreed to the marriage.

== Queen ==
The marriage was conducted in the chapel of the Vadstena Abbey 22 August 1552, followed by the coronation of Catherine as Queen the following day. She was dressed in a golden dress during the wedding, and a silver one during her coronation, escorted, as was Queen Margaret during official ceremonies, by her male relatives. The wedding was surrounded what was seen as bad omens: the plague swept through parts of the nation, the city of Turku burned down, and people claimed to see bad omens and evil signs in the sky. The celebrations lasted for three days. When the court departed, the city of Vadstena burned down in a great fire, which was seen as another bad omen.

There is little information of Catherine Stenbock as Queen. As such, she was, with the assistance of her head lady-in-waiting Anna Hogenskild, made responsible to supervise the female courtiers and her cousins, the royal children; in the case of the princesses, until they married, and in the case of the princes, until they were no longer children. It seems as if her relationship to her royal stepchildren was a good one, with the exception of Duke Charles. Her private relationship to the King is not much mentioned, and it has been said that she: "Accepted her part as Queen of Sweden with silent dignity" and without attracting too much personal attention. It is said, however, that the King did find their age difference too great and contemplated writing a law which would prevent any future marriage between: "Two people, of which one was young and one was old". As Queen, she was expected by her family to replace her aunt Queen Margaret in the role of acting as a loyal as a channel between her family and the King, preserving the influence of her family, a task she obediently fulfilled: in 1556, for example, she was asked by her aunt Martha Leijonhufvud of a document from the King regarding the rights to Läckö fief, a task she performed successfully. There are no information that she ever involved herself in any personal political agenda of any kind. One of the few incidents mentioned of her during her tenure as Queen was during the conflict between the young courtier Hogenskild Bielke and her brothers Erik and Olof, in which Bielke accused Olof and Erik of using their positions as brothers of the Queen to terrorize the other young male courtiers while being protected by Catherine. Her stepson John's lover Karin Hansdotter originally belonged to her court.

In 1554 and in 1556, there were signs that she was pregnant, but no pregnancy was ever officially announced and none was ever confirmed. In 1555, she and the royal children accompanied the King to the province of Finland, where they stayed until 1556. During their stay on Åland, where they spend the winter upon their return after their visit to Finland, Catherine was affected by "Sudden motherly problems", which has been interpreted as a miscarriage, which is the closest information available of a pregnancy of Catherine Stenbock.

In Stockholm on 1 October 1559, she was present at the wedding between her stepdaughter Princess Catherine and Edzard II, Count of East Frisia. On their departure from Sweden, the newly weds was accompanied by the sister of the bride and the brother of the groom, Princess Cecilia of Sweden and Johan II of East Frisia. On their stay in Vadstena, Cecilia and Johan were discovered by Crown Prince Eric to have a sexual affair. The great scandal were to be known as Vadstenabullret (Vadstena Rumble). Catherine and Edzard were placed in house arrest, Johan were imprisoned, while Eric and Cecilia where both called back to Stockholm. The King is said to have cried when he related the story to Queen Catherine. During the whole affair, Catherine Stenbock was on numerous occasions asked to act as mediator between the King and his children. She accompanied Cecilia to her confrontation with her father after her return to the capital, and she acted as channel through the King for Princess Catherine, who tried to negotiate Johan's release and permission for her and her spouse to leave for East Frisia. In May 1560, Prince Eric asked her for a permission from his father to travel to England to propose to Elizabeth I of England.

King Gustav fell sick and died during the scandal. According to the chronicles, Catherine was present by his bedside during his entire sickness until death, had a bed brought in by his side where she slept, and eventually fell sick herself. She continued to act as mediator between the King and his children, and upon his complaints that they were not there, answer that they would have been, and wished to, had they not been so afraid for his anger.

== Reign of Eric XIV ==
King Gustav died on 29 September 1560 and was succeeded by his son in his first marriage, Eric XIV. In his will, Catherine was promised custody of the Princesses, who were to live at the court of Eric or her until they married, an allowance suitable for her position, and that his sons should always see to it that she had her needs taken care of. He did not specify which estates should be given to her in his will, but prior to his death, he had his two eldest sons Eric and John promise to grant her preferred choice, Strömsholm. In March, Catherine had Eric XIV issue a written statement of her right to Strömsholm, which remained her seat for the rest of her life, as well as several other lands and parishes in Södermanland, as well as her own residence in the capital. The mother of the new King's infamous adviser Jöran Persson, Anna, was the house keeper of the Queen Dowager's court at Strömsholm.

Catherine Stenbock remained a widow for 61 years, and despite participating in various kinds of ceremonies, she dressed in mourning for the rest of her life. She was the first Swedish Queen Dowager referred to by the title Riksänkedrottning (Queen Dowager of the Realm). During most of the reign of Eric XIV, the King was unmarried, and Queen Dowager Catherine ceremoniously functioned as the first lady of the royal court. In 1562, for example, she and the King opened a ball given in honor of the Polish embassy sent to negotiate the wedding between the King's brother Prince John and the Polish Princess Catherine Jagellon.

Queen Dowager Catherine seems to have had a good relationship to Eric XIV, who normally treated her with respect, referred to her as "My Dear Stepmother" and trusted her on certain critical occasions. During the conflict between the King and his brother Prince John, when the King had John imprisoned with his spouse, Catherine offered her assistance as mediator, but was refused by Eric who accused her of siding with John and reminded her that King Gustav had asked them all to show loyalty to his successor.

Catherine was given an important role in connection to the infamous Sture Murders. In the spring of 1567, the King had several noblemen imprisoned and taken to Uppsala, accused of treason. Among them were brother of Catherine, Abraham Gustafsson Stenbock; the spouse of her aunt Martha Leijonhufvud, Svante Sture; and her two cousins, Nils Svantesson Sture and Erik Svantesson Sture, and her uncle Sten Eriksson Leijonhufvud. On 24 May, the King had a fit of insanity and killed Nils Svantesson Sture, after which he had her other relatives, with the exception of Sten Eriksson Leijonhufvud, as well as another nobleman, killed. After this, the King left Uppsala. He was found some days later outside the city in a severe state, and taken to the capital, where he was left in the care of Karin Månsdotter. Catherine arrived to Uppsala the day of the murders. She was contacted by a delegation from the King headed by her uncle Sten Leijonhufvud and Hogenskild Bielke, recently also kept prisoners by the King, and asked to act as mediator between the King and the relatives of the murder victims. They escorted her to the capital, where she was given an audience with the King. This was to be the first audience with the King since the murders, and the royal court awaited her arrival, as no one had dared to come in the King's presence since the Sture murders. When she entered the audience room, the King reportedly fell down on his knees before her and asked forgiveness for the murders. He gave her a written document giving her the authority to negotiate the settlement with the relatives of the murder victims, among them her aunt Martha Leijonhufvud. Through Catherine, Martha Leijonhufvud put forward her demands of a letter of protection against further persecution of the King; an official statement of the innocence of the murder victims; economic compensation and the arrest of the people truly responsible for the behavior of the monarch, which was regarded to be his adviser Jöran Persson. The King accepted all terms of the settlement, though he soon reinstated Persson.

During the illness and convalescence of the King, the Kingdom was ruled by a regency council including the uncles of Catherine, Per Brahe the Elder and Sten Leijonhufvud. During this period, Catherine made several visits to the imprisoned brother of the King, Prince John in Uppsala. She was also present when Eric XIV visited his brother in October and in his confusion asked him if he was the King or not. She managed to arrange a form of reconciliation between the brothers, and had Prince John moved to Arboga, where he was guarded less strictly. Catherine is given credit for contributing to the recovery of the King's sanity later in that year.

On 9 June 1568, Catherine was made god mother of the King's son by Karin Månsdotter, and carried him to his baptism. On 4 July 1568, she participated in the double wedding between the King and Karin Månsdotter and the Princess Sophia and Magnus II of Saxe-Lauenburg. In the procession to church, the Queen Dowager escorted the King's bride, while the second bride, the King's sister Princess Sophia, followed secondly with Princess Elizabeth, which was regarded an insult in matter of rank, as the marriage between the King and the commoner was regarded a scandal which was boycotted by the Dukes, the brothers of the King. There were reports, that the King had plans to have his brothers, as well as other enemies invited to the wedding, killed during the celebrations, but that the plans failed because Månsdotter warned the intended victims through Queen Dowager Catherine. According to another version, Catherine did so on her own initiative.

During the rebellion of the Dukes, the King's brothers, which erupted after the controversial marriage of the King and ended in the dethronement of King Eric XIV that same year, Catherine and her stepdaughters, the Princesses Sophia and Elizabeth, were with the King in the capital. According to the official statement given by Prince John after the deposition in 1569, they were placed under guard, prevented from leaving and placed under the threat of being presented to Tsar Ivan the Terrible of Russia as hostages. Eric XIV had made an alliance with Russia against Poland, and the Tsar had presented the demand that he should give him his Polish sister-in-law, the spouse of Prince John, Princess Catherine Jagellon, as hostage to use against Poland, and a Russian embassy was at the time waiting in Stockholm to bring Catherine Jagellon to Russia. Eric XIV felt forced to decline this demand because of international pressure, but had offered to replace his Polish sister-in-law with his stepmother and his two sisters. According to John, the relationship between the King and the Queen Dowager was bad at this point, as he had accused her of having financed the Danes during the ongoing Northern Seven Years' War and threatened not only to give her, his sisters and their ladies-in-waiting over to the Russians but also to burn them alive.

It is unclear how much of this is true and what is propaganda from the later John III to excuse the deposition of his brother, but what ever the case, Queen Dowager Catherine and Princesses Sophia and Elizabeth left the court and escaped to join the rebellious Dukes after having been given a threat of some kind by the King, likely when they were told of their planned Russian captivity. One version said that they were permitted to take a boat trip and continued until the other shore, and another one that they took a walk in the town and continued to the city gate: in any case, when they had left town, they were joined by the spouse of Princess Sophia, Magnus II of Saxe-Lauenburg, who had been sent by the King to pursue his brothers, but who instead took the Queen Dowager and the Princesses to join the rebels. When Eric XIV was forced to extradite his adviser Jöran Persson, it is possible that Catherine had a say in his fate: many decades later, she was threatened by the son of Persson, who blamed her for his father's death. Around this time, the French ambassador Charles de Dancay described the queen dowager Catherine as "a beautiful woman in her mid 30s".

During the following imprisonment of Eric XIV and Karin, their children were placed in the custody of Catherine Stenbock and their French governess Johanna de Herboville from 1568 until 1570. Eric XIV had a good relation to Catherine: even after having been attacked by her brother Olof in prison, he gave her the credit for not having been put to death after his dethronement.

== Reign of John III ==
After the succession of John III to the throne, her lands were questioned by her youngest stepson Duke Charles, as they were situated in his Duchy. All her fiefs in Södermanland were exchanged for Åland, which was a very favorable exchange, as Åland gave a much larger income than her previous lands. She had a good relationship with the King and often lent him money. Her estates made it possible for her to act as one of the foremost financiers of John III, particularly in his war with Russia, loans he was unable to pay her back. Her sole remaining estate in Södermanland were her main residence Strömsholm, which caused a conflict with Duke Charles. The Duke insisted that Strömsholm belonged to him because it was situated in his Duchy. He demanded that she evacuate the fief to him, sent armed troops to the area to prevent her from collecting taxes from the farmers of the area and threatened to attack the estate to remove her physically. The conflict escalated to this point prior to his marriage in 1579, because he wished to present Strömsholm as the residence of his bride. Catherine's rights were protected by John III, who reminded Charles that although the King had not mentioned the estate in his will, he had asked the Princes to ensure the right of his widow to it verbally. The conflict, however, continued until 1582, when John III formally had the royal council declare a verdict in favor of Catherine in the matter and threaten Charles with the loss of his succession rights to the throne unless he respected the decision.

In 1570, Catherine had a wish to marry Duke Francis II of Saxe-Lauenburg, the brother-in-law of her stepdaughter Princess Sophia. These plans was however prevented by the spouse of Sophia, Magnus II of Saxe-Lauenburg. During the time of conflict between her and Duke Charles of the rights to Strömsholm (circa 1580), she received a proposal from a German Count Palatine, but declined the offer.

During the reign of John III, she no longer had such a prominent place at court, as the King was married. Because of her royal rank, she occupied a more and more dominant role in her own birth family, and often hosted family meetings and arranged family occasions such as weddings and funerals, and continued to act as a channel between her relatives and the royal house. In 1574, a scandal took place when her brother Erik Stenbock made his legendary elopement with their cousin, Malin Sture, daughter of her famous aunt Martha Leijonhufvud. The couple were in love, but had been forbidden to marry by Martha because they were cousins. Martha had the King imprison Erik, but Catherine and Duke Charles both acted as mediators, and managed to have Erik released and have their love marriage acknowledged within a year. In 1582, she participated in the meeting between Karin Månsdotter and Queen Catherine Jagellon at Svartsjö Castle.

Queen Catherine Stenbock, as well as Queen Gunilla Bielke, both acted as mediators during the conflict between the King and the Royal Council in 1589–90. During the conflict, John III suspected the Councillors of conspiring to depose him in favor of the son of Eric XIV. Catherine was informed that rumors circulated in which she was to have hosted a meeting for the Councillors at Strömsholm where they conspired to depose the King. She contacted the King and defended her against the accusations, and was never openly accused.

== Reign of Sigismund III Vasa ==
In 1592, John III died and was succeeded by his son Sigismund III Vasa, the elected King of Poland, which was opposed by Duke Charles. Catherine participated in the burial of John III in 1594, and had her fiefs confirmed by Sigismund, with the right to appoint the officials in Åland.

In 1595, civil war erupted between Sigismund and Duke Charles. Her brothers refused to join Duke Charles, who declared them, her brother-in-law Klaus Fleming, Governor of Finland, and her nephew as his enemies. Klaus Fleming had a new official appointed to her fief of Åland and used its supplies for Sigismund against Charles. This was likely done with the approval of Catherine, who had sent warnings about Charles to Fleming, but this could not be proven, even though Charles had one of Fleming's men arrested and interrogated. In November 1597, Catherine's fief Åland was confiscated by Charles on the ground of it having been used against him. The same year, after the warfare of Duke Charles toward the loyalists of Sigismund in Finland, Fleming was killed, and Catherine's sister Ebba Stenbock and her daughters were taken captive by the Duke and imprisoned in Stockholm: the son of Ebba was killed during the Åbo Bloodbath in 1599. Several of the relatives of Queen Dowager Catherine remained loyal to Sigismund and fled to Poland. She visited Queen Christina to plead to the King through her in 1599.

Duke Charles could prove nothing against Catherine herself, and her fief of Åland was eventually replaced by Drottningholm. Her residence of Strömsholm became a refuge for the abandoned wives and daughters of her male relatives, who fled to Sigismund in Poland and had their estates in Sweden confiscated, and she petitioned for the confiscated property to be returned to her female relations, sometimes eventually with success. Her sister Ebba and her daughters lived with her after they were released from prison in 1600. Among the female relations she received as maid of honor were Ebba Brahe in 1614, who was the removed from the employ of the mother of Gustavus Adolphus of Sweden to prevent a love match with the King, and whose wedding she hosted in 1618.

== Later life, death and legacy ==
Queen Dowager Catherine Stenbock spent her last years tending to her estates, engaging in iron works and other enterprises, and spending time with her relatives, especially her sisters. During her last years, she became periodically crippled, and was for this reason not able to attend the wedding of Gustavus Adolphus of Sweden in 1620.

She has been given a charitable reputation because she gave a safe haven to many female relations to the exiled loyalists of Sigismund, and because she often acted as a channel of the local peasantry and the royal house.

She died on 13 December 1621, aged 86, at Strömsholm. Upon her death, it was said that: "The poor have lost a friend, the orphans their mother". She was buried in Uppsala Cathedral, but without a monument of her own.

== Notes ==
Catherine Stenbock Born: 22 July 1535 Died: 13 December 1621
Swedish royalty
Vacant Title last held by Margaret Leijonhufvud	Queen consort of Sweden; 1552–1560	Vacant Title next held by Karin Månsdotter
