= Sture murders =

1567 murders of Swedish nobles by Erik XIV

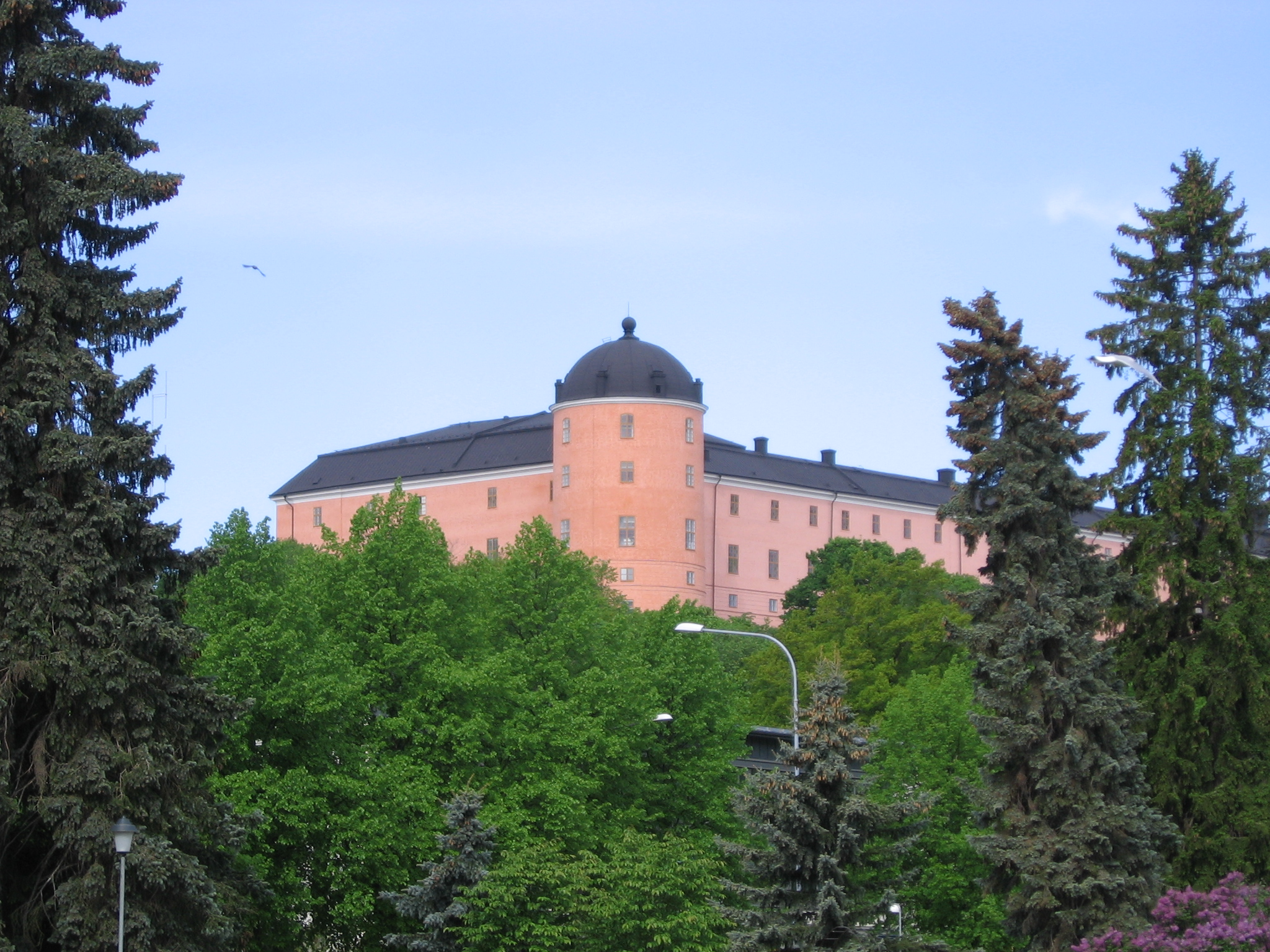
- Uppsala Castle, site of the Sture Murders
- Native name: Sturemorden
- Date: 24 May 1567
- Venue: Uppsala Castle
- Location: Uppsala, Sweden; 59°51′12″N 17°38′07″E
- Type: Murder
- Cause: Mental illness
- Deaths: 6
- Arrests: None
- Accused: Erik XIV of Sweden
- Litigation: Settlement with families of victims

The Sture murders (Swedish: Sturemorden) in Uppsala, Sweden, of 24 May 1567, were the murders of five incarcerated Swedish nobles by Erik XIV of Sweden, who at that time was in a state of serious mental disorder, and his guards.

The nobles, among them three members of the influential Sture family, had been charged with conspiracy against the king and some were previously sentenced to death. Erik's old tutor, who did not belong to this group, was also killed when he tried to calm the king after the initial murders.

== Background ==
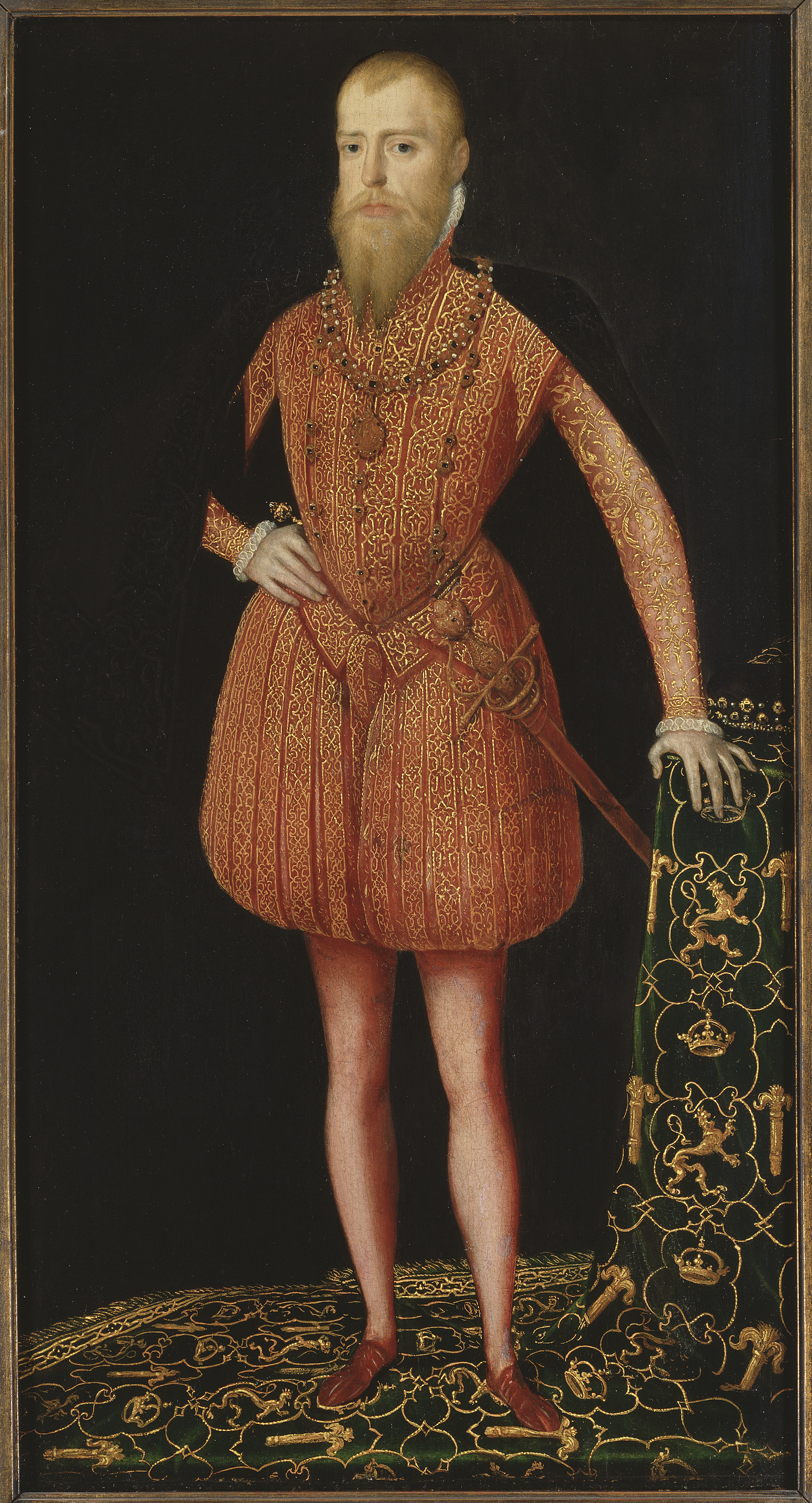
Erik XIV of Sweden

=== Conflict between Erik XIV and the aristocracy ===
In the 1560s, Erik was involved in the Livonian War and the Northern Seven Years' War. Since he led many campaigns in person, his secretary Jöran Persson was left in charge of the administration. The Privy Council of Sweden, the board of nobles responsible for advising the king, was effectively replaced by Persson; also, nobles had been ousted from Erik's high court (Konungens Nämnd) and replaced by loyal commoners, and Persson was made the king's chief prosecutor. The king and his secretary used the high court not only to enforce their financial, war-related demands on the nobles, but also to torture nobles to reveal information about opposition groups. For the use of torture to be legal, the tortured person had to be sentenced to death first – therefore, the high court sentenced more than 300 people to death between 1562 and 1567, yet in most cases reduced the penalty later.

Although Erik distrusted the nobility as a whole, he became particularly suspicious of Nils Svantesson Sture, who was arrested and tried. Despite his many illegitimate children, Erik lacked a legal heir and feared that Sture might claim his throne. The Stures were a very influential family, and Erik projected an astrological reading on Nils Sture saying that he would be succeeded by a "light-haired man". According to Peterson (2007),

the strain of war, paranoia toward just about everybody, especially the aristocracy, personal and national pressures to provide an heir, and his own mercurial personality were steadily crowding Erik to the edge of mental collapse. His frustrations and anxieties gradually began to center on one person.

On the basis of unsubstantiated charges like "neglect of duty," Nils Sture was sentenced to death, but the verdict was commuted to a humiliating drive through the streets of the capital; on 15 June 1566, he had to ride through Stockholm on a wretched hack wearing a crown of straw, with some of his wounds suffered from prior torture still bleeding. Thereafter, Erik sent Nils Sture to Lorraine, where he was to arrange the marriage of Princess Renata (Note: According to Peterson, Nils Sture was sent to Lorraine to arrange the marriage to Renata's mother, Christina; this is however contradicted by other English-language historians such as Bain and Roberts as well as the Swedish historians, who all agree that Erik courted Renata. Yet Christina played a vital role in the negotiations.) to Erik (which would never materialize).

Secretary rule, reduction of the nobility's influence on politics, and the high court's actions were not received well by the Swedish aristocracy. In July 1566, several influential nobles met near Stockholm. According to Geijer, this was a farewell party for Nils Sture, while Peterson refers to the meeting as a "secret gathering" where the magnates' "fear and hatred turned to organized resistance". The meeting was attended by Nils Sture, his father, Svante Stensson Sture, Abraham Gustafsson Stenbock, Ivar Ivarsson Lillieörn, Hogenskild Bielke, Clas Eriksson Fleming, Sten Axelsson Banér, Sten Eriksson Leijonhufvud, Erik's brother Charles of Södermanland and others. Erik feared a conspiracy against him, particularly by the Sture family and their relatives, and already on 22 July increased the number of his spies.

In January 1567, Erik's page, Gustaf Ribbing, who had been sentenced to death for desertion, under torture accused Svante Sture, Per Brahe, Gustaf Olsson Stenbock and Sten Erikson of sabotaging Erik's marriage plans. Svante Sture and Sten Erikson had to sign a document acknowledging that they had plotted against the king's marriage, and that they would not stand in the way of Erik's future marriage plans, even if this meant the king's marriage to his non-noble mistress, Karin Månsdotter. While Persson continued to collect evidence against Erik's perceived and real opponents, Erik summoned a riksdag in Uppsala in May 1567 to settle the quarrels.

=== Svartsjö trials ===
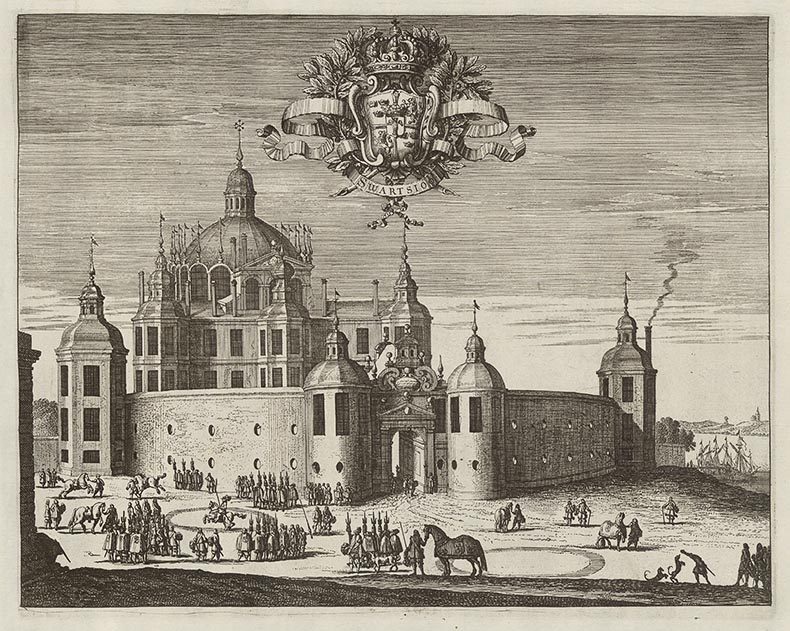
Svartsjö Castle

On their way to the riksdag, several magnates were invited by Erik to Svartsjö Castle, especially those who had met, near Stockholm in July 1566. Erik was also present in Svartsjö, and though the invitation letters were written in an innocent style, the invited were to be arrested and tried before the high court. Arrested at Svartsjö were, in order of their arrival, Nils Sture's brother Erik Svantesson Sture, Abraham Stenbock, Sten Banér, Ivar Ivarsson, Sten Eriksson and Svante Sture. When it was announced that the riksdag would be postponed to 18 May and was to deal with an uncovered conspiracy against the king, the remaining suspected nobles refrained from following the king's invitation, namely Per Brahe, Gustaf Stenbock, Abraham Stenbock's brother Erik, Ture Bielke and his nephew Hogenskild Bielke, Clas Fleming, and Clas Åkesson Tott.

The trial in Svartsjö is not documented, but the verdict that the estates were to sign at Uppsala has survived. In the verdict, the following accounts are recorded as evidence:

- German merchant Peter Gastorp said that in Germany, he had heard from Josua Genewitz that when Nils Sture left Stockholm for Lorraine, Clas Åkesson Tott, Abraham Gustafsson Stenbock, Ivar Ivarsson and said Josua Genewitz had met on Sture's vessel and conspired to take the king's life and crown
- the king's organist, Alexander, said that he had heard the same in the German town of "Ryvold"
- a Paulus Schmied swore that Nils Sture and Josua Genewitz had started machinations against the king upon their arrival in Stralsund, and rumors about the intrigue were heard across Germany
- two servants of Abraham Gustafsson and Ivar Ivarsson, Hans Wolf and Christopher, said that they had heard how the servant of Svante Sture, Hans Ellers, had said that their masters had talked behind closed doors, and that from what he had heard, they were out to avenge Nils Sture's mistreatment
- Magnus II, Duke of Saxe-Lauenburg, cousin of Erik XIV and future husband of Erik's half-sister Sophia, said that Sten Eriksson, Abraham Gustafsson and Ivar Ivarsson had had an outraged conversation in his presence about Nils Sture's humiliation and called for revenge; the accused confirmed this, but said that they had talked about revenge against Persson and Jacob Teit of the high court, not against the king.

Abraham Stenbock was forced to sign an incriminating letter to Josua Genewitz, which was later presented as evidence. From the diary of Erik XIV, it is known that Stenbock and Ivar Ivarsson were sentenced to death right away, and that on 14 May the court let Erik know that it was willing to also sentence Svante Sture to death. According to Peterson, Erik Sture was sentenced to death, too. All prisoners were then sent to Uppsala Castle for further investigation.

During the Svartsjö trials, Martha Leijonhufvud, married to Svante Sture, had traveled to Svartsjö with her daughter, Anna, to seek an audience with the king, but they were not allowed in the castle and instead placed under guard in the village outside. Martha sent an appeal to Karin Månsdotter to speak to the king in favor of the prisoners, and she also sent an appeal to the king's daughter, Virginia Eriksdotter. When the prisoners were transferred to Uppsala, Martha was also taken there under guard and placed in house arrest in a house belonging to the Sture family. Also present in Uppsala were Ebba Lilliehöök, married to Erik Leijonhufvud.

=== Riksdag at Uppsala ===
When Erik XIV arrived at Uppsala on 16 May 1567, according to Robert Nisbet Bain he was "in a condition of incipient insanity". The riksdag had meanwhile assembled, but only twenty nobles were among the attendees. On 19 May, when the death sentences were supposed to be endorsed by the riksdag, Erik collapsed after losing his notes for his speech and failing to manage without them. Two days later, Nils Sture was arrested upon his return from Lorraine by Persson, who denied him a requested audience with the king. On 22 May, Erik wrote a letter to Svante Sture, rejecting the charges of treason brought up against the Sture family and announcing their reconciliation.

== Killings ==
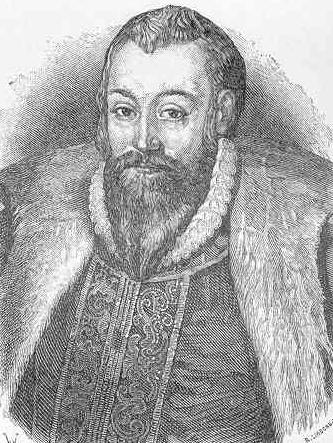
Svante Sture

In Uppsala, Martha Leijonhufvud again appealed to Karin Månsdotter, and on the morning of 24 May, Karin sent for her and met her in the Uppsala Castle, where she told her that the king had promised her not to hurt the prisoners.

That same day, Erik XIV had Sten Eriksson accompany him on a visit to Svante Sture's cell. On his knees, the king begged Sture's forgiveness, admitting that he had done him wrong and promising full reconciliation. He then left the castle. Peterson says that on his way out, Erik had a conversation with Jöran Persson, while according to Geijer, Erik went for a walk with Petrus Caroli, ordinary of Kalmar, who told him that his brother John had started a rebellion.

Erik returned to the castle a few hours after his first visit, drew his dagger, and stabbed Nils Sture in his chest or arm. According to Geijer, the murder was finished by Peder Welamsson, a nephew of Persson, whereupon Erik again entered the cell of Svante Sture, announcing to him on his knees that now he had to kill him as he could not expect Sture to forgive him. Before leaving the castle for the second time, he ordered the guards to kill everyone except for "Herr Sten." The guards, led by Per (Peder) Gadd, executed the order, but spared Sten Banér and Sten Eriksson as they did not know which Sten the king had just referred to.

While these two survived, Svante Sture, Nils Sture, Erik Sture, Abraham Stenbock and Ivar Ivarsson were killed. Outside the castle, Erik's tutor Dionysius Beurreus (Note: also spelled "Burreus", "Beurraeus" or "Denis Burrey". Born in France, he received an estate in Sweden in 1547 and became Erik XIV's teacher in 1553; later, he became Privy Counsellor and rentmeister (master of the bursary); Beurreus also furthered Erik's interest in astrology and Calvinism.) found the king in a state of madness. Beurreus' efforts to calm him were to no avail – instead, the king issued an order to kill Beurreus as well and vanished into a nearby forest. Eventually the guards stabbed Beurreus to death. The killings were not made public; the castle was locked, and at the gate Per Gadd's guards continued to accept food for the prisoners from their relatives as usual.

== Aftermath ==
External images
- Clothes worn by the Stures by the time of their murder (Uppsala Cathedral exhibits)
- Sturemordet by Gustaf Cederström (1880). Painting of Erik XIV stabbing Nils Sture (Uppsala Castle exhibit)

Erik did not return, but spent the following days wandering about the woods on his own. Only on 27 May he was found, dressed as a peasant and still in mental disorder, at the village of Odensala and brought to Stockholm. Persson had meanwhile succeeded in obtaining the riksdag decree of 26 May endorsing all past and future sentences against the nobles detained in Svartsjö and Uppsala – it is unclear whether the riksdag attendees knew at this time that most of the prisoners in Uppsala were already dead.

After having been brought back to the capital, Erik was initially left isolated, as no one dared to seek audience in fear of him having another fit. Word was sent to Uppsala for Erik's stepmother Queen Dowager Catherine Stenbock, who was related to several of the victims, and who had arrived to the city of Uppsala on the day of the murders. She was escorted to Stockholm by Sten Leijonhufvud and Hogenskild Bielke. Upon her arrival, she became the first person to be granted an audience with Erik after the murders, and found the rest of the court awaiting her. Being escorted in to the audience chamber, Erik reportedly fell to his knee before her and begged forgiveness for the murders. He issued a written power of attorney for her to negotiate a settlement between Erik and the families of the murder victims. Catherine Stenbock soon presented the demands made by Martha Leijonhufvud, widow of Svante Sture and mother of Nils and Erik Sture. Martha Leijonhufvud demanded a letter of protection against further persecution from the king; an official statement of the innocence of the murder victims; economic compensation and, finally, the arrest of the people responsible for the behavior of the monarch, which was regarded to be his adviser Jöran Persson. The king accepted all terms of the settlement.

Erik remained in a state of madness for half a year, cared for by Karin Månsdotter, whom he married in the summer. Until his recovery late in 1567, the privy council assumed control of the government and had Persson tried and sentenced to death, although the verdict was not carried out. Upon his recovery, Erik XIV restored his own and Persson's power. In February 1568, during a campaign in Småland, Erik's secretary, Mårten Helsing (Note: also spelled "Martin Helsing" or "Martinus Olavi Helsingus"), made a disparaging comment about Persson, so outraging the king that he stabbed Helsing with a fire iron, causing injuries from which the secretary died on 7 April.

An uprising of nobles started in the summer of 1568, led by his brothers Charles and John, which led to Erik's being deposed in January 1569. Sten Eriksson, who had survived the Sture murders because of his name, was killed in the final battle of the uprising. (Note: The other Sten who had survived the murders, Sten Axelsson Banér, lived almost another 33 years before he was publicly executed on the order of Charles IX in the Linköping Bloodbath of 20 March 1600.) Jöran Persson was killed by the insurgents in the same uprising when the Stockholm garrison deserted Erik XIV and turned in Persson.

Erik died in 1577 from arsenic supposedly mixed in pea soup; until his death, according to Scott (1992), he "was taken from one castle prison to another, first with his family then alone, occasionally sane, sometimes lapsing into insanity." On 10 March 1575, the privy council had issued a document calling for the murder of Erik in case he could not be kept safely in prison; among the signatories were several nobles whom Erik had failed to capture at Svartsjö in 1567, namely Per Brahe, Ture Bielke, Hogenskild Bielke and Erik Gustafsson Stenbock, and also Sten Banér's brother, Gustaf. (Note: Gustaf Banér, Per Brahe and Ture Bielke later shared the fate of Sten Banér: they were likewise executed in the "Linköping Bloodbath.)

The clothes worn by Svante, Nils, and Erik Sture at the time of their deaths were kept by Märta (Martha), Svante's wife and the mother of Nils and Erik, and are now on display in Uppsala Cathedral's northern tower.
