= Torpa Castle =

- Torpa stenhus
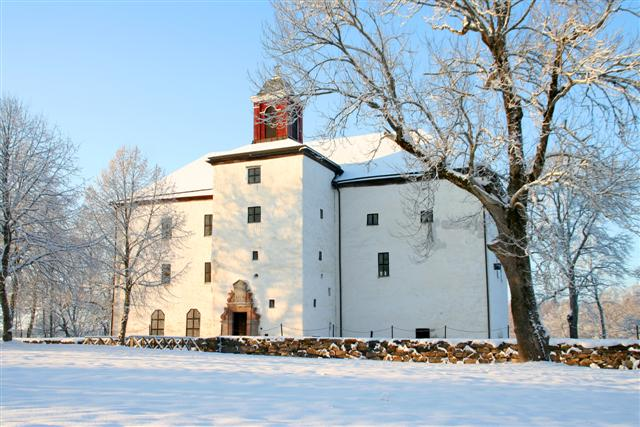
- Torpa Castle during winter.
- Interactive map of the Torpa Castle area

General information
- Architectural style: Renaissance, baroque
- Location: Länghem, Sweden
- Coordinates: 57°39′00″N 13°16′46″E
- Construction started: 1470

Website
- https://www.torpastenhus.se/

Torpa Castle (Swedish: Torpa stenhus) is a well-preserved medieval building near lake Åsunden, in the county of Västra Götaland, southern Sweden.

== History ==
The first stone house was built around 1470 by Privy Councillor Arvid Knutsson as a fortress against the Danes. Reconstruction and remodeling of the fortress was done during the 1500s and 1600s, for example the staircase tower, built in the middle of the 16th century. The castle has a well-preserved Renaissance interior with grisaille wall paintings. The chapel on the ground floor was decorated in the late 17th century in a baroque style. The castle is best known as the home of the noble family Stenbock. It was the residence of Catherine Stenbock, third and last consort of King Gustav Vasa.

== The castle today ==
In recent years, the castle has been undergoing an interior reconstruction, with the original wooden walls reinstalled. These were torn down when the building was used as a granary in the 19th century. The use as a granary is also the reason why the castle is so well preserved, despite being uninhabited for a long time, since this activity required a completely tight roof.

Today the castle can be seen with guided tours.

== See also ==
- List of castles and palaces in Sweden
