= 1543 in Sweden =

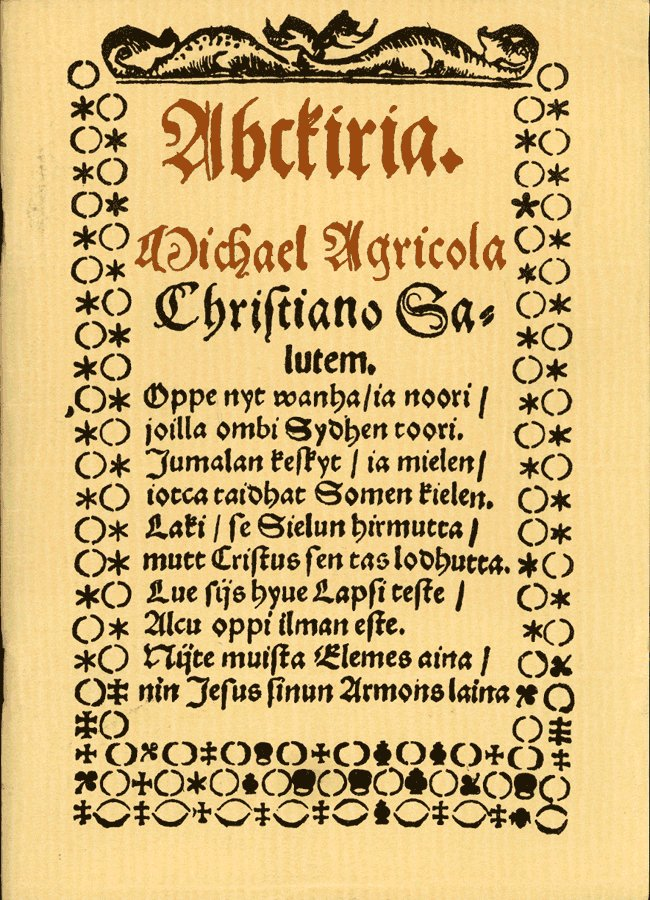
The first page of Abckiria.

Events from the year 1543 in Sweden

== Incumbents ==
- Monarch – Gustav I

== Events ==
- - The Dacke War is put to an end
- - Conrad von Pyhy is deposed office.
- - The first book in the Finnish language is published: Abckiria by Mikael Agricola.
- - The monarch has the library and archives of the Vadstena Abbey sealed and removed.

== Births ==
- - Nils Svantesson Sture, diplomat (died 1567)

== Deaths ==
- - Nils Dacke, rebel leader
