= Martha Leijonhufvud =

Swedish noblewoman (1520–1584)

Martha Eriksdotter Leijonhufvud
- Born: 24 December 1520; Ödeby Lillkyrka, Ekeberg, Närke
- Died: 15 January 1584 (aged 63); Stegeholm
- Spouse: Svante Stensson Sture
- Issue: Sigrid Sture; Magdalena Sture; Anna Sture; Sten Sture; Nils Sture; Sten Sture; Erik Sture; Margareta Sture; Gustaf Sture; Brita Sture; Mauritz Sture; Karl Sture; Iliana Sture; Iliana Sture; Kristina Sture
- Father: Erik Abrahamsson Leijonhufvud
- Mother: Ebba Eriksdotter Vasa

Martha Eriksdotter Leijonhufvud (24 December 1520 in Ödeby Lillkyrka, Ekeberg, Närke – 15 January 1584 in Stegeholm), known as Kung Märta (lit. 'King Martha'), was a politically active Swedish noblewoman. She was the sister of Queen Margaret Leijonhufvud and sister-in-law of King Gustav Vasa: she was also the maternal aunt of Queen Catherine Stenbock and the daughter-in-law of the regent Christina Gyllenstierna. In 1568, she financed the deposition of King Erik XIV, which placed her nephew John III of Sweden on the throne.

== Biography ==
Martha was born to Erik Abrahamsson Leijonhufvud (d. 1520), a victim of the Stockholm Bloodbath, and Ebba Eriksdotter Vasa, and relative of Gustav Vasa, who became king of Sweden in 1523.

=== Marriage ===
Her sister Margaret was engaged to Svante Stensson Sture, the son of former regent Christina Gyllenstierna, but the engagement was broken in 1536 when king Gustav decided to marry her. Instead, Sture was married to Märta. There is a well known legend as to how this came about: Svante Sture threw himself at the feet of Margaret, and the king entered the room and discovered them. The king asked: "What is this?" Margaret replied: "My lord Sture is asking me for the hand of my sister Märta!", at which the king said: "Granted!"

Martha and Svante Stensson Sture were married 3 March 1538 at Nyköping Castle. By marriage, she became the wife of the head of the most powerful family in Sweden after the royal family, as Svante Sture was considered the highest ranking nobleman in the realm, and in addition to being the sister of the queen, she became one of the highest ranking women in Sweden next after the royal women.

=== King Martha ===
Like her sister, Märta was almost always pregnant, giving birth to at least fifteen children in just twenty-one years, but only ten of them lived to adulthood. She and Sture resided in Stegeborg Castle. In 1542, Stegeborg was besieged by Nils Dacke during the Dacke War, and Dacke offered the couple to become the king and queen of Sweden. They denied the offer.

Svante was often absent on his official missions: he became marshal in 1543 and commander in Finland in 1556, and governor of Livonia and Reval in 1562. During his absence, Märta took the responsibility for Stegeborg and his estates, and her dominance earned her the nickname King Märta, by which she is known in history. As such, she is known to have exerted her authority in the justice system in her fiefs and appointing local officials.

As the sister of the Queen and by marriage to the head of one of the most prestigious families in Sweden, Martha had a position of high status and participated in certain ceremonies in court life. Martha, as well as her sister Brita and her mother-in-law, often took care of the royal children. After the death of her sister, the queen, in 1551, the royal children were placed in the care of her and her sister Brita, after her mother-in-law Christina Gyllenstierna had asked to be relieved of the duty, until the King's remarriage to the daughter of Brita, Martha's niece Catherine Stenbock. Martha used both her sister and later her niece, Queens in succession, successfully as her channel to the monarch.

In 1561, King Erik XIV introduced the new title of count in Sweden at his coronation, and her husband was created one of Sweden's first three counts, making Märta the first countess in Sweden. King Eric, however, feared that the Sture family had desires on the throne, and during his reign, they also became a center of the opposition within the nobility.

=== The Sture murders ===
Eric XIV eyed Martha and the Sture family with suspicion. The Vasa dynasty was not regarded to have the same right to the Swedish throne as did the Sture family, which members had on several occasions had the position of regent of Sweden during the former century. Despite this, Martha's spouse Svante and her sons Erik and Nils was appointed to serve in the Northern Seven Years' War (1563–1570).

In 1565, her son Nils was accused of treason and forced to a humiliating entry to the capital. He was acquitted by the court, but the case created hostility among the nobility toward the King. The King therefore had Svante Sture and his sons Nils and Erik imprisoned, along with several other noblemen. In August 1566, Martha's son wrote to her: "I do hope to be able to defend myself with other things than letter and seal", which hinted preparations of a conspiracy. In May 1567, Erik XIV assembled court at Svartsjö Castle to judge the noblemen he had imprisoned there for treason. Martha traveled to Svartsjö with her daughter Anna to seek an audience with the King, but they were not allowed in the castle and instead placed under guard in the village outside the castle. Martha sent an appeal to Karin Månsdotter to speak to the King in favor of the prisoners, and she also sent an appeal to the King's daughter Virginia Eriksdotter. The same month, the prisoners were transferred by boat from Svartsjö to Uppsala to be judged. Martha was also brought to Uppsala under guard by boat, during which she was reportedly exposed to mockery by the public. After they arrived in Uppsala, Martha was escorted to the residence of the family in the city and placed under house arrest. Her sister-in-law Ebba Lilliehöök were present there for the same reason.

In Uppsala, Martha again appealed to Karin Månsdotter, and on the morning of 24 May, Karin sent for her and met her in Uppsala Castle and told her that the King had promised her not to hurt the prisoners. Reportedly, the King hesitated due to the efforts of Karin. Later that same day, though, he suffered a fit and stabbed Nils Sture to death. He ordered for the rest of the prisoners to be killed with the exception of "Lord Sten", which resulted in the killings of the spouse and second son of Martha, Svante and Erik, as well as two more noblemen, while Sten Eriksson Leijonhufvud and Sten Axelsson Banér were spared because of the order of the King to spare "Lord Sten", and as it was unknown which Lord Sten he meant, both by that name were spared. The same day, her niece, Queen Dowager Catherine, arrived in Uppsala, and was given the task to tell Martha what had happened.

The clothes worn by Svante, Nils and Erik Sture at the time of their deaths were kept by Martha, and are now on display in Uppsala Cathedral's northern tower.

=== The Duke's Rebellion ===
After the Sture Murders, the King disappeared, and was found in a bad state outside of the city three days later. He was calmed by Karin Månsdotter and brought back to the capital, where he was isolated for several weeks. The first audience was granted to Queen Dowager Catherine, who was given the task to act as mediator between the King and the relatives of the murder victims, and presented with a written document giving her the authority to negotiate the Settlement (litigation) with the relatives of the murder victims, among them her aunt Martha Leijonhufvud. Through Catherine, Martha Leijonhufvud put forward her demands for a letter of protection against further persecution by the King; an official statement of the innocence of the murder victims; economic compensation and the arrest of the people truly responsible for the behavior of the monarch, which was regarded to be his adviser Jöran Persson. The King accepted all terms of the settlement, though he soon reinstated Persson. The settlement was signed by Martha and the other relations of the victims, the King arranged a grand funeral for the victims on 4 July, and paid Martha fines of compensation in silver bricks. Martha placed the bloody clothes worn by her spouse and sons upon their graves in the church.

After the King recovered his sanity, he demanded back the compensation given to the murder victims in a new tax to pay for his controversial wedding with the commoner Karin Månsdotter, a marriage regarded as a scandal and insult by the nobility. Martha refused, and instead, she used the "blood bricks", as she called the silver bricks, to finance the rebellion of the King's brothers, the Dukes, which led to the deposition of Erik XIV in 1568. She had the blood bricks melted to coins with the image of the King's brothers John and Charles in Vadstena, which were used to equip the Dukes' troops, and had words spread about the atrocities of the King through her acquaintances in Europe to justify the coup, which successfully replaced Erik XIV with John III.

After the coup, John III granted Martha the former county of her spouse as a personal fief in 1570, now enlarged, which made her, alongside her sister Brita and sister-in-law Ebba Lilliehöök, one of the five greatest fief holders in Sweden.

=== Her daughter's elopement ===
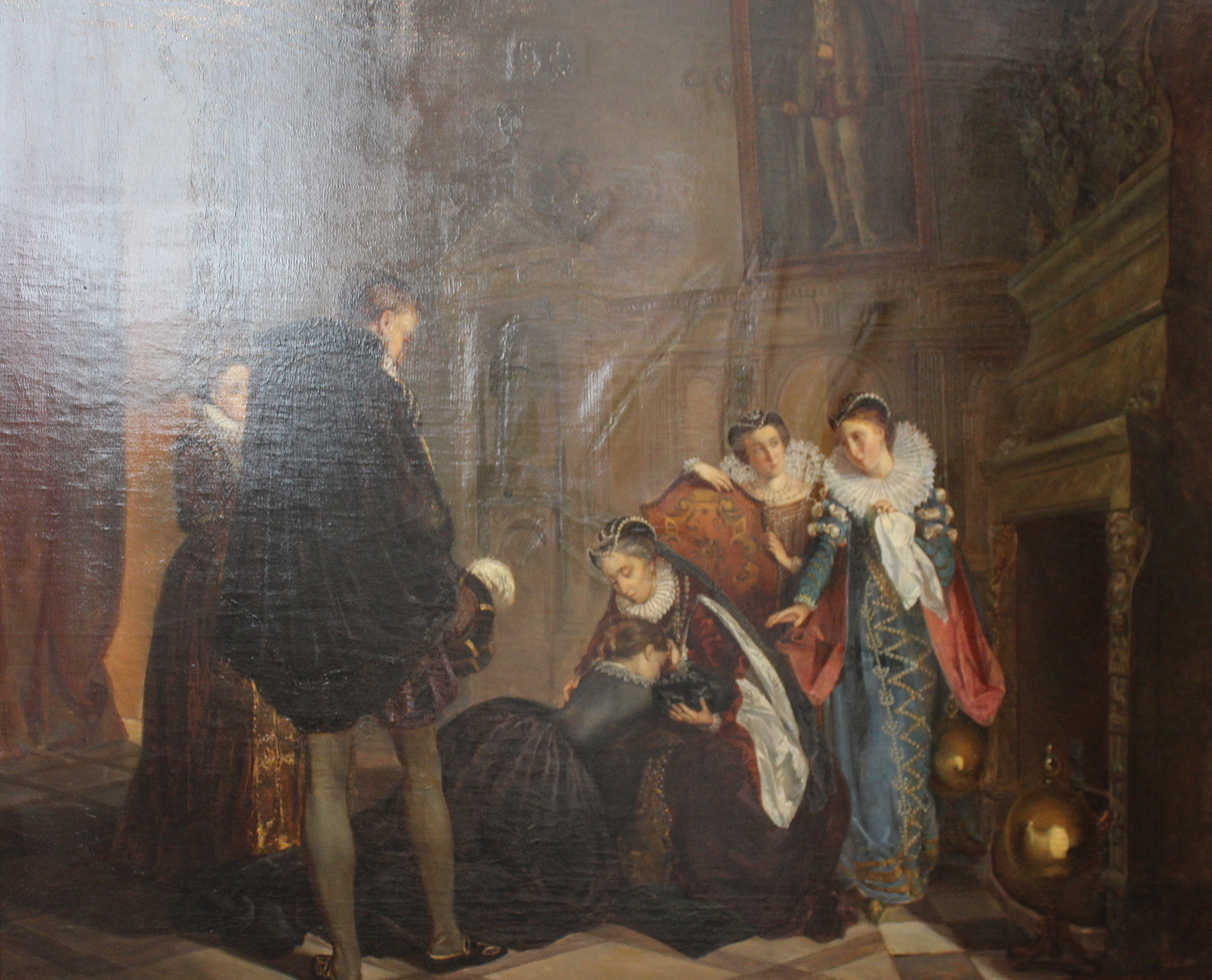
Malmöhus, Oskar Anderson, Malin Sture comes home

Her daughter, Malin (Magdalena), (1539–1610), was in love with her cousin, Erik Gustavsson Stenbock (1538–1602), and wished to marry him. Martha refused because they were cousins. In 1573, after ten years had passed without any change in the matter, Erik convinced Prince Charles to provide them with 200 men to help them elope. Erik asked Malin to take a trip on the sleigh with him, and when they were seated, the prince's guards came forward and the couple departed from the estate.

Martha convinced her royal nephew the king to arrest Erik and confiscate his property. He was eventually released and his property was restored to him, after the siblings and spouse of the king as well as his own family, among them his aunt (and Martha's niece) Queen Dowager Katarina Stenbock, had united in convincing the king to accede to it, and married Malin in 1574. According to the legend, it took one year of begging from the couple's relatives to convince Malin's powerful mother to forgive the couple for defying her authority; the women of the family begged her "crying upon their knees" before she agreed to see her daughter. According to legend, her daughter had to crawl on her knees up to her while pregnant.
