= Ebba Lilliehöök =

Swedish nobleman, landlord and county administrator (1529–1609)

Ebba Månsdotter Lilliehöök of Kolbäck (13 January 1529 – 29 September 1609), was a Swedish noblewoman, landlord, county administrator, Countess of Raseborg, Baroness of Gräfsnäs and Lady of Käggleholm.

== Biography ==
=== Early life ===
Ebba Lillehöök was born at Upplo Manor, Västergötland. She was the only child of the riksråd Måns Bryntesson Lilliehöök (d. 1529) and Brita Jönsdotter Roos of Ervalla. Her father participated in the Westrogothian rebellion and was executed for his ambitions to become king. Her mother remarried riksråd Kristoffer Andersson Röde. In 1543, she accompanied her mother and stepfather in exile in Germany after a conflict between her stepfather and the king. Upon the death of her father in 1548, the king asked them to return to Sweden: Ebba was the heiress of substantial estates after her father, and the king wanted her to marry his brother-in-law. After negotiations with the queen and a written assurance of safety, Ebba returned to Sweden with her mother in the summer of 1548 and spent her remaining time until her wedding as a lady-in-waiting to the queen.

=== Marriage ===
On 7 October 1548, she married the nobleman Sten Eriksson, Baron and Count Leijonhufvud (1518–1568) in the presence of the king at the Royal Palace in Stockholm. Her spouse was the brother-in-law of King Gustav I and the brother of Queen Margaret Leijonhufvud, which gave them both an influential position at the royal court. Upon the coronation of Erik XIV in 1561, her spouse was created a baron.

In 1567, her spouse was one of two of the group of imprisoned nobles to survive the infamous Sture murders, which killed among others the spouse of her sister-in-law Martha Leijonhufvud. During the event, Ebba was present in Uppsala with her sister-in-law in Uppsala and placed under house arrest to prevent them from interfering. Ebba was held "in high regard and respect" by the brothers of the king, the future John III of Sweden and Charles IX of Sweden, and a personal friend of John's spouse Catherine Jagiellon. She and her spouse participated in convincing the royal brothers to rebel against the king, financed by her sister-in-law Martha Leijonhufvud, resulting in Erik XIV being replaced by John III in 1568.

=== "Count Ebba" ===
In 1568, her spouse was given the title of count on his death bed, having sustained an injury after being imprisoned by Erik XIV. Ebba received the title of countess and was in 1571 granted the County of Raseborg in Finland as a fief. She thereby became, alongside her sisters-in-law Brita and Martha Leijonhufvud, one of the five greatest fief holders in Sweden during the reign of John III. She was generally known as "Count Ebba", as it was said, for her "masculine" ways. Her feud with her son attracted a lot of attention, and there were a lot of stories about their many conflicts. On one occasion, in 1604 for example, there was a story about her son preventing her chef from serving her after having served him bad food on her orders. By her contemporaries, Count Ebba was described as: "A hair of the Devil himself, worse than her father, her son Axel and his sons". She herself commented about the ongoing conflict stating: "I am the mother and he is the son".

Count Ebba was also politically controversial. In 1592, she came into conflict with the current monarch and was warned for having spread rumours about the king. In 1607, she was placed under house arrest on her estates by the order of Charles IX. She was the paternal grandmother of Ebba Mauritzdotter Leijonhufvud.

Ebba Lilliehöök was the ancestral mother of the Lewenhaupt noble family.

== Death ==
Lilliehöök died at Lerjeholm in Angered parish, Älvsborg County.
