= Sture =

Swedish noble family

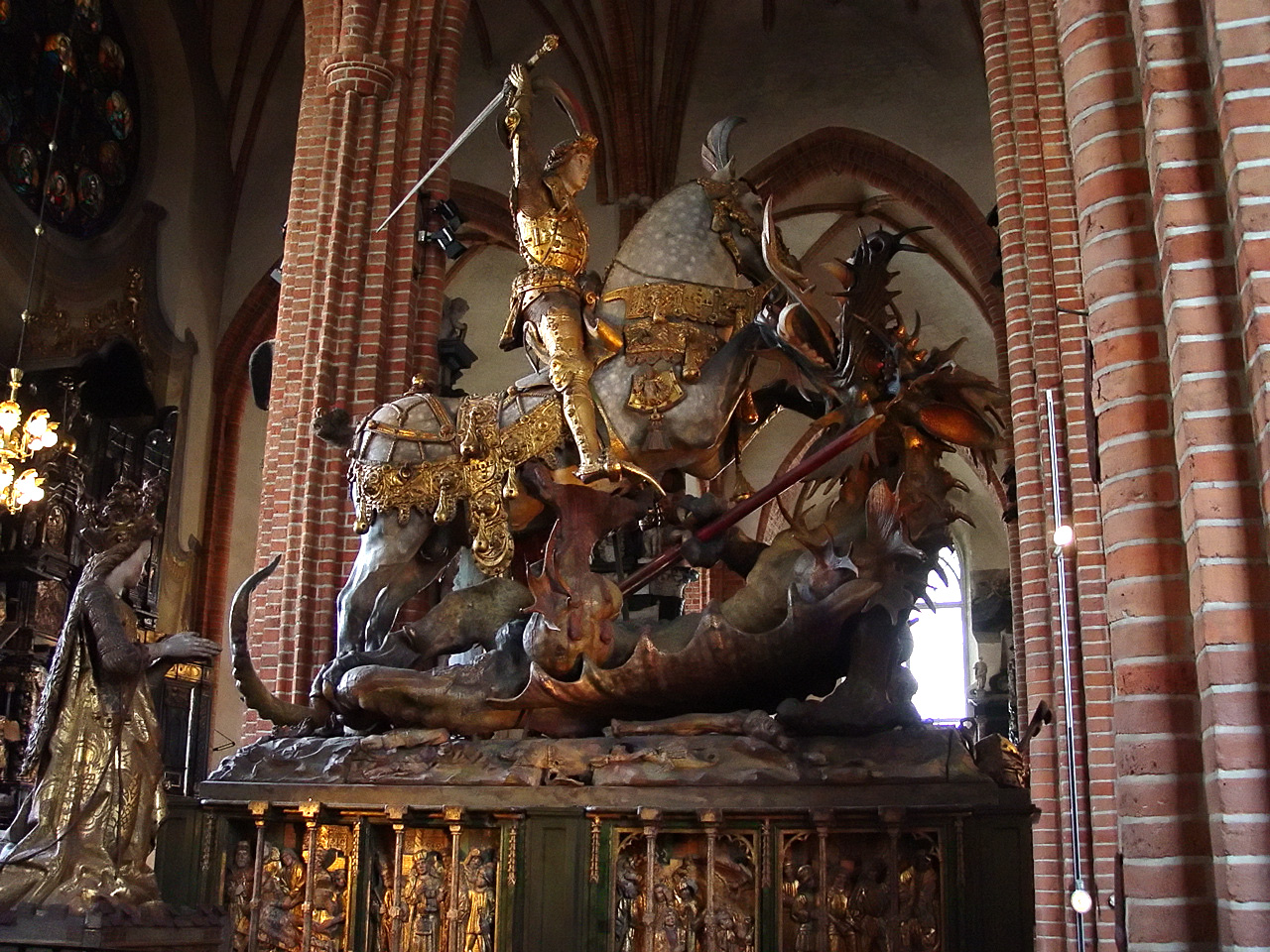
Saint George and the Dragon in the Stockholm cathedral Storkyrkan, original grave monument of Sten Sture the Elder depicting his victory over the Danes at the Battle of Brunkeberg

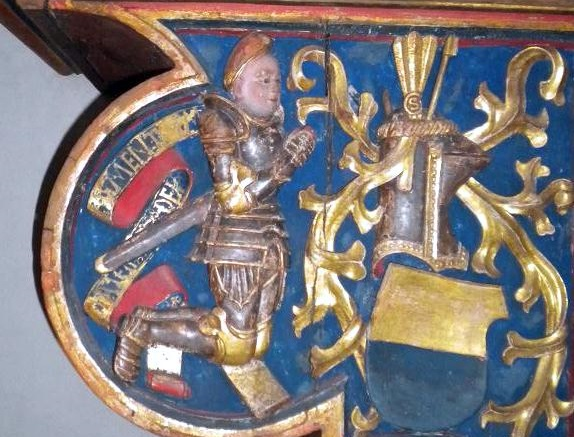
Contemporary sculpture of Sten Sture the younger at the altar of Västerås Cathedral

Sture (Swedish: [ˈstʉ̌ːrɛ]) was a name borne by three distinct but interrelated noble families in Sweden in the Late Middle Ages and Early Modern Period. It was originally a nickname, meaning 'haughty, proud' (compare the Swedish word stursk and the Old Norse and Icelandic personal name Sturla), but later became a surname. Particularly famous are the three regents (Swedish: riksföreståndare) from these families who ruled Sweden in succession during the fifty-year period between 1470 and 1520, namely:

- Sten Sture the Elder, regent 1470–1497 and 1501–1503
- Svante Nilsson, regent 1504–1512
- Sten Sture the Younger, regent 1512–1520

The Sture families are remembered in the names of Sturegatan ('Sture Street') and Stureplan ('Sture Square') in central Stockholm, and by the Sten Sture Monument in Uppsala, as well as Sture Cheese, which is produced by a dairy in Sävsjö, close to the main seat of the 'Younger Sture' family at Eksjöhovgård.

== Sture (Sjöblad) Family ==
Arms of the Sture (Sjöblad) family

The first Sture line to emerge is known in Swedish historiography as the Sjöblad Family (Swedish: Sjöbladsätten/Sjöbladssläkten) to differentiate it from later kin-groups with the name Sture, as its coat of arms bore three seeblätter (stylised water lilies), known in Swedish as sjöblad.

The earliest known member of the family was Anund Sture, a landowner from Västergötland who is first attested in 1310. He seems at the time to have been a loyalist of King Birger, but later defected to his brother and rival Erik Magnusson. After Erik's death, Anund served his son, King Magnus Eriksson.

Anund's great-great-grandson, Gustaf Algotsson Sture, lived a century later. Around 1438 he married Birgitta Stensdotter, a member of the Bielke family and half-sister to the powerful Marshal of the Realm, Karl Knutsson Bonde, who ten years later declared himself King of Sweden as Karl VIII.

Gustaf and Birgitta had a single son, Sten Gustafsson Sture, known retrospectively as Sten Sture the Elder to distinguish him from a later Sten Sture (for whom see below). He was one of his uncle King Karl's strongest supporters, and upon Karl's death in 1470 he was named regent (Swedish: riksföreståndare) and guardian to the king's infant son Karl Karlsson. Sten's position was initially shaky, but he quickly established his authority by defeating a Danish invasion at the Battle of Brunkeberg in 1471. He made no attempt to have Karl Karlsson crowned king, but nor did he seize the throne himself, and instead continued to rule the kingdom as regent for the next thirty-two years, albeit with an interruption in the period 1497–1501. He did not have any children, and so the Sjöblad line died with him when he died in 1503.

== Danish Sture Family ==
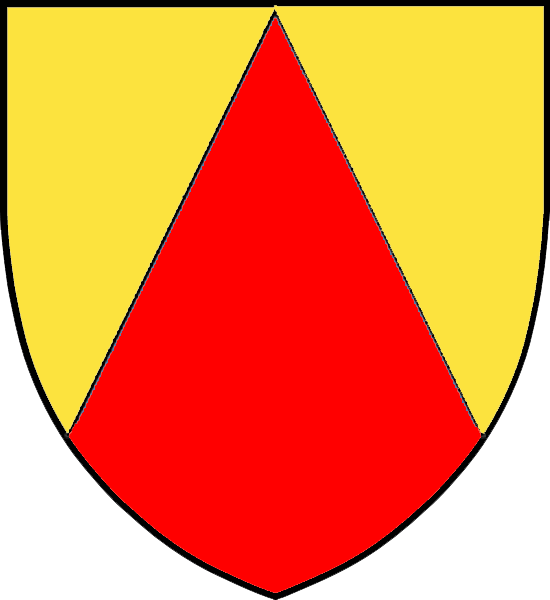
The spets nedifrån arms of the Danish Sture family

The second Sture family is usually known as the Danish Sture Family (Swedish: Danska Stureätten/Sturesläkten), as it originated from Halland, then part of Denmark; it is also sometimes referred to as Sture (Spets Nedifrån), i.e. 'Sture (tip up)', as its coat of arms resembles a spearhead pointing upwards. The earliest known member of the family was the knight Nils Sture, who is first attested in 1377 and 1392.

Nils's son, Sven Sture, was appointed by Queen Margaret to command her forces on Gotland in either 1395 or 1396. However, soon afterward he betrayed her and turned the island over to Erik Albrektsson, son of her archenemy Albert of Mecklenburg. Gotland subsequently became the principal base for the Vitalienbrüder, German privateers hired by the Mecklenburgers to harass Scandinavian shipping. In 1398 the Teutonic Order, frustrated that their ships were also being attacked by the pirates, decided to deal with the problem by invading Gotland. Sven Sture escaped with a group of Vitalienbrüder and established a new pirate base at Faxeholm in Hälsingland, but later that year he accepted a pardon from Queen Margaret and settled peacefully at Eksjö (present-day Eksjöhovgård) in Småland. Sven does not seem to have had any sons, and so the Danish Sture line died with him. However, he did leave a daughter, Katarina, who married Bo Stensson of the Natt och Dag family.

== Younger Sture Family (Natt och Dag) ==
Arms of the Natt och Dag family, also borne by the Younger Sture family.

After Sven Sture's death, his castle at Eksjö was inherited first by his son-in-law Bo Stensson (Natt och Dag), and then by Bo's son Nils. Nils subsequently adopted his grandfather's surname, calling himself Nils Bosson Sture, and thus founded a third Sture line, traditionally referred to as the 'Younger Sture Family' (Swedish: Yngre Stureätten/Sturesläkten), though he nevertheless continued to use the same Natt och Dag arms as his father and other paternal relatives. As a result, the Younger Sture Family is usually considered an offshoot of the Natt och Dag rather than a continuation of the Danish Sture line.

To make matters even more confusing, Nils's Natt och Dag ancestors were linked by marriage to the Sture (Sjöblad) family. Thus Nils Bosson Sture and Sten Sture the Elder were distant cousins (Sten's great-grandmother Märta Bosdotter was also Nils's great-aunt), but their shared surname of Sture came from unrelated ancestors. Nils was initially one of Sten's most prominent supporters, but the two men later became estranged, and by the time of his death Nils was a leading member of the unionist opposition to Sten's regency.

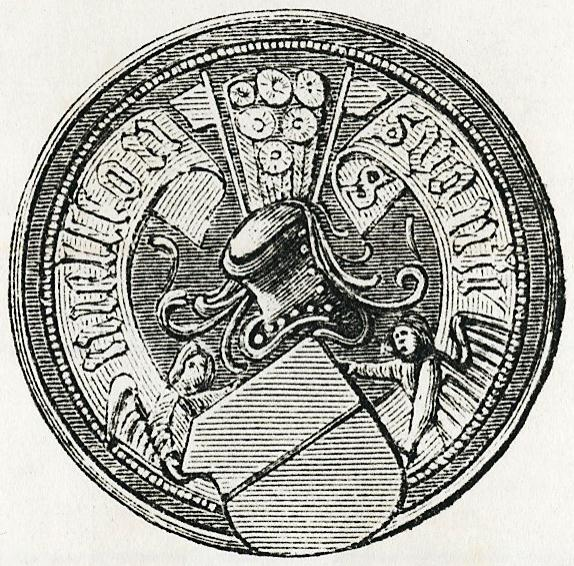
Seal of Svante Nilsson

Nils's son Svante rejected the surname Sture, instead simply styling himself 'Svante Nilsson'. This may have been a gesture of opposition to Sten Sture, to whom he was initially hostile as his father had been. As such he was one of the leaders of the 1497 rebellion which deposed Sten as regent and invited in King Hans of Denmark to rule Sweden instead, thereby restoring the Kalmar Union. Hans, however, alienated Svante and other erstwhile opponents of Sten by his clumsy attempts to play the different Swedish factions off against each other in order to increase his own power, and in 1501 Svante helped Sten to foment a rebellion which led to the expulsion of Hans's troops and Sten's restoration as regent. After Sten died in 1503, Svante succeeded him as regent, and ruled Sweden until his own death a decade later.

Svante's son Sten Svantesson succeeded him as regent, and revived the Sture surname in order to associate himself with the memory of Sten Sture the Elder; he is therefore known to history as Sten Sture the Younger. The younger Sten ruled Sweden for eight years before being defeated and killed by Christian II of Denmark at the Battle of Bogesund.

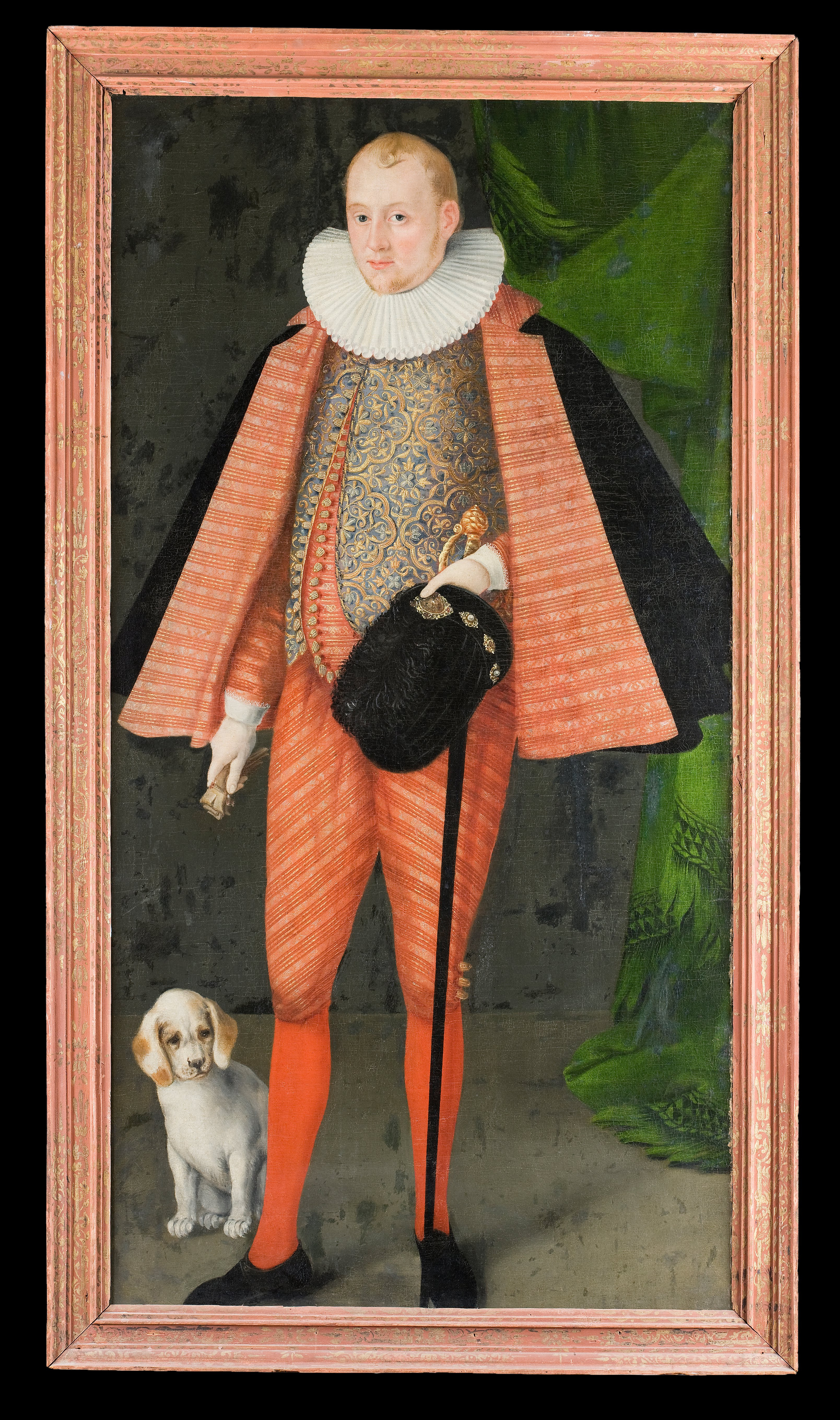
Svante Mauritzson Sture (1587–1616), the last of the Stures.

The regent's sons, Nils Stensson and Svante Stensson, were both captured by the Danes and imprisoned in Copenhagen. In their absence, a nobleman called Gustav Eriksson Vasa led a successful rebellion against Christian and declared himself King of Sweden in 1523. The following year the Stenssons were released by the new Danish king, Frederick I, and returned to Sweden. It appears Nils died soon afterward, but an apparent impostor, the so-called Daljunker, led an abortive revolt against Gustav in 1527–8. Gustav died in 1560, and was succeeded by his son King Erik XIV. Erik soon became suspicious of Svante and his eldest son Nils Svantesson, whom he believed was plotting to usurp the throne, and in 1567 he had them arrested along with Nils's brother Erik and then personally killed all three of them in a violent outburst known to history as the Sture Murders.

Svante's youngest son, Mauritz, managed to avoid the king's suspicions due to his youth. He later had a son called Svante, but Svante Mauritzson failed to have children of his own, and so the Younger Sture family died with him in 1616.

=== Revived Sture Line ===
The Younger Stures were survived by their cousins in the main Natt och Dag line, descended from Bo Stensson's elder brother Bengt Stensson. One of Bengt's descendants, Sten Arfvidsson (1681–1730), was an officer in the Swedish Army during the Great Northern War, rising to the rank of Major-General and marrying a daughter of the prominent statesman Carl Piper. He was ennobled in 1720 as Baron Sture, thus establishing a new Sture line. This iteration of the Sture family died out in 1875, but the principal Natt och Dag line survives to the present day, and is indeed reckoned to be the oldest surviving family within the Swedish nobility.

== Sture Party ==
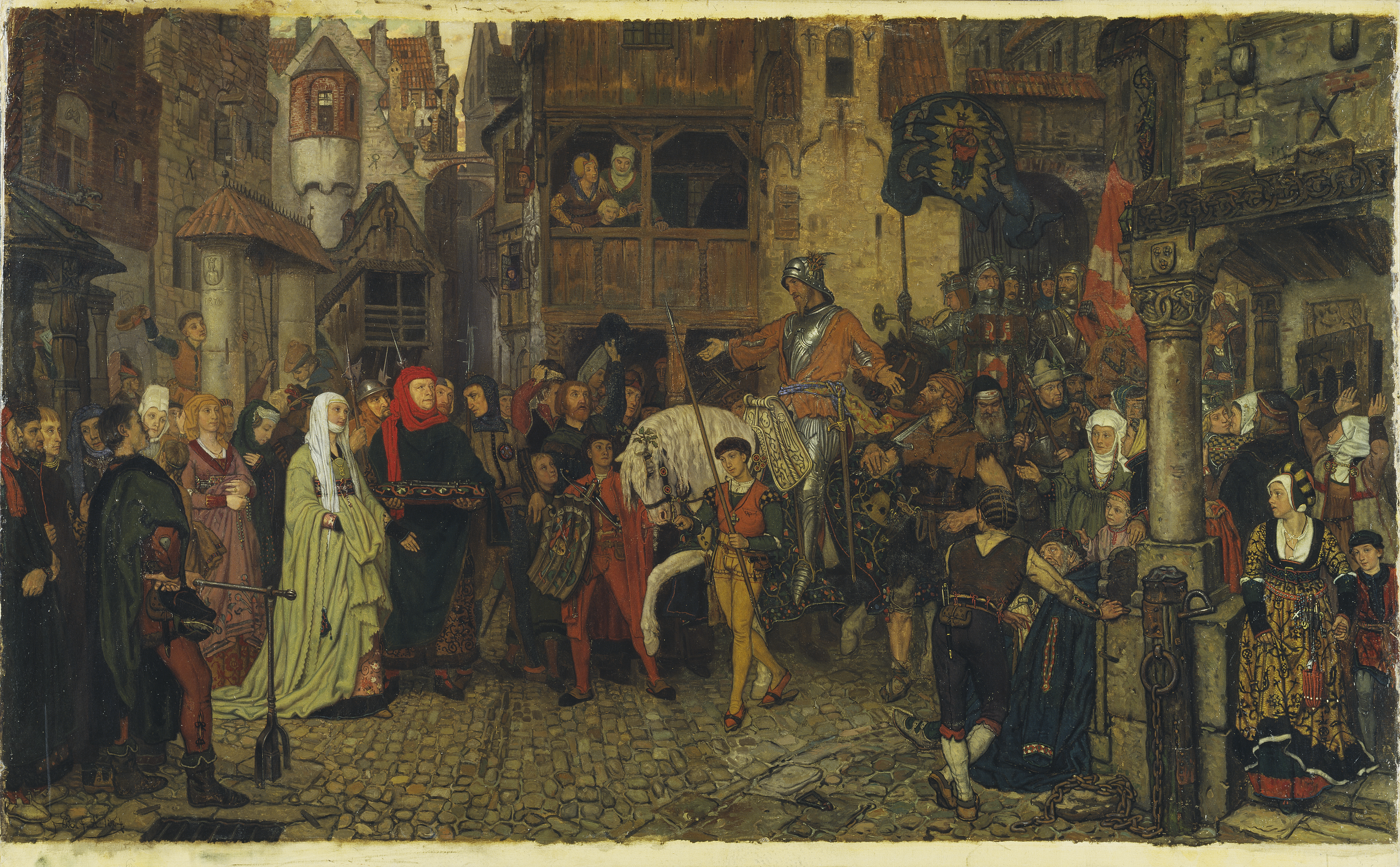
The Entry of Sten Sture the Elder into Stockholm, Georg von Rosen (1864).

Sten Sture the Elder, Svante Nilsson and Sten Sture the Younger are often known collectively as 'the Stures' (Swedish: Sturarna), even though Svante never used the surname himself and seems to have considered himself a Natt och Dag rather than a Sture. The faction within Swedish society which supported the three regents in their efforts to maintain de facto Swedish independence from the Kalmar Union are known to historians as the Sture Party (Sturepartiet) or the Sture Men (Sturemän), though neither term was used at the time.

Marxist historiography saw the conflict between the Sture Party and Swedish unionists as a class struggle between a generally unionist aristocracy and Church on the one hand, and a separatist-leaning peasantry and bourgeoisie on the other, with the latter social groups forming the backbone of the Sture Party. However, more recent historians have instead tended to stress the fact that factional allegiances were often unstable, and seem to have depended more on personal relationships and political circumstances rather than social station or a fixed ideological outlook.

== See also ==
- List of Swedish monarchs
- Natt och Dag
- Sture murders

== Sources ==
- "Sture" . New International Encyclopedia. 1905.
- Bain, Robert Nisbet (1911). "Sture" . Encyclopædia Britannica. Vol. 25 (11th ed.). pp. 1051–1052.
