= Battle of Runafer =

Polish-Sweden battle

- Part of the Northern Seven Years' War and the Polish–Swedish War (1563–1568)
Date	3 February 1567
Location	Runafer, Livonia 59°25′N 24°46′E
Result	Polish–Lithuanian victory

Belligerents
Sweden	Polish–Lithuanian union

Commanders and leaders
Henrik Klasson Horn	Mikołaj Talwosz

Casualties and losses
2,000 killed	Unknown

The Battle of Runafer (in Polish: Bitwa pod Kirempą) took place on 3 February 1567 near Reval (now Tallinn) during the Polish–Swedish War (1563–1568). The clash took place between Swedish forces led by Henrik Klasson Horn af Kanckas and Polish forces under the command of fältöverste Talwosa. The Swedes suffered defeat, losing 2,000 men. The battle was part of a wider conflict for dominance in the Baltic region, where the two countries fought for control of Livonia.

In 1566, Erik XIV commissioned Henrik Horn to recover Pärnu from the hands of the Poles or to ravage the Diocese of Riga to prevent a Polish attack on Swedish territory. Klas Kursell was to carry out raids in the Diocese of Riga, but attempts to recapture Pernau failed. In early 1567, the Poles, in response to the raids, attacked Swedish territory. On 3 February 1567, Swedish forces clashed with the Poles at Runafer, suffering a heavy defeat. The Estonian nobility, on military duty for the first time, suffered heavy losses due to poor commitment. Total Swedish losses were estimated at 2,000 men. After the victory, the Poles continued to plunder Swedish territory, but lacked the resources to take full advantage of the success. Henrik Horn was replaced by Kursell as commander of the Swedish forces in Estonia after losing the royal trust. During the battle, the knight Johann Maydell Goswinsson was captured. Talwos was not able to exploit his victory due to a lack of resources.
