= Stenbock =

Swedish noble family

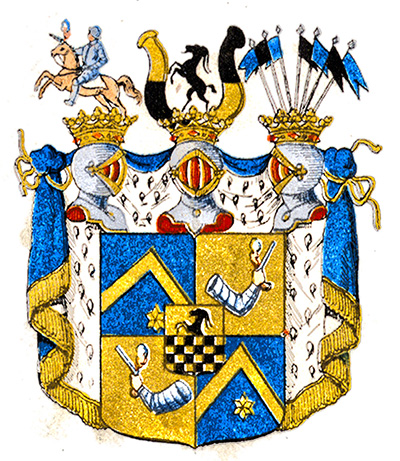
Coat of arms of Counts Stenbock

The Stenbock family is an old Swedish noble family, of which one younger branch established itself in Finland and another younger branch in Estonia, both of them in the mid 18th century, of which the first was entered into the rolls of the Finnish House of Nobility and the latter received both Estonian and Russian letters of nobility.

== Notable members ==
- Ebba Stenbock (15??–1614)
- Catherine Stenbock (1535–1621)
- Gustaf Otto Stenbock (1614–1685)
- Magdalena Stenbock (1649–1727)
- Hedvig Eleonora Stenbock (1658–1714)
- Magnus Stenbock (1664–1717)
- Eric Stenbock (1860–1895)

== Gallery ==
Arms of the Swedish counts Stenbock, the main branch of the family

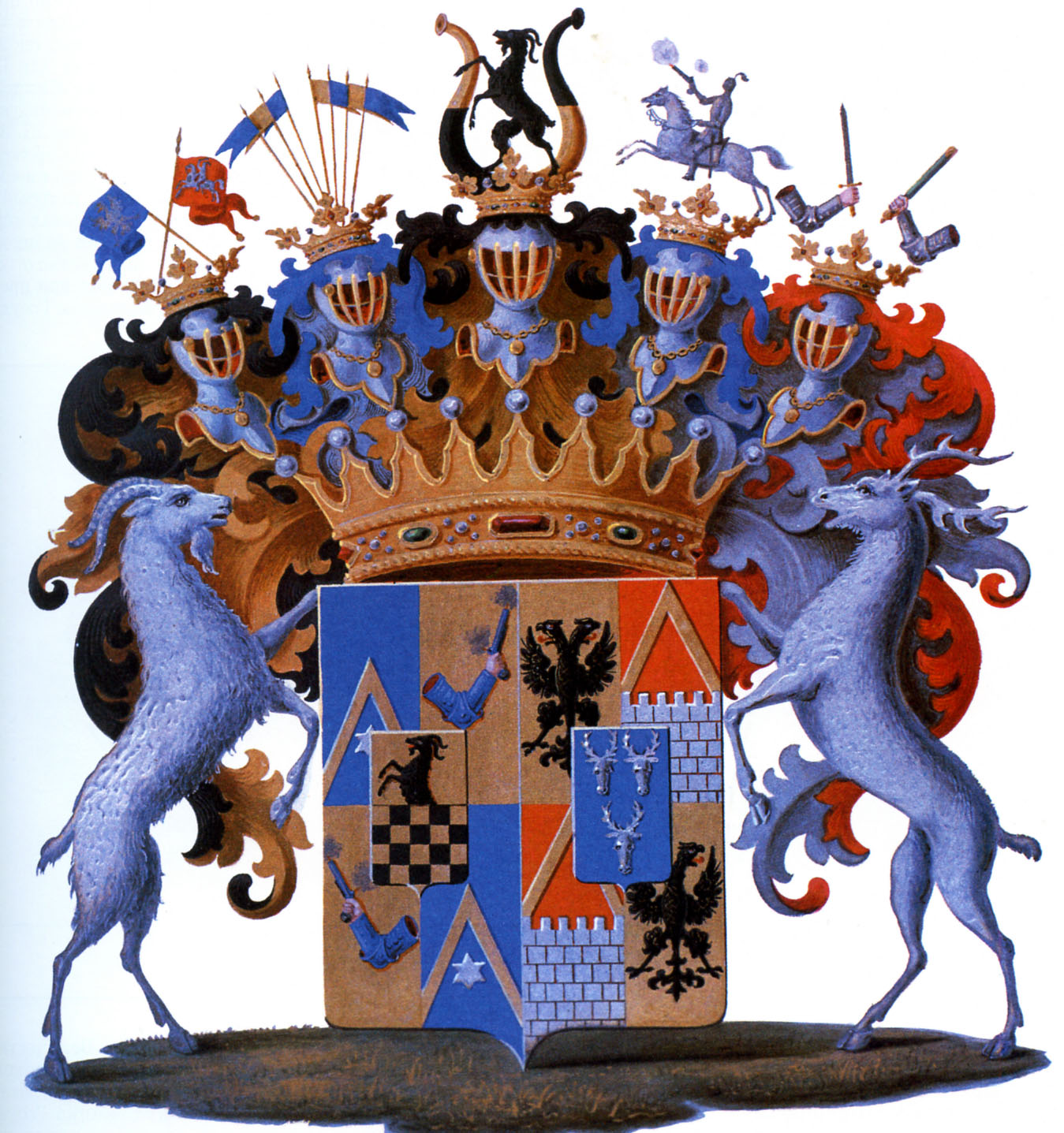
Arms of the Stenbock-Fermor branch of the family

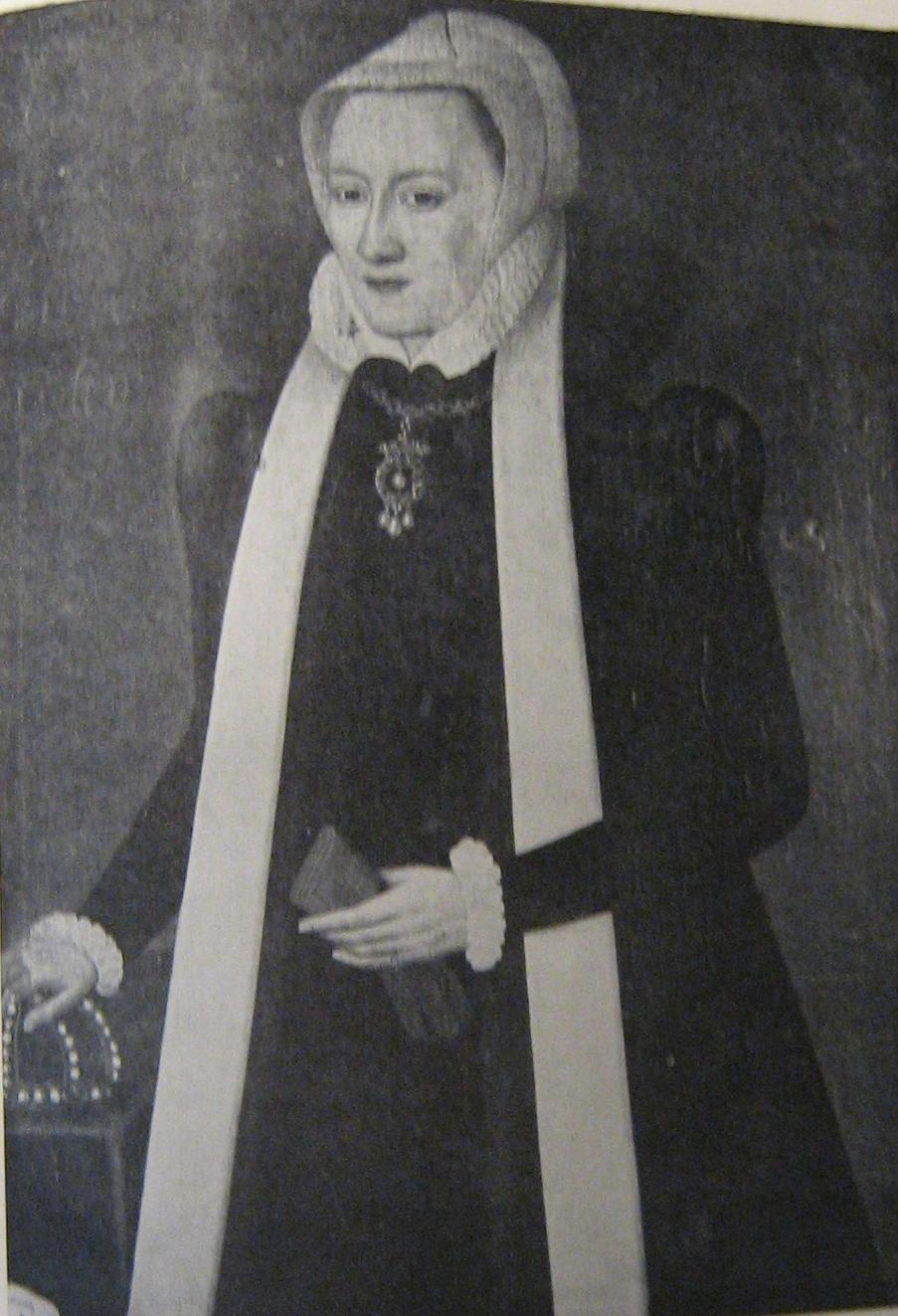
Catherine Stenbock

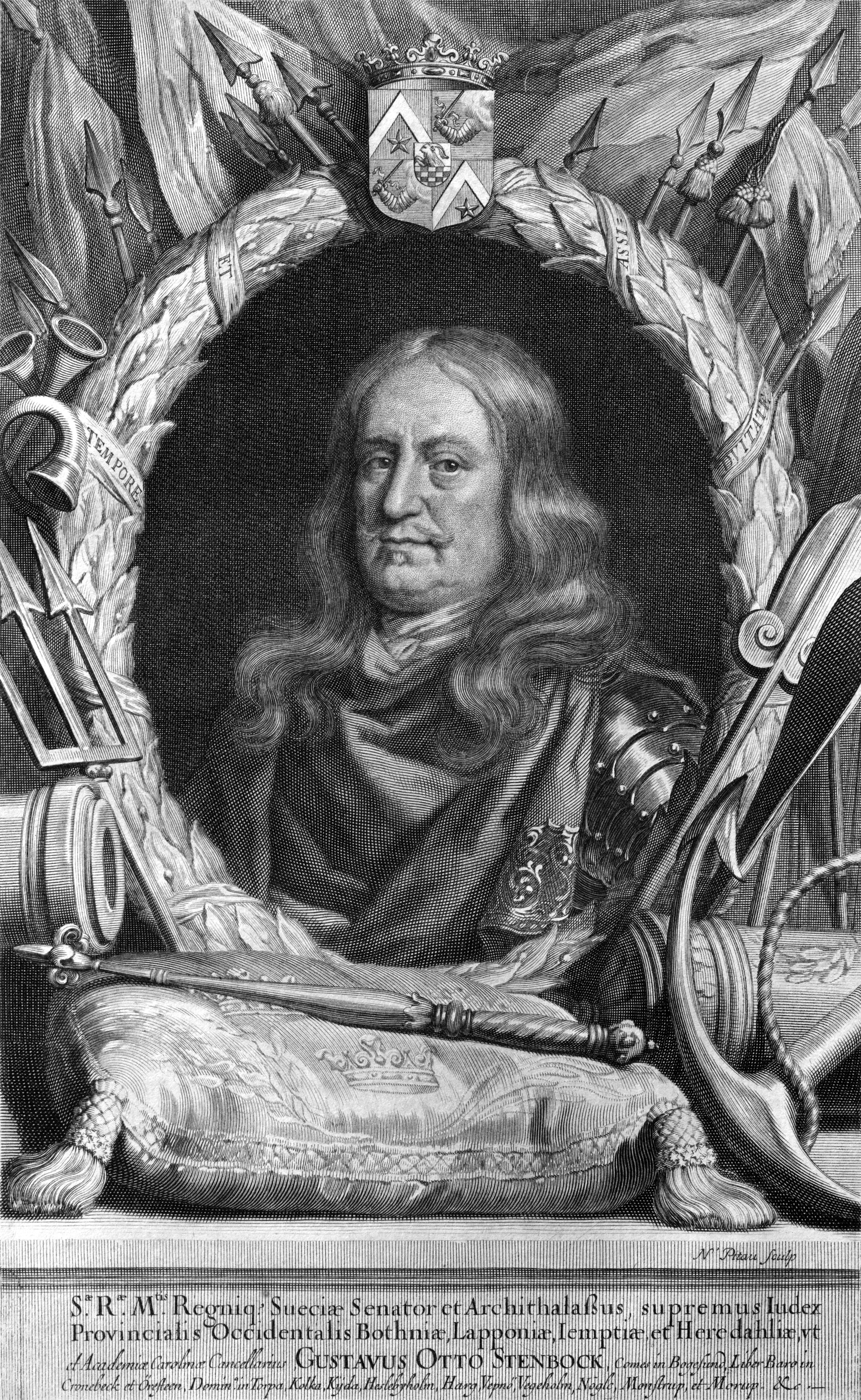
Gustaf Otto Stenbock

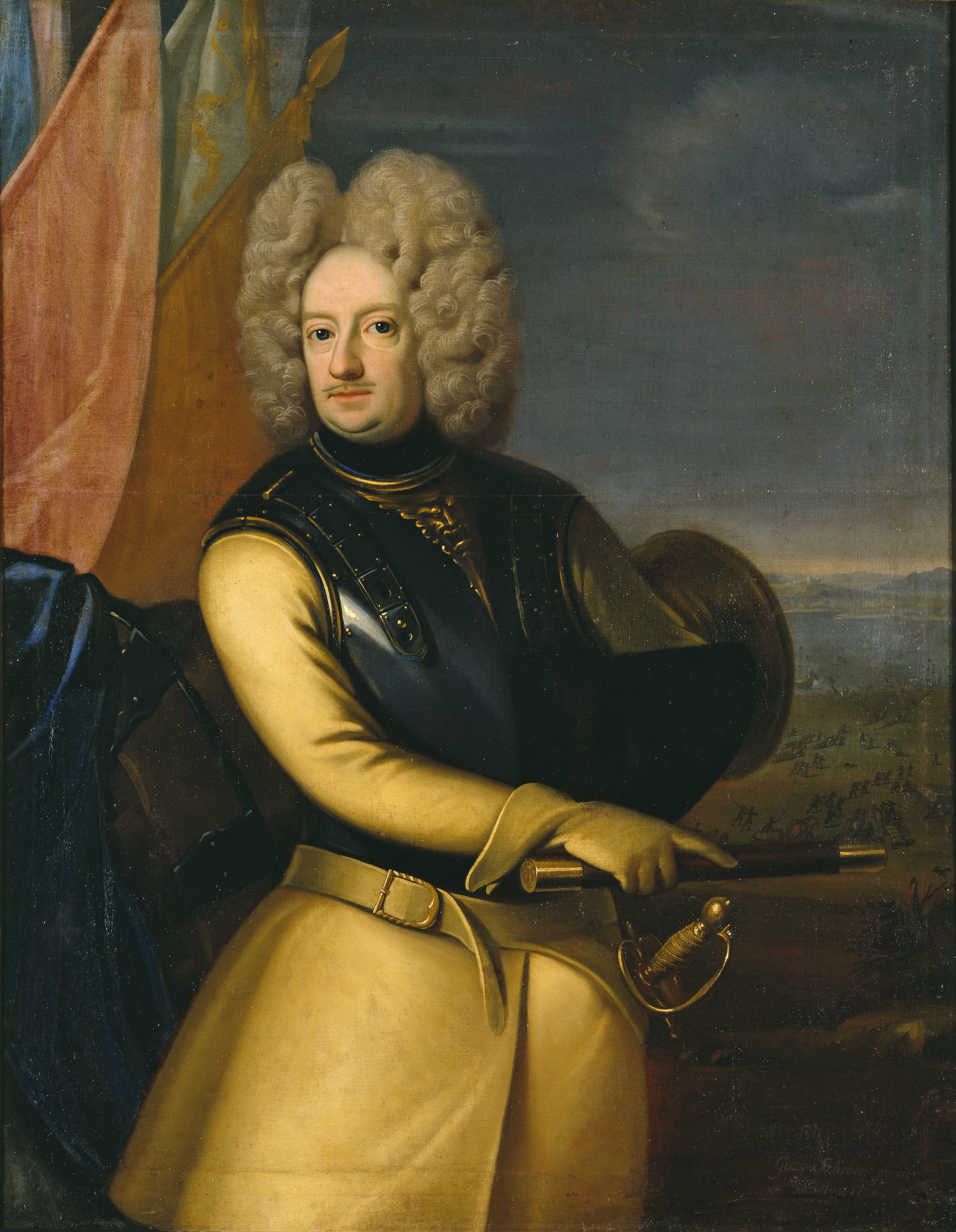
Magnus Stenbock

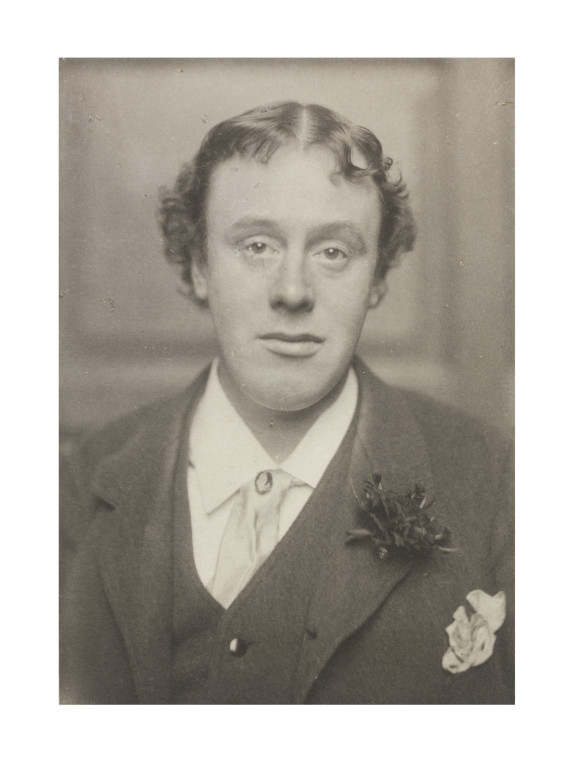
Eric Stenbock

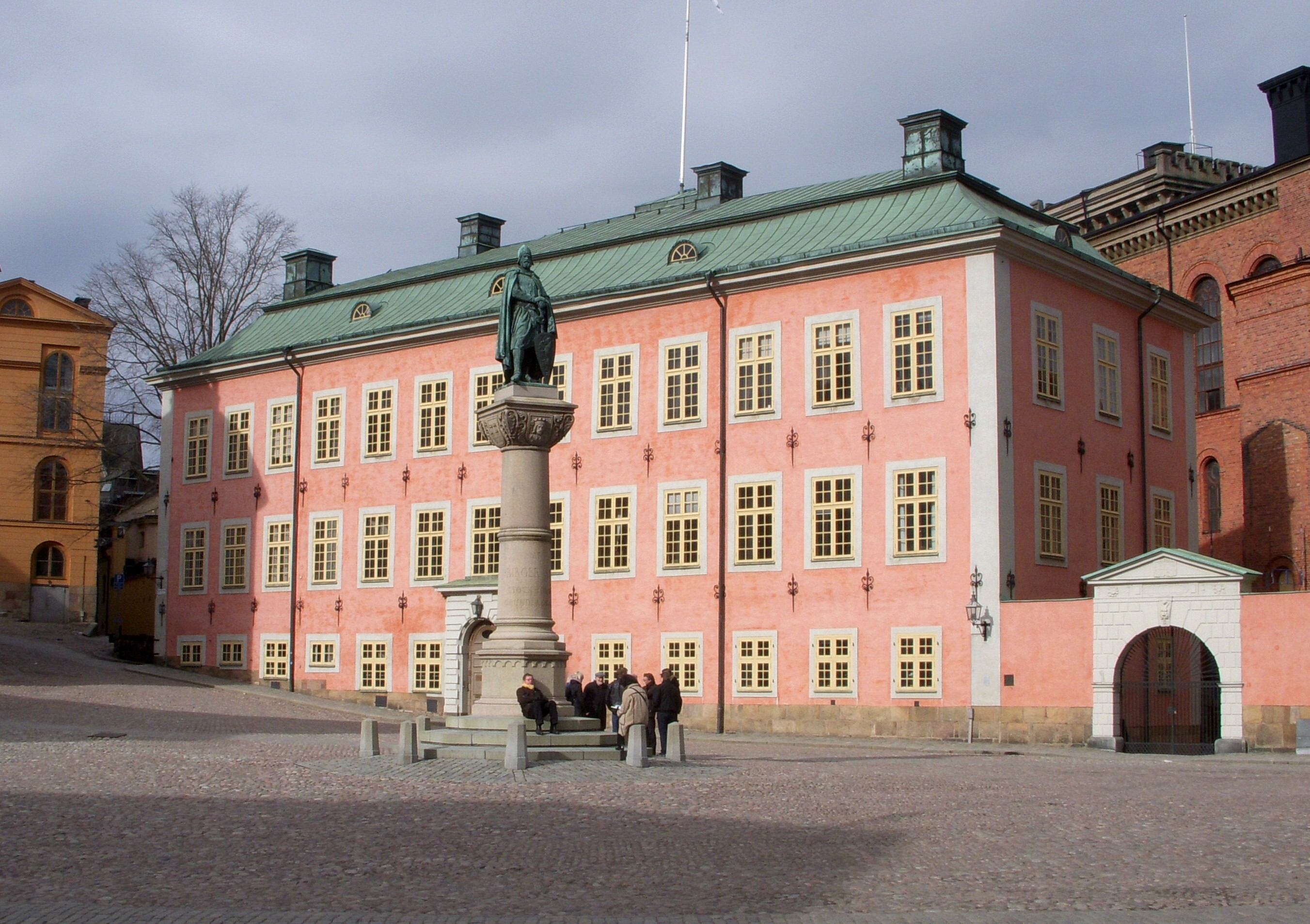
Stenbock Palace, Stockholm, built around 1640

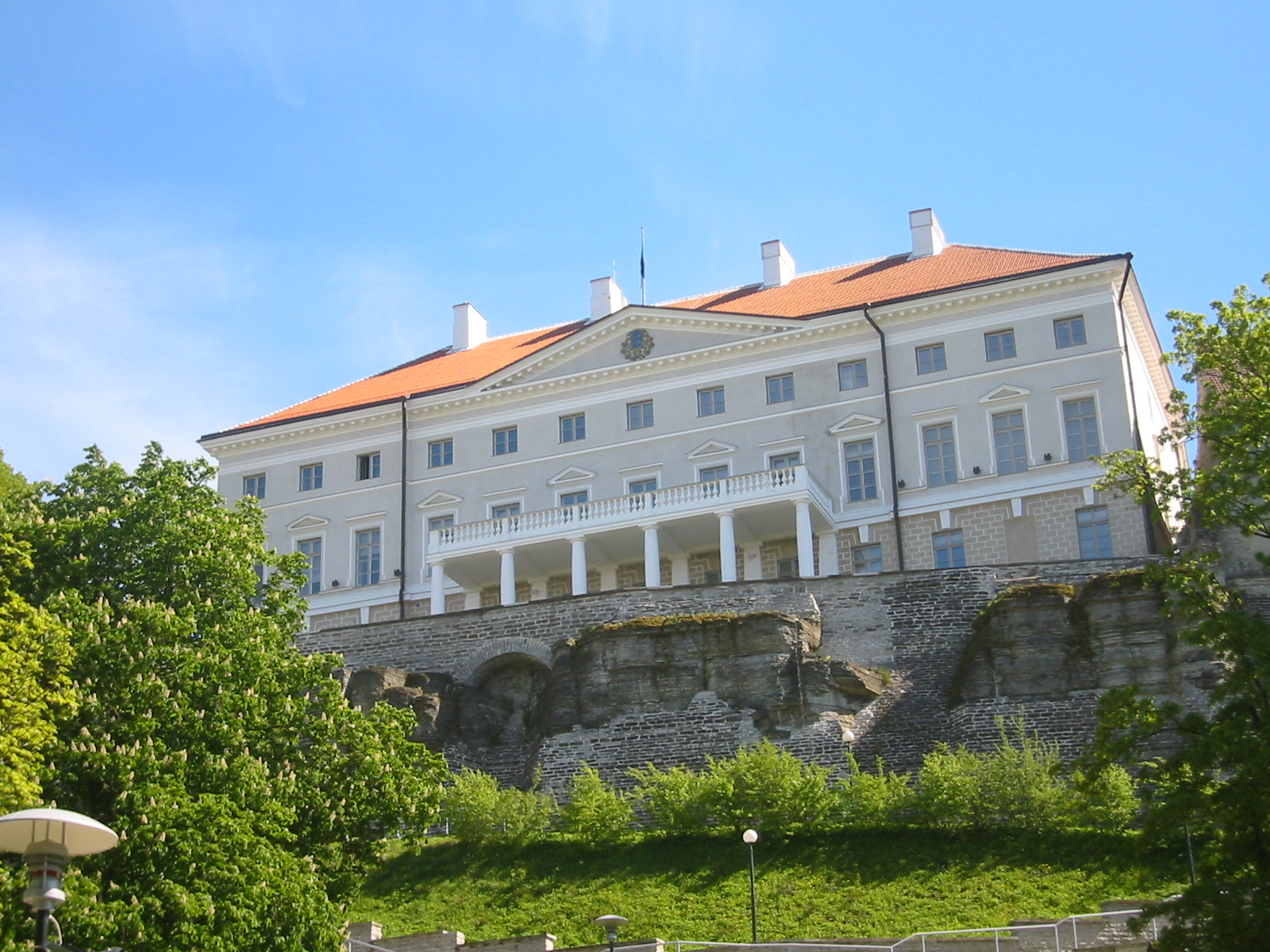
Stenbock House, Tallinn, built around 1790, now the seat of the Estonian Government

== See also ==
- Stenbock House, seat of the government of Estonia in Tallinn
