= Nils Svantesson Sture =

Swedish diplomat (1543–1567)

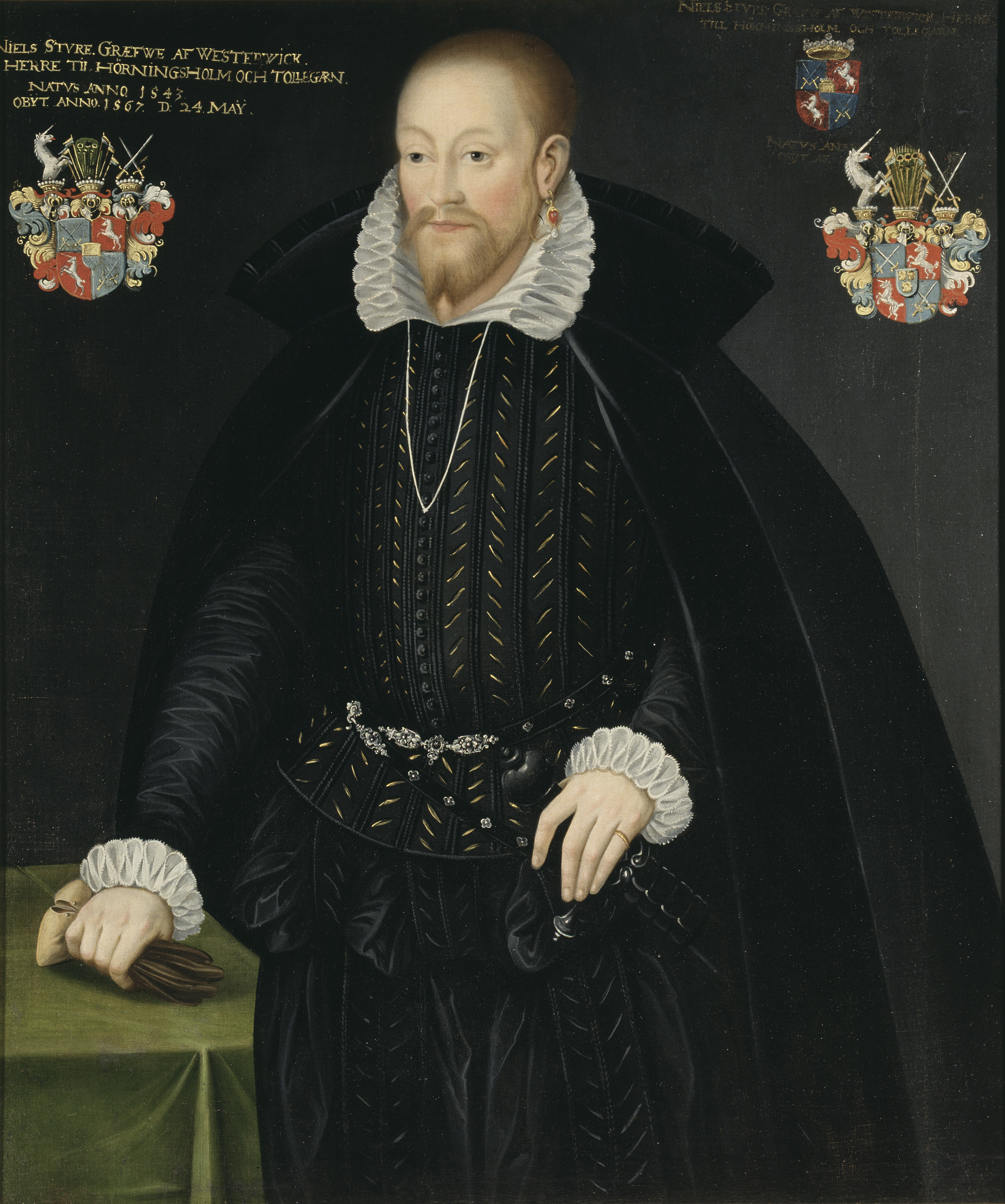
Nils Svantesson Sture, early 17th century portrait

Nils Svantesson Sture (b. 20 July 1543 at Hörningsholm Castle, d. 24 May 1567 in the Sture Murders at Uppsala Castle) was a Swedish diplomat and soldier during the reign of Erik XIV. He was the son of Svante Stensson Sture and Märta ("King Martha") Erikdotter Leijonhufvud.

His diplomatic missions included negotiations at the court of Elizabeth I of England in 1561, with John of Finland in 1562, and at the court of Lorraine in 1566/67. As a soldier, he participated in the Nordic Seven Years War's battles of Varberg and Axtorna, where he was wounded, and in the Siege of Bohus.

Sture fell into disgrace twice, due to Erik XIV's general distrust of the aristocracy and his astrology-based fear that Sture might usurp his throne. On 15 June 1566, after a death sentence Sture had received was commuted, he was publicly humiliated in Stockholm, where he was forced to ride a wretched hack through town with a straw crown on his head. On 21 May 1567, returning from his final mission in Lorraine, he was arrested again in Uppsala Castle. In what became known as the Sture Murders (Sturemorden), he was murdered in his cell three days later by Erik XIV in person.
