= Svartsjö Palace =

Rococo palace situated in Svartsjö

Coordinates: 59°21′46″N 17°43′40″E

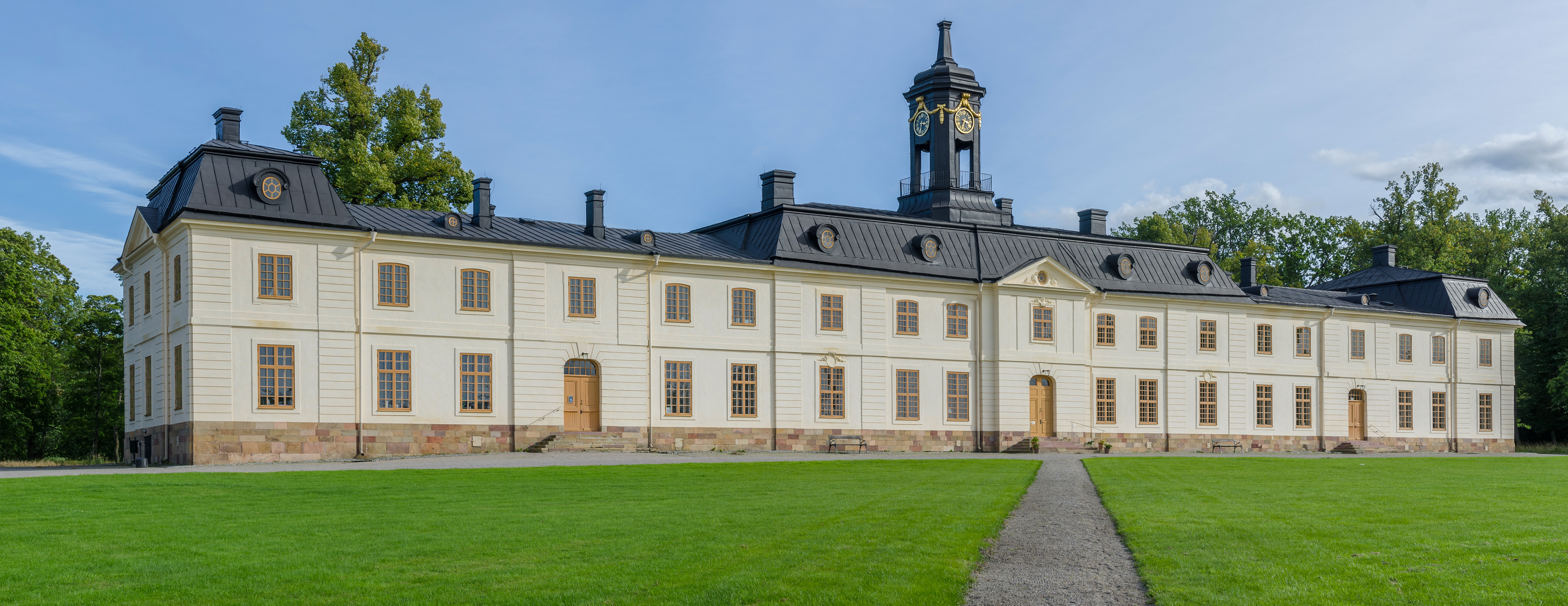
Svartsjö palace in September 2012.

Svartsjö Palace (Swedish: Svartsjö slott, "Black Lake Castle") is a Rococo palace situated in Svartsjö on the island of Färingsö in lake Mälaren. It lies just outside of Stockholm.

== History ==
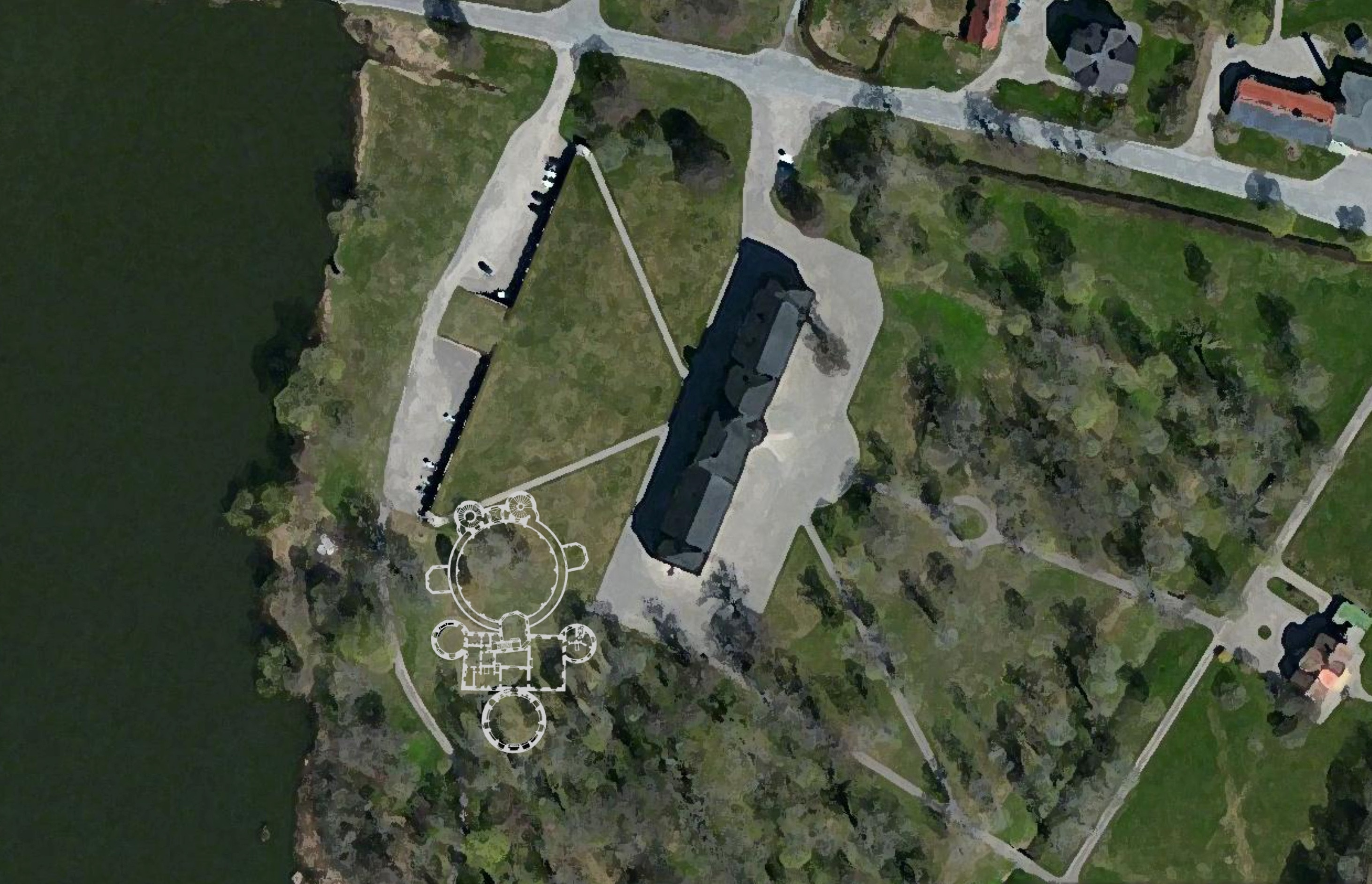
Approximate location of earlier castle as it relates to the new palace and existing ruins.

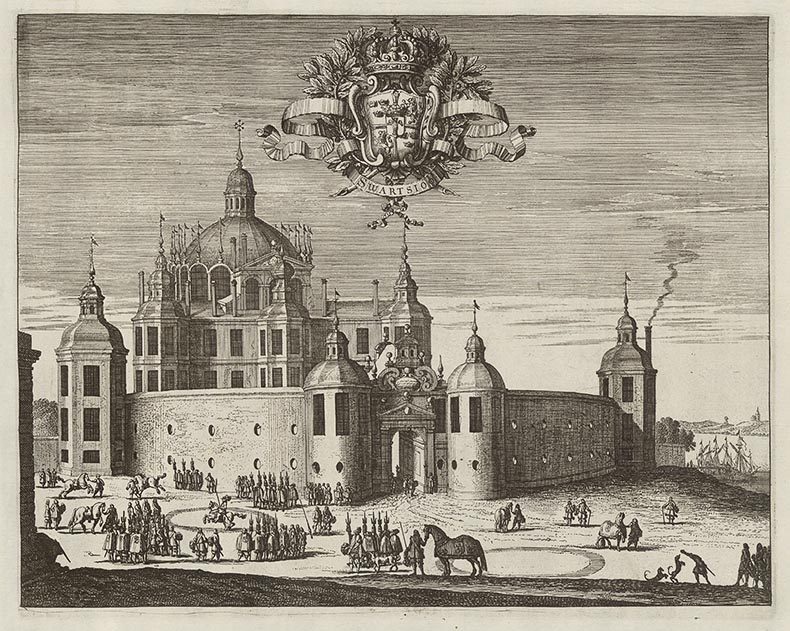
During the Renaissance era, Svartsjö Palace had a round court surrounded by arcades in two stories. The main building was a large cube crowned by a cupola and small towers. Engraving from Suecia Antiqua et Hodierna.

=== Royal residence ===
The location of this palace has housed several royal buildings. During medieval times there was a stone house where prominent Swedish royalty lived. Gustav Vasa and his sons Erik and Johan erected a lavish renaissance palace with a round inner courtyard. It was at least partly designed by Willem Boy and completed in 1580 but burnt down in 1687. The remaining building material was shipped to Stockholm to be used in the build of the castle Tre kronor. The stone foundation was left and is visible today.

The current buildings middle section was started in 1734 and finished in 1739 on the order of Fredrik I. It was built as a hunting palace for then current queen Ulrika Eleonora using drawings by Carl Hårleman. The now Rococo palace, raised by inspiration of French palaces, became a model for Swedish country mansion architecture during the later part of the 18th century.

The palace was extended on both short ends by drawings of Carl Fredrik Adelcrantz, together with a bell tower. It was given to the Queen dowager Louisa Ulrika of Prussia as a residence for her widowhood in 1771. The palace was abandoned for over a hundred years after the death of Lovisa Ulrika in 1782.

=== The prison period ===
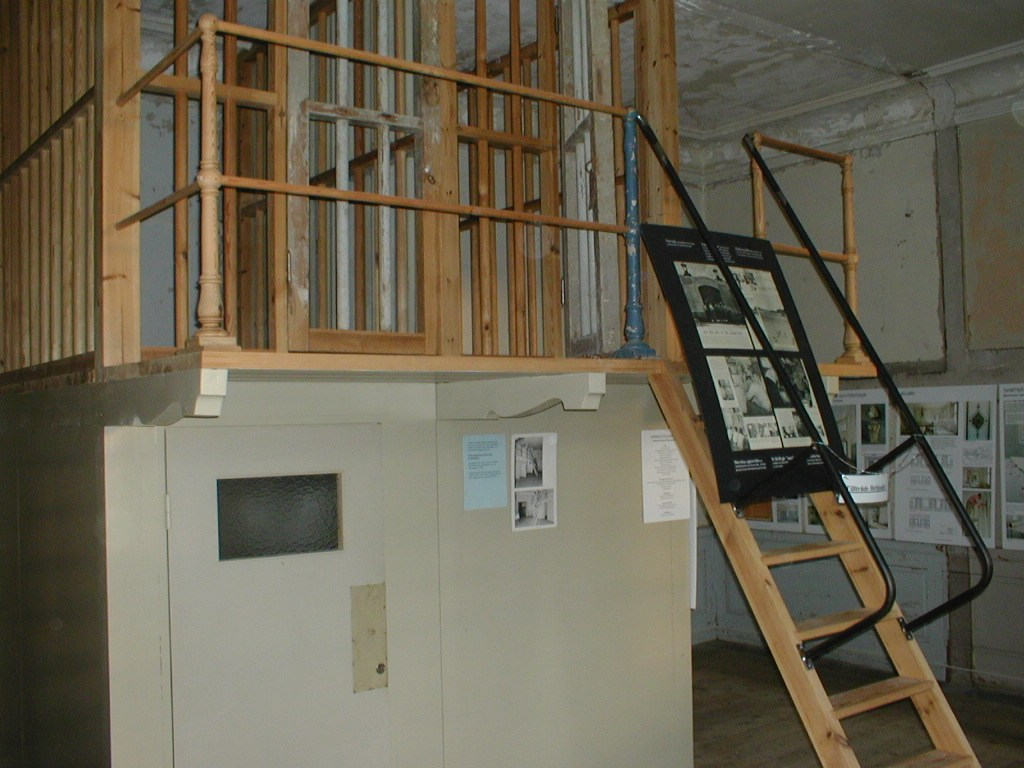
Reconstructed prison cells

Due to the large areas of minable granite in the area the palace was transformed in 1891 into a prison. Prisoners mined the granite until 1910, when a successful trial with farming and logging proved to work better for the prison. As more violent criminals were admitted to Svartsjö Palace, a special closed section was created with 337 cells built with steel walls.

In 1966 the palace ceased to be used as a prison, and the prison walls were torn down. The prison warden house still remains in the palace gardens, as well as several prison personnel houses in the nearby area.

== Modern restoration ==
After years of neglect the palace was restored from 1994 to 2003 by the state, to a cost of 36 million SEK. The façade has regained its light shade, made to resemble French sandstone. The windows are painted in a gold brown oak color. None of the original wallpaper was kept but wallpaper based on nearby Drottningholm Palace was used.
