= Maria Sofia De la Gardie =

Swedish countess, courtier, banker and entrepreneur

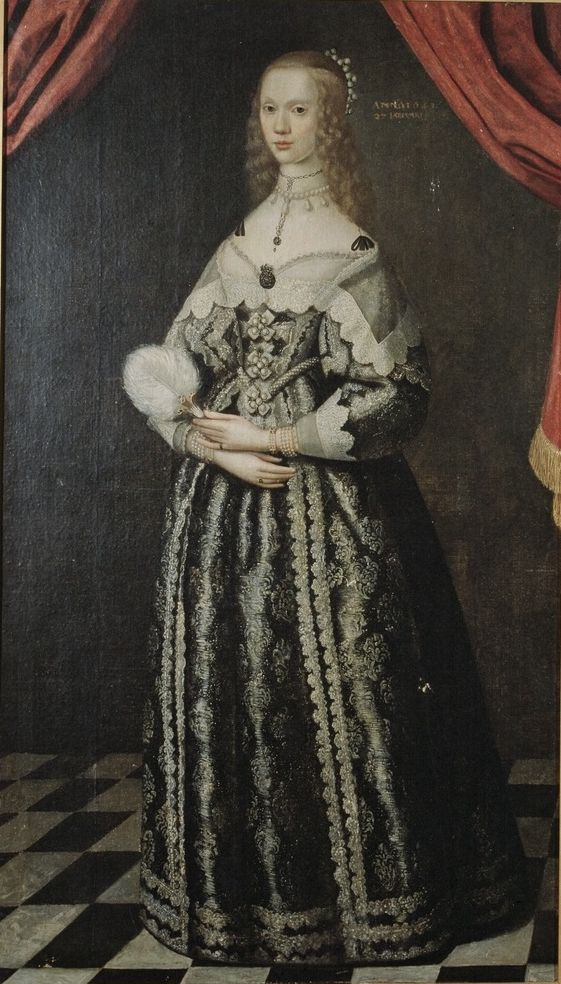
- Born: 1627
- Died: 22 August 1694 (aged 66–67)
- Spouse(s): Gustaf Gabrielsson Oxenstierna (m. 1643–48; his death)
- Children: 3
- Parent(s): Jacob De la Gardie; Ebba Brahe

Maria Sofia De la Gardie (1627 – 22 August 1694) was a Swedish countess, courtier, banker and entrepreneur. She is most known for her industrial enterprises, and she has been referred to as the first female grand entrepreneur of her country. She served as överhovmästarinna to Queen Christina of Sweden.

== Biography ==
=== Early life ===
Maria Sofia De la Gardie was born to count Jacob De la Gardie and Ebba Brahe. She was the sister of Magnus Gabriel De la Gardie, the favorite of Queen Christina, Queen of Sweden and the sister-in-law of Princess Countess Palatine Maria Eufrosyne of Zweibrücken, the cousin of the queen. She was born and raised in Swedish Estonia, where her father was governor of Reval. In 1643, she married baron Gustaf Gabrielsson Oxenstierna (1613–1648), a nephew of the regent Axel Oxenstierna (1583–1654), who succeeded her father as governor of Swedish Estonia. As was the custom for many 17th-century Swedish noblewomen, she kept her own surname after marriage. Both her own family and the family of her spouse were extremely wealthy. During his absence, she managed his estates.

They soon had a daughter, who died in infancy, followed by another two daughters, Juliana Gustava Oxenstierna (1644 – 1675) and Märta Elisabeth Oxenstierna (1648 – 1698). Märta was born the same year that Gustav Oxenstierna died.

=== Life at court ===
After the death of her spouse in 1648, Maria Sofia became the guardian of her two underage daughters and was responsible of the vast estates of the family at the age of just 20 or 21 years. After the death of her father in 1652, she was also given the responsibility of managing several of his estates, making her one of the greatest landowners in Sweden.

Maria Sofia was described as a great beauty who was temperamental, forceful, talented, and could speak both French and German fluently. She was close to her brother Magnus Gabriel, the favorite of the monarch, and it was possibly because of him that she was showered with gifts from the monarch. She was given an allowance which helped her sort out her affairs, and her late spouse was posthumously granted the title of count, giving her the title and rank of precedence of countess at court. In 1651, she was appointed head lady-in-waiting, first with the title Court Mistress (Hovmastarinna) but soon with the title Chief Court Mistress (Overhovmastarinna), the highest office for a woman at the royal court, though it was split on several people during the reign of Christina. She often hosted the queen at her residence Tyresö Palace, where the monarch liked to hunt.

In 1649, there was reports of a possible marriage with the heir to the throne, future King Charles X of Sweden. The Danish ambassador reported about them in November that year. The plans was never realized, but the rumors continued until 1652. They were possibly staged by Queen Christina of Sweden as a way of avoiding the pressure of Christina to marry Charles. In reality, they are not considered to have been serious if they did occur. It is however known that she was proposed to by the Duke of Croy. Maria Sofia had many suitors but preferred to stay unmarried.

It is known that she passionately supported her brother when he fell from grace in 1653, but this does not seem to have affected either his or her own positions. With some exceptions, such as Ebba Sparre, lady Jane Ruthven and Louise van der Nooth, Christina did not show any interest in her female courtiers, and generally mentions them only to express contempt over their femininity and portray herself as more masculine than them. After the abdication of Christina in 1654, Maria Sofia left court to devote her life to her industrial interests, for which she has become known in history.

=== Industrial activity ===
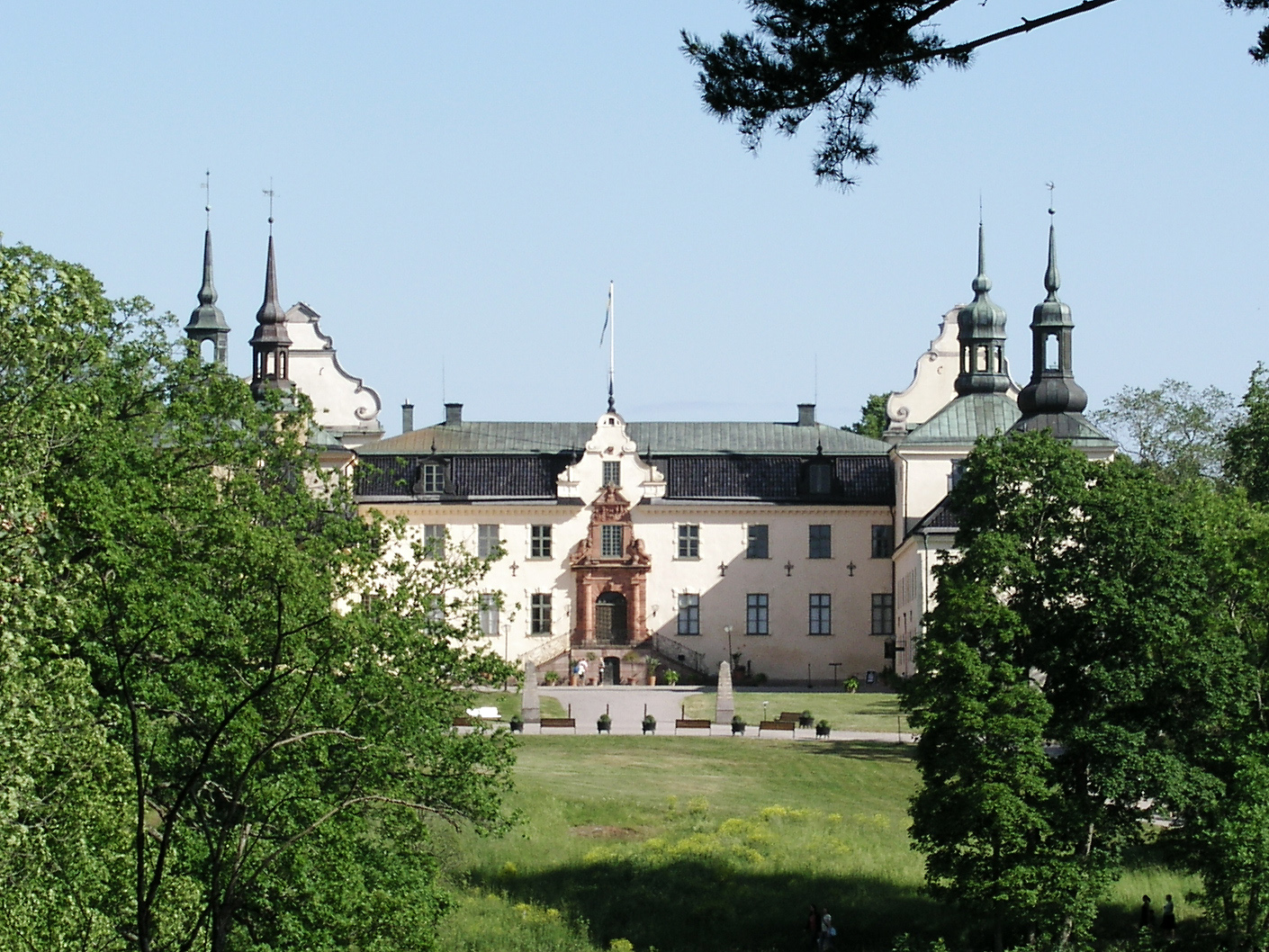
Tyresö Castle

Maria Sofia De la Gardie resided in Tyresö Palace, from where she managed her estates around the Baltic Sea. On her brothers' suggestion, she made a study trip to the Netherlands, to study the industrial life. She was interested in cattlebreeding and gardening. She managed glovemaking and a brassmakery. Her most successful enterprise was a textile industry: by the energy of waterfalls on her estate, she manufactured broadcloth and textiles, which were used to equip the army.

During the 1650s, Maria Sofia engaged in banking activity and competed with her competitor, Stockholms Banco, by taking up large loans in the bank and then using the sums by lending it to the customers in her own bank: this was initially very lucrative, but eventually, problems enabled the Stockholms Banco to confiscate and sell her banking security.

Maria Sofia took part in the pacification of Skåne by acquiring several estates there after it had been incorporated into Sweden in 1658. In 1667, she bought Krapperup Castle and managed a colliery for export. She built ships, exported timber and grain, founded papermills and fabricated linseed oil.

During the famous Katarina witch trials in 1676, the main witness Lisbeth Carlsdotter, inspired by the Gävle-Boy, tried to implicate Maria Sofia and her sister-in-law Maria Eufrosyne for witchcraft. This accusation was not taken seriously and was never brought to trial; rather, it damaged the credibility of the witness to such a point that it eventually led to the end of the whole witch hunt.

At the Great Reduction of King Charles XI of Sweden in the 1680s, most of Maria Sofia and her brothers' property was confiscated by the crown, something which affected her deeply. She died in 1694.

== See also ==
- Margaretha Donner
- Margareta von Ascheberg

== Other sources ==
- Marie Sophie De la Gardie, urn:sbl:17384, Svenskt biografiskt lexikon (art av B, BoiiTHius.), hämtad 2013-11-28.
- Ellen Fries: Svenska Kvinnor ['Swedish women'], utg av S.Björklund, (1920) (in Swedish)
- Jan Guillou: Häxornas försvarare ['Defender of the witches'] (in Swedish)
- Wilhelmina Stålberg: Anteckningar om svenska qvinnor ('Notes on Swedish women'] (in Swedish)

Court offices
| Preceded by Kerstin Bååt (With Margareta Brahe) | Overhovmastarinna to the Queen of Sweden; 1651–1654 (With Barbro Fleming) | Succeeded by Elisabet Carlsdotter Gyllenhielm |
