= Christina Natt och Dag =

Swedish court official

Christina Nilsdotter Natt och Dag (1580-1642) was a Swedish court official and member of the Natt och Dag family. She was the royal governess of queen Christina of Sweden from 1639 until 1642.

== Biography ==
Christina Natt och Dag was the only daughter of four children to nobleman Nils Nilsson Natt och Dag (1554-1613), chamberlain at the royal court, and Anna Bengtsdotter Gylta (1550-1603). She married royal governor nobleman Holger von Scheiding (1583-1631). Her eldest brother Pehr Nilsson Natt och Dag (1583-1634) was a member of the Council and her middle brother Ivar Nilsson Natt och Dag (1590-1651) was a royal governor.

=== Court life ===
After the death of the queen's foster mother and aunt Catherine of Sweden, Countess Palatine of Kleeburg, the Royal Regency Council under Axel Oxenstierna saw a need to appoint a new foster mother to the underage monarch (her mother being exiled), which resulted in a reorganization of the queen's household. In order to avoid the young queen from being dependent upon a single individual and favorite mother figure, the Royal Council decided to split the office of head lady-in-waiting (responsible for the queen's female courtiers) and the office royal governess (or foster mother) in four, with two women appointed to share each office. Accordingly, in 1639 Ebba Leijonhufvud and Christina Natt och Dag was appointed to share the position of royal governess and foster mother with the title Upptuktelse-Förestånderska ('Castigation Mistress'), while Beata Oxenstierna and Ebba Ryning was appointed to share the position of head lady-in-waiting, all four with the formal rank and title of Hovmästarinna. This signified a permanent reorganization of the Swedish Royal Household: previously, there had been only one Mistress of the Robes with the title Hovmästarinna ('Court Mistress'), but now, Beata Oxenstierna was additionally given the newly invented title of Överhovmästarinna ('Chief Court Mistress'), and from the reign of Christina onward, there were to be one or two Hovmästarinna and one Överhovmästarinna at the Swedish Royal Court.

The choice of Ebba Leijonhufvud and Christina Natt och Dag to the office of foster mother was officially motivated by their mutually reputed qualities of "honesty and virtue, seriousness and steadfastness", and in the case of Leijonhufvud in particular, her ideally educated daughter Anna Margareta was noted as an example of the great ability of her mother in raising a child. In reality, however, Ebba Leijonhufvud was the mother-in-law to the son of the Regent of the Guardian Government, Axel Oxenstierna, by that very same daughter, and Beata Oxenstierna and Ebba Ryning was also connected to the Oxenstierna Party, which is believed to have played a part in their appointments. Christina Natt och Dag, for her part, had good connections belonging to a family of court officials, her paternal grandmother Karin Gyllenstierna having been the chief lady-in-waiting to queen Catherine Jagiellon and princess Anna Vasa of Sweden, and her father having had a number of court offices, as well as her eldest brother being a member of the Council and her stepmother having been princess Sigrid of Sweden (1566–1633).

The Royal Council's method of giving queen Christina several foster mothers to avoid her forming an attachment to a single person seems to have been effective: Christina dies not mention her foster mothers directly in her memoirs and does not seem to have formed any attachment to either of them, nor do they seem to have played any part at court after their term in service ended. With some exceptions, such as Ebba Sparre, lady Jane Ruthven and Louise van der Nooth, Christina did not show any interest in any her female courtiers whatsoever, and she generally mentions them in her memoirs only to compare herself favorably toward them by referring to herself as more masculine than them. In 1639 she mentions her attitude toward her ladies in waiting in regard to Beata Oxenstierna and her daughter, maid of honor Märta Ulfsparre:

"The Mistress of the Robes Lady Beata Oxenstierna and her daughter arrived just now. The more of them that comes here the worse it is" [...] "I despised everyone in my surroundings, particularly the women of my household, from whom I could not stand the smallest reproach."
