= Ebba Leijonhufvud =

Swedish noble and courtier

Ebba Mauritzdotter Leijonhufvud, also called Ebba Mauritzdotter Lewenhaupt (1595 – 25 January 1654), Countess of Raseborg, Lady of Käggleholm, Eksjöhovgård and Tullgarn, was a Swedish nobleman, courtier and member of the Leijonhufvud family. She served as överhovmästarinna in 1633–1634 and foster mother in 1639–1644 to Christina, Queen of Sweden. She was also known for her donations to various churches.

== Early life ==
Ebba Mauritzdotter was born to count Mauritz Stensson Leijonhufvud and Amalia von Hatzfeld: her paternal grandmother was her controversial namesake Ebba Lilliehöök, after which her father and herself inherited the County of Raseborg.

She married riksråd and chancellor count Svante Sture (d. 1616) in 1613, and riksråd and general governor Claes Horn of Kanckas (d. 1632) in 1618. As was the custom in the Swedish nobility until the late 18th-century, however, she kept her own name Leijonhufvud after marriage. In 1636, she became closely affiliated with Axel Oxenstierna, leader of the Regency Government of Queen Christina, through the marriage of her daughter (and only child) Anna Margareta Sture (1614-1646) to Johan Oxenstierna.

In 1631, she accompanied the queen, Maria Eleonora of Brandenburg, to Germany, where she joined her second spouse Horn who served in the Thirty Years' War. Widowed the following year, she returned to Sweden with the niece of her late spouse, Agneta Horn, to whom she acted as guardian. In the famous memoirs of Agneta Horn, she was described as a "cold and heartless" foster parent.

== Court life ==
In 1633, Ebba Leijonhufvud was appointed Mistress of the Robes to the underage monarch, queen Christina, with responsibility for the ladies-in-waiting of the queen. She kept this office for one year and was succeeded by Elisabeth Gyllenstierna.

After the death of the queen's foster mother and aunt Catherine of Sweden, Countess Palatine of Kleeburg, the Royal Regency Council under Axel Oxenstierna saw a need to appoint a new foster mother to the underage monarch (her mother being exiled), which resulted in a reorganization of the queen's household. In order to avoid the young queen from being dependent upon a single individual and favorite mother figure, the Royal Council decided to split the office of head lady-in-waiting (responsible for the queen's female courtiers) and the office royal governess (or foster mother) in four, with two women appointed to share each office. Accordingly, in 1639 Ebba Leijonhufvud and Christina Natt och Dag was appointed to share the position of royal governess and foster mother with the title Upptuktelse-Förestånderska ('Castigation Mistress'), while Beata Oxenstierna and Ebba Ryning was appointed to share the position of head lady-in-waiting, all four with the formal rank and title of Hovmastarinna. This signified a permanent reorganization of the Swedish Royal Household: previously, there had been only one Mistress of the Robes with the title Hovmästarinna ('Court Mistress'), but now, Beata Oxenstierna was additionally given the newly invented title of Överhovmästarinna ('Chief Court Mistress'), and from the reign of Christina onward, there were to be one or two Hovmästarinna and one Överhovmästarinna at the Swedish Royal Court.

The choice of Ebba Leijonhufvud and Christina Natt och Dag to the office of foster mother was officially motivated by their mutually reputed qualities of "honesty and virtue, seriousness and steadfastness", and in the case of Leijonhufvud in particular, her ideally educated daughter Anna Margareta was noted as an example of the great ability of her mother in raising a child. In reality, however, Ebba Leijonhufvud was the mother-in-law to the son of the Regent of the Guardian Government, Axel Oxenstierna, by that very same daughter, and Beata Oxenstierna and Ebba Ryning was also connected to the Oxenstierna Party, which is believed to have played a part in their appointments. Christina Natt och Dag for her part had good connections at court, her paternal grandmother Karin Gyllenstierna having been the chief lady-in-waiting to queen Catherine Jagiellon and princess Anna Vasa of Sweden.

The Royal Council's method of giving queen Christina several foster mothers to avoid her forming an attachment to a single person seems to have been effective: Christina did not mention her foster mothers directly in her memoirs and does not seem to have formed any attachment to either of them, nor do they seem to have played any part at court after their term in service ended. With some exceptions, such as Ebba Sparre, lady Jane Ruthven and Louise van der Nooth, Christina did not show any interest in any her female courtiers whatsoever, and she generally mentions them in her memoirs only to compare herself favorably toward them by referring to herself as more masculine than them. In 1639 she mentions her attitude toward her ladies in waiting in regard to Beata Oxenstierna and her daughter, maid of honor Märta Ulfsparre: "The Mistress of the Robes Lady Beata Oxenstierna and her daughter arrived just now. The more of them that comes here the worse it is" [...] "I despised everyone in my surroundings, particularly the women of my household, from whom I could not stand the smallest reproach."

In 1642, her colleague, Christina Natt och Dag, died, and Christina was declared to be of legal maturity in 1644. Because her only child died childless before her, Ebba Leijonhufvud appointed her former son-in-law Johan Oxenstierna as her heir.

Court offices
Preceded by Brita Gylta	Mistress of the Robes to the Queen of Sweden; 1633–1634	Succeeded by Elisabeth Gyllenstierna
Preceded by	Royal Governess (Sweden); 1639–1644 (With Christina Natt och Dag)	Succeeded by
