= Gyllenstierna =

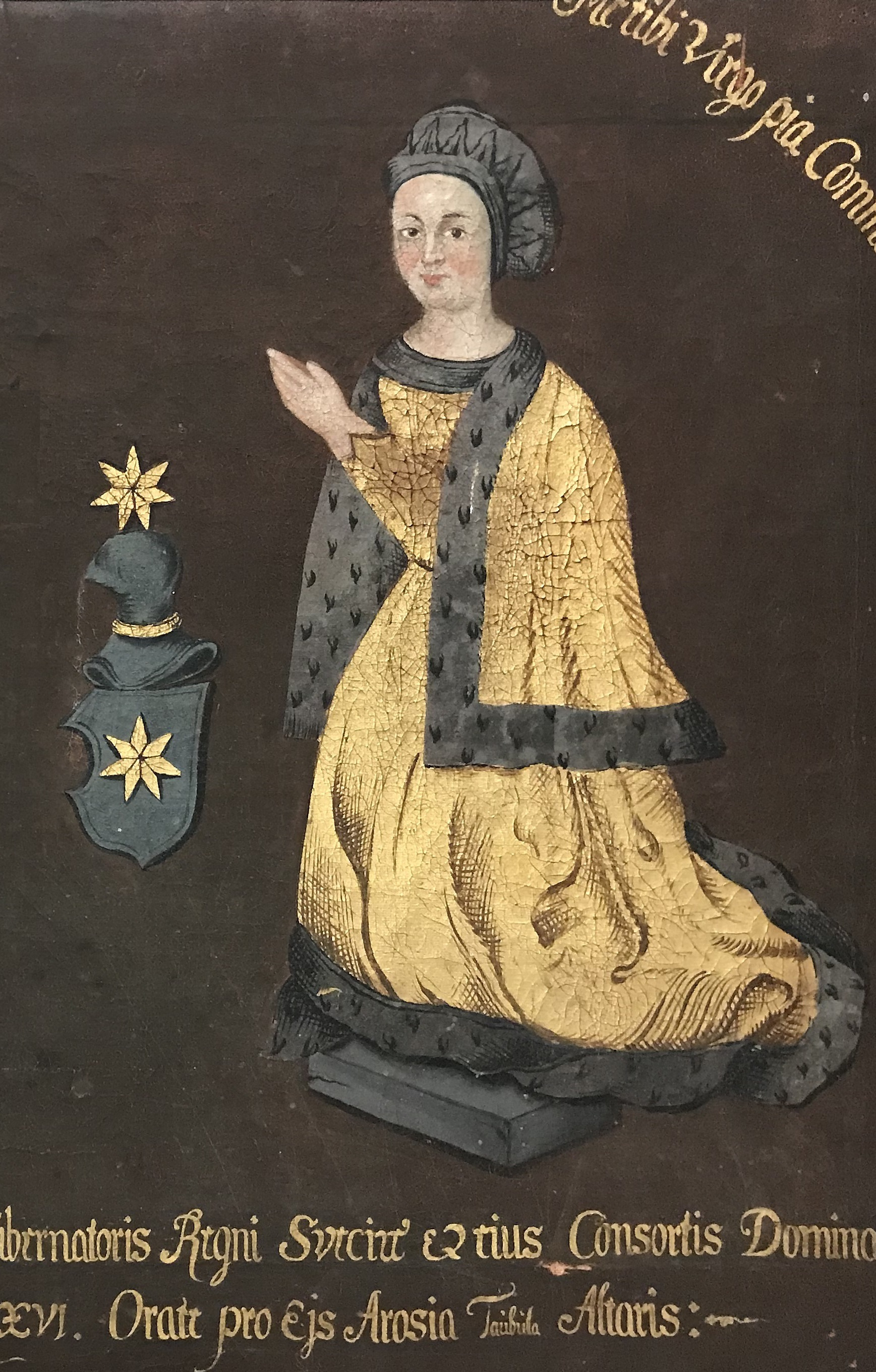
Christina Gyllenstierna

Gyllenstierna is a Danish and Swedish noble surname that may refer to:

- Carl Gyllenstierna (1649–1723), Swedish nobleman and statesman.
- Christina Gyllenstierna (1494/5–1559), wife of Sten Sture the Younger and Swedish resistance leader
- Christofer Gyllenstierna (1942–2025), Swedish diplomat
- Ebbe Gyllenstierna (1911–2003), Swedish Army officer and modern pentathlete
- Elisabeth Gyllenstierna (1581–1646) Swedish court official
- Eric Gyllenstierna (1882–1940), Swedish diplomat
- Görwel Gyllenstierna (1646–1708), Swedish noblewoman duellist
- Johan Göransson Gyllenstierna (1635–1680), Swedish statesman
- Karin Gyllenstierna, 17th century Swedish courtier
- Maria Gustava Gyllenstierna (1672–1737), Swedish countess, writer and translator
- Margareta Gyllenstierna (1689–1740), Swedish political activist
- Nils Gyllenstierna (1530–1601), Swedish statesman who was the Lord High Chancellor of Sweden from 1560 to 1590 and Lord High Steward of Sweden from 1590 to 1601

== See also ==
- Gyldenstierne (noble family)
