= 1646 in Sweden =

Events from 1646 in Sweden.

== Incumbents ==
- Monarch – Christina

== Events ==
- Carl Gustaf Wrangel appointed the new leader of the Swedish army.
- The Battle of Jankau (March 6): This battle took place between the forces of Sweden
- The Treaty of Brömsebro (August 13): This treaty concluded the Torstenson War
- Continued involvement in the Thirty Years' War
- Ceasefire was called between Sweden and Saxony in Eulenburg (March 31)
- Economic and Social Developments: The war exerted significant strain on Sweden's economy and society.
- Diplomatic Relations

== Births ==
- Ulrika Eleonora of Denmark (died July 26, 1693)
- Charles XI of Sweden (died April 5, 1697)
- Görwel Gyllenstierna, female duelist (died 1708)
- David Makeléer, governor (died November 10, 1708)
- Harald vallerius, composer and teacher (died 1716)

== Deaths ==
- Johannes Rudbeckius, personal chaplain to King Gustavus II Adolphus (born 1581)
- November 29 - Laurentius Paulinus Gothus, theologian, astronomer and Archbishop of Uppsala (born 1565)
- Peder Jönsson, hunter and judged lover of sjörået (born year unknown)
- Elisabeth Gyllenstierna, court official (born 1581)
