= Counties and baronies in Finland =

The creation and granting of counties and baronies in Finland began with the coronation of King Eric XIV in 1561 and continued through Great Reductions in the latter half of the 17th century.

Eric XIV created two baronies in 1561, the barony of Arvasalo to Lars Fleming, who was later entitled to use the name of his manor, Sundholmen, as his barony, and the barony of Joensuu to Klas Kristersson [Horn].

King John III is responsible for both the first granted barony, the barony of Viikki, to Klaus Eriksson Fleming in 1570 and the first granted county, the county of Raseborg, to baron Sten Eriksson of Grevsnes' widow and heirs in 1571.

King Sigismund recognized in 1594 Erik Bielke, the heir-general of late baron Lars Fleming, as baron without specifying a barony, and simultaneously his father (widower of baron Lars' heiress) and siblings. Much later, in Gustav II Adolf's reign, the same baron Erik was granted permission to use his own late father-in-law's (Klas Fleming's) barony of Wik as his and his wife's baronial title.

King Charles IX granted just one barony, the barony of Nynäs to Abraham Leijonhufvud, and Gustav II Adolf granted the county of Pärnu (in modern Estonia) to Frans Bernhard von Thurn, the barony of Kimito to Axel Oxenstierna and the barony of Tuutarhovi (in Ingria, now Tuutari) to Juhana Skytte.

== Creation of baronies under Queen Christina I ==
Queen Christina I of Sweden was a most profligate donator, having created more than half of the ever existed baronies, during 1647-54:

- county of Wasaborg to Gustaf Gustafsson, her illegitimate half-brother
- county of Kuressaare (Arensburg), in Saaremaa, today Estonia (later exchanged to Pärnu in continental coast of today Estonia) to Magnus Gabriel De la Gardie and his brothers
- county of Sortavala to Johan Adam Banér
- county of Pori to Gustaf Horn
- county of Korsholm and Wasa to Gabriel Oxenstierna
- county of Salmi and Suistamo pogosta to Carl Gustaf Wrangel
- county of Kronborg to Ture Oxenstierna
- barony of Loimijoki and county of Nyypori to Arvid Wittenberg
- county of Karleborg to Klas Tott
- barony of Korpo to count Nils Bielke
- barony of Kajaneborg to count Per Brahe
- barony of Örneholma to Wilhelm af Hästö
- barony of Liperi pogosta to Hermann Fleming
- barony of Oulu to Erik Gyllenstierna
- barony of Kitee pogosta to count Axel Lillie
- barony of Limingo to Matias Soop
- barony of Marienburg (in Livonia) to Gustaf Horn and certain his relatives
- barony of Vöråborg to Göran Paijkull
- barony of Tohmajärvi pogosta to Lars Kagg
- barony of Kokkola to Gustaf Banér
- barony of Laihia to Carl Bonde
- barony of Pyhäjoki to Klas Bielkenstierna
- barony of Iijoki to Åke Axelsson Tott
- barony of Ikalapori to Schering Rosenhane
- barony of Hailuoto to Berndt Taube
- Hans Wachtmeister Baron of Koivisto
- Johan Kurck baron of Lempäälä
- Jakob and Anders Lilliehöök barons of Närpes
- Kasper and Carl Henric Wrede barons of Elimä
- Erik Fleming baron of Lais, near Tartu in what is now Estonia

After Christina's reign, fiefs were soon to be confiscated, but yet Charles X Gustav created P. Wuertz baron of Örneholma that had fallen extinct.
