= 1581 in Sweden =

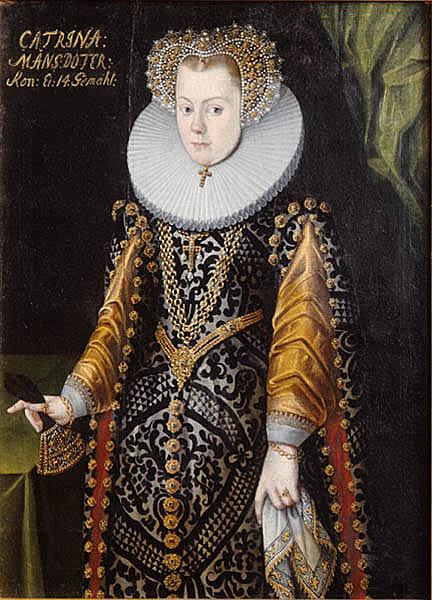
This image was long considered to be of her sister-in-law Queen Catherine but is now assumed to be of Elizabeth, with the text on the painting added later. It was probably painted in about 1580 when Elizabeth was engaged.

Events from the year 1581 in Sweden

== Incumbents ==
- Monarch – John III

== Events ==
The year 1581 was marked by several important events that shaped the course of Swedish history:

- Pontus De la Gardie, a prominent military figure, led the Swedish conquest of Narva, a key strategic location due to its accessibility to the Narva River, which would later play a significant role in the military and commercial affairs of the region.
- 7 May - The wedding of Princess Elizabeth of Sweden and Christopher, Duke of Mecklenburg took place. This union was a significant event in the year, fortifying the alliance between Sweden and Mecklenburg. The marriage was celebrated with grandeur, reflecting the political significance of the event.
- The notable work, Oeconomia eller Hushållsbok för ungt adelsfolk by Per Brahe was published, which served as a guide for young nobles in the conduct of their households and estates. This book played an instrumental role in setting the standards for the aristocratic lifestyle in Sweden during that period.

== Births ==
Several influential figures in Swedish history were born in 1581:

- Johannes Rudbeckius, bishop of Västerås and chaplain of the king, was born this year. He would later contribute significantly to the religious, educational and social life in Sweden. His most significant achievements included the establishment of the first gymnasium (school) in Västerås, and the introduction of confirmation in the Swedish Church. (died 1646)
- Elisabeth Gyllenstierna, a notable Swedish court official, was also born in this year. She would later serve as the head lady-in-waiting to Queen Maria Eleonora of Sweden and play a significant role in the royal court. (died 1646)

== Deaths ==
In 1581, Sweden mourned the death of:

- Gustav Vasa's third wife, Queen Catherine Stenbock. She was remembered for her efforts in managing the kingdom during Gustav's illnesses, and her patronage of arts and education.
