= Margareta Brahe =

Swedish noble (1603–1669)

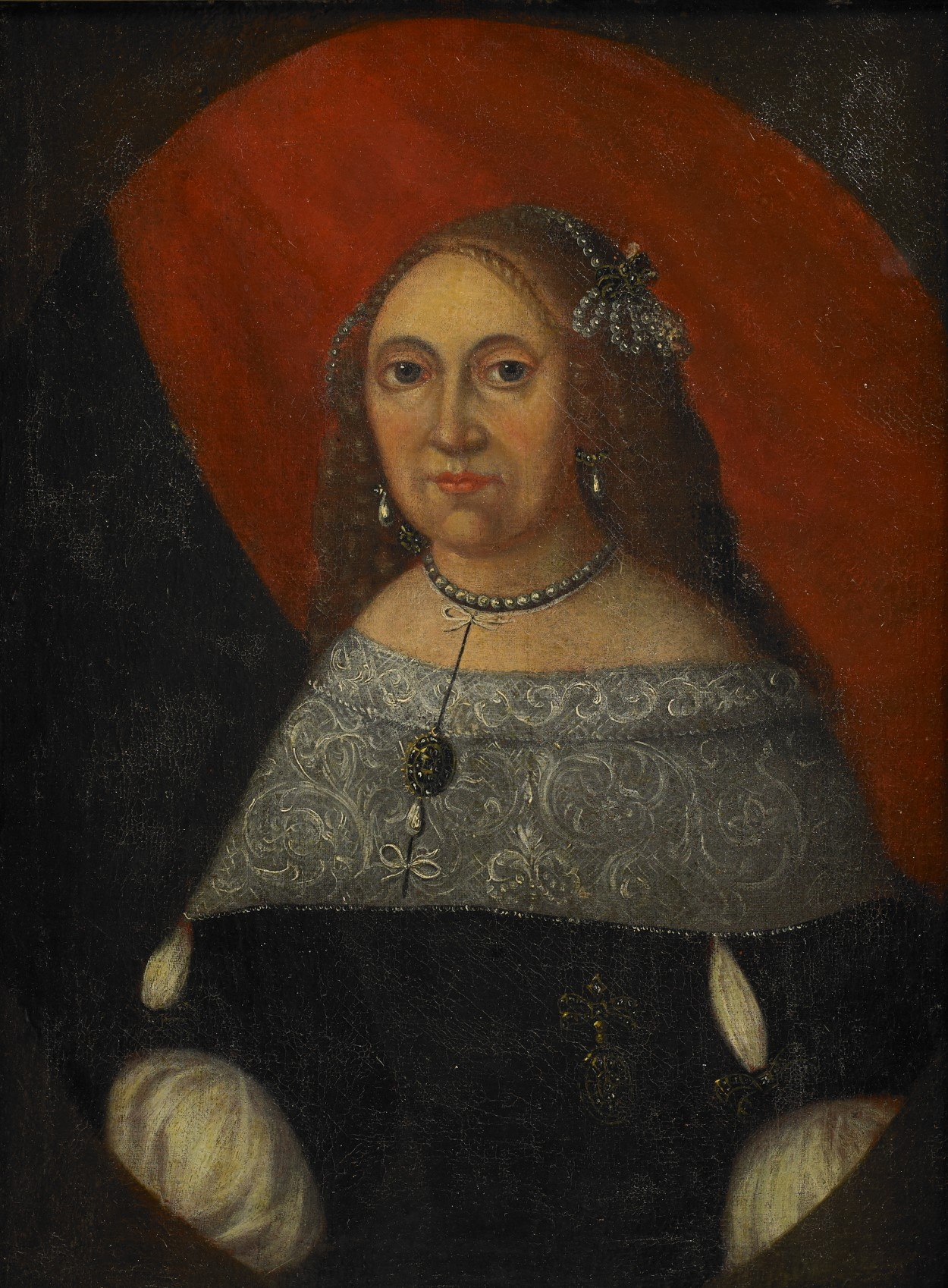
Margareta Brahe, Landgravine of Hesse-Homburg.

Margareta Abrahamsdotter Brahe (28 June 1603, Rydboholm – 15 May 1669, Weferlingen) was a Swedish aristocrat and court official, Landgravine of Hesse-Homburg by marriage to Frederick II, Landgrave of Hesse-Homburg. She aroused a lot of attention with her marriages, which were considered scandalous.

== Life ==
=== First marriage ===
Margareta Brahe was the daughter of riksråd Count Abraham Pedersson Brahe of Visingsborg (1569–1630) and Elsa Gyllenstierna of Lundholm, and as such the sister of Per Brahe the Younger and Nils Brahe, and the cousin of Ebba Brahe. She belonged to one of the most prestigious noble families in Sweden and was related to the royal family. Contemporaries did not describe her as intelligent, but as a moderate character with a good sense of tact and decorum, and a cheerful temperament, lacking of any mind to plot or participate in intrigues at court. Physically, her health was somewhat delicate throughout her life.

She belonged to a family used to court service, her paternal aunt being the lady-in-waiting Margareta Brahe (1559–1638), and prior to her first marriage, she served as Hovfröken (maid-of-honour) to Queen Maria Eleonora. She was reportedly well liked by the queen, and was a part of the retinue accompanying her to the Thirty Years' War in Germany after the Battle of Breitenfeld in 1631.

On 4 July 1633, she married the riksråd and royal equerry baron Bengt Oxenstierna (1591–1643) in Stralsund, where she was at the time still serving as maid-on-honour to Maria Eleonora, after a three years' engagement. The couple returned to Sweden the following year, but her spouse was soon after appointed General Governor of Swedish Livonia, where they resided in Riga and Dorpat. The marriage was childless.

In June 1643, Margareta Brahe was widowed and returned to Sweden, and after her mourning period ended she returned to the royal court.

=== Second marriage ===
On 26 February 1644, Margareta Brahe was appointed to the office of Hovmastarinna ('Court Mistress' or Mistress of the Robes) to Queen Christina of Sweden. This was the highest-ranking office for a woman at the Swedish royal court, although the office was split during the reign of Christina, and she shared the office with Kerstin Bååt and Beata Oxenstierna.

During her tenure in office, she was regarded as an influential figure at court, and as other ladies-in-waiting she was able to use her position to benefit supplicants: such as to recommend a priest to an office at the new General Governor of Livonia, make an application for an officer to keep his regiment, and grant scholarships to students. In 1648, the queen's cousin Countess Palatine Eleonora Catherine of Zweibrücken referred to her as her "Dearest Protection", likely because Margareta Brahe had defended her when she gave birth to an illegitimate child.

At this point in life, she was apparently an attractive woman, and described as "the very lovely lady Brahe". In 1647, she received a proposal from the state official count Johan Oxenstierna, eldest son and heir of the all powerful chancellor count Axel Oxenstierna. Her suitor was eight years her junior and had been in love with her since before his marriage to Anna Sture (d. 1646), and when he became a widower, he proposed. The proposal and marriage caused a scandal and political difficulty at court. During this epoch, marriage within the nobility were political contracts made to create balance between the political noble fractions at court, where the monarch had to balance between the powerful Brahe and Oxenstierna parties. Consequently, a party pamphlet accused Axel Oxenstierna for having arranged the marriage to create an alliance between himself and Margareta's brother Per Brahe and his fraction, which caused political conflicts. This accusation was fueled by the fact that Axel Oxenstierna engaged his younger son Erik Oxenstierna to Margareta's niece Elsa Elisabeth Brahe, which made it possible for the marriage to take place without disturbing the power balance among the noble fractions.

In reality, however, Axel Oxenstierna was strongly against the marriage: his son had no children, and had proposed to a woman who had no children from her first marriage and was soon too likely be too old to have any. Furthermore, with such a swift marriage so soon after the death of his first wife, he might upset his rich former mother-in-law, the queen's former foster mother Ebba Leijonhufvud, who was childless and who might change her mind to make him her heir if he married so soon after the death of her daughter. He lectured his son and wrote: "Your mother and I could not but to like the person of the Lady Margareta and would with much pleasure like her as a daughter-in-law. However, we would not like to see all hope to have grandchildren by You vanish by Your marriage to her. You are our oldest son and after God our only hope and support. You are young still, hardly thirty-five, and I cannot understand why You would burden Yourself with an old and barren woman and thereby do what You may regret."

But Johan Oxenstierna was genuinely in love, wished to marry Margareta exclusively for emotional reasons and refused to consider political, economic or fertility reasons, and in July 1648, Johan Oxenstierna and Margareta Brahe eloped to Wismar in Germany, where they were wed. As the marriage was neither political, economic or intended to produce children, it was an obvious love match, which was controversial in an epoch where marriage was normally not conducted for love: it took place but four months after the death of the groom's first wife, and it also caused a scandal because of the age difference, when the bride rather than the groom was one decade senior.

The couple remained in Germany, where Johan Oxenstierna was a Swedish delegate during the Congress of Osnabrück, and Margareta Brahe reportedly played an important part during the Peace of Westphalia through her calming influence upon her hot-tempered husband, which benefited the sensitive negotiations. Johan Oxenstierna himself alluded to this in letters to his father: "I may admit, that if my wife had not been here, I would surely already have been lost."

The marriage was evidently happy, but childless. On 5 December 1657, Margareta Brahe became a childless widow a second time. The death of her second husband reportedly caused her such sorrow that she was confined to her bed for a long time.

=== Third marriage ===
After the death of her second spouse, Margareta Brahe was one of the richest people in Sweden. Her husband had inherited the 'Sture Inheritance' from Ebba Leijonhufvud (the mother of his first wife, heiress Anna Sture), and left all of it to Margareta Brahe in his will, and though she gave up some of it in a settlement with the relatives of Anna Sture in 1661, she had become very rich and thus an attractive marriage partner.

She continued to attend court, and accompanied the crown prince to the deathbed of Charles XI of Sweden in Gothenburg in 1660.

In 1660 she received two proposals of marriage: one from Louis Henry, Prince of Nassau-Dillenburg, 66 years old, thrice widowed with seventeen children and bad economy, and one from Frederick II, Landgrave of Hesse-Homburg, 27 years old, childless and never married. Louis Henry sent his ambassadors to Stockholm to negotiate and was supported by Margareta's brother Per Brahe, but Margareta Brahe herself stalled. Meanwhile, Frederick II was himself in Stockholm, and courted her personally, and Margareta Brahe chose to accept the proposal of Frederick II, thirty years younger than herself, which caused a major scandal. When Louis Henry sent his ambassador to Stockholm to negotiate further, regarding his proposal already accepted, he found that Margareta was already engaged to Frederick II. Louis Henry accused Margareta of having broken her promise of marriage and put forward diplomatic protests to Queen Dowager Regent Hedwig Eleonora and Per Brahe, but Margareta refused to be forced by Louis Henry or her brother and did not wait for the diplomatic conflict to be solved. On 12 May 1661, she married Frederick II in a grand wedding with elaborate celebrations at the royal court in Stockholm in the presence of the king and the queen dowager regent. The couple were reported to go well with each other sexually, but the wedding caused a great scandal and was much talked about in memoirs and letters of the time.

After a honeymoon in her estate Ekebyhov Margareta departed with her spouse to Germany and divided the rest of her life living at the court of Hesse-Homburg in Homburg and at estates bought around the city for her money. Though she was happy with her prestigious marriage, she missed Sweden and her relatives, but found interest in genealogical research.

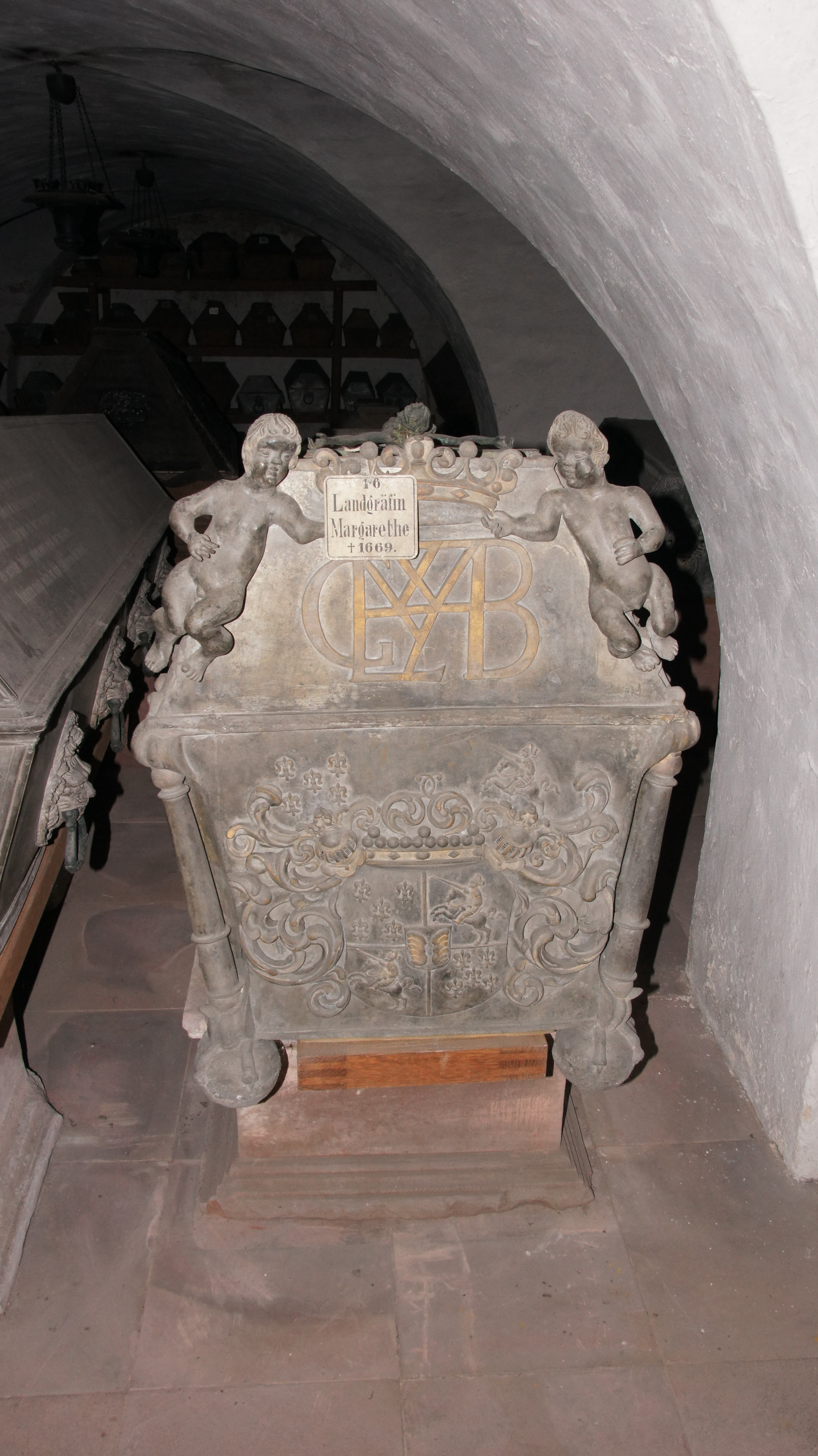
Coffin of Margareta Brahe in the crypt of Bad Homburg Castle, Homburg vor der Höhe.

Louis Henry published a written libel named Die untreue Margaretha Brahe ('The Adulterous Margaretha Brahe') in which he pointed out Margareta as an adulterer and Fredrik as a seducer, and demanded that they be punished in accordance with German law. The libel was a "Monstrosity of libelous slander, dysphemism and insinuations", and Louis Henry also published his correspondence with Margareta in order to prove her broken vows of marriage to him: there was however no proof that she had accepted his proposal, only that she had avoided to answer and encouraged him without saying yes. Frederick II published the more calm reply that his wife had refused Louis Henry when she was informed of his debauched lifestyle. This conflict caused a scandal in all of Germany and "affected the emotions of Margareta Brahe to a degree, that she thought herself dying", but through the mediation of her brother and several German Princes, the managed to effect a reconciliation with Louis Henry before his death in 1662.

At her death in 1669 she willed almost all of her fortune to her spouse "As a token of appreciation for the honour and loyalty always showed to her by her young consort." This also caused a scandal, as she left almost nothing to her relatives, and the spouse of her niece, Adolph John I, Count Palatine of Kleeburg, opposed the will without success. According to her dispositions, she was buried in the family vault of Bad Homburg Castle, next to her third husband.

== See also ==
- Christiana Oxenstierna

== Sources ==
- Wilhelmina Stålberg: Anteqningar om Svenska kvinnor (Notes on Swedish women) (Swedish)
- Gunnar Wetterberg: Kanslern Axel Oxenstierna (Chancillor Axel Oxenstierna)
- Svante Norrhem : Kvinnor vid maktens sida 1632-1772 (Women alongside power 1632–1772)
- Margareta Brahe, urn:sbl:18049, Svenskt biografiskt lexikon (art av O. Walde.), hämtad 2017-12-05.

Court offices
| Preceded by Beata Oxenstierna (With Ebba Ryning) | Mistress of the Robes to the Queen of Sweden; 1644–1648 (With Kerstin Bååt) | Succeeded by Barbro Fleming (With Maria Sofia De la Gardie) |
