= Maksymilian Guldenstern =

Polish–Lithuanian politician (died 1678)

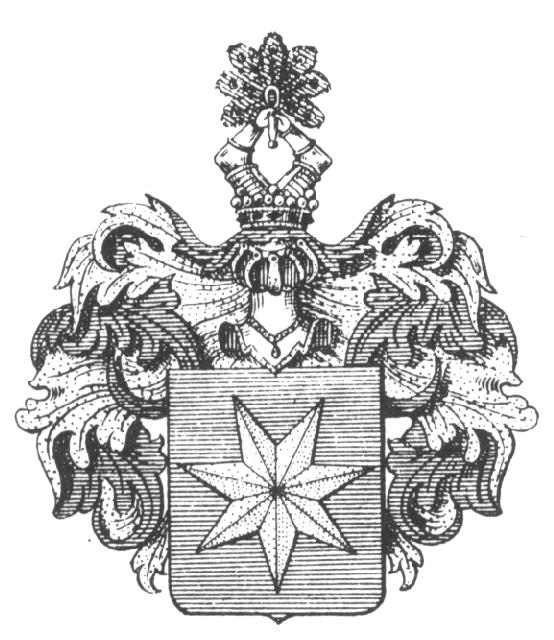
- The coat of arms of the heraldic clan of Gyllenstierna.

Castellan of Elbląg
- In office 1667–1678

Secular senator of the Polish–Lithuanian Commonwealth
- In office 1667–1678
- Constituency: Malbork Voivodeship

Secular senator at the election sejm of 1669
- In office 2 May 1669 – 19 June 1669
- Constituency: Malbork Voivodeship

Personal details
- Died: 1678
- Occupation: Politician

Maksymilian Guldenstern (Polish: [mak.sɘˈmi.ljan ɡulˈdɛn.stɛrn]; German: [ˈɡʊl.dənˌʃtɛʁn]; died 1678), also known as Maksymilian Gyllenstierna (Polish: [ɡɘ̟l.lɛnˈstjɛr.na]; Swedish: [ˈjʏ̌lənˌɧæːɳa]), was a nobleman and politician who served as the castellan of Elbląg in the Polish–Lithuanian Commonwealth from 1667 to 1678. With said office, he was also a secular senator of the Polish–Lithuanian Commonwealth, as one of the representatives of Malbork Voivodeship. In 1669, as a senator, he was a member of the election sejm of 1669, during which he voted for king Michał Korybut Wiśniowiecki.

== Biography ==
Maksymilian Guldenstern was the son of Johan Nilsson Gyllenstierna, an aristocrat from Sweden, who was an admiral in the Polish–Lithuanian Commonwealth Navy. His paternal grandfather, Nils Göransson Gyllenstierna, served as the Lord High Chancellor of Sweden from 1561 to 1590, and as the Lord High Chancellor of Sweden from 1590 to 1601. Maksymilian Guldenstern belonged to the heraldic clan of Gyllenstierna.

Guldenstern served as the castellan of Elbląg in the Polish–Lithuanian Commonwealth from 1667 to 1678. With said office, he was also a secular senator of the Polish–Lithuanian Commonwealth, as one of the representatives of Malbork Voivodeship. In 1669, as a senator, he was a member of the election sejm of 1669, during which he voted for king Michał Korybut Wiśniowiecki. He died in 1678.
