= County of Raseborg =

Historical county in Finland

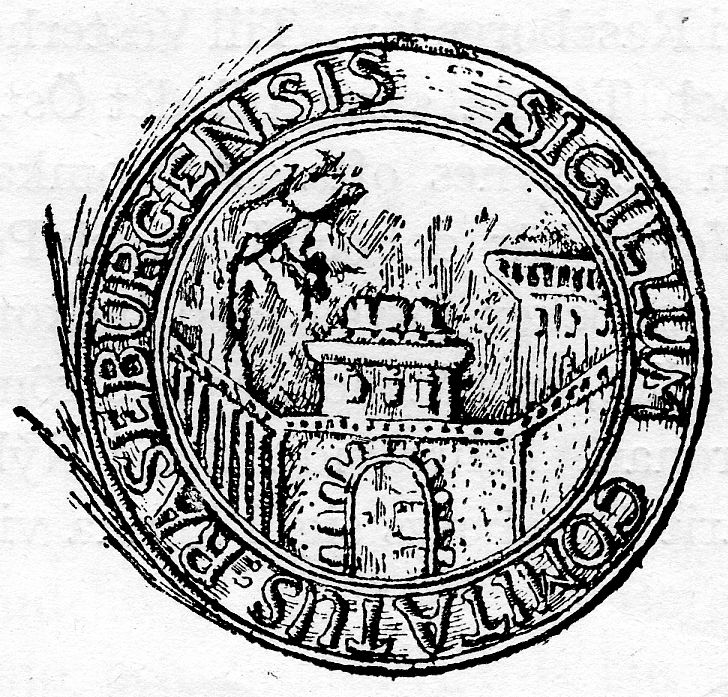
Seal of the County of Raseborg

The County of Raseborg (Finnish: Raaseporin kreivikunta; Swedish: Raseborgs grevskap) was a historic county in southern Finland. It was donated posthumously to Sten Eriksson Leijonhufvud, whose wife Ebba Leijonhufvud became its first holder in 1569. The county was passed down in the Leijonhufvud family until the Crown recaptured it in the Great Reduction of 1680.

== History ==
Sten Eriksson Leijonhufvud (1518—1568) was a Swedish diplomat and one of Sweden's leading noblemen. During the rebellion of the dukes John and Charles against their older brother King Eric XIV, he sided with the dukes. After the gates of Stockholm were opened to the rebels, the fleeing king struck Sten Eriksson, who later died of his wounds. After his death the county of Raseborg was given to his widow Ebba Leijonhufvud and his descendants in "perpetuity".

The county was confiscated twice by the Crown. First from Sten Eriksson and Ebba's eldest son Axel Stensson Leijonhufvud (1554—1619) in 1600. Axel Stensson was one of the judges in the trial of the deposed King Sigismund's privy council. He objected to their harsh sentence and fell out of favor with the new King Charles IX. Axel Stensson was forced to flee the country and all his possessions in Sweden were confiscated, including the County of Raseborg, which was handed over to his younger brother Mauritz Stensson Leijonhufvud. Mauritz had also been a judge in the Linköping trials and in the preceding trials of Sigismund's Finnish supporters.

Sten Axelsson Leijonhufvud was granted the County of Raseborg in 1608. Sten Axelsson had married a German woman, Magdalena von Manderscheid-Virneburg in 1605 and beginning with the County of Manderscheid in 1615, acquired estates in Germany. In 1628, the same year Sweden entered the Thirty Years' War against the Holy Roman Empire, Sten Axelsson married his daughter to a Habsburg general. The Crown did not look kindly on Sten Axelsson's ties to Germany and, after the Swedish war effort suffered major setbacks in 1634—1635, his estates were confiscated. The County of Raseborg was given over to his nephew Gustaf Adolf Lewenhaupt.

== Territory ==
The original donation of 1569 consisted of the Raseborg castle, town of Ekenäs and the parishes of Karis and Ingå as well as the village of Töytäri in Lojo parish. In 1649 rest of the parish of Lojo was added to the donation along with the parishes of Pojo, Karislojo, Sjundeå and Vichtis. The administrative center of the county was a manor house on the north side of Ekenäs.

== Holders ==
Over its history, the county was held by the following persons:

- 1569—1585 Ebba Leijonhufvud (née Lilliehöök)
- 1585—1600 Axel Leijonhufvud
- 1600—1607 Mauritz Leijonhufvud
- 1607—1608 Amalia Leijonhufvud (née von Hatzfeld)
- 1608—1632 Sten Leijonhufvud
- 1636—1656 Gustaf Adolf Lewenhaupt
- 1656—1659 Jakob Kasimir Leijonhufvud
- 1659—1680 Gustav Mauritz Leijonhufvud
