= 1565 in Sweden =

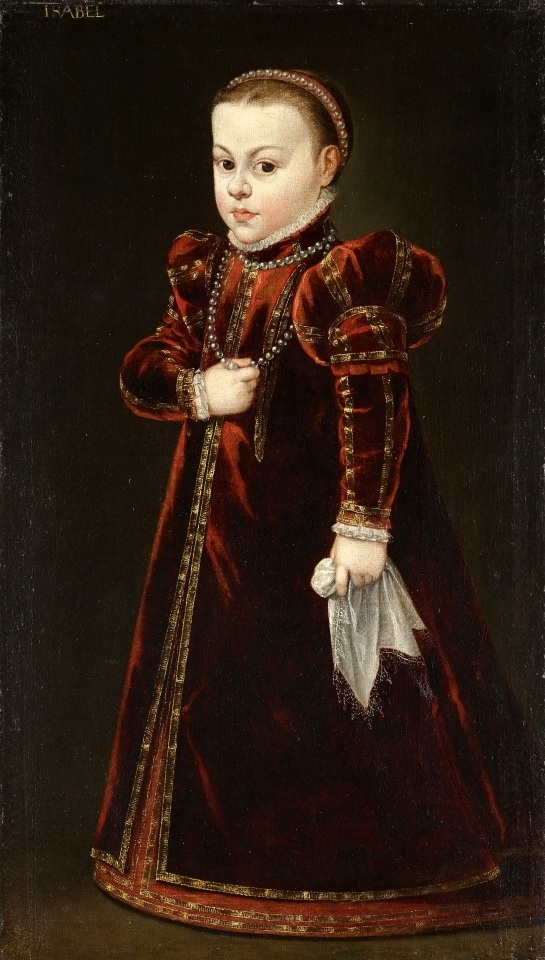
Verwilt Isabella Vasa

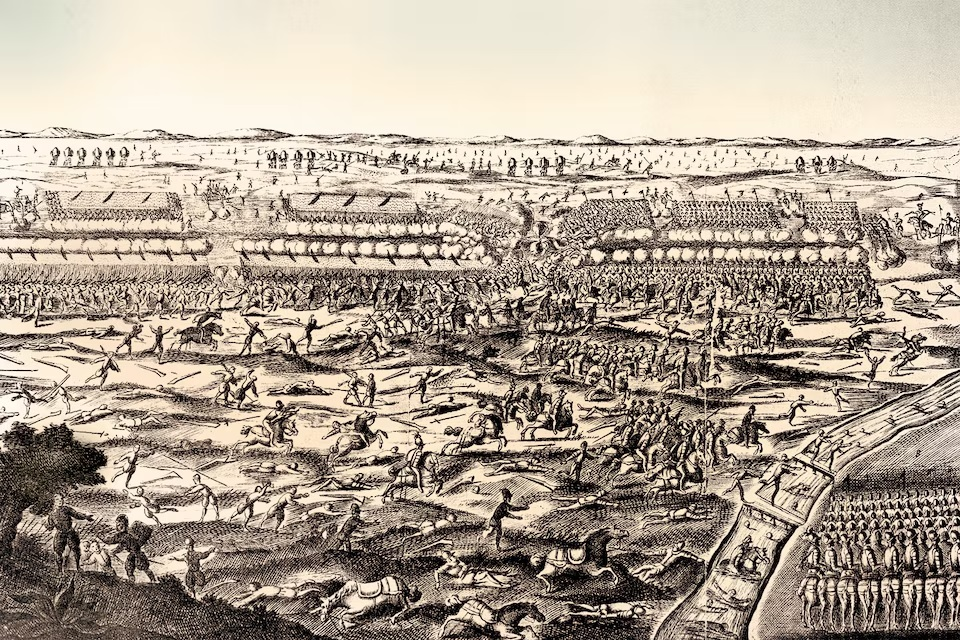
Battle of Axtorna

Events from the year 1565 in Sweden

== Incumbents ==
- Monarch – Eric XIV

== Events ==
- January - The Swedes sack the Danish provinces of Scania and Halland under Klas Horn.
- 21 May - Swedish victory in the Sea Battle in Pomerania.
- 4 June - Action of 4 June 1565
- 9 June - The Teutonic Order declares war against Sweden in Livonia.
- 7 July - Action of 7 July 1565
- July - The Danes burn Swedish Lödöse.
- 13 August - Swedish victory at the Battle of Obermühlenberg.
- 28 August - Danish Varberg is conquered by the Swedes.
- 8 September - Princess Cecilia of Sweden arrives on her official visit to England. Among the persons in her retinue is Helena Snakenborg.
- 20 October - Battle of Axtorna
- - Sweden is struck by the plague.

== Births ==
- 10 November - Laurentius Paulinus Gothus, theologian, astronomer and archbishop (died 1646)
