= Ebba Brahe =

Swedish countess, landowner, and courtier

- Oval miniature portrait of Ebba Brahe in gouache on parchment, 17th century
- Born: 16 March 1596
- Died: 5 January 1674 (aged 77)
- Other name: Ebba Magnusdotter Brahe
- Spouse(s): Jacob De la Gardie (m. 1618–52; his death)
- Partner: Gustavus Adolphus of Sweden
- Children: 14, including: Magnus Gabriel De la Gardie; Maria Sofia De la Gardie; Axel Julius De la Gardie
- Parent(s): Magnus Brahe; Britta Stensdotter Leijonhuvud
- Relatives: Margareta Brahe (paternal cousin); Per Brahe the Younger (paternal cousin)

Ebba Magnusdotter Brahe (16 March 1596 – 5 January 1674) was a Swedish countess, landowner, and courtier. She is foremost known for being the love object of King Gustavus Adolphus of Sweden, who wished to marry her prior to his own marriage, a plan which was however never realized. Their love affair, the subject of fiction, has become famous in Swedish romantic history and is documented in their preserved correspondence.

== Biography ==
=== Early life ===
Ebba Brahe was born to Magnus Brahe and Britta Stensdotter Leijonhuvud. She was the cousin of Margareta Brahe, Nils Brahe and Per Brahe the Younger. After the death of her mother, she was sent to the royal court to finish her upbringing. She served as maid of honor to Queen Dowager Christina of Holstein-Gottorp, who had been a personal friend to her mother, from 1611–1614, and to the elder queen dowager, Catherine Stenbock, from 1614–1618. She was described as a beauty who suffered from a "chronic cough" and recurring fever. John, Duke of Östergötland, was among her admirers.

At the royal court, she met King Gustavus Adolphus, who was her second cousin, once removed; they fell in love and wished to marry each other. It is not known exactly when their love affair started. By the letters exchanged between them, it seems that they were both equally in love with each other. Their first preserved love letters are from 6 March 1613, when their relationship was apparently already long established. In this letter, the king asked her to inform her father of his wish to marry her and give them their blessing. The marriage plans were however opposed by the queen dowager, who was the de facto ruler during her son's first years. She wished for her son to enter an arranged dynastic marriage of political convenience, and she regarded a marriage to a member of the national nobility politically risky and regarded the late queen Gunilla Bielke, who had been criticized for using her position to benefit her family, as a bad example of such a marriage. The dispute between the dowager queen, the king and Ebba Brahe about the marriage continued until 1615, and has been the subject of romantic plays, stories and poems for centuries. The queen dowager harassed her maid of honor Brahe and told her not to trust the promises of the king, which made the father of Brahe unwilling to give his blessing. The king tried to convince his mother with his half-sister Princess Catherine, Duke Henry Julius of Saxony, and chancellor Nils Chesnecopherus with messengers.

The queen dowager promised to consider the marriage if they agreed to a couple of years consideration, and the couple corresponded during his absence in the war. In 1614, she was moved from the court of Queen Dowager Christina to that of Queen Dowager Catherine to place her further away from the king. The 10 October, she wrote: "It is not suited from me as a humble lady to desire the person of Your Majesty". In spring 1615, it was made clear that the queen dowager would never give her permission. During this time, the king himself had an affair with Margareta Slots during his absence in the war, which was to have helped Brahe to make her mind. The most famous trivia about this dispute, if indeed it happened, is believed to have taken place shortly after this, and is as follows. The queen dowager passed a window at the Stockholm Palace, followed by Ebba Brahe. On the windowpane, the queen dowager wrote with a diamond ring: "One thing you want, one thing you shall; that is the way in cases such as this", and left. Ebba Brahe stepped forward and wrote in reply: "I am happy with what I have and thank my God for the grace of that". By this, Ebba Brahe accepted that her relationship with the monarch could never be official.

The same year, she received a marriage proposal from Count Jacob De la Gardie, which she accepted two years later: 11 November 1617, her engagement was celebrated at the court of Queen Dowager Catherine, and on 24 June 1618, Ebba Brahe married Jacob De la Gardie in the presence of the two queen dowagers and the brother of the king in Stockholm.

=== Later life ===
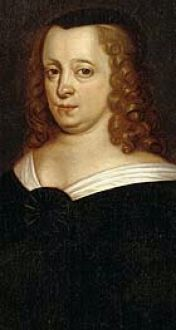
Ebba Brahe in the dress of a widow.

After her wedding, Ebba moved with Jacob to Swedish Estonia, where he served as governor, and lived with him there from 1619 until 1628. Their relationship was described as happy, and Ebba was almost always pregnant during much of her marriage, giving birth almost once a year. The couple were more devoted to each other than to their children; the death of their first child and son in 1632 was not even painful for his parents, who did not attend his funeral. Because of the frequent absence of her spouse in service, Ebba was given responsibility for the family finances, and she moved extensively between Sweden and Estonia to manage the family estates. In 1628, the couple settled in Sweden. Ebba Brahe was very fashion-conscious and became known for her extravagant lifestyle and her taste for luxury. On the other hand, this may not have been done out of simple vanity. Twenty-first century forensic examinations revealed she had a significant calcium deficiency, a consequence of constant pregnancies. This medical condition may have caused her much ill health, dental pain, and a poor overall appearance.

Ebba Brahe also played a part at the royal court. In 1651, the historian Arnold Johan Messenius and his son accused her of having persuaded Queen Christina not to marry by the use of witchcraft. Such an accusation about a nobleman could not be accepted, and the accusation eventually led to the accusers being decapitated for treason.

She favored her son Magnus Gabriel and was said to have spoiled him while attending to his career. She was proud of his position as favourite to Queen Christina of Sweden and supported his marriage to the queen's cousin, Princess Maria Eufrosyne von Zweibrücken-Kleeburg. When Magnus Gabriel lost his position as favorite with the queen in 1653, Ebba Brahe fell upon her knees before the queen to ask him to forgive him, and she also sought the help of Axel Oxenstierna to reinstate him in favor, though she privately blamed the Oxenstierna party for having caused the fall of Magnus Gabriel. During the minor regency of Charles XI in 1660–1672, her son Magnus Gabriel was one of the leading members and rulers of Sweden. Ebba Brahe actively used her influence over her son to put forward both her own and various supplicants demands, recommendations and suggestions.

Ebba Brahe also became known as a businessperson. As a widow, Ebba Brahe became one of the many powerful female landholders such as Barbro Påle, Sophia Drake, Margareta Huitfeldt and Margareta von Ascheberg who occupied a significant place in the local legends of Sweden during the 16th and 17th centuries. She became a successful landholder, managed her estates and expanded them. She acquired new estates from the formerly Danish province Skåne, which became a Swedish province in 1658 and had many large estates which were left behind by the Danish nobility.

After her husband's death in 1652, she successfully petitioned Queen Christina I of Sweden to found the city of Jakobstad in Finland, named in honor of her late husband. A street in Jakobstad, Ebba Brahe Esplanaden, has been named after her.

== In fiction ==
A play called Gustav Adolf och Ebba Brahe was written about Ebba Brahe by Gustav III of Sweden. It was composed by Johan Henric Kellgren and was performed in the Gripsholm Castle Theatre in 1785; the play presents her son Magnus Gabriel De la Gardie as the son of the king. The play was performed at the Royal Swedish Opera in 1787 with Franziska Stading as Ebba Brahe.

== Family ==
Ebba's marriage with Jacob produced 14 children in just 19 years, but only half of her children lived to mature adulthood:

1. Pontus De la Gardie (1619–1632), died unmarried.
2. Christina De la Gardie (1620-1622), died in childhood.
3. Sophia De la Gardie (1621-1621), died in infancy.
4. Magnus Gabriel De la Gardie (1622–1686), Lord High Chancellor of the Privy Council of Sweden.
5. Brita De la Gardie (1624-1624), died in infancy.
6. Gustaf Adolph De la Gardie (1626-1630), died in childhood.
7. Maria Sofia De la Gardie (1627–1694); married Gustaf Gabrielsson Oxenstierna, nephew of regent Axel Oxenstierna.
8. Jakob Kasimir De la Gardie (1629–1658); married Ebba Sparre, intimate friend of Queen Christina of Sweden.
9. Pontus Frederick De la Gardie (1630–1692).
10. Christina Catharine De la Gardie (1632–1704); married Gustaf Otto Stenbock, mother of Magnus Stenbock.
11. Johann Karl De la Gardie (1634-1634), died in infancy.
12. Birgitta Helena De la Gardie (1636-1636), died in infancy.
13. Axel Julius De la Gardie (1637–1710), Field Marshal and Governor-General over Estonia.
14. Ebba Margaretha De La Gardie (1638–1696).

None of the children are believed to have been fathered by King Gustavus Adolphus.

== Notes ==
Gustavus Adolphus' paternal grandmother, Margaret Eriksdotter Leijonhufvud, and Ebba Brahe's father's maternal grandmother, Brita Eriksdotter Leijonhufvud, were sisters.

== Bibliography ==
- historiska-personer.nu
- Westerlund, Kerstin (2004), "Kvinnliga brukspatroner", Tekniska museet
- Norrhem, Svante (2007). Kvinnor vid maktens sida : 1632-1772. Lund: Nordic Academic Press. Libris 10428618. ISBN 978-91-89116-91-7
- Biografi i Nordisk familjebok (andra upplagan, 1905)
- Ebba Brahe, urn:sbl:18040, Svenskt biografiskt lexikon (art av G. Jacobson.), hämtad 2015-07-08.
