= Axel Julius De la Gardie =

Swedish field marshal (1637–1710)

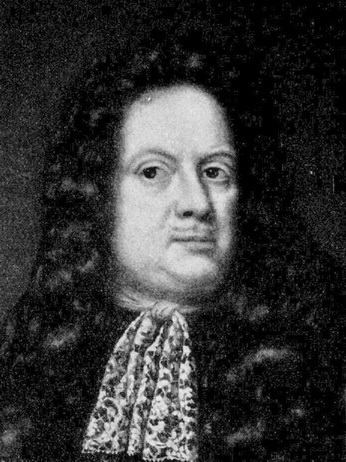
Axel Julius de la Gardie.

Axel Julius de la Gardie (1637–17 May 1710 in Stockholm) was a Swedish field marshal and was appointed Governor-General over Estonia from 1687 to 1704.

Axel Julius was the son of military commander Jacob De la Gardie and Ebba Brahe. He became colonel of an infantry regiment and the Västgöta cavalry regiment and in 1664 he attained the rank of major general in the cavalry, and was a colonel in the Royal Guard. In 1668 he became lieutenant general and later field marshal.

Upon the threat of war with Russia, he received orders to command the troops in Finland and Ingria and take necessary defensive actions. At the landtag he held in 1676 in Åbo (Turku), the government granted the request of new war efforts.

He married Sofia Juliana Arvidsdotter Forbus in 1664. He is the father of Magnus Julius De la Gardie.

== See also ==
- List of Swedish field marshals

Preceded by Anders Torstensson	Governor General of Swedish Estonia; 1687–1704	Succeeded by Wolmar Anton von Schlippenbach
