= Krapperup Castle =

Estate in Scania, Sweden

- Krapperups slott
- Höganäs Municipality
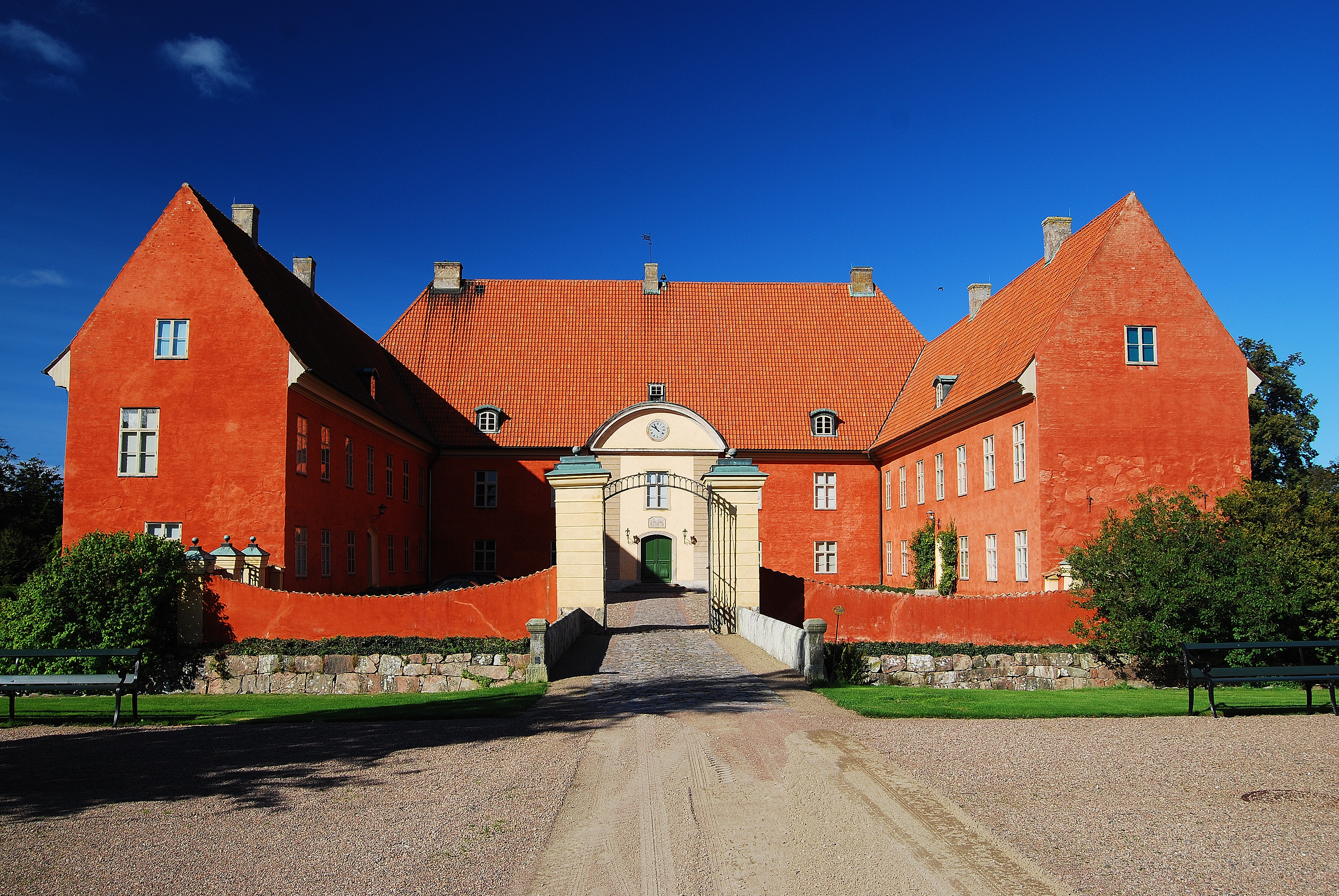
- Krapperup Castle

Site information
- Open to the public: The garden is open but not the castle.

Location
- Scania, Sweden
- Coordinates: 56.262°N 12.530°E

Site history
- Built: 1570; 456 years ago

Krapperup Castle (Swedish: Krapperups slott) is an estate at Höganäs Municipality in Scania, Sweden. The foundation Gyllenstiernska Krapperupstiftelsen has been the owner of Krapperup with its land areas and other properties since 1967.

== History ==
The original castle building was constructed between 1314 and 1353. The builder was a Johannes Jonaesson (in Danish Jens Jenssøn). A rectangular stone house, containing the mayor's residence and banquet hall, was the main building. Around this stone house, farm buildings of various kinds were erected, such as cookhouses and storerooms. Around the middle of the 14th century, the castle began to be fortified with a ring wall, gate tower, moat and drawbridge. New farm buildings of stone, brick and timber were built inside the ring wall.

In the middle of the 16th century, the large rectangular brick main house was built in Renaissance style. In 1667, the Danish noble family Rantzau sold Krapperup to Swedish Countess Maria Sofia De la Gardie (1627–1694). During her time the manor house was rebuilt in Baroque style. Petter Gotthard von Kochen had Krapperup restored in Rococo during the period 1750–60. In the 19th century, the surrounding area was transformed into an English style garden by owners Nils and Ellen Gyllenstierna. Their son diplomat Eric Gyllenstierna af Lundholm (1882–1940) inherited the estate.

== See also ==
- List of castles in Sweden

== Other sources ==
- Ranby, Caroline (2003) Krapperup mellan renässans och skiftesreformer (Nyhamnsläge: Gyllenstiernska Krapperupstiftelsen) ISBN 91-8794410-3
- Ullgren Peter (2007) Ur Krapperups historia (Nyhamnsläge: Gyllenstiernska Krapperupstiftelsen) ISBN 99-1957214-4
