= Parliamentary Ombudsman (Sweden) =

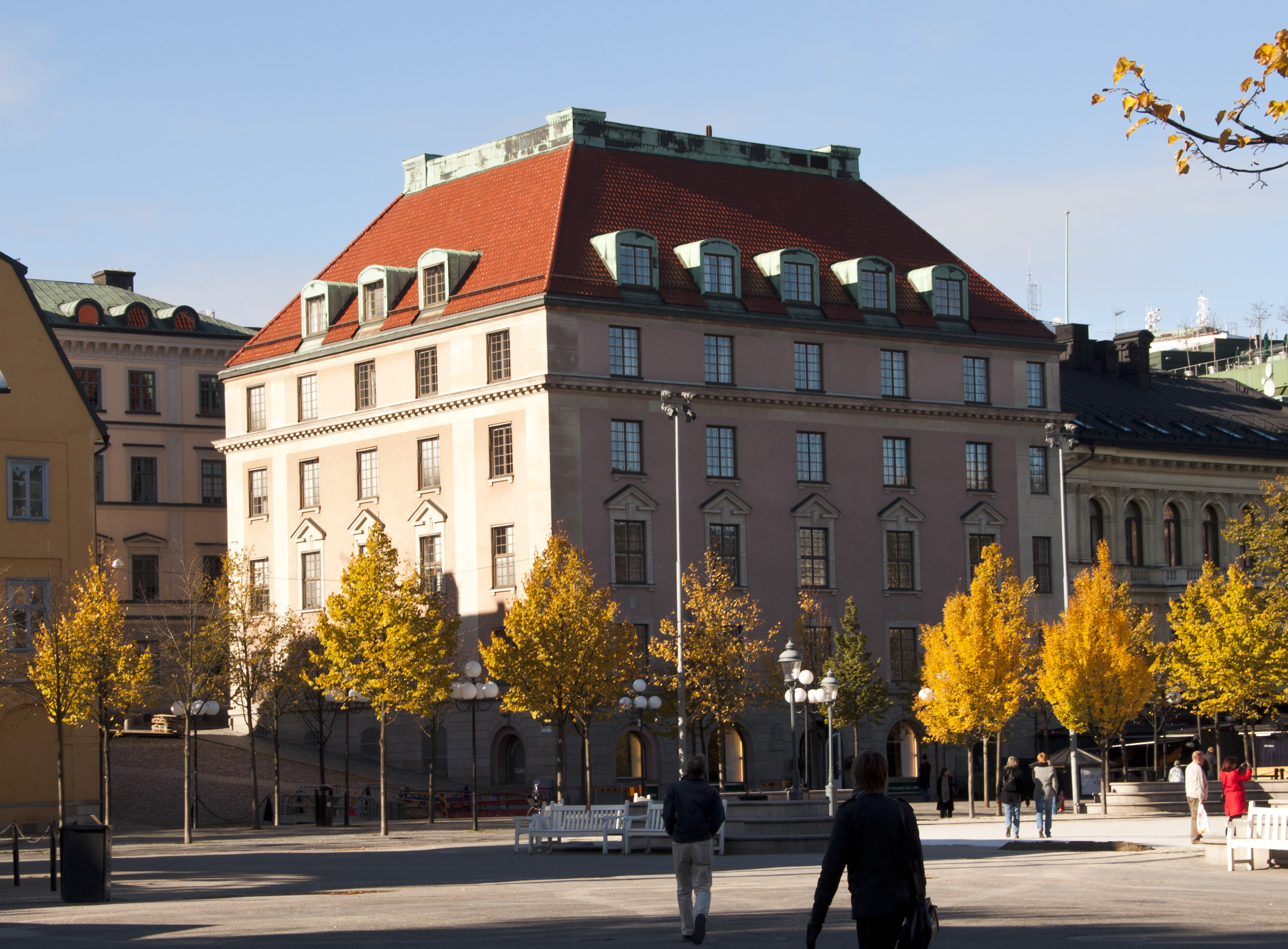
The Swedish Parliamentary Ombudsman headquarters in Stockholm

The Parliamentary Ombudsman (Swedish: Justitieombudsmannen, JO) is the ombudsman elected by the Riksdag for six-year terms and are directly responsible to the Riksdag by the Riksdag that reviews authorities to make sure they comply with laws and regulations that govern their work especially laws that affect the rights and obligations of individuals in relation to the public. There are four Ombudsmen. They are completely independent in their work and decisions; no Ombudsman can influence the cases of the others.

The modern use of the term “ombudsman” began with the Swedish Ombudsman in 1809. The JO employs nearly 90 people, of whom around 60 are lawyers.

== Mission ==
The Ombudsman's task is to supervise the application of laws and other regulations in public activities on behalf of the Riksdag. The supervision covers both courts and other authorities as well as employed officials. The starting point for the Ombudsman's activities is the individual's interest in being subject to lawful and otherwise correct treatment by the authorities. The office of Ombudsman is part of the constitutional protection of the individual's fundamental rights and freedoms.

The Ombudsman has been described as the "Constitutional watchdog" of Sweden. There has been proposals to strengthen the office of the Ombudsman as it currently cannot enforce any sanctions on authorities that break the law, due to the office historically being seen as a pillar of "respect" with the problem that more government agencies have started to ignore its reports.

== Composition ==
Current Ombudsmen:

- Erik Nymansson, since 2021 (Chief Ombudsman)
- Thomas Norling, since 2018
- Katarina Påhlsson, since 2019
- Per Lennerbrant, since 2019
