= Karin Gyllenstierna =

Swedish courtier

Karin Göransdotter Gyllenstierna (before 1538 – died between 1602 and 1605) was a Swedish courtier. She served as Chief Court Mistress to queen Catherine Jagellon and, after her death, to Princess Anna Vasa of Sweden.

== Biography ==
=== Private life ===
Karin was the daughter of riksråd Göran Eriksson Gyllenstierna of Fogelvik (- 1575) and Kerstin Nilsdotter Grip (- 1538). She was thereby a relative of the famous Christina Gyllenstierna. She married Nils Månsson Natt och Dag in 1553. She was thereby the sister-in-law of Margareta Birgersdotter Grip, who were also her neighbor on the estate Bro. She became a widow in 1554, and gave birth to her son Nils Nilsson Natt och Dag (1554-1613) posthumously. As the guardian of her son, she managed his estate until he was declared of legal majority in 1573.

In 1566, she became engaged to riksråd Ivar Ivarsson Liljeörn. She never married him, but the couple consummated their engagement and had a son, Ivar Ivarsson (1567-1590). In 1567, her fiancé was murdered during the Sture Murders. Despite never being married to Liljeörn, she took control of his property, considering it the inheritance of herself and her son after her betrothed. This entangled her in a lawsuit over the inheritance with his relatives, which lasted for the rest of her life. In 1587, the King declared his support for her right in the dispute. This did not end it, however. In 1594, her rights were for a second time confirmed over that of the relatives of her late fiancé, but again without the feud being put to an end.

=== Court life ===
Karin Gyllenstierna was given the position of senior lady in waiting and Mistress of the Robes, or hovmastarinna (Court Mistress), to queen Catherine Jagellon. After the death of the queen in 1583, she was given the equivalent position at the court of Princess Anna Vasa of Sweden. She is mentioned in this position in 1587, when the next Mistress of the Robes to the (new) queen of Sweden is also recorded.

In 1591, Anna is recorded having a new court mistress. Her son Nils had the position of ceremony master at the court of first queen Gunilla Bielke and then the next queen, Christina of Holstein-Gottorp, and her grand daughter, Christina Natt och Dag was, in 1639, appointed joint foster mother to queen Christina of Sweden alongside Ebba Mauritzdotter Leijonhufvud.

=== Death ===
The year of her death is not known. She was still alive in 1602, when her son Nils acted as her representative in her endless inheritance dispute with the family of her late fiancé, but she was dead by 1605, when her son acted in his own name in the same dispute. At that point, she was stated to be dead.

Court offices
Preceded by Elin Andersdotter	Mistress of the Robes to the Queen of Sweden; 1568–1583	Succeeded by Kerstin Oxenstierna
