= Nils Göransson Gyllenstierna =

Swedish statesman and lord

Nils Gyllenstierna
- Friherre; Nils Göransson Gyllenstierna
- Gyllenstierna, 1575-1600

Lord High Steward Lord High Justiciar of the Realm
- In office 10 September 1590 – October 1601
- Monarchs: See list: Johan III; Sigismund III
- Preceded by: Per Brahe the Elder
- Succeeded by: Mauritz Leijonhufvud

Lord High Chancellor
- In office 29 September 1560 – 17 November 1592
- Monarchs: See list: Eric XIV; Johan III
- Lord High Constable: See list: Svante Sture the Younger; Gustaf Olofsson Stenbock; Klaus Fleming
- Lord High Steward: See list: Per Brahe the Elder
- Preceded by: Georg Norman
- Succeeded by: Erik Larsson Sparre
Privy Council
President of the Council of the Realm
In office 29 September 1560 – 17 November 1592
Monarchs	See list: Eric XIV; Johan III
Lord High Constable	See list: Svante Sture the Younger; Gustaf Olofsson Stenbock; Klaus Fleming
Lord High Steward	See list: Per Brahe the Elder
Preceded by	Georg Norman
Succeeded by	Erik Larsson Sparre
- Born: 1530; Stockholm, Sweden
- Spouse: See list
- Issue: See list
Names
- Nils Göransson Gyllenstierna, 1st Baron of Lundhholm
- House: Gyllenstierna
- Father: Göran Eriksson (Gyllenstierna) (1498-1576)
- Mother: Kristina Nilsdotter (Grip)

Nils Göransson Gyllenstierna (Note: According to the National Archives of Sweden the second name might be Jöransson) (Swedish pronunciation: [ˈnɪls ˈjø̂ːranˌsɔn ˈjʏ̌lənˌɧæːɳa]; c. 1526 - October 1601; sometimes Nils Jöransson, or Nisse Gyllenstierna) was a Swedish statesman and aristocrat who was Lord High Chancellor of Sweden from 1561 to 1590 and Lord high Steward of Sweden from 1590 to 1601. He is most known for assisting Johan III in ascending the Swedish throne.

== Early life ==
=== Childhood and schooling: 1530-1550 ===
Nils Gyllenstierna was born in 1530, the oldest of five children of Privy Councillor Göran Eriksson Gyllenstierna and Kerstin Grip. On his father's side, he was a member of the aristocracy as a descendent of Danish Pricy Councillor Niels Eriksson to Aagaard and Restrup in Jutland. His father Göran Eriksson Gyllenstierna, as the stadtholder of Eric XI dukedom of Kalmar, Kronoberg and Öland, was one of the first to swear allegiance to Eric XI and became his most trusted advisor. His mother, Kerstin, was a daughter of the House of Grip, a powerful dynasty in middle-age Sweden.

In 1542, his father, Göran, was sent to command combatants for the king in the Dacke War. In 1541, Gyllenstierna was enrolled at Martin Luther University Halle-Wittenberg, and as late as 1563, after being appointed Lord High Chancellor of Sweden, he enrolled in the register of the University of Rostock. He is noted to have undertaken extensive travels before returning to Sweden, where he, upon his return in 1560, was appointed to preside over the chancellery of Duke Eric by Gustav Vasa.

== Career ==
=== Under Eric XIV reign ===
By the end of 1560, Gyllenstierna was sent as envoy to England. He was supposed to arrange marriage between Elizabeth I and Eric XIV but failed. The mission was in part to remove King Eric XIV rival Robert Dudley, 1st Earl of Leicester. The National Archives of Sweden notes that his first audience with Elizabeth I took place on 2 April 1561 and the Queen declined the marriage proposal. By November 1561, Gyllenstierna notes that he had been received in audience fifty-five times. On 2 January 1652, he presented the Queen with a new proposal where Eric XIV would marry Queen Mary. Gyllenstierna wrote:

"Her Majesty [Queen Elizabeth I] reacted noticeably, though this manoeuvre did not bring about any decisive change either"

— National Archives of Sweden, Gyllenstierna, 1562

By the summer of 1561, Eric XIV had contemplated whether or not he should assassinate his love-rival, Leicester. Gyllenstierna had strongly advised against it and deterred the King through a letter to the Privy Council of Sweden.

"[…] vengeance should be left to God, and such an act would taint Eric’s Christian reputation, as such a secret could not be kept. By the time Erik revisited the plan, Gyllenstierna had already left England."

— National Archives of Sweden, Gyllenstierna, 1562

In 1562, the same year that he returned home from England, he was sent as envoy to the imperial court of Ferdinand I. During his long stay in Germany, he had the unenviable task of carrying out Erik XIV's diplomatic assignments. On 13 September 1562, he was ordered to go to Hesse to conclude the marriage negotiations with Philip I, Landgrave of Hesse. These negotiations were broken off in February 1564. In response to Emperor Maximilian II’s protest against Swedish trade policy in Estonia, including the blockade of Narva, Gyllenstierna was also tasked with the delivery of Eric XIV correspondence and the negotiations between the states. The National Archives of Sweden states that his instructions were dated November and December 1562. On 17 March 1563, Gyllenstierna presented Eric XIV's Machiavellian views to the Maximilian II, through a letter which was written in Latin. On 19 March 1563, the letter was answered, followed by a petition from Gyllenstierna the same day. On 27 March 1563, he submitted a final presentation. The envoy of Eric XIV did not achieve any concrete results, and the Holy Roman Empire retained its opposing stance to the Baltic issue.

On his way back from the Holy Roman Empire, Gyllenstierna crossed the Rhine, while his servants were sent back with copies of the emperor's responses. In Deventer, he was warned by Vorthusen and other friends about the Frederick II of Denmark’s mercenaries. He then traveled by sea to Friesland, where he received assistance, and continued his journey home aboard a ship from Älvsborg. Near the Swedish skerries, they encountered Danish warships that had seized the salt ships of merchants from Lödöse, forcing them to head toward the Norwegian coast. Gyllenstierna then made his way back to Holland. On 1 August 1563, he wrote a letter to Eric XIV recounting these events. In the letter, he emphasized the need to lift the Danish blockade of Älvsborg so that:

"the Western Sea becomes free and unobstructed for all supplies to the Swedish realm."

— Gyllenstierna letter to Eric XIV, 1563

He stated that if he had credit, he would purchase two or three warships in Holland and attempt to return home. However, he was forced to take out a loan for himself and was also concerned about the debts he had incurred in England, a problem that would later require attention.

The following summer, Gyllenstierna stayed in Rostock, where he had to deliver Erik XIV's apology for the absence of the Swedish envoys from the peace congress, related to Northern Seven Years' War, and scheduled to be held in the same city.

Subsequently, Gyllenstierna began negotiations with John Frederick II of Saxony-Weimar for an alliance with Sweden against Denmark and Elector Augustus of Saxony. For most of 1565, he stayed in Stralsund and did not return to Sweden until the autumn, where he acted as a negotiator with Dancay and served as an associate member of the de facto Supreme Court of Sweden called the High Court.

In the winter of 1566, he was sent to Russia, where in 1567 he concluded a treaty with the tsar. Among other provisions, the treaty included a promise to hand over Catherine Jagiellon to Russia.

Upon his return to Sweden, he was involved in sentencing the king's powerful secretary, Jöran Persson, to death.

=== Under Johan III reign ===
Gyllenstierna continued to enjoy the king's favor and was involved in the negotiations in 1568 with the Russian delegation that had arrived in Stockholm. During the dukes' rebellion, unlike his father, he sided with Erik XIV until he could safely abandon him.

On September 28, 1568, he was among those who promised to let the rebels into Stockholm. The ascension of John III to the throne did not disrupt his royal favor. He retained his position as Lord High Chancellor of Sweden, was appointed Lawman of the Tiohärad district in 1569, and was made a baron that same year.

In 1570, he received Lundholmen in Småland as a barony. The barony was formed from the extensive estates of Nydala Abbey, which had been confiscated by the crown during the Reformation.

Gyllenstierna also continued his diplomatic activities. He participated in the peace negotiations with Denmark and Lübeck in the summer of 1569 and at the congress in Stettin in 1570, which resulted in the Treaty of Stettin. The signing of the Treaty of Stettin marked the end of his diplomatic career, although he was appointed as a representative at the border meetings with Denmark in both 1575 and 1580.

John III entrusted him with the "Supreme Command over All of Småland." The position likely proved too burdensome for him due to his poor health, for when the king tasked him on January 4, 1577, to continue in the role, he was provided with some younger noblemen to assist him.

Gyllenstierna was also an active participant in privy council meetings. King John made use of his well-known diplomatic skill in disputes with Duke Charles. At the parliamentary session of 1587 in Vadstena, he was among those who brokered the reconciliation between the brothers.When the decision was made for Sigismund to travel to Poland, it is reported "though without solid evidence"that Gyllenstierna opposed the journey. During the prolonged conflict that arose from the Polish royal election, factions formed within the Swedish royal court with John and Charles on one side and Sigismund and the majority of the council on the other. It is said that Gyllenstierna needed "all his tact to navigate between the factions."

As much as he could, he withdrew from politics, sometimes citing his ill health, other times declaring that "the Polish affairs were far beyond his understanding," but he preferred to align himself with the stronger party. Initially, he sided rather closely with John and Charles, which led to distrust from his colleagues in the privy council. Erik Larsson Sparre called him "a fickle man who often was not consistent." Upon Per Brahe the Elder’s death in 1590, John appointed Gyllenstierna to Lord High Steward of Sweden.

=== Under Sigismund III and Charles IX Reign ===
After the death of John III in 1592, he came to Stockholm at Duke Charles’s request and participated in the council’s deliberations. As the Lord High Steward of Sweden, he opened the Uppsala Synod in 1593 with a speech urging those present to uphold the Augsburg Confession. During King John’s reign, Catholics had, for some time, held out hope for his conversion. In 1594, Sigismund confirmed Gyllenstierna’s grants and issued him a new commission as Lawman of Tiohärad and Governor of all Småland. Over time, he drew closer to his fellow council members, but he never fully gained their trust.

After the Riksdag of Söderköping in 1595, in which he participated, Sigismund expressed great dissatisfaction with him, and his relationship with Charles also began to strain. In December 1595, the Duke accused him of having departed from Söderköping’s decisions and stripped him of both his estates and offices, only to soon restore him to favor. However, Gyllenstierna requested "to be relieved of all matters in his old age and time of infirmity." He also signed the council's letter of apology for not being able to attend the Riksdag in Arboga in 1597 but quickly excused himself with the peculiar explanation that he had not had time to read it thoroughly. When Charles later sought his opinion on the Arboga Riksdag, he responded evasively but assured the Duke of his humble service in anything that could benefit the fatherland.

It is certain, however, that he greeted Sigismund's return to Sweden in 1598 with joy. Although he did not openly take Sigismund's side, he supported his sons who were in the king's army. After the king's departure, he even wrote to Charles, stating that if his advice had been followed, much harm could have been avoided. As a result, he received several threatening letters but did not suffer any persecution. Charles soon showed him favor again and often sought his counsel, recognizing that "despite his advanced age and considerable infirmity, there was nothing lacking in his wisdom."
