= Amalia von Hatzfeld =

Swedish countess

Amalia von Hatzfeld.

Amalia von Hatzfeld (1560 – 23 September 1628), was a Swedish countess. She was the governor of Raseborg in 1600–1607.

Amalia von Hatzfeld was born to Vilhelm von Hatzfeld and Sibylla von Rodenhausen. Prior to her marriage, she served as maid of honor to Princess Maria. In 1592, she married count Mauritz Stensson Leijonhufvud. She became the mother of Ebba Mauritzdotter Leijonhufvud. After the death of her spouse in 1600, the crown returned the county of Raseborg in Finland, which had been confiscated from her spouse, to her. She managed it as governor until 1607, when she sold it to the nephew of her late spouse, Sten.
