= Georg Norman =

George Norman (died 1552 or 1553) was a civil servant of German origin who was in Swedish service from 1539.

He was a teacher of Johan III and Erik XIV.

== Biography ==
Norman studied at Rostock University, at Greifswald University and at Wittenberg University under Martin Luther and Philipp Melanchton, where he earned a master's degree. Nils Månsson, who was staying at the university, suggested to Gustav Vasa that Norman should take over the upbringing of his sons Johan and Erik. Upon his arrival, he brought with him letters of recommendation from Melanchthon and Luther. Already after a couple of months, he was given the task of reforming the Church of Sweden.

On December 8, 1539, he was appointed king's "Ordinator and superintendent of bishops, prelates, and all clergymen in religious matters."

In 1540 he undertook an extensive visitation in Östergötland and Västergötland.

In 1542 he was a member of the delegation that concluded Sweden's first treaty with France. He was then sent on a new mission to Denmark and Pomerania . After Conrad von Pyhy fell into disfavor, he was allowed to take over his duties. He was a member of the Riksrådet, served as chancellor and also had diplomatic assignments, among other things he participated in the negotiations with Lübeck in Kalmar in 1546. He handled the foreign correspondence. Most government documents issued during the years 1544-1552 were either written by Norman or written with his participation. He drafted parliamentary bills to the estates and also took care of the finances.
