= Elisabeth Gyllenstierna =

Swedish court official (1581–1646)

Elisabeth Gyllenstierna (1581–1646) was a Swedish court official. She was the överhovmästarinna to Christina, Queen of Sweden, from 1634 until 1639.

She was the daughter of the riksdrots baron Nils Göransson Gyllenstierna af Lundholm and Ebba Bielke af Åkerö. In 1608, she married the admiral and riksråd nobleman Hans Claesson Bielkenstierna (d. 1620). She was appointed head lady in waiting in 1634. During her tenure, she is known to have made use of her position to recommend relatives to offices, and it is noted that she had her daughters Ebba and Karin and her niece Ebba Gyllenstierna to maids-of-honours.

Court offices
Preceded by Ebba Leijonhufvud	Overhovmastarinna to the Queen of Sweden; 1634–1639	Succeeded by Beata Oxenstierna and Ebba Ryning
