= Görwel Gyllenstierna =

Görwel Christina Carlsdotter Gyllenstierna (1646–1708) was a Swedish noblewoman, duellist and landowner.

Görwel was the daughter of Lieutenant Colonel Carl Nilsson Gyllenstierna of Fågelvik and Hässelby (1621–1650) and Sidonia Mannersköld (1620–1656).

She was famous among her contemporaries for her great learning as well as for her interest and skill in sports normally reserved for males. She was referred to as "A Minerva and an Amazon in one" and was a student of not only chemistry, theology, natural science and other subjects but also active within hunting, fencing and other "Knightly practises" rather than "feminine tasks", something which attracted a lot of attention. She made herself widely known when in 1661 she challenged Lieutenant Colonel David Kohl to a duel for marrying her cousin Görwel Nilsdotter Gyllenstierna against the consent of her family.

Görwel Christina married Lieutenant Colonel Leonard Schulman (1644–1677) in 1670. After his death, she managed his estate Leonardsbergs gård during the minority of her son.
