= Great Reduction =

1680 land reforms in Sweden

In the Great Reduction of 1680, by which the ancient landed nobility lost its power base, the Swedish Crown confiscated lands earlier granted to the nobility. Reductions (Swedish: reduktion) in Sweden and its dominions were the return to the crown of fiefs that had been granted to the Swedish nobility. Several reductions are recorded, from the 13th century until this final one of 1680.

== Background ==
The reductions were fought for by gentry, tradesmen, state servants, and peasantry alike, partly as a way to curb the power of the great aristocratic families and partly as a way to make the state solvent and able to pay its debts.

One such reduction, (Swedish: Fjärdepartsräfsten) under Charles X Gustav of Sweden in 1655, intended at restoring a quarter of "donations" made after 1632. However, the outbreak of the Second Northern War prevented its realisation. Only after Charles XI's entry into maturity in 1672 did it begin to be implemented effectively. It soon became obvious that it was not enough to bring public finances into balance.

== Results ==
It is not known exactly how much the Swedish Crown profited from the reductions. The reductions carried out during the reign of Charles XI seem to have resulted in 1,950,000 daler silvermynt in annual rent of which 700,000 were from Sweden and Finland, the core of the Swedish Empire. The dominions in the eastern Baltic and northern Germany yielded approximately 1,150,000 daler silvermynt, of which 550,000 came from Livonia alone.

=== Swedish Crown ===
Financially, the reduction during the reign of Charles XI resulted in a significant increase of the assets of the Swedish Crown. To a high degree, it contributed to the development of the strong and meticulous organization of the realm's finances and government. The reduction also improved the situation of the landowning peasant's estate, especially since many of the recovered fiefs were sold to peasants during the reign of Charles XII. Sometimes the reduction is said to have saved the independence of the peasant estate, but this is not substantiated.

=== Nobility ===
The reduction had an enormous effect on the economy and status of the nobility in Sweden. Since the fiefs that were reduced might have changed owners over the course of many generations, the reduction resulted not only in the loss of the fiefdoms but the cancellation of inheritances from times past, purchases, exchanges, etc. This caused a general insecurity with regards to ownership and creditworthiness among the noble families. Politically, the reduction meant a complete change in the status of the aristocracy. The old land-owning nobility, which through its land ownership had asserted a certain independence even against royal power, lost its power base and was replaced by a rather dependent nobility serving the state in a bureaucratic capacity. The differences between the estates persisted, however, as did the privileges; among these, land still owned by the nobility was taxed at lower rates than land owned by the peasantry.

=== The foreign dominions ===
The reductions had major consequences in the Swedish foreign dominions. They affected both Swedes who had received fiefdoms and were represented in the Swedish riksdag and native landowners in the dominions. The Swedish Crown demanded fiefdoms in the Baltic provinces that had been given before Swedish suzerainty. Some local nobles said that the Swedish Crown thereby ignored the local laws in the dominions.

Especially in Livonia, an old feudal state in which all land since the establishment of the Teutonic Order had been in the hands of the nobility, the demands had profound consequences. Serfs on the reduced fiefdoms were now transferred to the Swedish Crown, which caused dissatisfaction among members of the Baltic German nobility and led, in particular, to Livonian nobleman, Johann Patkul (1660–1707) conspiring with Peter the Great (1672-1725) of Russia and Augustus the Strong of Saxony (1670–1733), to start the Great Northern War against Sweden.

== See also ==
- Counties and baronies in Finland

== Sources ==
- Nyström, J. Fr. (1889). Reduktion. Nordisk familjebok (in Swedish). Vol. 13. Stockholm. pp. 790–795. Archived from the original on 2011-10-16.
- 1558–1710. Estonia under Swedish rule
- Reduktion (in Swedish)
- Nyström, Per (1983). "Ekonomisk frihet och rätt i svensk historia". I folkets tjänst, artiklar i urval (in Swedish). Stockholm.
