= Ebba Sparre =

Swedish lady-in-waiting and noblewoman (1626–1662)

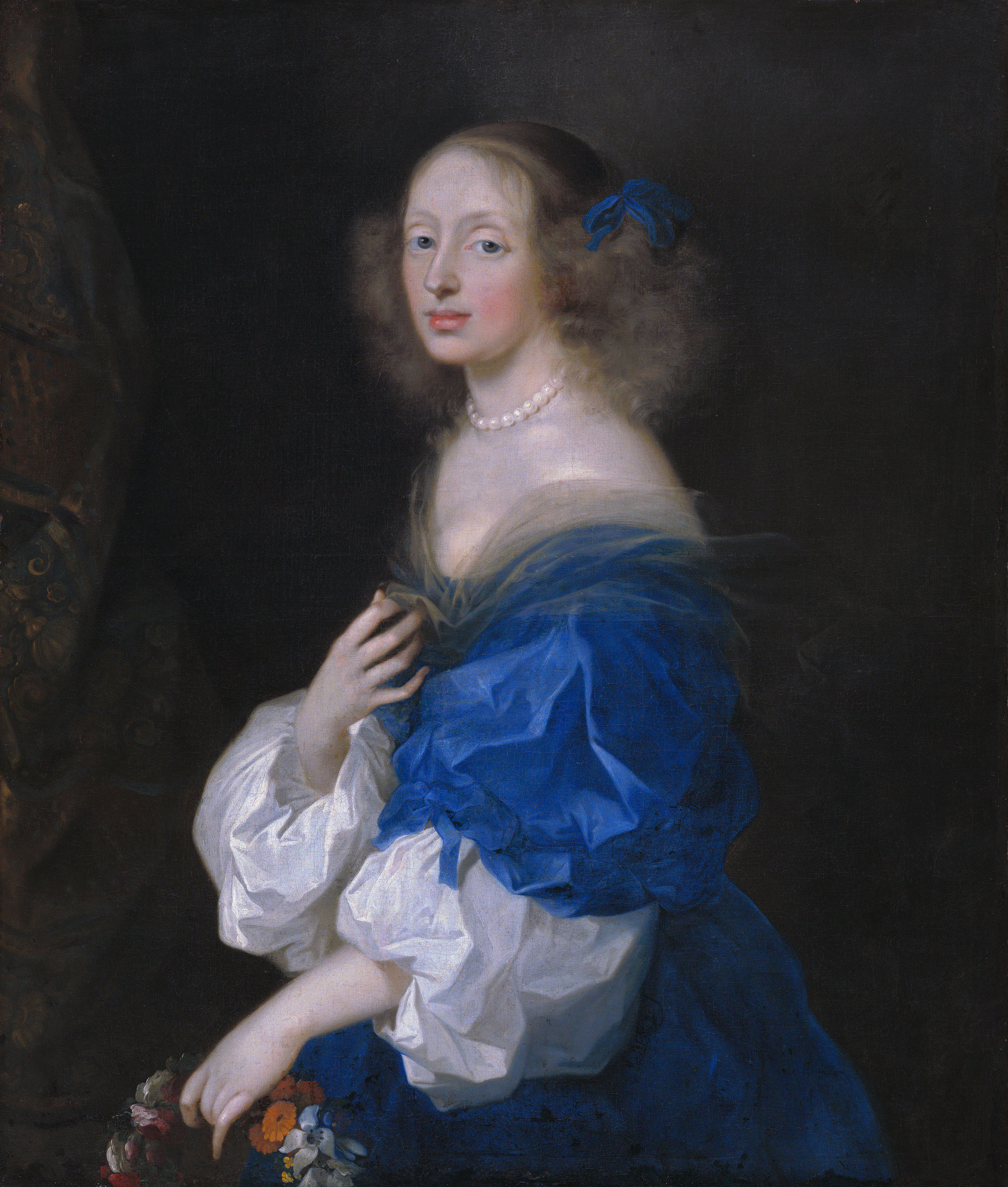
- Portrait by Sébastien Bourdon, c. 1652
- Born: 1626
- Died: 19 March 1662 (aged 35–36); Sweden
- Burial place: Stockholm, Sweden
- Occupation: Lady-in-waiting
- Known for: Proposed lover of Queen Christina
- Title: Countess Sparre
- Spouse: Jakob Kasimir de la Gardie (m. 1653; died 1658)
- Children: 3

Ebba Larsdotter Sparre (1626 – 19 March 1662) was a Swedish lady-in-waiting, noblewoman and favourite of Queen Christina of Sweden. The intimate nature of her relationship with the queen has led to historical interpretations that the two women were lovers.

== Early life ==
Ebba Larsdotter Sparre was born in 1626, the daughter of statesman and marshal Lars Eriksson Sparre and Märta Banér. Her paternal grandfather was Lord High Chancellor (Rikskansler) Erik Larsson Sparre. She had three older brothers, and two younger brothers. The Sparre family was of the lower nobility (lågfrälse) and originated from Västergötland.

== Life at Court ==
Sparre arrived at Queen Christina's court in 1644, and was appointed hovjungfru (maid of honour) to the queen. Ebba and Christina were born in the same year. Ebba was a celebrated beauty at the royal court, gaining the nickname La belle comtesse (French: The beautiful countess), and she soon acquired several suitors.

Sparre frequently played the part of Venus in the amateur ballets performed by the nobility at court.

While at court in 1647, Sparre's father, brothers and uncle were elevated to the rank of friherre (baron).

Further indication of her closeness to the Queen can be found in an anecdote from 1650. Christina was hosting Claudius Salmasius who had taken to bed with a cold. Christina went to visit his bedside, and found he was reading Le Moyen de Parvenir. Christina turned to Sparre and claimed the bawdy book was a prayer book and to read out some passages which quickly became improper causing Christina to laugh and commanded Sparre to read on.

Sparre was present during the English ambassador Bulstrode Whitelocke's diplomatic visit to Sweden (1653-1654). During which Christina introduced her to Whitelocke as her bedfellow, and instructed him to talk with Sparre and judge that her "inside be not as beautiful as her outside." Whitelocke reportedly agreed and praised Sparre's "modesty, virtue, wit..." It is also recorded that Whitelocke gifted Sparre and the other ladies twelve pairs of English gloves.

Sparre was recorded during Italian diplomat Raimondo Montecuccoli's visit to Christina's court in 1654. Christina paired Sparre with Montecuccoli to dance together.

Swedish historian Sven Stolpe claimed that Sparre's surviving letters give the impression of a nervous and insecure disposition, and show no stylistic polish or indication of a higher education.

== Relationship with Queen Christina ==
Ebba's intimate relationship with Queen Christina gave rise to the speculation that they were lovers. This has been widely accepted by historians, who look to Christina's attitude and interactions with Ebba as proof of her sexuality. Christina's sexuality has been interpreted in various ways. According to Montecuccoli, Christina admitted to being in love with Ebba.

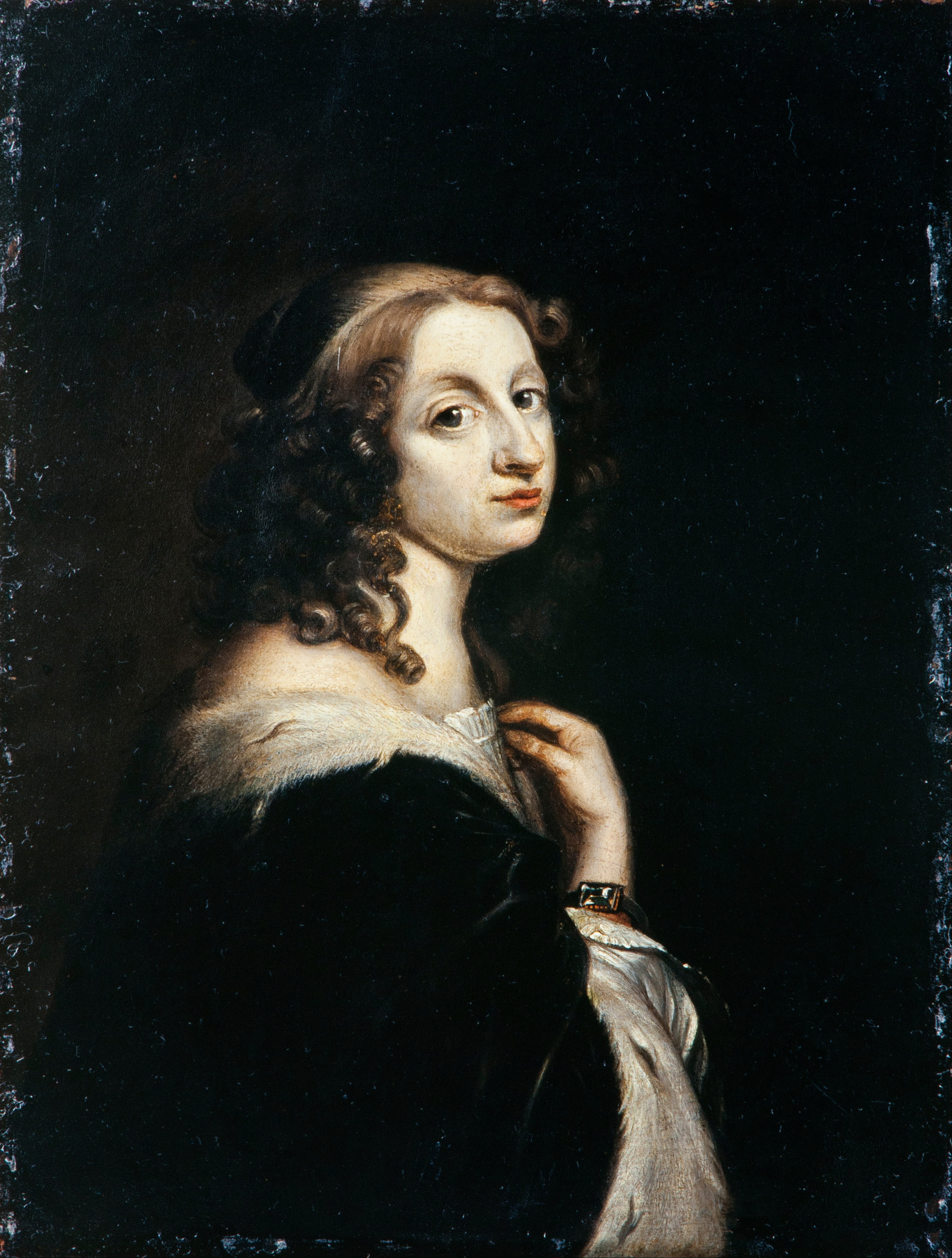
It has been suggested that Ebba was the lover of Christina, Queen of Sweden

However, besides Ebba and a few other ladies of the court, notably Lady Jane Ruthven and Louise van der Nooth, Queen Christina did not show any interest in her female courtiers, and generally mentions them only to express contempt over their femininity and portray herself as more masculine than them. In 1639 she mentions her attitude toward her ladies in waiting in regard to Beata Oxenstierna and her daughter, maid of honor Märta Ulfsparre: "The Mistress of the Robes Lady Beata Oxenstierna and her daughter arrived just now. The more of them that comes here the worse it is".

Gossip about Christina's female relationships existed during her lifetime, though it mainly came from her French enemies, who used accusations of lesbianism and general sexual profligacy to undermine her reputation. As early as 1750, people were forging pornographic letters from Christina to Ebba. A forged volume entitled Lettres Secretes de Christine, Reine de Suede, was published in 1761, containing suggestive letters to Ebba.

Historians have varying interpretations of Christina's sexuality, which has led to different perspectives on Ebba's relationship with her queen. In Christina of Sweden (1930), in which Margaret L. Goldsmith asserts that Christina was a lesbian, Ebba is depicted as a faithless, passive noblewoman with no initiative who opts for a conventional heterosexual marriage. Sarah Waters criticised Goldsmith's biography for cherry picking evidence to suggest a sexual dimension to Christina and Ebba's relationship.

Ebba has been described as Christina's only female friend or only female favourite. Bain states that Ebba was Christina's "exception to her general contempt of women". Sven Stolpe stated that Christina was close with certain women such as her cousin Maria Euphrosyne of Zweibrücken. Christina typically preferred the company of men, "not because they are men, but because they are not women." Ebba was an exception to this, during the later years of Christina's reign. Conversely, Tiernan claims that Ebba was one of many women Christina courted. Nevertheless, Christina was heavily involved with her, and her affection for Ebba was a constant in her turbulent career. Christina was outspoken on her negative views of marriage. Ebba far from agreed with the queen's views, and suffered much from the pretense she had to observe. Ultimately Christina's sexuality, and her exact relationship with Ebba, is unknown.

== Marriage ==
Aged twenty, Ebba was engaged to her maternal cousin Bengt Gabrielsson Oxenstierna. However, the engagement was subsequently broken off. Ebba became engaged to Count Jakob Kasimir de la Gardie (1629–1658), younger brother of the queen's favourite Magnus Gabriel de la Gardie.

Some sources state that Ebba broke her engagement to Bengt due to pressure from Christina, specifically to marry Jacob. Some sources state that this was due to pressure from Christina, who wanted to benefit the De la Gardie family preferably by angering the Oxenstierna family. Stolpe states that this claim is unfounded. According to Nordisk familjebok, Ebba was unwilling to marry Jakob but reluctantly agreed to it. Berg and Stålberg state that Ebba and Jakob sought to marry, and possessed the mutual consent of their parents, but were not able to due to Christina's disapproval.

Ebba and Jakob were engaged on 29 December 1651 at Stockholm Castle. According to Berg and Stålberg, the engagement was not to the queen's liking. She approved the marriage with reluctance. By this point Christina was planning her abdication, and possibly sought to bring Ebba with her overseas.

Ebba and Jakob married in Stockholm on 11 January 1653. The wedding had a splendid "Feast of the Gods" banquet, which later gave rise to the establishment of the Amaranterorden. At Ebba's wedding there were games at the castle, where all the gods and goddesses were guests of shepherds and shepherdesses. Ulfeld was Jupiter, Piementelli was Mars, and the Polish chancellor was Bacchus; the queen and courtiers appeared in shepherd's garb. A month later, Count Magnus Gabriel De la Gardie gave a torchlight ring in honor of the newly married couple, when the brother, Count Jakob, won a prize.

Ebba's relationship with her brother-in-law Magnus Gabriel De la Gardie and her mother-in-law Ebba Brahe appears to have been discordant. The marriage was unhappy. Jakob was shot and killed during the siege of Copenhagen on 7 October 1658. He was buried on 24 July 1658 at Riddarholmen Church. They had three children, who all died at an early age:

- Jacob (1653–1655)
- Cristina (1655–1658)
- Ebba (1657–1657)

== Later life ==
Christina abdicated her throne on 6 June 1654, and left Sweden immediately after. Ebba was upset on Christina's leaving, and subsequently kept in touch with the queen via many letters. Such emotional letters were relatively common at that time, and Christina would also use the same style when writing to women she had never met, but whose writings she admired. From Rome on 6 January 1655, while she was ill, Christina wrote:

How happy I should be if only I could see you, Belle. But I am condemned by Destiny to love and cherish you always without seeing you; and [...] I cannot be completely happy when I am separated from you. Never doubt this fact, and believe that, wherever I may be, I shall always be entirely devoted to you, as I always have been. [...] Good-bye, Beautiful One, good-bye. I embrace you a million times.

Christina wrote to Ebba again on 27 March 1657, after her return from France, pressing her to come and stay with her in Italy.

But whether I am sure if I will never see you, I am sure that I will always love You, and You would be cruel if You doubted this. A friendship that has been tried under three years of absence must not be suspect to you, and if You have not forgotten the favour You have over me, shall You also be reminded that it is already twelve years since I came into possession of the presence of your love. I belong to you in a way that makes it impossible for You to leave me, and it will never happen before the end of life, that I will stop loving You.

In 1661, Christina invited Ebba to visit her in Hamburg. She also wished to see Ebba during her visit to Sweden in 1660, but this was prevented by Ebba's family. It was probably prevented by Magnus Gabriel De la Gardie himself. Another explanation for the missed trip was Ebba's state of health. Ebba became ill for a long time, and she died from fever on 19 March 1662. She was buried in Stockholm on 19 October.

== Cultural depictions ==
French artist Sébastien Bourdon, who was appointed First Painter by Christina, painted a portrait of Ebba in 1652 or 1653. The portrait was probably commissioned by Christina, and was among her goods sent to Rome.

In 1952, literary historian Adolph B. Benson suggested that Ebba was the subject of Skogekär Bergbo's Venerid, a collection of 101 sonnets first published in 1680.

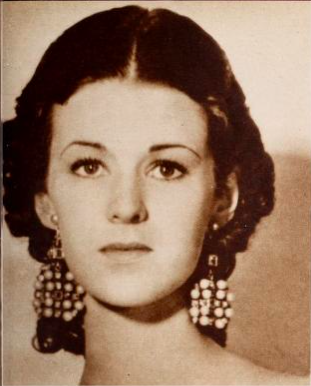
Elizabeth Young as Ebba Sparre in a promotional photo for Queen Christina (1933)

American actress Elizabeth Young portrayed Ebba Sparre in Rouben Mamoulian's 1933 biographical film Queen Christina, which starred Greta Garbo in the title role. The Pre-Code film implies a relationship between Ebba and Christina with a chaste kiss between the two women. Garbo and screenwriter Salka Viertel have been credited with the decision to include this strongly implied relationship between Ebba and Christina in the film. Betsy Erkkila notes that the scene is subtle enough to be missed by the censors, but "nevertheless succeeds in inscribing" Christina's bisexuality. Later in the film, when Ebba's fiance entreats her to ask for the queen's approval to marry, Ebba is shown troubled and fearful of Christina's displeasure. She complains about the queen's "dominating" attitude. Following a scene where Christina falls in love with Spanish ambassador Antonio Pimentel de Prado (John Gilbert), Christina adopts more feminine attire and cheerfully gives Ebba's marriage her blessing.

Ebba Sparre was portrayed by Polish-born actress Ania Marson in the 1974 historical drama film The Abdication. The Abdication depicts Christina professing her love for Ebba, but touches on the concept of a relationship between Christina and Ebba to less an extent than Queen Christina.

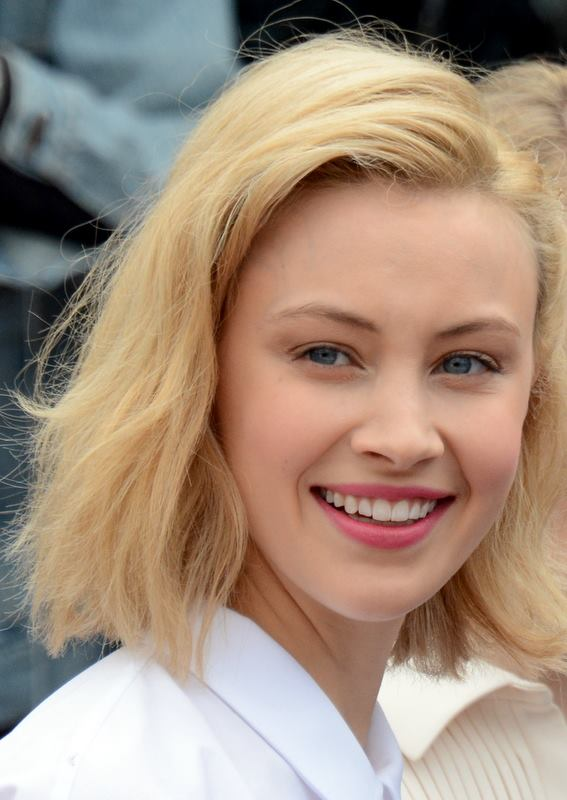
Sarah Gadon portrayed Ebba Sparre in The Girl King (2015).

Canadian playwright Michel Marc Bouchard's 2012 French-language historical play, Christine, la reine-garçon, depicts a romance between Christina and Ebba (originated by Magalie Lépine-Blondeau). The play was adapted into English in 2014; Claire Lautier originated the role in the 2014 English-language production. Bouchard's play was the basis for the screenplay of the 2015 English-language film The Girl King, which focuses on Christina's relationship with Ebba, played by Canadian actress Sarah Gadon. In comparison to Queen Christina, The Girl King decisively portrays Christina as a lesbian, and depicts Ebba and Christina's relationship as unmistakably sexual in nature. Although Gadon's performance was praised, Ebba's characterisation was criticised for being overly demure. The film portrays Christina as a hedonistic monarch who takes advantage of Ebba, as evident by a scene where she passionately seduces Ebba atop the Codex Gigas. In the film, Christina's affection for Ebba is manipulated by Swedish courtiers in a ploy to control the queen. Ebba's marriage to Jakob is arranged against her will, and this hastens Christina's abdication.

In 2015, the Canadian Opera Company and Opéra de Montréal co-commissioned a French-language opera with libretto by Bouchard and music by Julien Bilodeau. The opera, La Reine-Garçon, premiered in Montreal in February 2024. Pasquale Spinney played Ebba in the 2024 production, and Queen Hezumuryango played Ebba in the 2025 production.
