= Louise van der Nooth =

Louise van der Nooth (1630s–1654) was a hovfröken (maid of honour) and favorite of Queen Christina of Sweden.

She was born in the Dutch Republic as the daughter of the colonel Lamoraal van der Noot (died November 1644 in Grave) and Lucretia van Stakenbroek (1609, Grave - 1664, Turku), lords of the heerlijkheid Grave. Her mother remarried the Swedish baron Knut Kurck on 4 March 1646 in Grave and took five of her seven children to Sweden.

Louise van der Nooth was appointed maid of honour to queen Christina. As such, she became a part of the small circle of females in whom Christina showed an interest. With some exceptions, such as Ebba Sparre, Lady Jane Ruthven and Louise van der Nooth, Christina did not show any interest in her female courtiers, and generally mentions them only to express contempt over their femininity and portray herself as more masculine than them. In 1639 she mentions her attitude toward her ladies in waiting in regard to Beata Oxenstierna and her daughter, maid of honor Märta Ulfsparre: "The Mistress of the Robes Lady Beata Oxenstierna and her daughter arrived just now. The more of them that comes here the worse it is". Alongside Lady Jane Ruthven, Louise van der Nooth is described as one of the few ladies-in-waiting apart from Ebba Sparre to have been able to exert any form of influence upon Christina, and was apparently specially appreciated. She belonged to the ladies-in-waiting to remain with Christina until she left Sweden after her abdication in 1654, after the rest of the ladies had lost their positions. Shortly before the abdication, Christina awarded her with a sum of 6.000 daler.

Louise van der Nooth died later the same year.
