= Lady Jane Ruthven =

Lady Jane Ruthven or Lady Jean Ruthven, (died 1668), of noble Scottish descent, was a lady-in-waiting at the court of Queen Christina of Sweden. She served as hovfröken (maid of honour) to the queen.

Ruthven was a daughter of the Scottish general Patrick Ruthven, 1st Earl of Forth, who was in Swedish service from 1609 to 1637, and Jane Henderson. She was also the maternal niece of General John Henderson. Her father and uncle were both in Swedish service, and she kept in contact with the latter after he left Sweden. She had Roman Catholic sympathies through her mother and uncle.

With some exceptions, such as Ebba Sparre, Jane Ruthven and Louise van der Nooth, Queen Christina showed little interest in her female courtiers, and mentions them only to express contempt over their femininity and portray herself as more masculine than them. In 1639 she mentions her attitude toward her ladies in waiting in regard to Beata Oxenstierna and her daughter, maid of honor Märta Ulfsparre: "The Mistress of the Robes Lady Beata Oxenstierna and her daughter arrived just now. The more of them that comes here the worse it is".

Ruthven belonged to a small circle of female favorites. It is known that the English ambassador Bulstrode Whitelocke cultivated her company because of her influence at the Swedish court.

Before July 1661, she married James Forrester, 2nd Lord Forrester of Corstorphine.
