= Hedvig Taube =

Swedish courtier and countess (1714–1744)

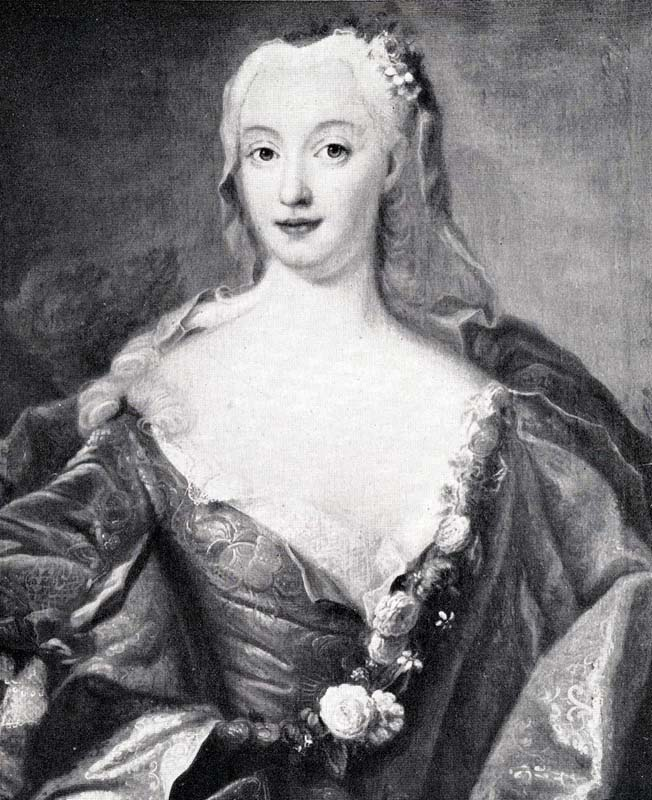
Hedvig Taube by Lorens Pasch.

Hedvig Ulrika Taube (31 October 1714 – 11 February 1744), also Countess von Hessenstein, was a Swedish courtier and countess, a countess of the Holy Roman Empire, and royal mistress to king Frederick I of Sweden from 1731 to 1744. She and Sophie Hagman are the only two official royal mistresses in Swedish history.

== Early life ==
Hedvig Taube was one of nine children of Count Edvard Didrik Taube (1681–1751) and Christina Maria Falkenberg (1686–1753). Her sister, Catherine Charlotte, was to marry the brother of scientist Countess Eva Ekeblad, who was also the aunt of the renowned Axel von Fersen the Younger. In 1716, the future king Frederick became one of the godparents to her sister Christina Beata. During the 1720s, her father was nearly ruined and placed in heavy debt because of gambling and bad business: in 1730, the family had been forced to change their city residence to a cheaper one.

Hedvig Taube was described as a beauty, and in 1730, the king noticed her, likely on a visit to baron Otto Reinhold Strömfelt, who was married to her paternal aunt. He started to court her with baskets of fruit and flowers sent to the home of her indebted father: reportedly, jewels and other valuable items were hidden beneath the fruit. He also inquired whether Arvid Horn would be willing to house her, so as to make it possible for the king to court her in person. Horn refused, and during the Riksdag of 1731, he warned the king that he was the topic of dislike in the Clergy estate for courting a young unmarried lady.

The king's favorite and confidant, Erland Broman, convinced her father to agree to a sexual relationship between his daughter and the king. Hedvig Taube herself, however, was engaged to a young count Erik Sparre and refused, supported by her mother. Her mother suggested to take Hedvig Taube with her to their country estate Kungshatt to avoid the king's attention, but her spouse: "sold his daughter to the king for quite a sizable sum. His debts were paid and promotions made for his sons and his relations", and he sent his wife alone to the country and kept his daughter with him in the capital. Her betrothed, Erik Sparre, was also removed, as he was included to be a part of the entourage accompanied the king to his visit to Hesse, and several people were sent to Hedvig Taube to convince her to agree to the king's advances upon his return, notably her father's maiden aunt Beata Taube and Carl Tersmeden, calling her future fate more beautiful than she could imagine. She was convinced by being pressed by her duty to her family, and the custom of maîtresse-en-titre in France, which was not seen as improper there and would be introduced in Sweden with her. Meanwhile, her mother was convinced to agree to the matter by Eleonora Lindhielm and Hedvig Catharina Lillie, married to Daniel Niklas von Höpken and Magnus Julius De la Gardie, who wished to benefit their political careers by supporting the king.

In the company of her mother and aunt, Hedvig Taube was brought to the king at Karlberg Palace upon his return from Hesse 12 November 1731. Shortly thereafter, she was appointed hovfröken (maid of honour), to queen Ulrika Eleonora to become accessible to the king at court and, though it was not spoken aloud, to become his mistress. When the carriage came to take her to court, Tersmeden reported her saying; My fate is harder than I could imagine. I am being forced to expose my virtue to save a family ruined by gambling. Her father was appointed riksråd, and others who had participated in the affair in the king's favor were rewarded.

== Maid of honor ==
During her tenure as maid of honor at court, her position as mistress to the king was kept secret. Initially, the relationship was kept a secret from the queen by her favorite and confidant Emerentia von Düben. The queen did not consider it proper to expose the monarch to slander in public, and participated in protecting the king's reputation. During the hunting trip to Dalarna, which the royal court undertook in 1732 to celebrate the visit of the king's brother Prince William of Hesse, the queen demonstrated her disregard to the rumors by displaying affection to her maid of honor Hedvig Taube, when they were seen by the public during walks.

At this point, she was regarded at court as a temporary amusement. She was referred to as la belle Colombe by the king, who gave her gifts financed by his income from Hesse. In the winter of 1733–34, Taube was pregnant with her first child. The affair was kept a secret: Taube retired to her room simulating bedridden illness as soon as the pregnancy could not be hidden, and before the birth was due, in February 1734 the king convinced the queen to take the royal court to Ulriksdal Palace, and Taube was left alone to give birth in the royal palace in Stockholm. The child, a daughter known as "Mamsell Erlich", was left to a foster mother, but died soon after. Hedvig Taube avoided official discovery, but the birth was subject of widespread gossip in the capital.

Hedvig Taube was supported by her family, as well as the politicians Daniel Niklas von Höpken, Karl Gyllenborg and Hans Reinhold von Fersen and their followers, and on their request, she made recommendations of candidates to political offices to the king, something which created rising discontent. She did, however, not display any personal interest in state affairs. The French envoy in Sweden, Charles Louis de Biaudos de Casteja, was known to recognize the participation of women in the Swedish party strife of the Age of Liberty and confirmed to have recruited several female agents for French interests in Sweden, such as Charlotta von Liewen and Margareta Gyllenstierna, attempted to recruit the king's mistress Hedvig Taube for 100.000 livres, but she refused and expressed no interest to be involved in state affairs.

== Royal mistress ==
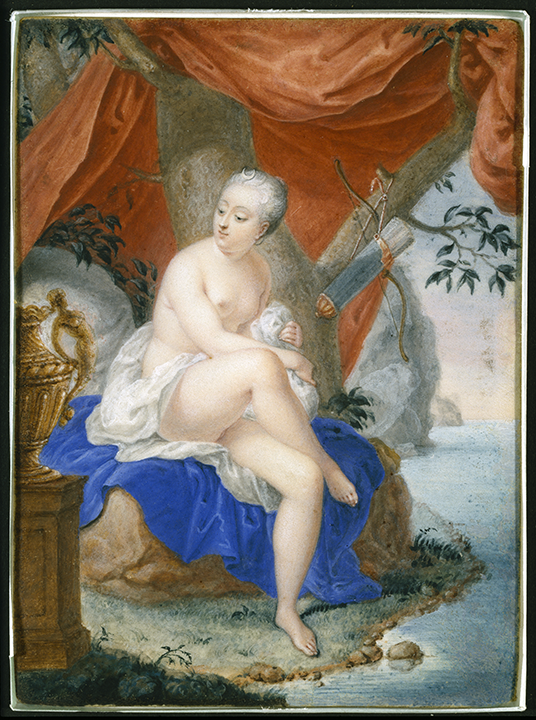
Hedvig Ulrica Taube (1714–44) as Diana by Gustaf Torshell

In late 1734, Hedvig Taube conceived again, and this time, she left her position at court and was installed at a private residence the king had arranged for her close to the royal residence of Wrangel Palace awaiting her delivery, where he regularly visited her by litter. On 17 March 1735, she gave birth to a son by the king in her residence, the child was then given the king's brother William of Hesse as his godson and promised the title count of Hesse. Hedvig Taube was given an allowance of 12,000 dlr from the estate of Hesse, where the king ruled in the province of Landgrave. All of this exposed the relationship between the king and Hedvig Taube to the public and both were unable to conceal it any longer. She became the first acknowledged royal mistress in Sweden, which resulted in a public scandal. After her public acknowledgement and first appearance at court in 1735, the queen protested by claiming to be indisposed and refused to leave her room. After this snub, Taube never appeared at court again.

Public opinion favored the queen, who enjoyed great popularity for her personal piety and for being the only remaining member of the old Swedish dynasty. The queen herself, however, refused to display public displeasure, as this opposed her view on royal dignity. She did confess her displeasure in private to her confidante Emerentia von Düben, who, however, stated that it would be undignified for Ulrika Eleonora to notice this affair, and that her position as queen was untouchable: "As the moon continue its course over the sky with no care for the barks of dogs, so should Her Majesty despise the gossip, which has been unleashed by this so unfortunate and blind commitment."

After the birth, the king referred to Hedvig Taube more respectfully as la Comtesse Taube rather than la belle Colombe. The scandal initially ostracized Hedvig Taube from society, but her isolation was broken when a group of female members of the nobility, Sarah Derith (spouse of Carl Gyllenborg), Eleonora Magdalena Wachtmeister and Eleonora Lindheim (spouse of Daniel Niklas von Höpken) paid her an official visit to ask the monarch through Taube to benefit the career of their spouses, which discontinued the ostracism and initiated her career as intermediary to the king. After this Hedvig Taube hosted her own receptions in her residence, sometimes alone, and sometimes in the company of the king, and were courted by artists and supplicants. She acted as the patron of artists, the most noted one being Olof von Dahlin, who has been referred to as her court poet. According to contemporaries, Hedvig Taube had "power over the king's mind", and "the use she made of it eventually came to have rather significant consequences in both interior- and foreign policy". However, her influence was normally used not to promote an agenda of any kind, but to make recommendations of candidates to various positions to the king, something which was successfully used by her father. Her salon became a center for the Hats (party), who opposed the Caps (party) government under Arvid Horn and sought to influence the king through her after the Riksdag of 1734 until the Riksdag of 1738. She herself, however, was reportedly not in opposition to Horn.

=== Riksdag of 1738–39 ===
The Riksdag of 1738–39 signified a crisis for Hedvig Taube. Frustrated at her refusal to be recruited as an agent and influence the monarch in favor of the French-supported Hats, the Hats party under Carl Gyllenborg withdrew their support to her appending the Riksdag of 1738. Already in the inauguration of the Swedish language theater at Bollhuset the previous year, Gylleborg's play Svenska sprätthöken had criticized the king and government, and prior to the Riksdag of 1738, the leading Hat party sympathizer, the salon hostess Hedvig Catharina Lillie arranged a play in her private theater in honor to the birth day of the king, were the relationship of the king and Taube were caricatured, an incident that affected opinion in favor of the Hats party in the following election, as they had positioned themselves against the adultery of the monarch. Numerous pamphlets and propaganda circulated condemning the adultery of the king and the Caps government in the name of the Hat party, and Carl Gyllenborg himself wrote an anonymous letter of complaint to the archbishop Jöns Steuchius accusing him of neglecting his duty, signed "Lisa Husbonde" (Lisa the Master of the House). All this stirred public opinion, and Hedvig Taube reportedly used bribes in an attempt to prevent the matter from being raised in parliament.

During the Riksdag of 1738–39, the father of Hedvig Taube was deposed as riksråd after Sten Coyet had raised the question of the relationship between his daughter and the king. The question of the king's adultery with Hedvig Taube was finally raised in the Riksdag by Fryxell, a member of the clergy estate. The archbishop had already had a private conversation with the queen about he matter, during which the queen had lamented herself over the king's adultery and her disappointment of the Taube family. The clergy estate pointed to the oath made by the king in 1720, when he succeeded the queen on the Swedish throne after she abdicated in his favor, in which he had made the promise to: "love, honor and respect my most worthy consort, the all powerful Princess Ulrica Eleonora [...] and declare the Estates to be free of their oath of allegiance, should I ever break this oath and insurance", in fact declaring the king deposed if he disrespected the queen.

A delegation was made of bishop Erik Benzelius the Younger and superintendent Aurvillius. On 2 April 1739, the delegation interrogated the confessor of the royal court, Stiernman, who denied having performed any secret marriage ceremony between the king and Taube, denied being aware of any illegitimate children of hers and refused to reveal anything said under confession. On 3 April, the delegation visited the king. Frederick I stated that he could not undo what was done; that he was not the only man with illegitimate children; that Bishop Benzelius was not the right person to throw the first stone, referring to the scandals surrounding the bishop's daughter Greta Benzelia; that he would defend Taube against anyone and that his sin with Taube was a matter between himself and God and that his oath as king did not concern his private life.

On 26 April, the king expressed a wish to leave for Hesse. He was rumored to plan to settle there permanently with Taube. A rumor circulated of a planned coup d'état by the queen's followers. The plan was to have the king leave with Taube, leaving the queen as regent of Sweden in his absence. After his departure, the queen's followers would present her with proof that the king had secretly married Taube, expecting the queen to respond by considering her marriage dissolved and agree to be reinstated as monarch. This planned coup never took place; the king never presented a request to leave for Hesse. In parallel, however, great estates was bought in Holstein through Erland Broman and with Hessian money: Panker, Todendorf, Clamp, Hohenfelde, Vogelsdorf and Schmoll, for the sons of Hedvig Taube.

The Riksdag of 1738–39 ended with a new government of the Hats party. The Hat government was allied with France against Russia. They reportedly also used the matter of Hedvig Taube as a tool to control the king. When the king's brother William of Hesse married a British princess, the king accepted British money to Hesse, in his capacity as Landgrave of Hesse. This resulted in a crisis between the king and the Hats government, who saw the alliance between Sweden ad France undermined and discredited by the alliance between Great Britain and Hesse, as Hesse and Sweden was at the time united by a personal union. This crisis was used by the British-supported Caps party, who believed that they would be given the king's support, if only Taube, the Hats pressure tool, was removed.

The king's brother William of Hesse, regent of Hesse in his absence and heir to the throne of Hesse, were also in strong opposition to Taube, due to her allowance was taken from the Hessian state and because of his fear that the king would marry her in the future and make her sons heirs to the Hessian throne, and through his envoy in Sweden, he pressured his brother to get rid of Taube. In the summer of 1740, the sons of Taube were sent to their estates in Holstein, and some time after, she left to join them, after having been threatened by the Hessian president Danckelmann with loss of her Hessian allowance, despite the Hat party's attempts to make her stay. However, she stopped halfway and stayed at the estate Östermalma near Nyköping with her brother-in-law count Wolter Reinhold Stackelberg.

=== Riksdag of 1740–41 ===
During the following Riksdag of 1740–41, an opportunity aroused for the Hat government to declare war against Russia, in which they sought the king's support. Despite the queen's opposition to the war, the king gave his consent, thereafter being given support from the Hats party to resume his relationship with Taube. He then left for Nyköping, officially on a hunting trip, where he resumed his relationship with Hedvig Taube and presented her with a document from the Holy Roman Emperor (during the interregnum represented by the Elector of Saxony), granting her sons the titles Imperial counts of Hessenstein. Hedvig Taube returned to the capital, though to avoid provocations, she initially stayed in a rented cottage in the Söder area outside the city.

The Riksdag of 1740–41 resulted in a new crisis for Hedvig Taube. At this point, a change had occurred in the queen's attitude, signs which was observed already during the Riksdag of 1738. Despite demonstrating her compassion with the other riksråd deposed during the riksdag, she smiled when the misfortune of the father of Hedvig Taube was mentioned. When hosting the wedding of her maid of honor Sigrid Bonde at court, she neglected to invite the Taube, Gylleborg and Sparre families (the last two known to support Hedvig Taube), despite court protocol which would have expected them to be included, and when the new riksråd Carl Sparre, a known support of Taube, was presented to her during the audience for the new members of government, she demonstratively retired, preventing him from kissing her skirt in accordance with protocol. The Queen was jealous and felt her pride was hurt. Another reason to her change of conduct was reportedly that she, as an orthodox Lutheran, was concerned for the king's soul because of his adultery. The return of Hedvig Taube after her temporary exile was apparently the last straw, and she reacted to it by retiring to bed and refused to show herself in public for some time.

The discontent of queen Ulrika Eleonora was not a small matter for the Riksdag: not only due to the queen's popularity, but also because the queen had abdicated in favor of the king on the condition that she would succeed him if he (being twelve years older) should die before her, a condition which did in fact make the queen the king's heir to the throne, and during the Riksdag of 1741, when the queen stayed with her court at her summer residence Karlberg Palace, the matter of the king's adultery was, for the second time raised in parliament by the Clergy estate, this time by Bishop Erik Benzelius, who referred to the matter as that "which the Queen had made it known" that they should raise, to "set the mourning heart of the Queen to rest". An official statement of protest was made, stating a reminder of the king's oath always to treat the queen with respect when she abdicated in his favor, and that the whole Kingdom was in mourning of the queen's sorrow, and concerned for the welfare of the king's soul. Two delegations from the Clergy estate were appointed: one to the king, and one to Hedvig Taube.

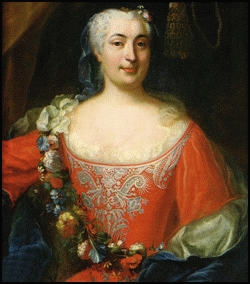
Hedvig Taube by Martin van Meytens.

In July 1741, the statement was read to the king in his audience chamber. The king reacted with rage, refused to accept the statement and stated that the Riksdag of the Estates had promised him not to interfere in his private life. He was, on their second attempt, forced to receive the statement. When Bishop Schröder reported the result of the audience with the king to the queen, Ulrika Eleonora insisted that the planned embassy to Hedvig Taube was also to be executed according to plan, and replied to the hesitation of the bishop with the words: "When You priests follow your calling and your conscience, you do well to do so with no concern of other matters."

When the delegation arrived to Hedvig Taube early that morning, she excused herself claiming to be bedridden and ill, but the priests then entered her bedroom, and she was forced to receive them lying in bed. She told them that she could not see why the Riksdag of the Estates should have an interest for her, as she never involved in politics, but was met with the reply that their business was in the welfare of the soul of the king and herself. She covered her face with a sheet and answered crying: "It would have been well, if this had been prevented twelve years ago, when I was too young to protect myself". The delegation expressed sympathy with the fact that she had been led to sin, but that she should not continue with it now that she had been made aware of it, and leave the capital: "Your Ladyship should consider, how greatly she displeases the most honorable Queen of us all, who laments herself because of it, to the point of shortening her life span out of grief, to great damage of our fatherland." Upon this, she answered: "I have never been led to see, that Her Majesty has been ungracious or displeased in this matter" and was given the reply: "We can assure Your ladyship that it is so, and how else could it be?" The delegation then read the statement, "Her ladyship should consider, that she with her conduct for so long has broken her duty as her subject to her royal majesty, her gracious sovereign as well as that of us all", and left the document with her. Hedvig Taube, however, returned to her former position and her residence in the capital as soon as the Riksdag of 1741 was dissolved.

== Later life ==
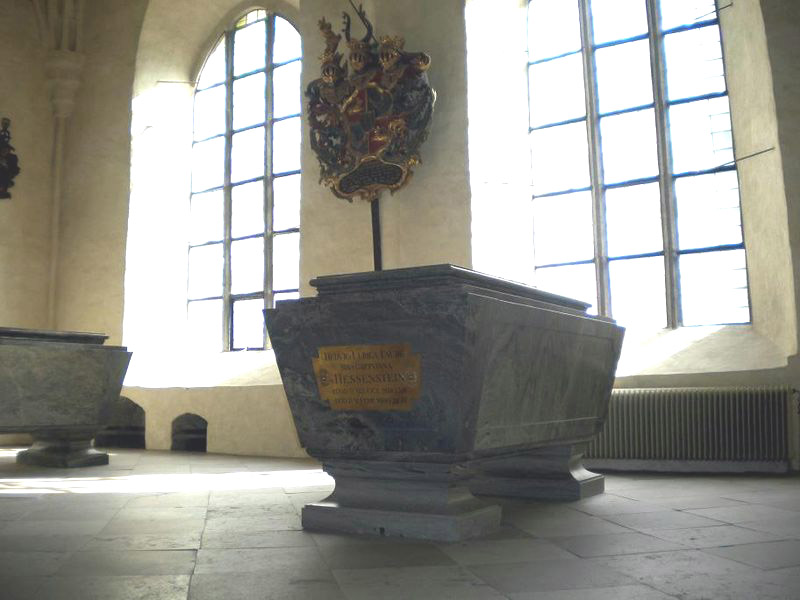
Hedwig Taube von Hessenstein's grave at Strängnäs Cathedral

In accordance with the abdication document of 1720, where the queen abdicated in favor of the king on condition that she succeed him if he should die before her, the queen had in effect been the heir to the throne of Sweden. Upon her death in November 1741, the question of succession to the Swedish throne was raised. Hedvig Taube, who was well aware that her exile was due to the efforts of the British- and Hessian supported Capts party, was expected to support the French-supported Hats party. The French ambassador to Sweden, Marc Antoine Front de Beaupoil, marquis de Lanmary, courted her and presented her with a set of golden tableware and her sons appointed French colonels to secure her support of the French candidate in the election of an heir to the Swedish throne: Christian IV, Count Palatine of Zweibrücken. It was during this period, that Taube reportedly had hopes to marry the king and have her own sons becoming heir to the throne. When she lost hopes of this, she accepted to support the French candidate. On 29 March 1742 her sons were made Swedish counts, and 2 February 1743 she was made Holy Roman Countess of Hessenstein.

During the Dalecarlian Rebellion (1743), when the rebellious peasants marched to the capital in support of the Danish candidate and protest toward the Hats government, she, as well as Fredrik Gyllenborg, Carl Gustaf Tessin, Anders von Höpken and many other figures of the Hats party left the city fearing for their safety. In 1743, the Russian candidate Adolf Frederick of Holstein-Gottorp was elected heir to the throne. In December, the crown prince was brought to her in secret during the night in company only with the king, a courtier and Erland Broman, and unofficially introduced to her while she lay confined to her bed in pregnancy. During the visit, she begged to crown prince for protection of her and her children. After the visit, the crown prince remarked, that he understood the king's affection, and that he would never have thought Hedvig Taube to be so beautiful and charming.

Hedvig Taube died due to childbirth. Her last pregnancy was very difficult, and during it, she was overheard cursing her father and Erland Broman, throwing the king's gifts around, and told her confessor that it would be the fault of the king if she should come to hell and that he would also be placed there if he did not better himself. According to reports, the king had plans to marry Hedvig Taube as a widower, but the plans were never realized due to her death.

In 1745, Taube was replaced as an official royal mistress by the Catharina Ebba Horn.

== Issue ==
1. Mamsell Ehrlich (1 March 1734 – died shortly after), posthumously known as Fredrika Vilhelmina von Hessenstein.
2. Prince Fredrik Vilhelm von Hessenstein (17 March 1735 – 27 July 1808).
3. Count Karl Edvard von Hessenstein (26 November 1737 – 17 April 1769).
4. Countess Hedvig Amalia von Hessenstein (2 February 1744 – 6 May 1752).

== Bibliography ==
- Admiral Tersmedens memoarer (The memoires of Admiral Tersemeden) (Swedish)
- Åke Ohlmarks: Svenska krönikan (Swedish Chronicle) (Swedish)
- 372 (Anteckningar om svenska qvinnor) Wilhelmina Stålberg: Anteqningar om svenska qvinnor (Notes on Swedish women) (Swedish)
- "Hedvig Ulrika Taube". (In Swedish)
