= Sarah Derith =

Politically active Swedish countess and salon holder

Sarah Derith, née Wright (1680-1745), was a politically active Swedish (originally British) countess and salon holder, married to the Swedish politician count Carl Gyllenborg.

She was the daughter of John Wright, esq; attorney-general of Jamaica, and married first to Elias Deritt. She was known as a Tory Sympathiser. In 1710, she married the Swedish diplomat Carl Gyllenborg, at the time posted in London. She was at the time a wealthy widow with a salon that gathered a large net of influential people in from the political, cultural, scientific and merchant world. After their marriage, her spouse also used her salon to benefit Swedish interests in Great Britain by creating a pro-Swedish attitude with the British politicians attending her salon. Sarah Wright was a jacobite, and worked for reinstating the Stuart dynasty on the British throne. Carl Gyllenborg was implicated in an attempted coup planned by Wright, placed in house arrest and expelled: his part in the affair is unknown. After his return to Sweden, he financed his political career with his spouse's money.

Sarah Wright participated in the political life also in Sweden, and are mentioned alongside Hedvig Catharina Lillie as examples of the politically active women in Sweden during the Age of Liberty. In 1734, when the sexual relationship between Hedvig Taube and King Frederick I of Sweden was publicly recognised after the birth of a son, Taube was initially socially boycotted when the female members of the aristocracy refused to pay her visits. Sarah Wright belonged to the three noblewomen who broke this boycott by visiting Taube in the company of her husband, Eleonora Magdalena Wachtmeister and Eleonora Lindheim. During the visit, they asked for favours from the monarch through Taube, which broke the boycott and started the political position of Taube as an intermediary.
