= Juliana Schierberg =

Juliana Sophia Schierberg, known as Julianchen (died 1712) was a Swedish favorite. She was the personal chamber maid and influential confidante of Princess Hedvig Sophia of Sweden and known for her influence and political activity.

Juliana Schierberg was employed as a chamber maid to Queen Ulrika Eleonora in 1681, and was given the same position to the eldest Princess, Hedvig Sophia, upon the death of the queen in 1693. She had a similar position with Hedvig Sophia as Emerentia von Düben had with the younger Princess, Ulrika Eleonora of Sweden, and acted as the political adviser of the Princess.

Various foreign diplomats contributed the fact that the marriage alliance between Denmark and Sweden, which was to take place with a marriage between Hedvig Sophia and Prince Charles of Denmark and Charles XII of Sweden and Princess Sophia Hedwig of Denmark, did not take place, was because of her influence, as was that the fact Hedvig Sophia did not marry William III of England but the Duke of Holstein in 1698.

In 1702, she played the same important part in the marriage negotiations regarding the expected new marriage of Hedvig Sophia after her widowhood. Juliana Schierberg reportedly accepted bribes and had a net of spies to work for the benefit of the Princess, and influential people unsuccessfully tried to have her removed from court because of her influence. In 1708, a party consisting of Fritze, a favorite servant of Hedvig Sophia, and the two ladies-in-waiting Maria Horn and Charlotta von Liewen tried to have her removed from court by saying to the Princess that Schierberg had become senile, but as Schierberg as a chamber maid slept in the same room as the Princess and had access to her all the time this did not succeed.

In 1708, Hedvig Sophia died of smallpox. Gossip accused Schierberg to have caused her death by exposing her to superstitious medical treatments and letting no one in to the sickbed of the Princess except Maria Horn, neither the överhovmästarinna Märta Berendes nor the doctor. Juliana Schierberg retired with a fortune after the death of Hedvig Sophia, which is proven by the fact that she was able to donate a great sum to finance the Great Nordic War in 1710.
