= Joachim von Düben the Elder =

Swedish politician (1671–1730)

- Born: 22 August 1671; Stockholm, Sweden
- Died: 30 November 1730 (aged 59); Stockholm, Sweden
- Noble family: Düben family
- Spouse: Margareta Spegel
- Issue: Ulrika Eleonora
- Father: Gustaf Düben
- Mother: Emerentia Standaert

Joachim von Düben the Elder (Swedish: Joachim von Düben den äldre; 22 August 1671 – 30 November 1730) was a Swedish statesman, riksråd and hovkansler.

== Early life ==
Joachim von Düben was the son of organist and composer Gustaf Düben and Emerentia Standaert, he was a grandson of the German-born Baroque composer Andreas Düben, and brother of lady-in-waiting Emerentia, Gustaf and Anders von Düben the Younger.

== Political career ==
In 1709, Düben was captured near the Dnieper and held as a hostage in Moscow.

Düben anonymously published Uthwalde andelige sånger in 1725.

== Family ==
In 1719, Düben married Margareta Spegel, a daughter of Archbishop Haquin Spegel. He was in 1731, posthumously promoted, raised to comital rang.

== Sources ==
- Anrep, Gabriel (1858). Svenska adelns ättar-taflor (in Swedish). P. A. Norstedt u. Söhne.
- Hildebrand, Bengt (1945). "Düben, Düben von, släkt" (in Swedish). National Archives of Sweden. p. 634.
