= Östra Vemmerlöv Church =

Coordinates: 55°34′45″N 14°14′06″E

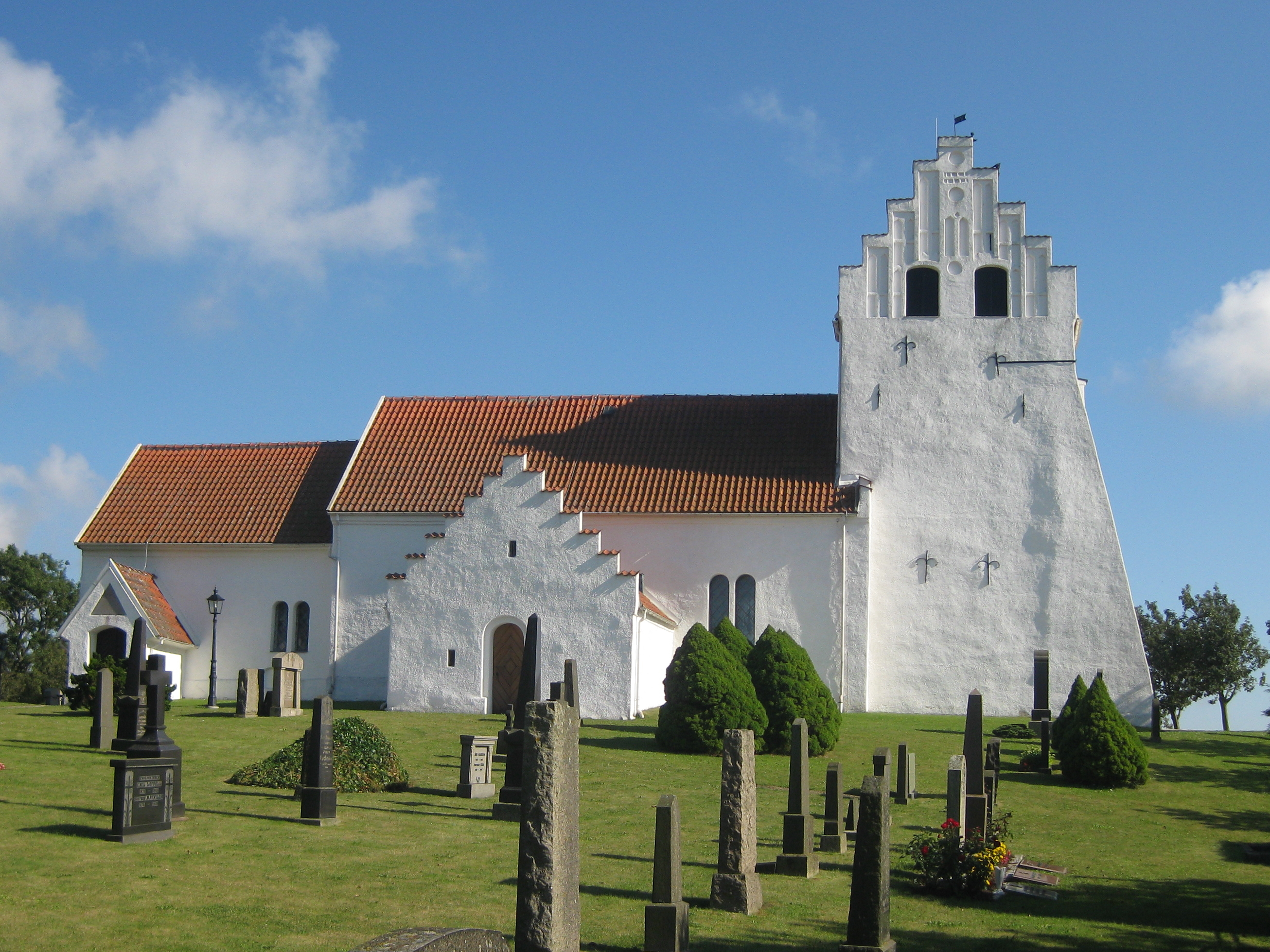
Östra Vemmerlöv Church, view of the exterior

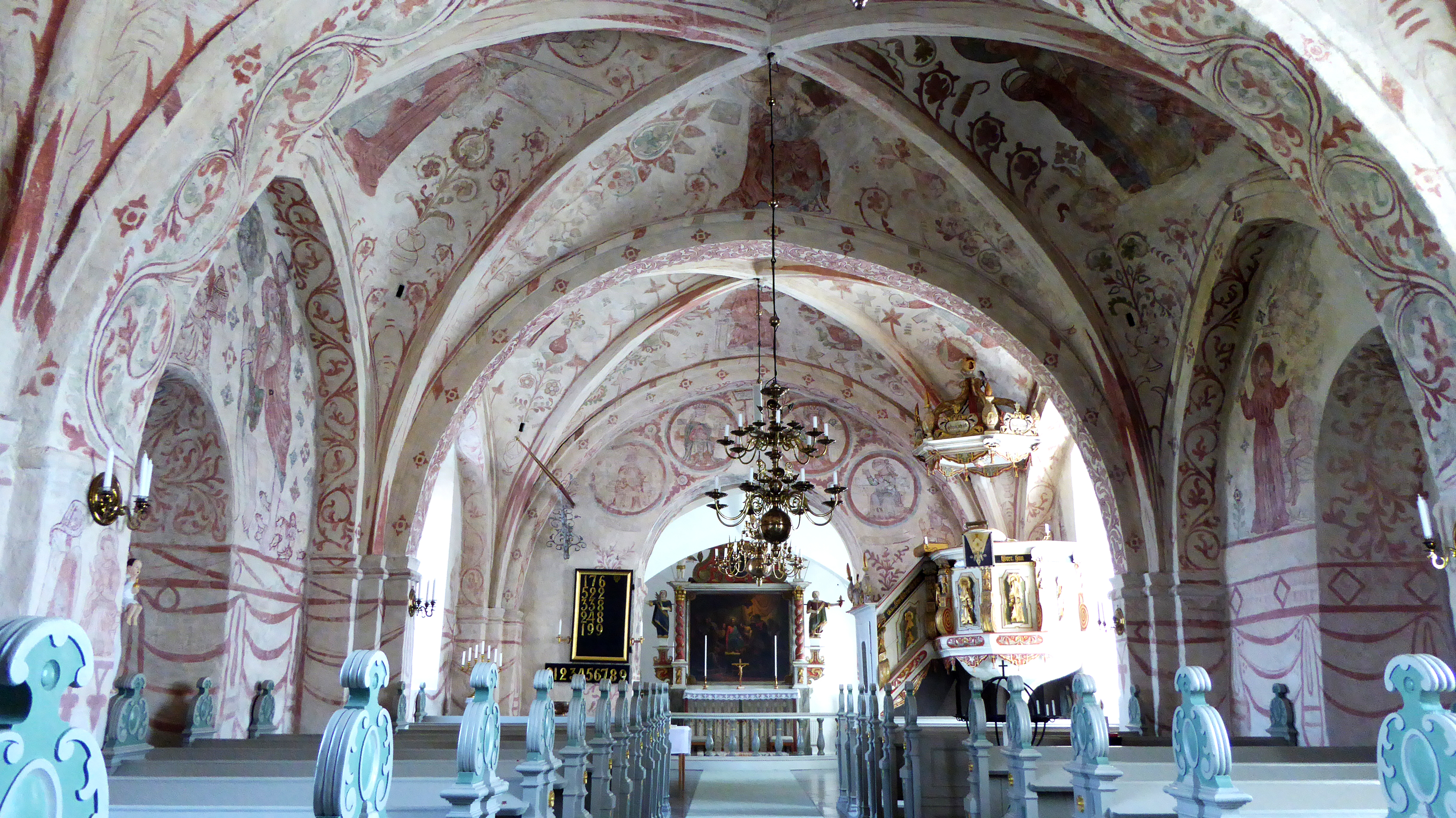
Interior view towards the choir, showing the decorated vaults

Östra Vemmerlöv Church (Swedish: Östra Vemmerlövs kyrka) is a medieval church in Östra Vemmerlöv, in the province of Skåne, Sweden. It belongs to the Diocese of Lund. It contains many medieval mural paintings.

== History ==
Construction of the church began in the 12th century with the nave and choir, and it has been successively enlarged during the Middle Ages and beyond. The nave was expanded towards the west during the 13th century, and the tower was constructed during the 14th century. During the 15th century, the two church porches with their crow-stepped gables were added to the church and the interior remade; the presently visible decorated brick vaults date from this time. The choir was enlarged during the 17th century, and contains the burial chamber of several different families who have owned nearby Gyllebo Manor since that time. It was enlarged in 1787. A major renovation was carried out in 1962.

== Murals ==
The church contains many medieval murals dating from the late 15th century. They are considered to be of high quality and probably made by the same workshop or artist that made similar murals in Fjälkinge Church and Vallby Church. They were discovered some time before 1907, when the church was visited by the architect tied to Lund Cathedral, Theodor Wåhlin. Wåhlin discovered that the paintings, which had been covered over with whitewash, had been laid bare and that some attempts at restoring them had been made by a local painter.

The murals mainly, but not exclusively, depict religious subjects. The paintings on the westernmost bay of the nave displays the story of the Last Judgment, while the rest of the nave shows depictions of saints; among these the three Nordic royal saints Olaf, Canute and Eric. On and close to the wall separating the choir from the nave are a number of depictions of prophets as well as Christ and Mary, while the side facing the choir depicts the fall of man.

== Furnishings ==
The Romanesque baptismal font belonging to the church is from the 12th century, and is the only surviving medieval item in the church. The altarpiece is from the 1760s but displays an oil painting from the 19th century, and the pulpit dates from 1762. The church also contains a special pew made for the local lord in 1641 and decorated with sculptures depicting Moses, John the Baptist and coat of arms. The other pews is later, probably made in 1907. The church also is in possession of a cavalry flag from the 17th century, displaying the monogram of the Danish king Christian IV; it was given to the church by the lords of Gyllebo Manor.
