= Hedvig Catharina De la Gardie (1695–1745) =

Swedish countess

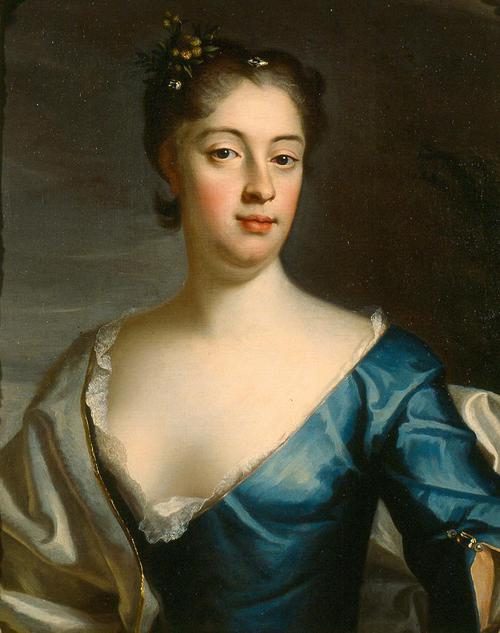
- Born: Hedvig Catharina Lillie; 1695; Sweden
- Died: 1745 (aged 49–50); Paris, France
- Other name: Hedvig Catharina Lillie
- Occupation: noblewoman
- Known for: Political Salon

Hedvig Catharina De la Gardie, née Lillie (1695–1745), was a Swedish countess, notable for her salon and political activity. She was a known political figure during the party strife of the Age of Liberty, and used her influence in favor of the Hats Party and its ally, France. She was the grandmother of Count Axel von Fersen the Younger.

== Early life ==
Hedvig Catharina was born to Count Axel Johan Lillie (alternative spelling Lilje or Lillje) and Agneta Wrede. In 1709, she married count Magnus Julius De la Gardie. The marriage was arranged by her mother. His family had suffered from economic problems due to the Great Reduction of Charles XI of Sweden in the 1680s, and the marriage with Hedvig Catharina, who was from the wealthy Wrede family, saved her spouse from ruin. She had six children, among them being the scientist Eva Ekeblad. Her son married Cathérine Charlotte De la Gardie, and through her youngest daughter Hedvig Catharina De la Gardie she became the grandmother of Axel von Fersen the Younger.

Her spouse was a leading member of the Hats Party, which is said to have been founded in his salon. He is said to have introduced the political salon in Sweden in his home, where she acted as his hostess. Hedvig Catharina De la Gardie has been described as an intelligent beauty, and soon became a sympathizer and leading member of the Hats Party in her own right.

She also had a cultural impact. Her salon was the center of the noble amateur theatre, which flourished in Stockholm in the 1720s- and 1730s and is estimated to have played a part in the establishment of the first Swedish language professional theater at Bollhuset in 1737. Her daughter Brita Sophia was the female lead of the theatrical society Grev De la Gardies Comoedianter (Count De la Gardie's Comedians), and when the first Swedish national theater was founded in 1737, two of the first female actors there were recruited from among the servants of the De la Gardie household.

== Political activity ==
During the Swedish Age of Liberty, when absolute monarchy had been abolished in favor of a parliamentary system after the Great Northern War, it was noted that women participated in the political debate and party strife, promoting their opinions in public in a different way than had previously been the case, examples being Hedvig Mörner, Magdalena Elisabeth Rahm and Henrika Juliana von Liewen, and it was even said that women were the true leaders of the political parties. Foreign powers participated in political life through their ambassadors by recruiting agents to forward their agenda and supporting party factions with subsidies. France was particularly active early on through its ambassador in Stockholm, Charles Louis de Biaudos de Casteja, who was known to recognize the value of female agents and recruited several during his tenure in Sweden, among them Margareta Gyllenstierna (spouse of Arvid Horn), and Charlotta von Liewen.

Hedvig Catharina De la Gardie became one of the most known of these female figures in the political life of the early Age of Liberty. During the 1730s, she was a well-known public figure, her salon being a center of the Hats Party, and she wore ribbons signalling her political sympathies. In 1731, she, along with Eleonora Lindhielm (spouse of the Hat party member Daniel Niklas von Höpken), participated in the campaign to persuade Hedvig Taube to agree to become the king's mistress: their task was to convince Taube's mother to agree, which they apparently succeeded in doing. Taube became an effective method of the Hats to apply pressure to the king. In 1734, when Hedvig Taube was made an official royal mistress and her relationship became public, De la Gardie supported her during the initial social ostracism of Taube: visited her and invited her to visit.

The new public participation of women in politics through political salons, which were a new invention in Sweden imported from France, was criticized in the press, and De la Gardie was especially exposed to criticism as a known example. Her political activism exposed her to the same slander as other politicians, and libellous pamphlets circulated accusing her of allowing her love affairs to affect her political sympathies. Among them were the rumor planted by Fryxell, exposing her alleged affair with a young nobleman of the Sture family. In 1733 Olof von Dahlin caricatured the political Swedish salon hostess in Den Swänska Argus as "Fru Kättia Sällskapslik" (Mrs Lusty Society) and condemned her for "laughing at virtue" by spending so much time with men and exchanging flirtatious jokes with them.

Pending the Riksdag of 1734, the leading Hat party member Carl Gyllenborg gave her the task of conducting negotiations with the French ambassador in Stockholm, Charles Louis de Biaudos de Casteja, and obtain French subsidies for the Hat Party, thereby making an alliance between the party in France, a task she successfully fulfilled. Her collaboration with Casteja and her role in allying the Hats Party with France attracted libellous criticism, and she was caricatured as "a beautiful and well bred horse", which "had long been running along with a stallion from Gaul", and that "The French have so thoroughly penetrated the senses of some of our women ministers, that they have willingly given them their trust", referring to her and Casteja.

When an election was due for the Riksdag of 1738, the Hats Party withdrew its support for the king's relationship with Hedvig Taube, and instead made itself the organ for popular discontent with that relationship. Hedvig Catharina participated in the campaign by arranging a French play in her private theater to celebrate the birthday of the king, to which she invited the queen. The queen excused herself from the reception when she was informed that the play was in fact a caricature of the king's relationship with Hedvig Taube, but the play was performed and contributed successfully to the propaganda in favor of the Hats Party and its stand against the adultery of the king in the Riksdag of 1738. The Riksdag election resulted in the fall of the Caps Party Government of Arvid Horn and a new Hats Party government supported by France.

After the death of Daniel Niklas von Höpken in 1741, De la Gardie became the informal leader and central figure of the Carl Gyllenborg faction within the Hats Party government.

== Later life ==
After the death of her spouse in 1741, Hedvig Catharina De la Gardie settled in Paris in France in the company of her daughter Brita Sophia, where she converted to Roman Catholicism, which was at that point formally a crime in Sweden. She reportedly spent million livres in France, participated in aristocratic high society life, being described as a daily guest at the royal court at the Palace of Versailles. She had incurred large debts by the time of her death in 1745. After her death, her daughter, who converted with her, joined a convent as a nun, living until 1797.

== See also ==
- Eva Helena Löwen, who played a similar role in the service of France and the Hats Party at the end of the Age of Liberty.
