= Christina Beata Dagström =

Swedish Baroness and Glass works (1691-1754)

- Born: 1691
- Died: 1754 (aged 62–63)
- Known for: Managing Henrikstorps glasbruk
- Spouse: Olof Dagström
- Parents: Jöran Adlersteen (father); Maria Ehrenberg (mother)

Christina Beata Dagström (1691–1754) was a Swedish baroness and glass works owner. She owned and managed the glass works Henrikstorps glasbruk from 1713 onward. She personally managed Henrikstorps glasbruk during the majority of its existence, and it belonged to the most successful glass works in Sweden during her tenure in management.

== Life ==
She was the daughter of Baron Jöran Adlersteen (died 1713) and Maria Ehrenberg (died 1713). She married the soldier and nobleman Olof Dagström in 1715; the couple had no children.

After the death of her parents in 1713, Christina Beata Dagström inherited Gyllebo Manor alone, as well as Gärsnäs Castle and the Henrikstorps glass works jointly with her sisters. Henrisktorp glass works was established by her father in 1692 and was at the time one of the most notable in Sweden. While the sisters owned the glass works jointly, Christina Beata managed it alone; she invested great personal interest in it and developed it to one of the most successful glass works in Sweden during her lifetime, second only to Kungsholmen glass works. After her death however the business sharply declined and Henrikstorp glass works did not survive her death many years (it closed down in 1762, eight years after her death). She was a respected businesswoman in her time and her activity it mentioned by Carl von Linné in his description of contemporary Sweden.

In accordance with marital law at the time, Christina Beata Dagström became a minor under the guardianship of her husband when she married in 1715. In her case, however, this placed no restrictions on her activity, as she and her husband lived separate lives during most of their marriage. Her husband served in the army during the Great Northern War and she did not live with him until 1723, eight years after they married. When he finally returned from the war, he submerged himself in pietism and wrote religious texts preaching against the Swedish state Church as well as the king, supporting Charles Frederick, Duke of Holstein-Gottorp claims on the throne against Ulrika Eleonora, Queen of Sweden and Frederick I of Sweden whom he accused of having murdered Charles XII of Sweden. Because of this, he was imprisoned in 1728 for crimes against the church and the crown and was sentenced to life imprisonment in 1731. Christina Beata Dagström was initially accused as his accomplice during the three year's long process, but was declared innocent by any involvement in the crime of her husband, who accused her of having betrayed him.
