= Emerentia von Düben =

Swedish lady-in-waiting

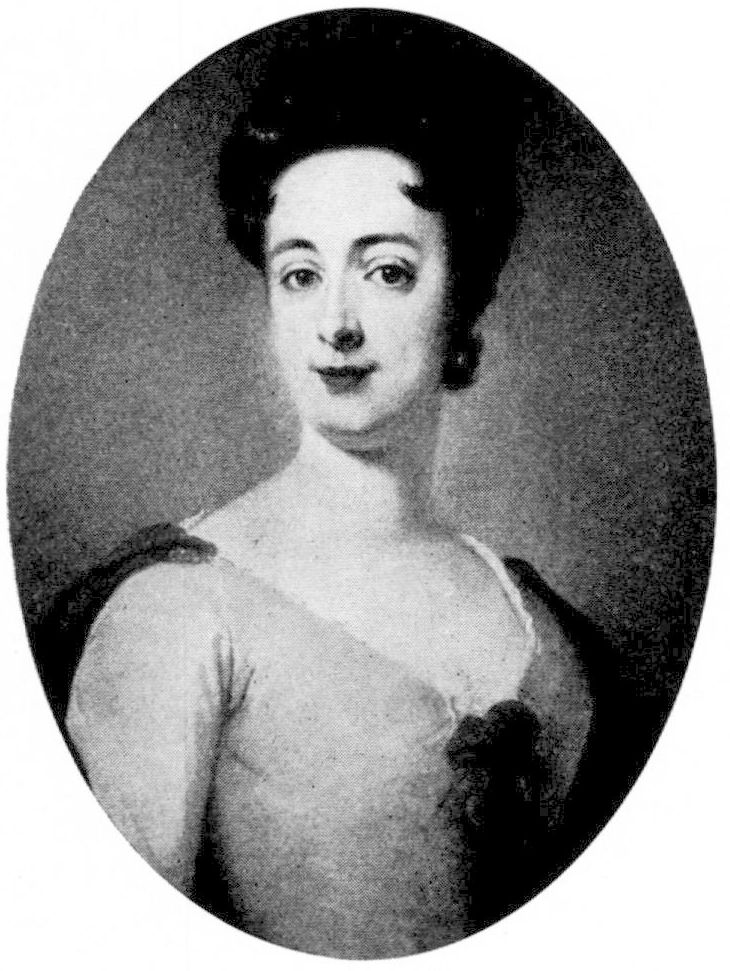
- Born: 24 May 1669; Stockholm, Sweden
- Died: 22 March 1743 (aged 73); Stockholm, Sweden
- Noble family: Düben
- Father: Gustaf Düben
- Mother: Emerentia Standaert
- Occupation: Lady-in-waiting

Emerentia von Düben (24 May 1669 – 22 March 1743) also called Menza, was a Swedish lady-in-waiting, the favourite of Ulrika Eleonora, Queen of Sweden. She was known for her influence over Ulrika Eleonora.

== Early life ==
Emerentia von Düben was born into the Düben family as the daughter of the organist and composer Gustaf Düben and Emerentia Standaert. She was a granddaughter of the German-born Baroque composer Andreas Düben, and a sister of Gustaf von Düben the Younger, Joachim von Düben the Elder (father of Ulrika Eleonora von Düben, also a royal favourite), and Anders von Düben the Younger.

Probably born in Stockholm, Menza was initially employed as a lady's maid at the court of the queen, Ulrika Eleonora. In 1690, she was made responsible for Princess Ulrika Eleonora. In 1707 Menza was ennobled along with her brothers, in 1717 she officially became lady-in-waiting, and in 1719, she was given the title Baroness (Swedish: Friherrinna). She had the same position with Ulrika Eleonora, which Juliana Schierberg had to the elder Princess, Hedvig Sophia of Sweden.

== Court career ==
=== Reign of Ulrika Eleonora ===
Emerentia von Düben stood by Ulrika's side her entire life as her support and adviser and enjoyed great influence: "For better and for worse nurturing, serving, accompanying and comforting". Menza was described as a religious bigot and was envied, but she was never a subject of slander or scandals. She supported the right of Ulrika Eleonora to the throne before that of Hedvig Sophia of Sweden and her son, and encouraged the competition between the two parties. The common belief at court was that the way to Ulrika Eleonora went through Menza, and she received large sums of money from foreign diplomats and supplicants to use her influence. The baroness is not considered to have abused her influence. She did, however, gather a great fortune.

She negotiated the marriage between Ulrika Eleonora and Frederick of Hesse for the interest of 30,000 German thaler between 1710 and 1715. In 1714, the Russian agent Prince Chilkov was given the task by Peter the Great to issue peace negotiations with Ulrika Eleonora through Menza.

During the reign of Ulrika Eleonora in 1718-1720, Menza and her brothers where regarded to exert an undue influence over the affairs of state. According to the Austrian ambassador, Menza had access to the bed chamber of Ulrika Eleonora before that of the queen's consort. In 1720, the Düben siblings supported the idea that Ulrika Eleonora should not abdicate but rather be the co-regent of her consort. Their influence was reportedly one reason as to why a co-regency was not accepted. According to Axel von Fersen the Elder, Ulrika Eleonora neither saw nor felt with any eyes other than Emerentia von Düben's.

=== Reign of Frederick ===
In 1732, Emerentia von Düben convinced the queen not to display her displeasure over the affair between King Frederick and Hedvig Taube in public. Ulrika Eleonora was very displeased over the adultery of her consort, and confided herself in Menza. Menza stated that it would be undignified for Ulrika Eleonora to notice this affair and that her position as queen was untouchable: "As the moon continue its course over the sky with no care for the barks of dogs, so should Her Majesty despise the gossip, which has been unleashed by this so unfortunate and blind commitment" For this, King Frederick was grateful to Menza.

Menza received a large inheritance from the queen in 1741, and at her own death in 1743, left a fortune of $200,000, the yearly wage of 877 chamber maids (the position in which she had started) put together. Upon her death, the poet Olof von Dalin wrote of her:

"... as long as there is virtue, it is impossible for the glory of it to fade. And as long as one remembers Ulrika Eleonora, one will remember Miss Düben."

== See also ==
- Bertha Zück
- Anna Catharina von Bärfelt

== Sources ==
- Anrep, Gabriel (1858). Svenska adelns ättar-taflor (in Swedish). P. A. Norstedt u. Söhne.
- Forss, Charlotta. "Emerentia von Düben" (in Swedish). Svenskt kvinnobiografiskt lexikon.
- Fryxell, Anders (1864). Berättelser ur svenska historien (in Swedish). L.J. Hierta.
- Hildebrand, Bengt (1945). "Düben, Düben von, släkt" (in Swedish). National Archives of Sweden. p. 634.
- Hofberg, Herman; Heurlin, Frithiof; Millqvist, Viktor; Rubenson, Olof (1906). "3. Düben, Emerentia von (Svenskt biografiskt handlexikon)". runeberg.org (in Swedish) – via Project Runeberg.
- Lundh-Eriksson, Nanna (1976). Den glömda drottningen. Karl XII:s syster. Ulrika Eleonora D.Y. och hennes tid [The Forgotten Queen.The Sister of Charles XII. The Age of Ulrika Eleonora the Younger] (in Swahili). Norrtälje: Affärstryckeriet.
