= Wilhelm Karges =

German organist and composer

- Born: 1613/14; Berlin, Germany
- Died: 1699; Berlin, Germany

Wilhelm Karges (1613/14–1699), was a German organist and composer in the North German organ tradition. Much of Karges' life was spent in and around Berlin, where he was born, worked, and died. Karges came into contact with Sweelinck's student, Andreas Düben, through his travels in North Germany and the Low Countries, and became his assistant at the German Church in Stockholm. In January 1646 he was appointed chamber musician and composer at the court of the Elector Friedrich Wilhelm of Brandenburg in Berlin, and subsequently became organist at the cathedral there. His eyesight gradually deteriorated, and by the 1680s he had several assistants and had been relieved of many of his responsibilities. Still, his organ playing was apparently still of such high quality that in 1683 his salary was nearly doubled. Six of Karges' pieces are known to have survived, all for organ.
