= Charlotta von Liewen =

Swedish countess

Charlotta von Liewen (12 October 1683 – 10 January 1735) was a politically active Swedish countess. She was married to riksråd count Gustaf Bonde (1682–1764) and a collaborated with France.

She was the daughter of Bernhard von Liewen and Sigrid Oxenstierna af Croneborg and in 1708 married count Gustaf Bonde (1682–1764). As maid of honor to Princess Hedvig Sophia of Sweden in 1708, she was a part of the group at court who attempted to exile the influential Juliana Schierberg.

Charlotta von Liewen is described as a person with a great informal power position within Swedish politics. She is known to have played a part in the traitor process against Georg Heinrich von Görtz and count Gerhard von Dernath in 1718. They were both loyalists of the Holstein Party, as was her. Charlotta von Liewen managed to arrange a meeting between Dernath, who was supposed to be imprisoned, and Dankwardt, one of the commission's members. Dankwardt refused to accept bribes from Dernath. Charlotta von Liewen then had queen Ulrika Eleonora of Sweden fire Dankwardt, after which Dernath was freed.

Charlotta von Liewen is also confirmed to have been an agent of the French ambassador, Charles Louis de Biaudos de Casteja, who was known for his network of agents during his tenure in Sweden, especially female ones, such as Margareta Gyllenstierna and Hedvig Catharina Lillie. Casteja reported that France could use her influence over her spouse by feeding her ambitions for his career. In 1731, Casteja aided her in acquiring an advancement for her spouse, her son, who was in French service, was appointed capten for the French regiment Comte de Saxe and she herself was given a pair of diamond earrings by order of Louis XV of France. She was not the only woman in Sweden to collaborate as an agent for France, but the dealings between Lieven and Casteja was more clearly documented than most.

After her death, the French ambassador reported that Bonde could no longer be expected to act for French interests, for although his next spouse also acquired influence over his policy, she was no friend of France.
