= Gärsnäs Castle =

Building in Simrishamn Municipality, Skåne County, Sweden

- Gärsnäs slott
- Simrishamn Municipality
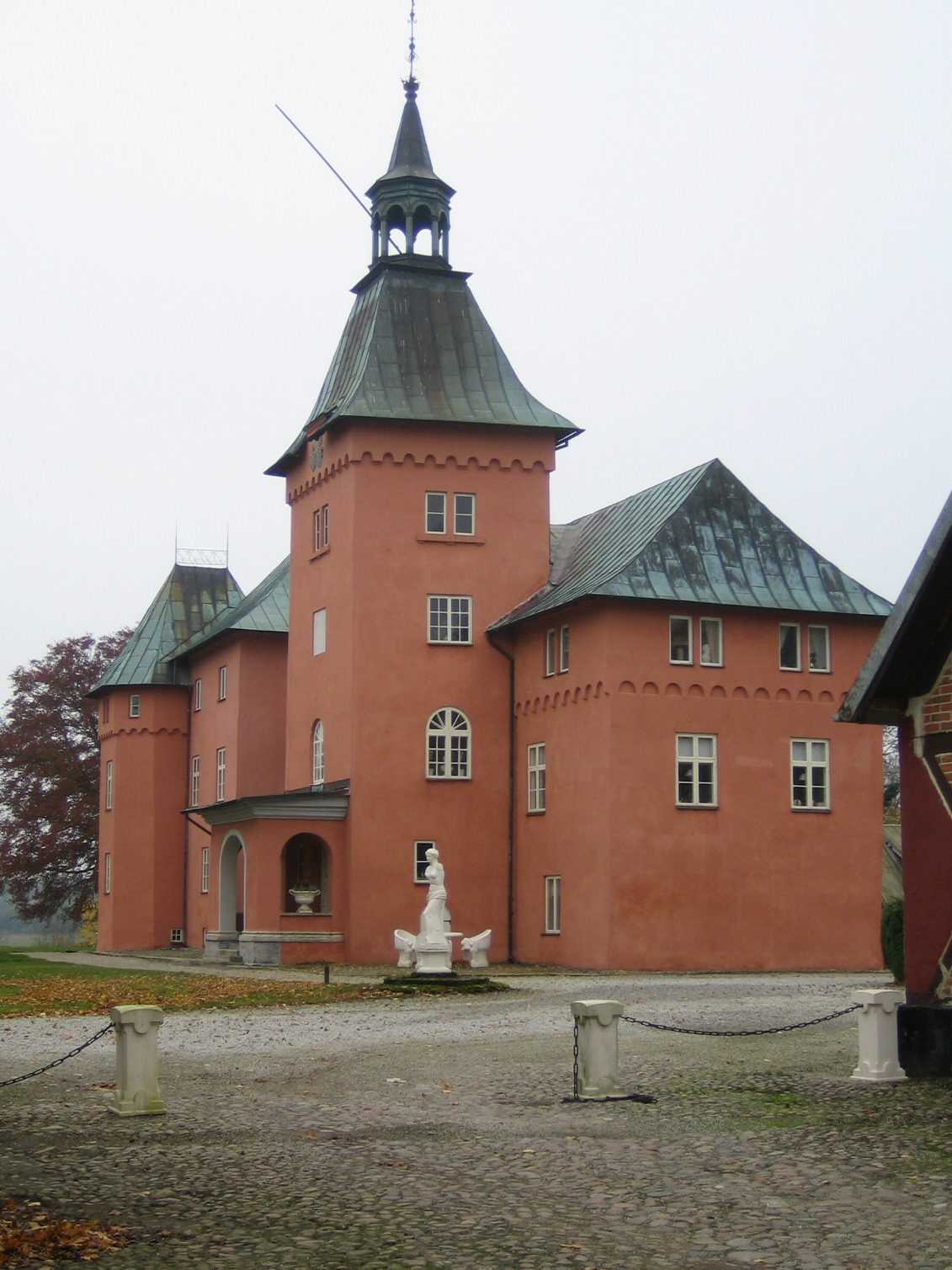
- Gärsnäs Castle

Site information
- Type: Castle
- Open to the public: Unknown

Location
- Scania, Sweden
- Coordinates: 55.5328°N 14.1767°E

Site history
- Built: 14th century

Gärsnäs Castle (Swedish: Gärsnäs slott) is a castle in Simrishamn Municipality, Scania, in southern Sweden.

The castle is mentioned in the 14th-century, and was originally a fortress surrounded by a moat, owned by the Drefelt family. The present castle was built by the landowner Falk Lykke, who acquired it from the Drefelt family in 1630. In 1658, it was acquired by Heinrich Rantzau. It was bought by the Swedish Baron Jöran Adlersteen in 1702 and inherited jointly by his three daughters, one of whom was Christina Beata Dagström, in 1713. The castle is still privately owned.

== See also ==
- List of castles in Sweden
