= Östra Vemmerlöv =

Locality in Simrishamn Municipality, Sweden

Coordinates: 55°35′N 14°15′E

Östra Vemmerlöv is a locality situated in Simrishamn Municipality, Skåne County, Sweden

The well-preserved medieval Östra Vemmerlöv Church lies here.

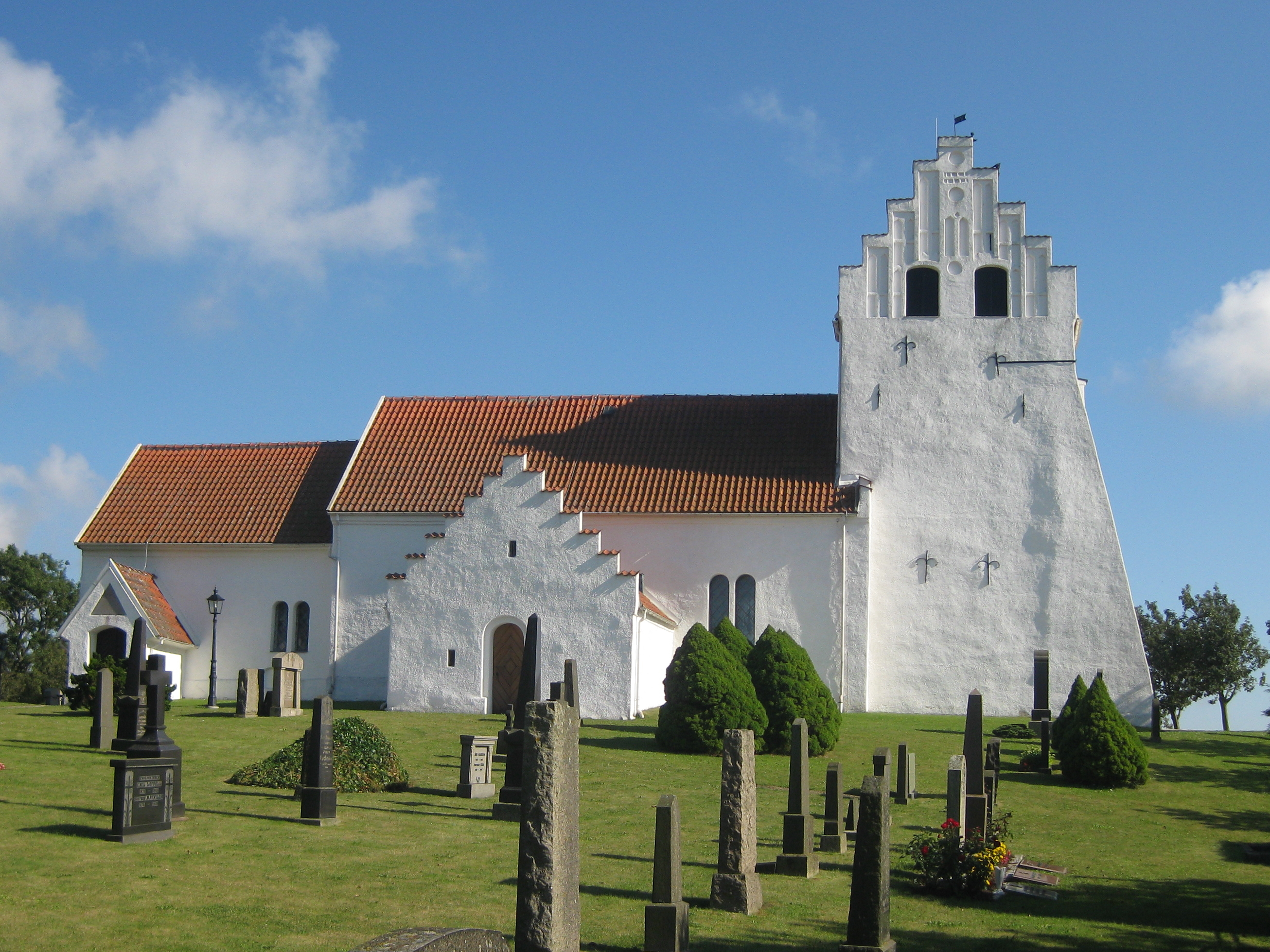
Östra Vemmerlöv Church
