= Margareta Gyllenstierna =

Swedish countess

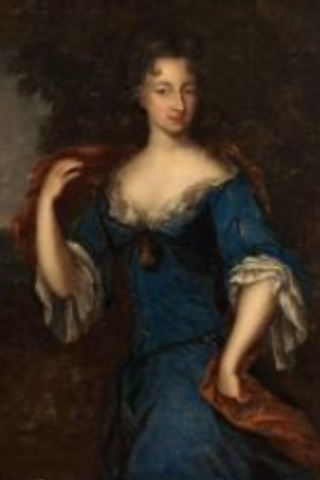
Margareta Gyllenstierna

Margareta Gyllenstierna af Fogelvik (c. 1689 – 26 January 1740), was a politically active Swedish countess, married to Arvid Horn, the President of the Privy Council Chancellery (1710–1719 and 1720–1738) and one of the leading figures of the Swedish Age of Liberty.

== Life ==
Margareta Gyllenstierna was the 6th of 10 children of Count Nils Karlsson Gyllenstierna (1648-1720) and Anna Christina Gyllenstierna af Björksund (1657-1715): her year of birth is not stated, but it is likely 1689, as she was born in between her sisters Sidonia (1688-1701) and Charlotta (1690-1695). Being the only child so survive to adulthood, she was the heiress of great estates in Småland and Östergötland. She married Horn in his third marriage in 1710. She had five children, two sons and three daughters.

During the 1720s and 1730s, Margareta Gyllenstierna and Arvid Horn played a similar role as Magdalena Stenbock and Bengt Gabrielsson Oxenstierna in the 1680s and 1690s, and Christina Piper and Carl Piper in the 1700s: that of a married couple acting as political colleagues.

Gyllestierna was among the influential political spouses who collaborated with the French ambassador Charles Louis de Biaudos de Casteja, who was known to engage female agents in Sweden for France, such as Charlotta von Liewen and Hedvig Catharina Lillie. Casteja often mentions her in his reports and refers to her influence of her powerful spouse by describing the political views of Count Horn as the views of the Count and Countess Horn, as if they were one joint politician who shared the position of Arvid Horn. Margareta Gyllenstierna gave Casteja information and analyses about which people who was in a politically favourable position, and she further more accepted supplicants through Casteja. The collaboration between Gyllenstierna and Casteja was broken on her initiative when the policy of Horn clashed with French interests, and she chose the interests of Horn before that of France. She demonstrated her change of attitude by a public demonstration of displeasure when Casteja congratulated her spouse at one of his political achievements.

Margareta Gyllenstierna maintained a political correspondence with the queen of France, Marie Leszczyńska, and the former Polish queen, Catherine Opalińska, both of whom were known as acquaintances of Horn since their stay in Sweden in 1709-1714.

== See also ==
- Hedvig Mörner, a contemporary politically active woman in Sweden during the 1720s- and 1730s
