= Ulrika Eleonora von Düben =

Ulrika Eleonora von Düben (18 March 1722 – 23 August 1758), was a Swedish Courtier, favourite of the queen of Sweden, Louisa Ulrika of Prussia.

== Life ==
Ulrika Eleonora von Düben was born to Baron Joachim von Düben the Elder and Margareta Spegel. She was the paternal niece of the royal favourite Emerentia von Düben, and her family belonged to the circles of the court. In 1748, she was appointed hovfröken (maid of honour) to crown princess Louisa Ulrika, who became queen three years later. In 1756, she was promoted to the position of kammarfröken, when her predecessor Ulrika Strömfelt, was forced to leave court after her involvement in exposing the Coup of 1756.

Normally, queen Louisa Ulrika seldom attached herself to her ladies-in-waiting, but von Düben became her acknowledged favorite and confidant among the ladies-in-waiting. Axel von Fersen the Elder described her and a typical representative of an ingratiating court noble, and wrote of her:

"Miss Düben, daughter of R.R. Düben, became the only favorite to the Queen among her ladies-in-waiting. This Miss von Düben was a temperamental and cunning :woman; she removed from court anyone, who could compete with her in intelligence and the confidence of the Queen. [...] this ... mark of court life, who :sacrifice everything for those above, and views anything made by Princes as recommendable. This Lady was very well seen by the Queen, and had not other :principle for her actions, than a mean spirit and her passion for Count Bielke, whom she eventually married."

During the Age of Liberty, representatives of the Caps (party) and Hats (party) was known to place their sympathizers as agents at the royal court, particularly women. Ulrika Eleonora von Düben was reportedly an agent of the Caps, and played a political role by making herself indispensable to the queen and maneuvering the agents of the Hats from the queen's circle. According to von Fersen, von Düben and Count Nils Bielke made a pact to successfully remove the queen's previous favorite, the Hat sympathizer Henrika Juliana von Liewen, von Liewen's spouse and brother from court; that she blocked any attempts of the riksråd Tessin, Ekeblad, Palmstierna and von Höpken from acquiring any influence over the royal couple, and that she, in pact with Bielke and Dalin, successfully orchestrated the fall of Carl Gustaf Tessin from his position as the queen's favorite.

Ulrika Eleonora von Düben left court upon her marriage Count Nils Bielke on 14 April 1757. She died the following year. After her death, her widower married her relative Fredrika Eleonora von Düben.
