= Gustaf Düben =

- Born: 1628; Stockholm, Sweden
- Died: 19 December 1690 (aged 61–62); Stockholm, Sweden
- Occupations: Composer; Organist
- Spouse: Emerentia Standaert (m. 1654; died 1679)
- Children: Gustaf; Emerentia; Joachim; Anders
- Parents: Andreas Düben; Anna Maria Gabrielen

Gustaf Düben (Swedish pronunciation: [ˈɡɵ̂sːtav dy:ʹbən]; 1624/1628 – December 19, 1690) was a Swedish organist and composer. Düben is best known for his contributions to the Düben collection, a collection of baroque music manuscripts.

== Early life ==
Gustaf Düben was born in Stockholm, Sweden, in the 1620s, into the Düben family. He was the son of the German-born organist Andreas Düben and Anna Maria Gabrielen (1609–1690). His mother served as a lady's maid to Maria Eleonora of Brandenburg and was the daughter of Peter Gabriel, a court musician at the Berlin royal court.

== Career ==
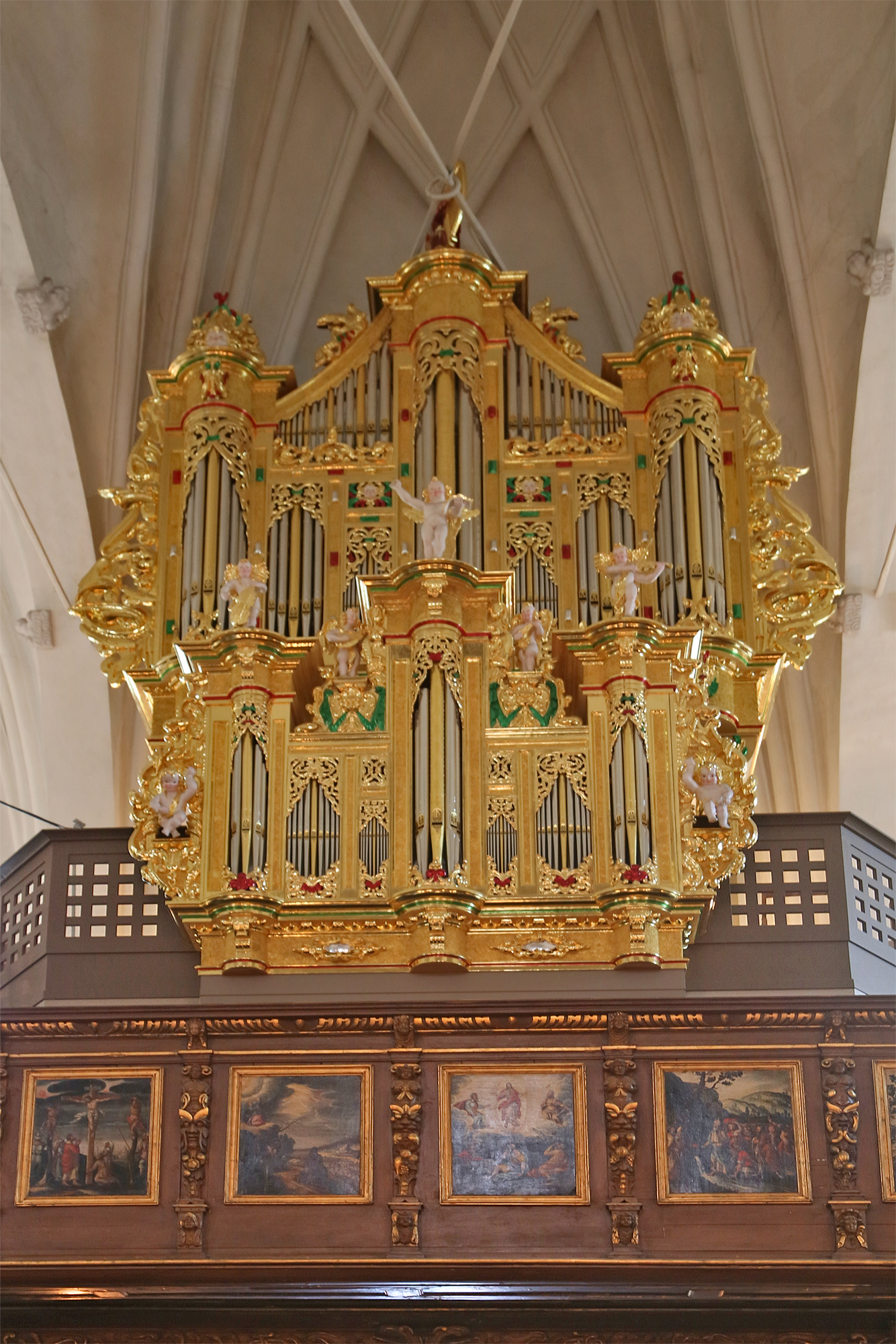
The Düben pipe organ at the German Church, Stockholm

In 1647 Gustav became part of the Swedish royal court orchestra, the Kungliga Hovkapellet, where he would succeed as Hofkapellmeister. He succeeded to the role in 1663, following his father's death the previous year. Both of his sons would follow in their father's footsteps, Gustaf holding the office from 1690 to 1698 and Anders von Düben the Younger from 1698 to 1726.

In addition to his court duties, he was organist at the German Church in Stockholm, and he also taught Hedwig Eleonora how to play instruments.

Düben composed a few works in the North German style prevalent in his time, including both vocal and instrumental music. He also composed the hymn "Jesus är min vän den bäste".

However, these do not constitute the most important aspect of his contribution to music. From the 1640s, Düben begun compiling a manuscript collection of compositions from his time, some of which he had acquired from his travels in foreign lands. Named after him as the Düben collection, of which he was the main creator and/or collector, it is one of the most important sources for music of the 17th century, notably being the only surviving copy of many works by Dieterich Buxtehude.

Membra Jesu Nostri, BuxWV 75, a cycle of seven cantatas, were dedicated to Gustaf Düben.

== Personal life ==
In 1654, Düben married Emerentia Standaert (d. 1679), the daughter of rich Dutch merchant, Niclas Standaert (d. 1655) and his wife, Ursula de Neef (d. 1683) from Leiden. They had at least nine children together, including Gustaf (1660–1726); Emerentia, also called Menza, (1669–1743); Joachim (1671–1730); and Anders (1673–1738).

Gustaf Düben is the progenitor of all branches of the Düben family, including the now-dissolved branch which originated with Gustaf von Düben the Younger (1659–1726) (No. 135). This is a different noble branch from the one that still survives (No. 139), which is also officially introduced (or registered/listed) at the House of Nobility in Stockholm.

Düben died in 1690, and was buried on February 1, 1691 at Saint James's Church, Stockholm.
