= Erland Broman =

Swedish official and noble (1704–1757)

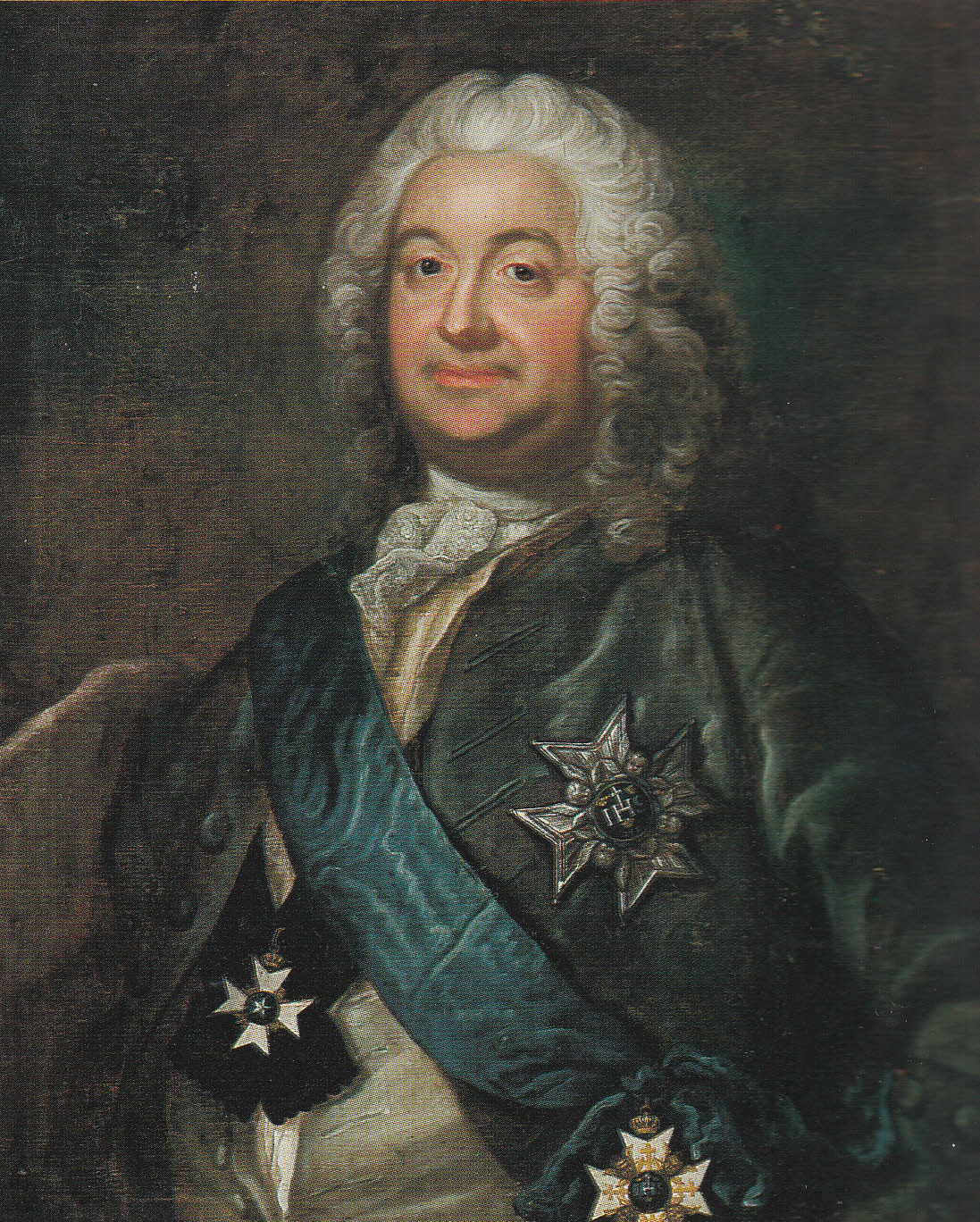
Erland Broman. Oil painting by Jakob Björck, 1770.

Erland Carlsson Broman (1 November 1704 – 19 January 1757) was a Swedish official and noble, and a favorite of King Frederick I of Sweden.

Broman was from a lesser noble family and son of lagman Karl Broman and Eva Hök.

He became a courtier of King Frederick in 1722, and soon became a personal friend and trusted confidant of the monarch, who entrusted him with the task to organize his infidelities and love affairs. In 1731, he introduced Hedvig Taube to Frederick and managed to install her as an official royal mistress. The same year, he was made kammarherre, courtier. After the death of Hedvig Taube in 1744, he introduced her successor, Catharina Ebba Horn. In return for this and similar favors, he was awarded with titles, money and offices: he became the chamberlain of the royal court in 1741 and president of commerce in 1747. Broman frequently used his favored position to accept bribes. Politically he was an ally of the Hats. Despite his great income, he became poor after the death of Frederick due to his gambling and business speculations.

He married Eva Johanna Drakenhielm (1704-1747) in 1726, and in 1747, the maid of honor Vilhelmina Magdalena Taube (1720-1757), sister of the royal mistress Hedvig Taube.
