= Bertha Zück =

Favourite of Queen Josephine

Anna Barbara "Bertha" Zück (2 February 1797 – 20 February 1868 at Stockholm Palace), also called Babette, was the German favourite confidant, Lady's maid and ultimately the treasurer of Queen Josephine of Sweden.

== Life ==
Bertha Zück arrived to Sweden from Bavaria in the entourage of Josephine of Leuchtenberg at her wedding with the Crown Prince of Sweden in 1823. Josephine became Queen in 1844.

Zück was, alongside Josephine's Catholic confessor, Lorentz Studach (d. 1873), Josephine's most intimate friend and favourite: Zück, Studach and Josephine was so close that they were referred to at the royal court as "the Trio". Originally employed as a lady's maid, Bertha Zück was later appointed to the post of the Queen's treasurer, an unusual post for a woman in the 19th century. Zück was the only person in the Royal Court who participated in the Catholic masses conducted by Studach in the queen's private chapel, aside from the queen herself.

When Zück fell ill in 1866, she was attended to, on the queen's instructions, by a Catholic nun of the order of Saint Elisabeth named Valeria; the first nun of this order to arrive in Sweden.

== See also ==
- Emerentia von Düben
