= Charles Louis de Biaudos de Casteja =

French diplomat

Charles-Louis de Biaudos, Count of Castéja (1693–1755) was a French diplomat. He was the French ambassador to Sweden in 1727–1737.

He was the second son of Jean de Biaudos, Marquis de Castéja and Marie Midot de Villers. In 1718 he married Jeanne de Paris, with whom he had a son.

As French ambassador in Sweden, Casteja worked for an alliance between France and Sweden during the War of the Polish Succession in 1733–38. No earlier foreign ambassador participated so openly in politics in Sweden as did Casteja. He constructed a network of Swedish agents to work for French interests, including Margareta Gyllenstierna - who also maintained a political correspondence with the queen of France, Marie Leszczyńska - Charlotta von Liewen and Hedvig Catharina Lillie. He also unsuccessfully attempted to recruit the king's mistress, Hedvig Taube. He was recalled to France at the request of the Swedish government in 1737.
