= Catharina Ebba Horn =

Swedish noble and the second official royal mistress (1720–1781)

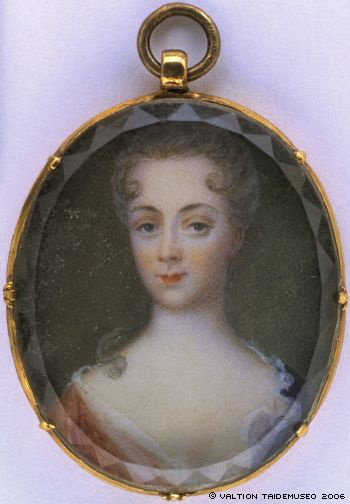
Catarina Ebba Horn af Åminne

Catharina Ebba Horn af Åminne (27 May 1720 – 12 September 1781 in Jakobsberg) was a Swedish noble and the second official royal mistress of King Frederick I of Sweden from 1745 to 1748. She was one of two official royal mistresses in Sweden. She had no influence over state affairs, but she did patronise careers through her powerful connections and her position.

== Biography ==
=== Background ===
Catharina Ebba Horn was born the child of the Colonel Baron Krister Horn and Anna Regina Sjöblad. She was the sister of Count Fredric Horn af Åminne (1725-1796) and Gustaf Adolf Horn af Åminne (1721-1793). When the official mistress of the king, Hedvig Taube, died in 1744 the royal court was in search for a replacement. The king had at this point a bad reputation because of his open and frequent use of prostitutes from the streets and his alcoholism. However, the fact that he had made Hedvig Taube an official mistress had set an example. Catharina Horn was unmarried at an age when most women of the nobility had already wed. She was described as a handsome blonde and was suggested by Erland Broman, who was a known procurer for sexual partners to the monarch. The suggestion was supported by her mother, who was described as a plotting intriguer.

Catharina Horn and her mother placed several terms before agreeing to the position of mistress to the king, after having first demanded that he marry her. They demanded, that if the king did not marry her, that the position of mistress should be a formal and officially recognized position in the manner of Hedvig Taube, that she would receive a title in her own right and her own income, in the French form of royal mistress and "queen to the left", which had been granted Hedvig Taube, and finally, that the relationship would not be broken.

Initially, they also demanded that Horn should be received at court with rank directly after the women of the royal house, but they gave up this demand after the Crown Princess, Louisa Ulrika of Prussia, stated that if Horn was officially presented with the position as royal mistress, she would not be received at court at all. The rest of the demands were met, however, and in the autumn of 1745, Horn and her mother was given an official welcome to Stockholm by the monarch and three riksråd and given the former palace of Hedvig Taube at Riddarholmen as their residence. In 1746, the king, in his position as Landgrave of Hesse, applied for a noble title from the German Roman emperor for her in the same fashion as he had done for Hedvig Taube, and she received the title of countess.

=== Royal mistress ===
Catharina Ebba Horn was not able to acquire any influence over state affairs through the monarch. However, she did manage to assemble a powerful net of contacts through her position, which she is known to have used to benefit the career of protégées. Carl Johan Aminoff, who career she supported, described her as "... the mightiest in the kingdom, able to acquire what she wanted from the powerful", and that she introduced him to several of her contacts, in which he included the Ambassador of France, Axel von Fersen the Elder, Riksråd Carl Otto Hamilton and General Baron Albrekt von Lantighausen, who in turn recommended him in France at her request.

Initially, she was regarded to have great significance because of her popularity with the monarch. As she and her mother was known as sympathisers of the Caps (party), the Hats (party) tried to depose her from her position by launching one of their sympathisers, a member of the Ribbing family, as her rival during the autumn of 1747, This failed as Ribbing herself did not care for the idea and rejected the king. Horn was upset over the fact that the monarch was constantly unfaithful and because he did not support her when the crown princess treated her with arrogance at court. King Frederic soon tired of her, as she did not speak French and poorly German and because she was not spiritual enough to cheer him up. In the autumn of 1748 after long negotiations, she finally agreed to leave her position as royal mistress of the monarch after having received a great fortune and three estates. Despite several attempts from the king to have it back, she kept the letter in which he promised her eternal love, which she showed to the crown princess.

The king died in 1751 and in 1762, she married Riksråd Count Ulrik Barck, who had been her admirer before her relationship with the king.

== See also ==
- Horn family

== Other sources ==
- Anteckningar om svenska qvinnor
- Nordisk familjebok / 1800-talsutgåvan. 6. Grimsby - Hufvudskatt
- Alice Lyttkens: Kvinnan börjar vakna. Den svenska kvinnans historia från 1700 till 1840-talet. Bonniers Stockholm 1976
- Vainio-Korhonen, Kirsi (2011). Sophie Creutz och hennes tid. Adelsliv i 1700-talets Finland.. Stockholm: Bokförlaget Atlantis. ISBN 91-7353-448-X
- Fryxell, Anders: Berättelser ur svenska historien, Volym 37–38
