= Gyllebo Manor =

Castle in Scania, Sweden

- Gyllebo slott
- Simrishamn Municipality
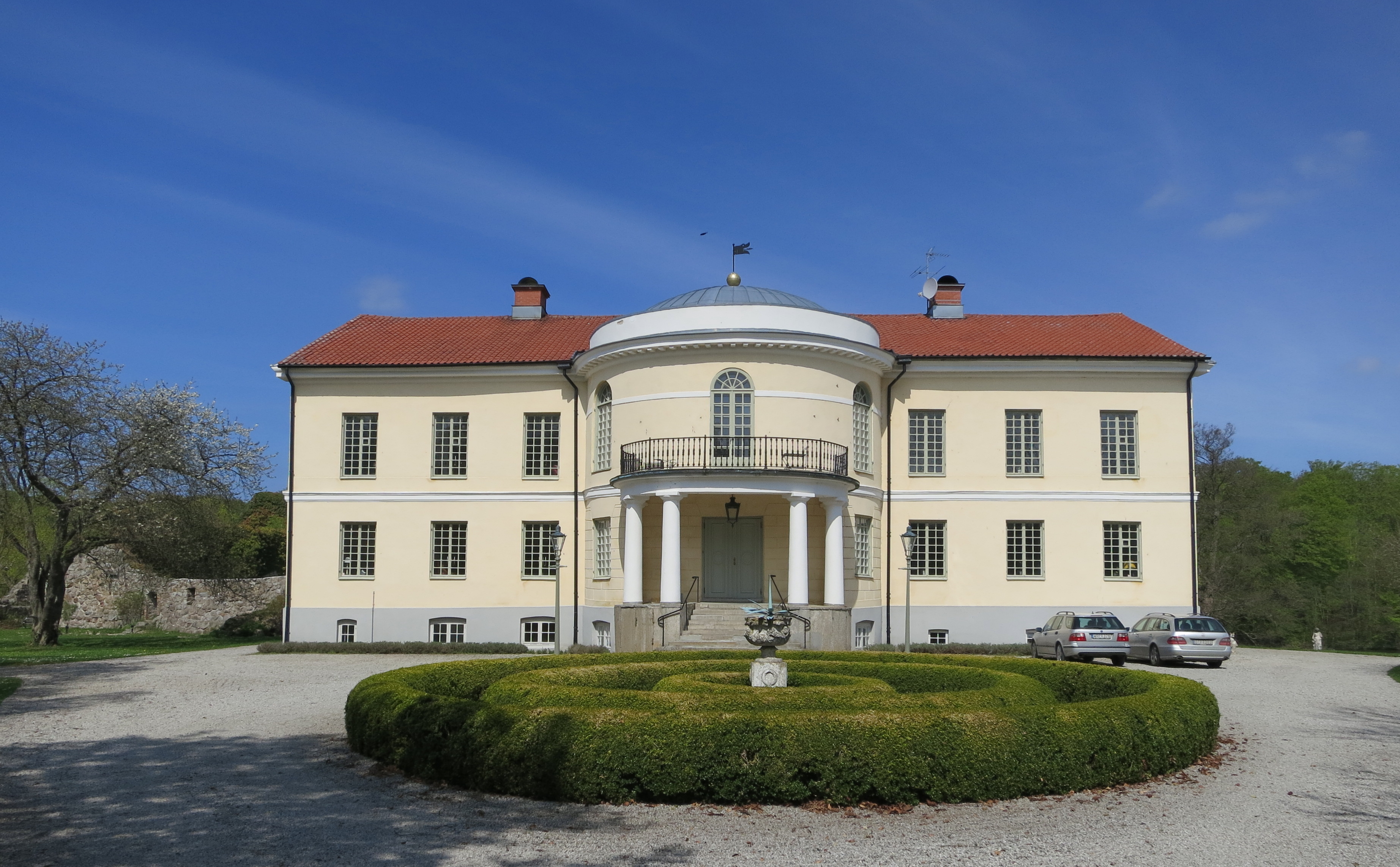
- Gyllebo Manor

Site information
- Type: Castle
- Open to the public: Unknown

Location
- Scania, Sweden
- Location within Skåne Location within Sweden
- Coordinates: 55.599069°N 14.196521°E

Site history
- Built: 1813-18

Gyllebo Manor (Swedish: Gyllebo slott) is a manor house in Simrishamn Municipality, Scania, in southern Sweden. Adjacent to the castle is Gyllebohus, the ruins of a 16th-century stronghold.

The fortress Gyllebohus was built by Laurids Lauridsen Knob in 1538–1544. It was at the time one of the biggest fortresses in Scania. The fortress burnt down in the early 18th-century. Between 1713 and 1754, the estate was owned by Christina Beata Dagström; because of the law of the minority of married women it was formally owned by her husband Olof Dagström, who was sentenced to life imprisonment for treason, but she managed it alone without his interference. After her death in 1754, it was owned by the Schönström family until 1904. The current manor house was built in Classic style in 1813-1818 by Hedvig Sofia Schönström.

In 1927, the land of the manor was divided up to smaller farms, and the authorities bought the manor house itself and converted it to a resting home. It functioned this way until 1971.

== See also ==
- List of castles in Sweden

== Sources ==
- Gyllebo i Nordisk familjebok (andra upplagan, 1909)
