= Andreas Düben =

Swedish composer

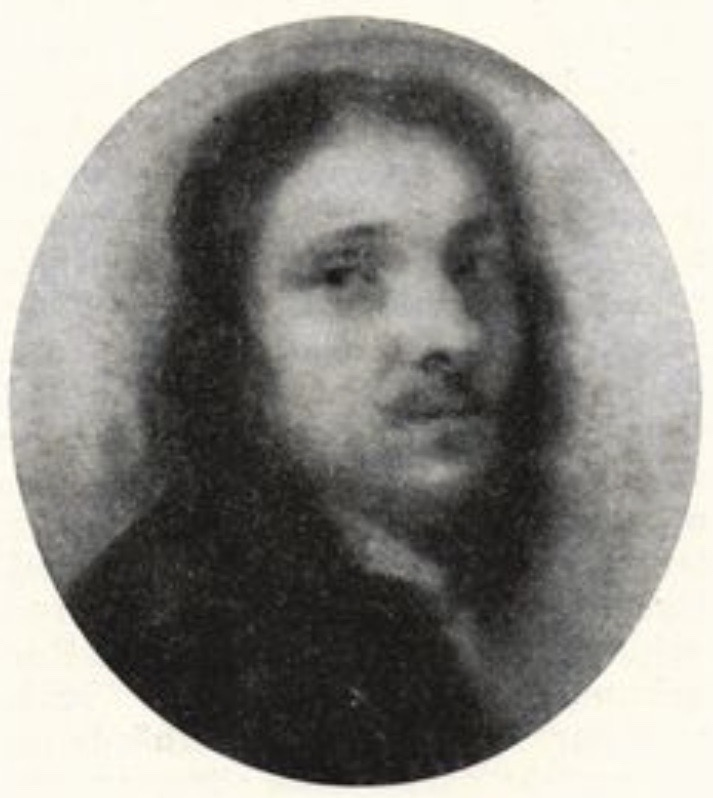
- Andreas Düben, painted by unknown artist.
- Born: Leipzig
- Died: 7 July 1662; Stockholm, Sweden
- Occupations: Composer; Organist
- Children: Gustaf Düben
- Relatives: Düben family

Andreas Düben (c. 1597 – 7 July 1662) was a Swedish Baroque composer and organist, and father of Gustaf Düben.

== Early life ==
Born in Leipzig, Saxony, into the Düben family, which would later be renowned for its contributions to classical music. He was the son of Andreas Düben, who was the organist at the St. Thomas Church, and Elisabeth Bessler, or Bletzchen, who was born in Wurzen.

In 1609, Düben was admitted to Leipzig University in 1609. He studied with the renowned Dutch pedagogue Jan Pieterszoon Sweelinck from 1614 until 1620.

== Career ==
In 1620, 1621 or 1625 he secured a position as organist in the Swedish court orchestra in Stockholm. He was appointed conductor of that same group in 1640. In addition to his activities at court, he served as organist of the German Church (from 1625), and Storkyrkan (from 1649/50). His assistant at the German Church was Wilhelm Karges. His surviving works include two choral works, a number of instrumental dances, and a handful of organ works. He composed a cantata, Pugna triumphalis, on the occasion of the death of Gustavus Adolphus.

== Family ==
Düben married Anna Maria Gabrielen who served as a lady's maid to Maria Eleonora of Brandenburg and was the daughter of Peter Gabriel, a court musician at the Berlin royal court. Andreas Düben was the father of Gustaf Düben.
