= Hedvig Mörner =

Swedish courtier and countess

Hedvig Mörner af Morlanda (1672–1753), was a Swedish courtier and countess, married to riksråd count Claes Ekeblad the Elder. She was a personal friend of Ulrika Eleonora, Queen of Sweden, and known in contemporary Sweden for her political activity: through her connections in the political world, she was able to make successful recommendations for political offices and affect the work in the riksdag.

== Life ==
She was born to general baron Hans Georg Mörner and Beata Schulman. Prior to her marriage, she served as maid of honor to the queen of Sweden, Ulrika Eleonora of Denmark, and she also became a personal friend of Princess Ulrika Eleonora, future queen. In 1692, she married riksråd count Claes Ekeblad the Elder.

Hedvig Mörner was known for being able to influence state affairs and make successful recommendations for public offices through her political connections, and a large correspondence is preserved bearing witness of how much, often and how successfully she performed services for supplicants. In contrast to what was otherwise common, she did not work merely through her spouse, but entertained a large net of powerful contacts among the government and had a personal power base which she could use. In her private life, she and her sister were known to have a great interest in gambling.

In 1734, she was involved in a conflict in the Riksdag. The opposition party of Arvid Horn worked to secure the position of field marshal for their sympathizer Göran Silfverhielm. They asked Mörner, being the mother-in-law of Silfverhielm and the personal friend of the queen, to convince the queen to persuade the king to recommend the suggestion to the parliament. This resulted in a conflict between the king and Arvid Horn which developed in a serious crisis. This incident is regarded typical for her political activity.
