= Carl Gyllenborg =

Swedish statesman and author (1679–1746)

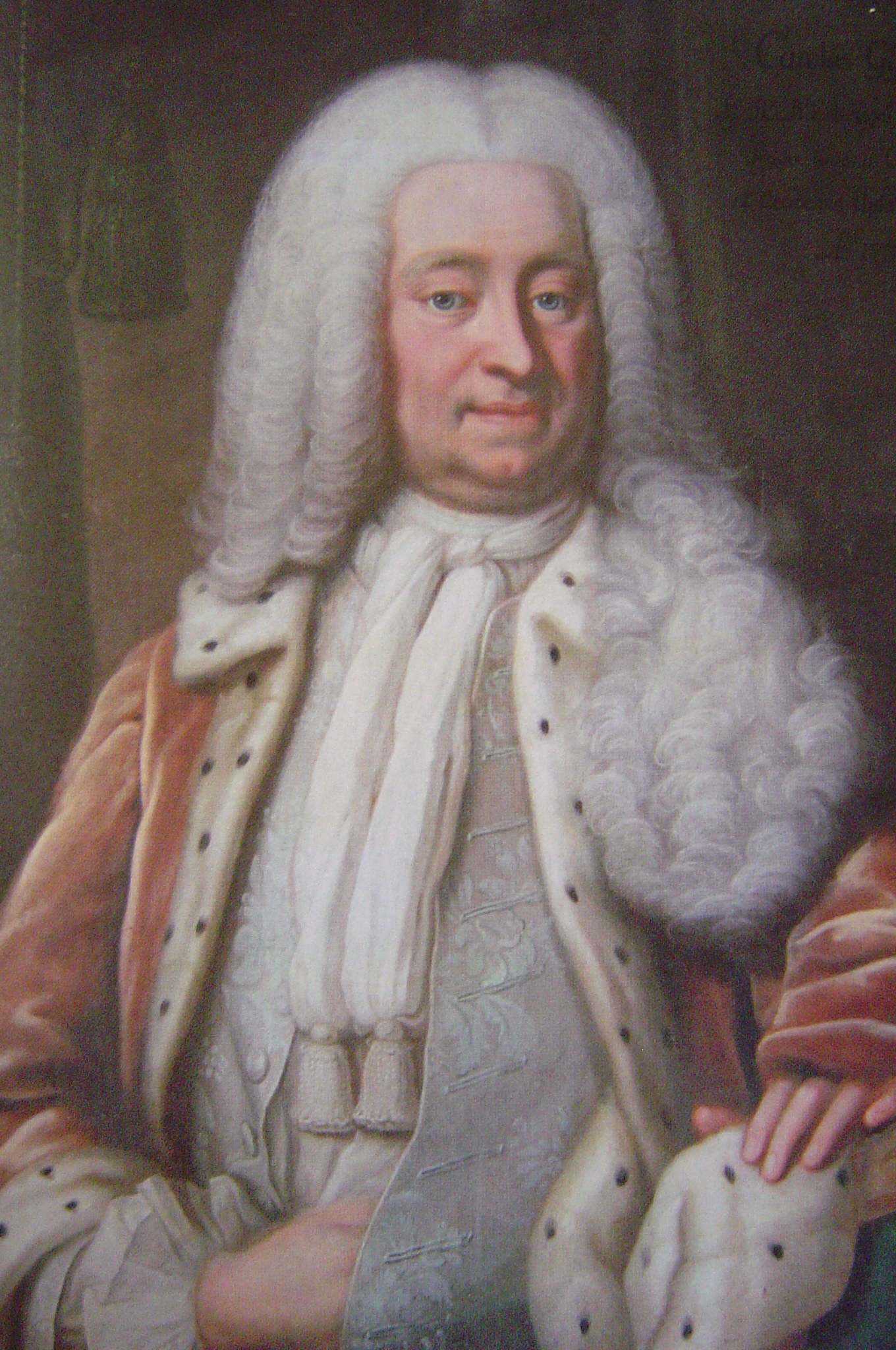

Personal details
- Born: 7 March 1679 Stockholm, Sweden
- Died: 9 December 1746 (aged 67) Uppsala, Sweden

Count Carl Gyllenborg (7 March 1679 – 9 December 1746) was a Swedish statesman and author.

== Biography ==
He was born in Stockholm, the son of Count Jacob Gyllenborg (1648–1701). His father was a Member of Parliament and of the Royal Council, who served as Governor of Uppland from 1689 to 1695.

After serving in the Polish War, he was sent to London as secretary of legation. There, he married the Jacobite Sara Wright. In 1715, he was made minister plenipotentiary, and two years later was imprisoned for five months because of his participation in the plot to reinstate the House of Stuart. In 1723, he was appointed Councilor of State, and in 1738 Chancery President (Swedish: Kanslipresident), that is both Prime Minister and Foreign Minister.

Whilst in this office, he founded Hattpartiet or Hattarna ('Hat' Party), which instigated the disastrous Russo-Swedish War (1741–1743), resulting in the loss of Kymmenegård. He was successively chancellor of the universities of Lund (1728) and Uppsala (1739), was a patron of letters and art, and wrote several poems and the first Swedish comedy, Den svenska Sprätthöken (1740). His Letters . . . Relating to a Design to Raise a Rebellion on His Majesty's Dominions, to be Supported by a Force from Sweden, were published in French and English (1717).

He was elected a Fellow of the Royal Society of London in 1711.
