= Ulrika Eleonora of Sweden =

Queen of Sweden from 1718 to 1741

Ulrika Eleonora
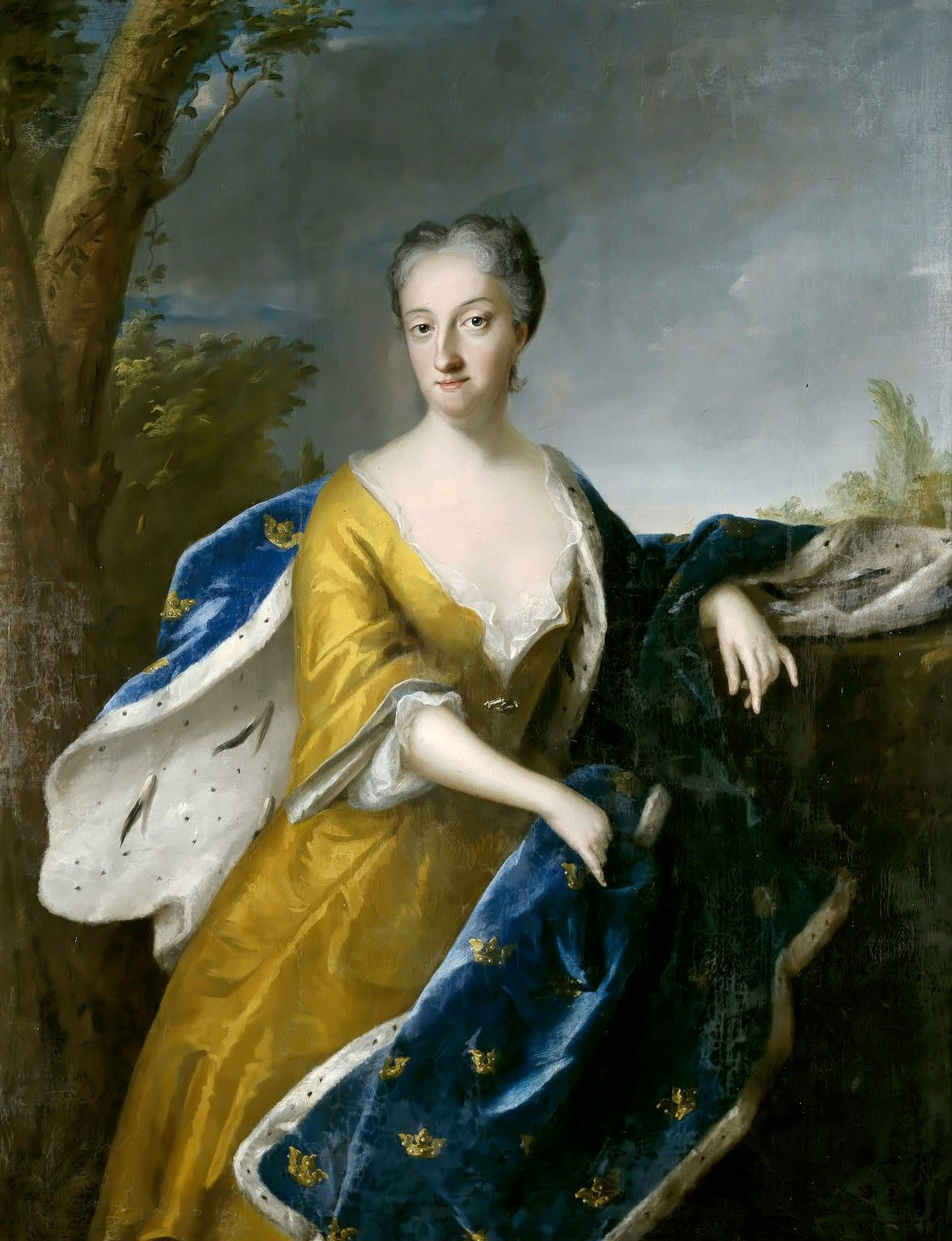
- Portrait by Georg Desmarées, 18th century

Queen of Sweden
- Reign: 5 December 1718 – 29 February 1720
- Coronation: 17 March 1719
- Predecessor: Charles XII
- Successor: Frederick I

Duchess of Bremen-Verden
- Reign: 5 December 1718 – 9 November 1719
- Predecessor: Charles XII
- Successor: George I

Queen consort of Sweden
- Tenure: 29 February 1720 – 24 November 1741
- Born: 23 January 1688; Stockholm Palace, Stockholm, Sweden
- Died: 24 November 1741 (aged 53); Stockholm, Sweden
- Burial: 1 December 1741; Riddarholmen Church
- Spouse: Frederick I of Sweden (m. 1715)
- House: Wittelsbach
- Father: Charles XI of Sweden
- Mother: Ulrika Eleonora of Denmark
- Religion: Lutheran

Ulrika Eleonora or Ulrica Eleanor (23 January 1688 – 24 November 1741), also known as Ulrika Eleonora the Younger, was Queen of Sweden from 5 December 1718 until her abdication on 29 February 1720 in favour of Frederick, her husband. Upon his accession, as King Frederick I, she served as his queen consort until her death on 24 November 1741.

Ulrika Eleonora was the youngest child of Sweden's King Charles XI and his wife, Ulrika Eleonora of Denmark. She was named after her mother, who became known as Ulrika Eleonora the Elder. In 1715, the younger Ulrika married Frederick of Hesse-Kassel. After the death of her brother Charles XII in 1718, she claimed the Swedish throne. By primogeniture, Charles Frederick of Holstein-Gottorp, son of Hedvig Sophia, her deceased elder sister, had the better claim; but citing the precedent of Queen Christina, Ulrika Eleonora asserted that, by proximity of blood, she was the closest surviving relative of the late king. After agreeing to renounce the powers of absolute monarchy established by her father, she was recognized as successor by the Riksdag. She abdicated on 29 February 1720.

== Princess and regent ==
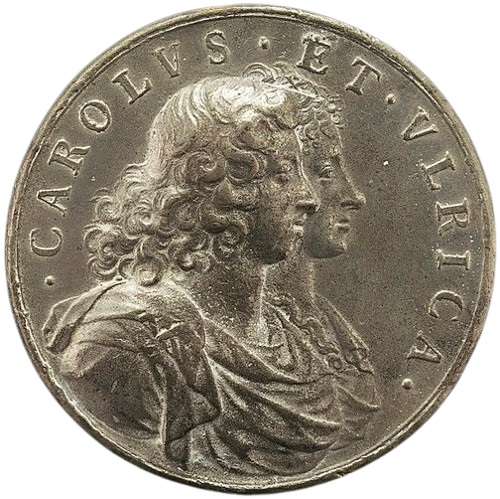
Ulrica Eleonora's parents, King Charles XI and Queen Ulrica Eleonora the Elder

Ulrika Eleonora was born on 23 January 1688, at Stockholm Palace in Stockholm, Sweden. She was the youngest child of King Charles XI of Sweden and his wife, Ulrika Eleonora of Denmark. Her elder siblings were Hedvig Sophia and Charles XII, who succeeded their father to the throne upon the latter's death in 1697.

After their mother's death in 1693, Ulrika Eleonora and her siblings were placed in the care of their grandmother, Hedwig Eleonora. However, her grandmother was known to favor her elder sister. During her childhood, Eleonora was somewhat overlooked in favor of this elder, more extroverted and talented sister, princess Hedvig Sophia. Her elder siblings enjoyed riding and dancing and reportedly somewhat looked down upon her as she did not have the courage to participate in their games and was easily brought to tears. She was described as friendly, modest and dignified, with good posture and beautiful hands, but she was not regarded as either intelligent or attractive. Her grandmother, Hedwig Eleonora, described her as stubborn, and she was known to demonstrate her dislike of others or of events by simulating illness. She was a talented musician, and when performing with her sister at court concerts, she would play the clavier while her sister sang. Ulrika Eleonora lived most of her life in the shadow of others, outshone by her brother the king, and by her attractive sister.

From 1700, she took care of her dominating grandmother, Hedwig Eleonora of Holstein-Gottorp, during her brother's absence in the Great Northern War. Her older sister, Hedvig Sophia, was then the heir presumptive to the throne.

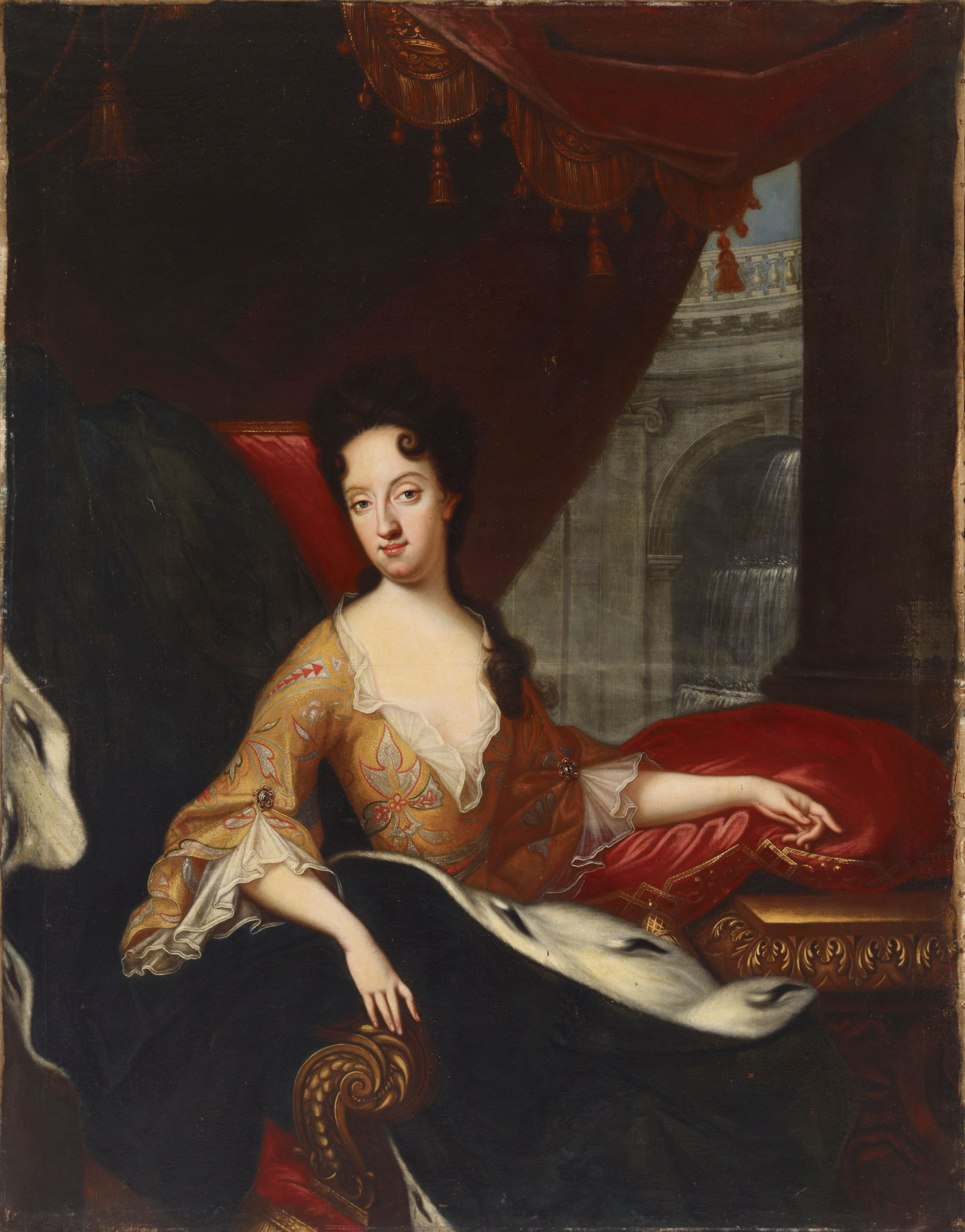
Portrait of a young Ulrika Eleonora

As their brother Charles XII was unmarried and childless, Ulrika Eleonora was regarded as a likely future heir to the throne, and was thereby attractive on the marriage market. In 1698, a marriage alliance was suggested by marrying her to Prince Charles of Denmark and her brother to Princess Sophia Hedwig of Denmark, but in 1700 this plan was discarded. In 1700, there were negotiations of a marriage to Frederick William I of Prussia, but nothing came of them. These plans were about to be put into effect when they were disrupted, without motivation, by her brother. She was later made the god-mother of Louisa Ulrika of Prussia, who was named Ulrika after her.

In 1702, a marriage to the future King George II of Great Britain was suggested, but was postponed, and in the end nothing came of it. Duke John William of Saxe-Gotha was given permission by her brother to court her, but the marriage plans were interrupted after he engaged in a duel with Anders Lagercrona in the presence of the monarch. In 1710, she received a proposal from Prince Frederick of Hesse. The negotiations were handled by her favorite and confidante Emerentia von Düben. The marriage was supported by her grandmother Hedwig Eleonora, as the Queen Dowager thought this would force Ulrika Eleonora to leave Sweden for Hesse, increasing the chances for the son of Ulrika Eleonora's elder sister, Hedvig Sophia of Holstein-Gottorp, to become heir to the throne. The engagement was announced on 23 January 1714, and the wedding took place 24 March 1715. During the wedding, her brother Charles XII remarked: "Tonight my sister is dancing away the crown".

After her grandmother's death in 1715, she became the center of the court, and this was one of the happiest periods of her life. In 1715, she married Landgrave Frederick I of Hesse-Kassel. The marriage, which on her side was a love-match, became another attempt to use her as a political puppet. Frederick had married her with the intent of reaching the throne, and immediately began plotting to have her named heir in place of her nephew. The "Hesse Party" and the "Holstein Party" stood against each other in the struggle for the throne.

Ulrika Eleonora's situation began to change after the death of her older sister, Hedvig Sophia, in 1708. Ulrika Eleonora became the only adult member of the royal house present in Sweden, aside from her grandmother, Queen Dowager Hedwig Eleonora. Already in late 1712, Charles XII had thoughts of making her regent during his absence. The royal council convinced her to be present at their meetings and give them her support. On 2 November 1713, she appeared at her first session, and a decision was made to assemble the Riksdag to declare her regent in her capacity as the closest heir to the throne. In 1713, the government and her grandmother named her regent during the king's absence and thus she became a pawn of the many powers struggling for influence in a country without an official heir presumptive or heir apparent. The choice now stood between Ulrika Eleonora and her nephew. Her accession as regent and president of the parliament was treated with great enthusiasm. The Riksdag had opposed her brother as they wanted to abolish the absolute monarchy and reinstate their own power. As regent, she kept herself informed of state affairs and urged her brother to return, warning him of the effects if he did not. With his permission she signed all documents of state affairs except those written to him personally. However, she regarded herself only as her brother's representative, and therefore made no suggestions of her own. As his sister, many times during the war, she had asked her brother if she could visit him, but was never permitted to. She met her brother for the first time after sixteen years in Vadstena in 1716, and after that one last time in Kristinehamn in 1718.

== Queen regnant ==
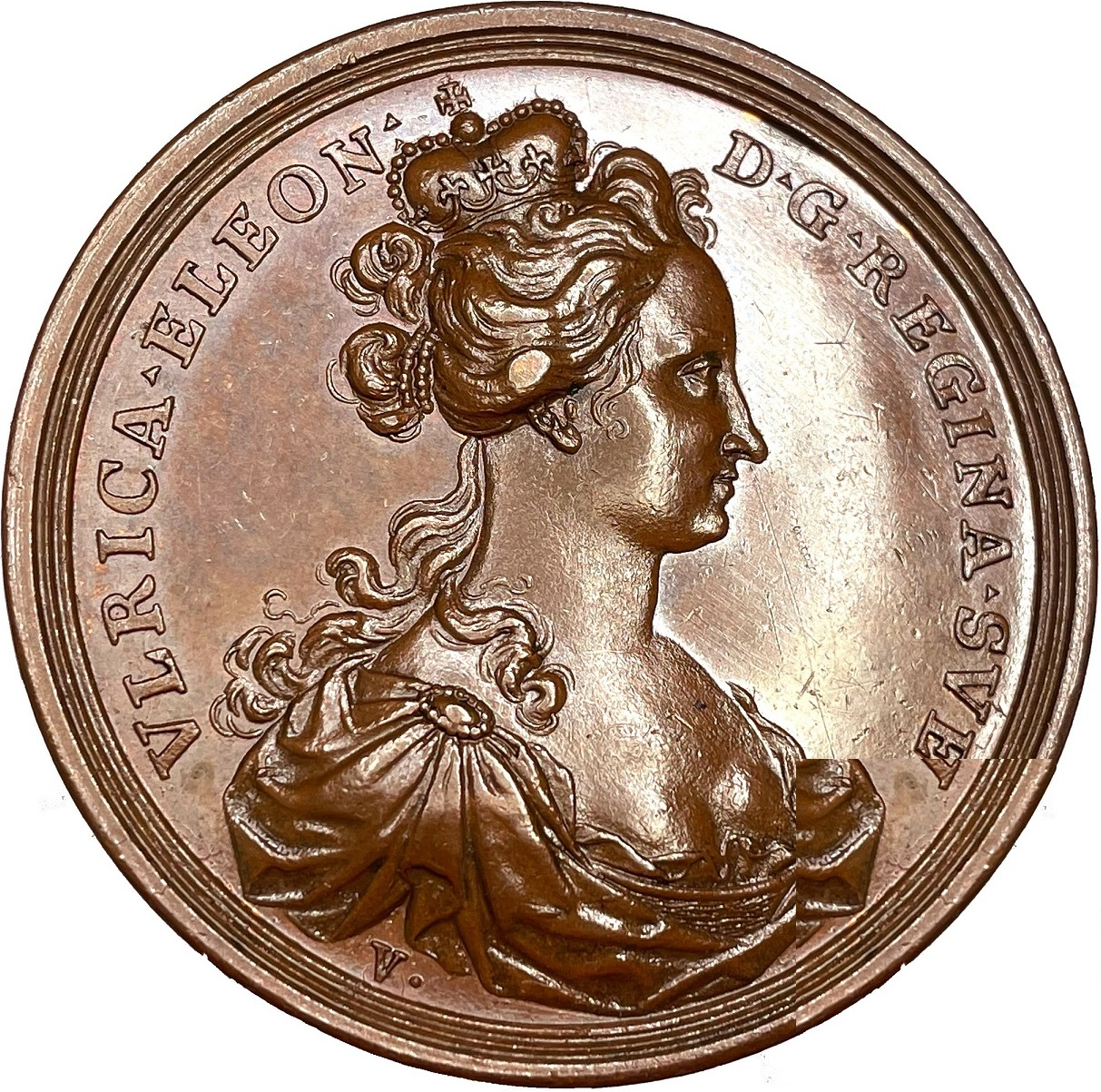
Medal for the coronation of Ulrica Eleanor as queen regnant in 1719

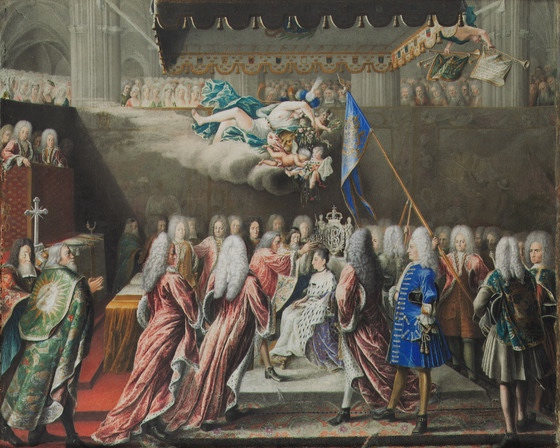
Coronation of Queen Ulrika Eleonora in 1719

On 5 December 1718, Ulrika Eleonora received the news of the death of her brother, Charles XII. It has never been claimed that she had any advance knowledge of the purported involvement of her husband's aide André Sicre, but she did immediately declare herself monarch in Uddevalla by stating that she had inherited the throne. The council was taken by surprise and did not contest this. She took control over the affairs of state and had Georg Heinrich von Görtz and his followers removed from power. The "Hesse Party" secured Ulrika Eleonora's succession to the throne. They gained the support of the Riksdag opposition, who wanted to end the absolute monarchy established in 1680 and reinstate parliamentary rule. On 15 December 1718, she declared that though she had inherited the throne, she did not intend to keep the Carolinian absolutism but agreed to reinstate the older system. The war council was determined to abolish absolutism and the right to inherit the throne, but was willing to acknowledge her as an elected monarch. Their opinion was supported by the majority of the Assembly of the Estates. Ulrika Eleonora was forced into agreeing to abolish absolute monarchy and the right to inherit the throne, both for her and for her contestant, her nephew Charles Frederick, Duke of Holstein-Gottorp. After having agreed to sign the new constitution as monarch, she was elected queen on 23 January 1719. On 19 February she signed the Instrument of Government (1719), thereby securing the support of the Estates not to give the throne to her nephew and competitor. She was crowned in Uppsala Cathedral 17 March 1719 and made her formal entrance into Stockholm as monarch on 11 April that same year. During the ceremonies in Stockholm, she received the Estates, who passed the throne in procession. On this occasion, she demonstrated that she knew who her followers were. When she received the nobility, she only allowed their representatives to kiss her hand with her glove on, while the other representatives were allowed to kiss her hand without the glove. Ulrika Eleonora never made the traditional journey through the country, the Eriksgata, on her own. Instead, she made it with Frederick in 1722, after his coronation.

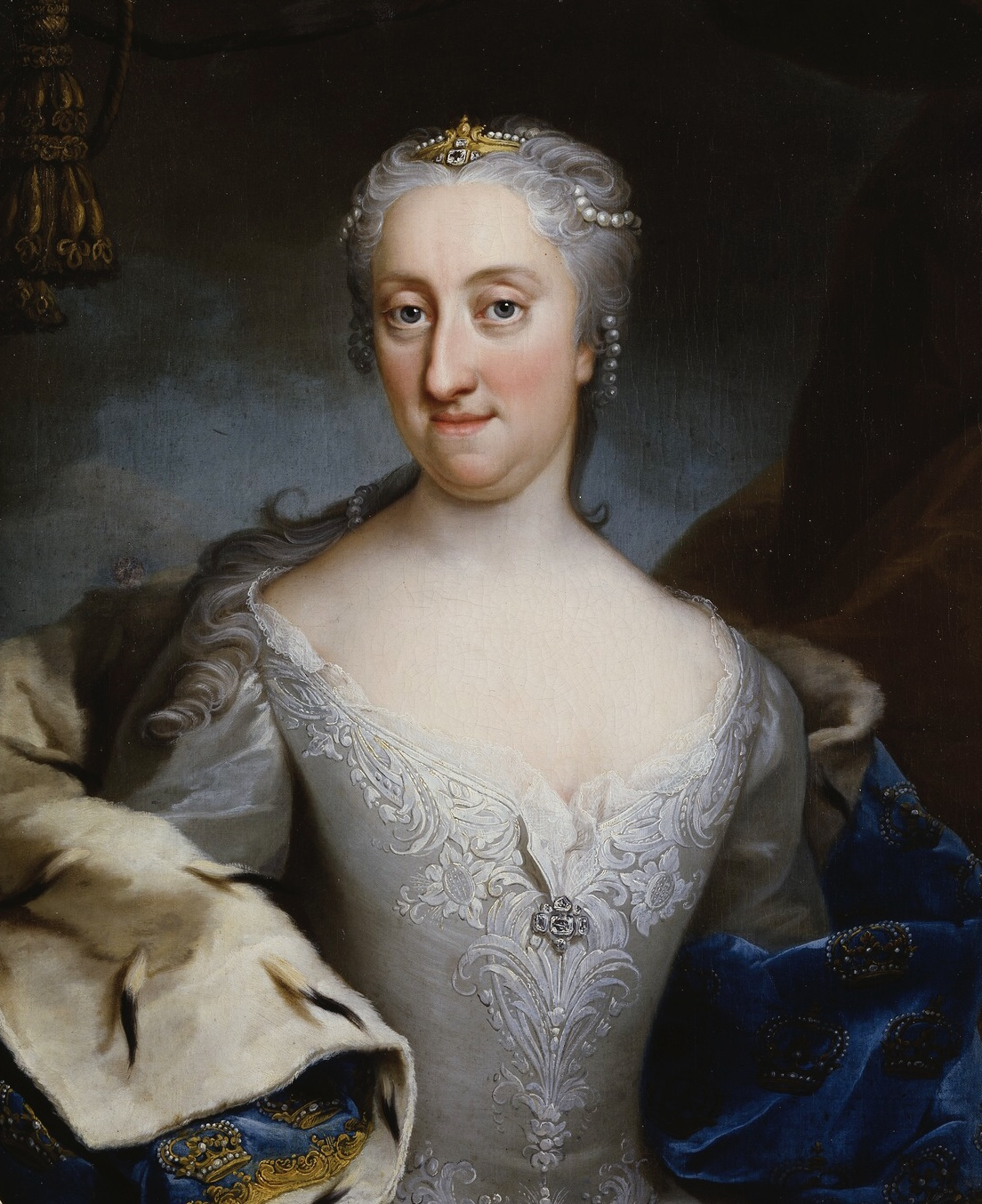
Portrait by Martin van Meytens, 1730

Her reign occurred just before the end of the Great Northern War. During the Russian Pillage of 1719–1721 in August of the summer of 1719, the Russian Fleet attacked the capital of Stockholm. Despite the ongoing attack, Ulrika Eleonora forced her courtiers to attend a previously accepted reception at the British ambassador's, "being so untouched as if there had been no enemies present for hundreds of miles", which was considered to be an impressive act of courage. Her favorite courtier was Emerentia von Düben (1669–1743), her old nurse, who had been ennobled and made lady-in-waiting in 1707 and with whom she had a close relationship all her life. Düben acted as her advisor, her comfort and her support, and was said to not have abused her influence – they were described as sisters. During her short reign, to secure support for her rule, she ennobled many families. In a period of fifteen months, she ennobled 181 people, more than any other monarch in Swedish history; one count, two barons and eight lesser noblemen every month. She had seven field marshals where her brother only ever had between three and five. Ulrika Eleonora was in fact in favour of an absolute monarchy. She had agreed to the new constitution only to secure the throne from her nephew, and her relations with the council were not good. She came into conflict with the president of the Privy Council Arvid Horn, who resigned in protest, as well as with his successor Gustaf Cronhielm. Horn criticized her for discussing state affairs with her husband, pressed her as to whether she would respect the constitution and insulted her by making the remark that nothing better was to be expected "under the regiment of a female." These conflicts had a deleterious effect on the war and state affairs.

Ulrika Eleonora supported the political ambitions of her consort, and from the beginning, she wished for him to become her co-monarch, in the fashion of William III and Mary II. However, this was not permitted by the Riksdag. One reason being that co-reigning had been forbidden in Sweden since the 15th century. There was also opposition in the Riksdag to the influence of Emerentia von Düben and her siblings over the affairs of state. Her difficulty in respecting the constitution and trouble in getting along with the Riksdag, as well as her way of continuously discussing state affairs with her husband, did however make the Riksdag willing to replace her with Frederick as sole monarch if she abdicated, an idea that had the support of Frederick. On 29 February 1720, after having again been denied a co-monarchy, Ulrika Eleonora abdicated in favour of her husband on the condition that she should succeed him if he should die before her. This condition of her abdication in fact granted her place as the heir to the Swedish throne until her death.

This succession was confirmed by the Riksdag. She often spoke of the abdication as the greatest sacrifice of her life. Frederick succeeded her on 24 March 1720.

== Queen consort ==
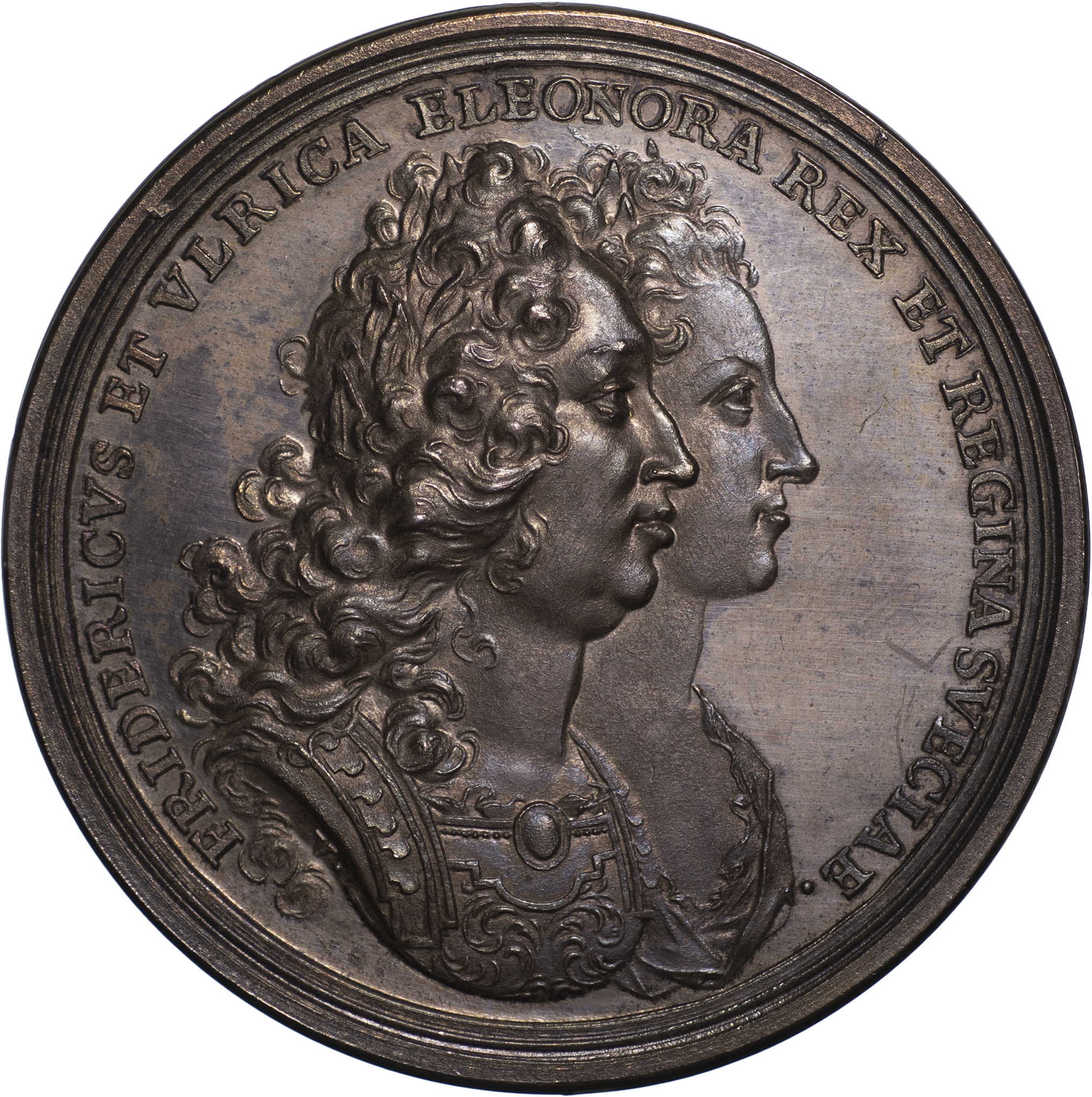
Medal for the coronation of Frederick in 1720

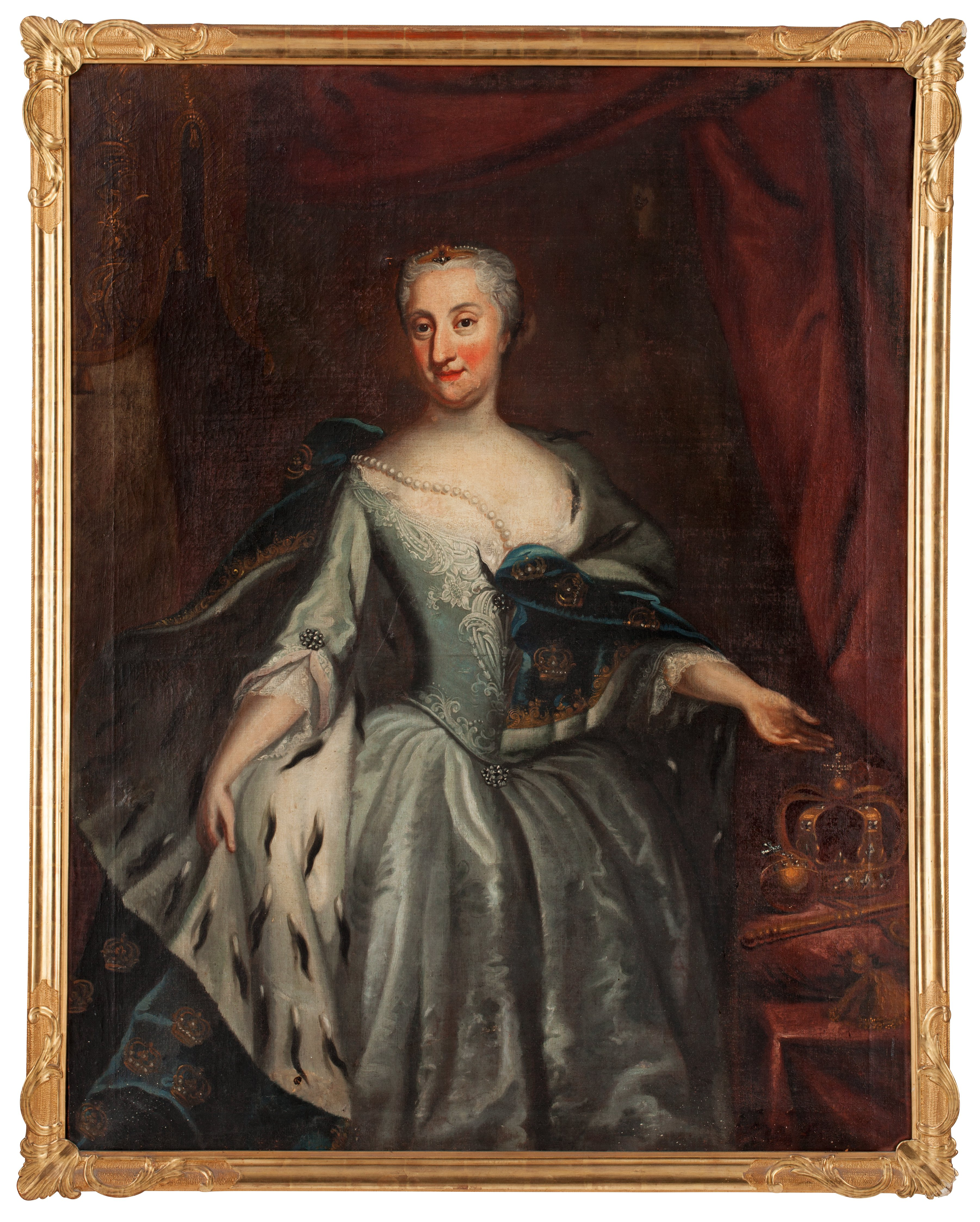
Georg Engelhard Schröder – Ulrika Eleonora, Queen of Sweden

The reign of her husband began the period traditionally known as the Age of Liberty, when the monarchy lost most of its power to a parliamentary system. As queen consort, she withdrew to private life. Ulrika Eleonora had married for love and was known to be fiercely loyal to Frederick. Initially, the relationship between Ulrika Eleonora and Frederick was described as a happy one, and before Frederick became monarch, he restricted himself to the role of her consort. After two miscarriages in 1715 and 1718 and at least until 1724, the Queen expressed hope that she would give birth to an heir, but ultimately her marriage was childless. King Frederick suggested placing his brother and his line in the House of Hesse in the succession line, and though this attempt was unsuccessful, Ulrika Eleonora supported this choice rather than her nephew the Duke of Holstein-Gottorp.

Queen Ulrika Eleonora enjoyed great popularity during the reign of her spouse, partly as the last member of the old royal house, and partly because of her personal piety. She was aware that this gave her power to influence policy, and when she let her opinion be known, it was often followed. This influence was recognized. During the Riksdag of 1738, for example, the queen expressed her displeasure when Carl Gustaf Tessin was due to be elected to a post, which resulted in public protests which did not quiet down until Tessin had been received at the Royal Palace and allowed to kiss the bare hand of the queen, who assured him that she had no intention of interfering.

The relationship between Ulrika Eleonora and Frederick changed after he became king, and it was said that when she gave him the crown, she gave him his freedom. King Frederick had mistresses, and his extramarital affairs increased after he lost much of his royal authority in 1723.

In 1734, Frederick became the first king in Swedish history to have an official mistress, the noblewoman Hedvig Taube, who was given the title Countess of Hessenstein. Ulrika Eleonora expressed her disapproval to her close confidant Emerentia von Düben, who convinced her never to display any public reaction to the affair, as it would be beneath the queen's dignity and her position was untouchable: "As the Moon travels along its course over the sky without bothering over the barks of dogs, so should Her Majesty despise the gossip, which has been unleashed by this much unfortunate and blinded commitment". By convincing Ulrika Eleonora not to publicly display her displeasure of his adultery, Emerentia von Düben also became favored by King Frederick. Ulrika Eleonora sternly followed the policy of not displaying her feelings about the adultery for years. At the beginning of the affair, on one occasion she even walked publicly with Hedvig Taube in her effort to defend the reputation of her husband.

During the Riksdag of 1738, the question of the king's adultery was raised by the clergy estate within the Riksdag of the Estates, and a letter of protest was presented to the king on 3 April 1739. The archbishop had already had a private conversation with the queen about the matter, during which the queen had lamented herself over the king's adultery and her disappointment of the Taube family. The clergy estate pointed to the oath made by the king in 1720, when he succeeded the queen on the Swedish throne after she abdicated in his favor, in which he had made the promise to: "love, honor and respect my most worthy consort, the all powerful Princess Ulrica Eleonora [...] and declare the Estates to be free of their oath of allegiance, should I ever break this oath and insurance", in fact declaring the king deposed if he disrespected the queen. On 26 April, the king expressed a wish to leave for Hesse. He was rumored to plan to settle there permanently with Taube. A rumor circulated of a planned coup d'etat by the queen's followers. The plan was to have the king leave with Taube, leaving the queen as regent of Sweden in his absence. After his departure, the queen's followers would present her with proof that the king had secretly married Taube, expecting the queen to respond by considering her marriage dissolved and agree to be reinstated as monarch. This planned coup never took place; the king never presented a request to leave for Hesse.

During the Riksdag of 1740–41, the question was raised again. At this point, a change had occurred in the queen's attitude, signs of which were observed already during the Riksdag of 1738. The policy of Ulrika Eleonora not to express her dislike of Frederick's adultery was weakened during her last years, possibly due to the unique position of Taube as the official mistress, because of the long-term nature of the affair and because they had children. Another reason for her change of conduct was reportedly that she, as an orthodox Lutheran, was concerned for the king's soul. Despite demonstrating her compassion with the other Riksråd deposed during the Riksdag of 1738, she smiled when the misfortune of the father of Hedvig Taube was mentioned. When hosting the wedding of her maid of honour Sigrid Bonde at court, she neglected to invite the Taube, Gylleborg and Sparre families (the last two known supporters of Hedvig Taube), although court protocol would have expected them to be included, and when the new Riksråd Carl Sparre, a known supporter of Taube, was presented to her during the audience for the new members of government, she demonstratively retired, preventing him from kissing her skirt in accordance with protocol. The discontent of Queen Ulrika Eleonora was not a small matter for the Riksdag; not only because of the queen's popularity, but also because the queen had abdicated in favour of the king on the condition that she would succeed him if he should die before her, a condition which made the queen the heir to the throne.

During the Riksdag of 1741, the matter of the king's adultery was, for the second time, raised in parliament by the clergy estate, this time by Bishop Erik Benzelius, who referred to the matter as that "which the Queen had made it known" that they should raise, in order to "set the mourning heart of the Queen to rest". An official statement of protest was made, stating a reminder of the king's oath always to treat the queen with respect when she abdicated in his favor, and that the whole kingdom was in mourning of the queen's sorrow, and concerned for the welfare of the king's soul. Two delegations from the clergy estate were appointed: one to the king, and one to Hedvig Taube. In July 1741, the statement was read to the king in his audience chamber. The king reacted with rage, refused to accept the statement and stated that the Riksdag of the Estates had promised him not to interfere in his private life. He was, on their second attempt, forced to receive the statement. When told the result of that audience with the king, the queen, Ulrika Eleonora insisted that the planned embassy to Hedvig Taube was also to be executed according to plan, and replied to the hesitation of the bishop with the words: "When you priests follow your calling and your conscience, you do well to do so with no concern of other matters." On this occasion, Hedvig Taube defended her by saying that she had never been aware of any negative reaction whatsoever from the Queen.

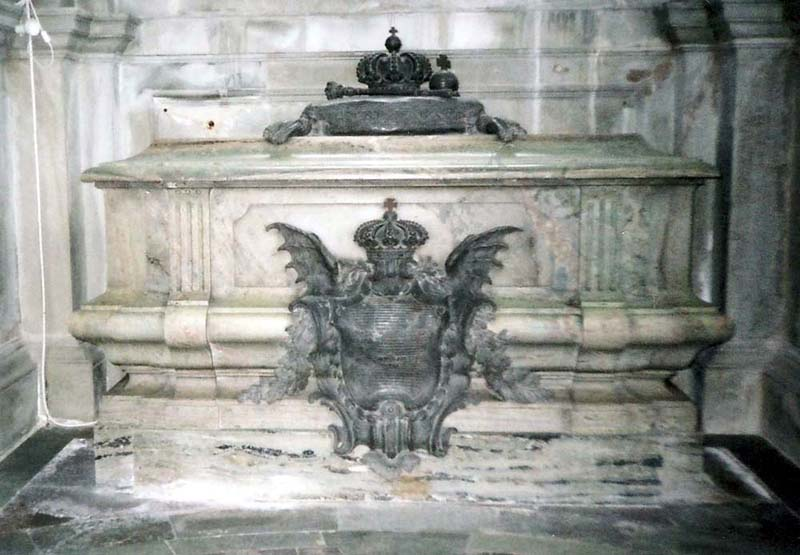
Ulrica Eleanor's sarcophagus in Riddarholm Church.

Ulrika Eleonora served as regent twice: The first time during Frederick's absence in 1731, and the second time during his illness in 1738–1739. She was declared regent in May 1731 when Frederick departed to visit Hesse, and ruled until his return in the autumn. In 1738, she was asked by the Estates to accept the regency at an occasion when Frederick was so ill that he was in danger of dying and was incapable of ruling. She duly accepted this task and handled the state affairs until after New Year's Eve 1738–39. During her second regency, she banned the newly founded Swedish theatre by refusing to extend their access to Bollhuset; her reason for this was opposition toward the theatre among the clergy. The theatre, however, was restored the following year.

Ulrika Eleonora was interested in jewelry and music. She enjoyed to participate in the dance at court balls, and though religious scruples made her conflicted in the issue, she also engaged German and French theatre companies to perform at Bollhuset. Intensely religious, she was capable of interrupting a parliamentary session to pray. Similarly, at court presentations, she could interrogate the female debutantes about the Bible, rewarding them for correct answers. Sternly maintaining her royal pride, she was known to simulate illness and decline to leave her quarters when she felt insulted. Her dependency upon Emerentia von Düben has often been mentioned, but she had several additional friends, among them Hedvig Mörner, as well as her childhood friend Anna Fleming, who was her lady-in-waiting for thirty years.

Queen Ulrika Eleonora died of smallpox in 1741. There were rumours that she had been poisoned, but these rumours were silenced when the marks of her illness were visible during her public lit de parade. As she had been the heir to the throne, her death marked the beginning of a succession crisis.

Ulrika Eleonora House of Palatinate-Zweibrücken Cadet branch of the House of Wittelsbach Born: 23 January 1688 Died: 24 November 1741
Regnal titles
Preceded by Charles XII	Queen regnant of Sweden; 1718–1720	Succeeded by Frederick I
Preceded by Charles XII	Duchess of Bremen and Verden; 1718–1719	Succeeded by George I
Royal titles
Preceded by Frederick of Hesse-Kassel as prince consort	Queen consort of Sweden; 1720–1741	Vacant Title next held by Louisa Ulrika of Prussia
Vacant Title last held by Maria Amalia of Courland	Landgravine consort of Hesse-Kassel; 1730–1741	Vacant Title next held by Mary of Great Britain
