= Viktor von Düben =

Swedish baron, estate owner

Freiherr Viktor von Düben
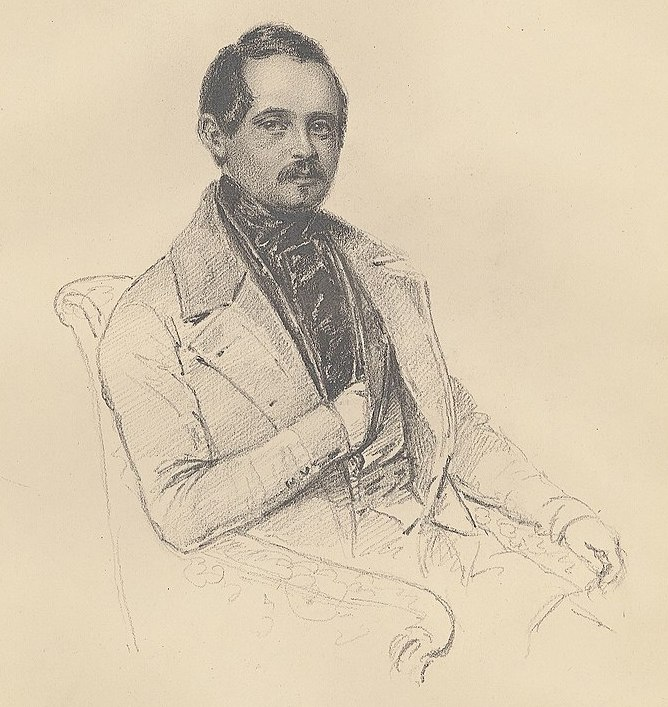
- Portrait by Maria Röhl in 1847.
- Full name: Baron Henrik Viktor Knut von Düben
- Born: 21 October 1818; Stockholm, Sweden
- Died: 21 August 1867 (aged 48); Kägleholm, Sweden
- Noble family: von Düben
- Spouses: Lotten von Düben, Baroness of Kägleholm (m. 1849; died 1867) (née Tersmeden)
- Father: Anders Gustaf von Düben
- Mother: Carolina Maria Eckhardt
- Occupation: Lieutenant, estate owner, politician

Baron Henrik Viktor Knut von Düben von Düben (21 October 1818 – 21 August 1867) was a Swedish peer, politician, lieutenant, estate owner, second great-grandson of organist and composer Gustaf Düben.

== Early life ==
Viktor von Düben was born on 21 October 1818 at Bollstanäs in Stockholm, Sweden, to Carolina Maria von Düben (née Eckhardt) and Anders Gustaf von Düben. The fourth child in a Noble family, he had two sisters and three brothers, among others writer Cesar von Düben. Carolina Maria was born in Swedish Pomerania, thus of German descent, while Anders Gustaf had Dutch, French, German and Scottish ancestry. Both his father and his grandfather was closely linked to the Royal Court of Sweden. His father was a prominent courtier and close friend of Gustav, Prince of Vasa, and his grandfather Henrik Jakob von Düben was a hofmarschall.

== Career ==
Von Düben was educated at Military Academy Karlberg, where he graduated as a cadet. In 1844 he became a lieutenant in Uppsala. In 1855 he shouldered his father-in-law Carl Reinhold Tersmeden as the estate owner of Kägleholm. Thereby, he became baron of Kägleholm.

Von Düben served as a politician at the House of Nobility. His term ended with the abolishment of the old governing system in 1866, in which the nobility had a stronger presence in terms of authority.

Von Düben founded a marksman association in Ödeby in 1865.

Von Düben was elected the first chairperson of Ödeby's Municipal Board.

Von Düben made several donations to the Karolinska Elementarläroverket in Örebro in 1860 and 1863. The donations were made up of collections of books, coins and several medals. In 1862 he made donations to Finnish people in need as the Great Famine of the 1860s had struck Finland.

== Family ==
In 1849 he married Hedvig Charlotta Tersmeden, daughter to first cousins; reformist Carl Reinhold Tersmeden and Gustava, née Tersmeden, with whom he had five children, out of which three girls survived until adulthood.

Political offices
New title	Chairman of Ödeby's Municipal Board; 1862–1867	Succeeded by
