= Charlotta Elisabeth van der Lith =

Surinamese plantation owner

Charlotta Elisabeth van der Lith (21 November 1700 in The Hague – 5 August 1753 in Paramaribo), was a plantation owner in Dutch Surinam; married to three governors in 1724–1737 and the leader of the opposition party of the settlers, Cabale, in 1742–1753.

== Life ==
Daughter of the Lutheran priest Diederich van der Lith (1660–1723) professor of philosophy, and Elisabeth Baldina Helvetius (1679–1748). Married in 1722 to Hendrik Temminck (1680–1727) governor in Surinam; in 1729 to Charles Emilius Hendrik de Cheusses, (1702–1734), governor in Surinam; in 1737 to Joan Raye (1698–1737), governor in Surinam; in 1742 to Antoine Audra, priest; and in 1748 in Paramaribo to priest Martin Louis Duvoisin (d. 1751).

Lith became a successful planter through the plantation she inherited from her father. She remained in the governor's residence after the death of her first two spouses and every time married the new governor upon his arrival. From 1742, she acted as the leader of the Cabale party, created by the Dutch colonists, leading the opposition against governor Jan Jacob Mauricius; in 1747, Cabale party under the leadership of "the famous madame du Voisin" appointed the lawyer Solomon du Plessis (1705–1785), father of Susanna du Plessis, to speak for them in the Netherlands, which led to the deposition of Mauricius in 1751.
