= Joachim von Düben the Younger =

Swedish politician

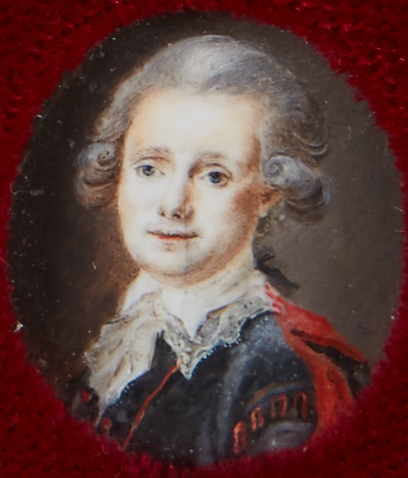
- Portrait by unknown painter, c. 1785

President of Privy Council Chancellery of Sweden
- Tenure: 1772
- Successor: Ulrik Scheffer
- Born: 1708; Stockholm, Sweden
- Died: 27 January 1786 (aged 77–78); Stockholm, Sweden
- Noble family: Düben family
- Spouse: Catharina Eleonora Temminck
- Issue: Fredrika Eleonora
- Father: Anders von Düben the Younger
- Mother: Ulrika Friedenreich

Joachim von Düben the Younger (Swedish: Joachim von Düben den yngre; 21 October 1708 – 27 January 1786) was a Swedish statesman and riksråd.

== Early life ==
Born in Stockholm, Sweden, into the Düben family renowned for its contributions to classical music, he held the title of Freiherr, and was a half-brother of Henrik Jakob von Düben. He entered the world as the son of the composer Anders von Düben the Younger and Ulrica Friedenreich. Besides Swedish, he had Dutch and German ancestry.

== Political career ==
Düben was elected as President of Privy Council Chancellery of Sweden in 1772, and was fired following the Coup of Gustav III.

Düben was initially close to the court, in 1762 came into fierce conflict with Fredrik Carl Sinclair, his favored competitor who held the queen's trust. He now slipped increasingly towards the Caps and was, as an apostate, extremely hated by his former like-minded people. Several times he was stopped by the monarchy when proposing a national council.

After an amendment to the constitution in 1766 which enabled the Riksdag to overcome such royal opposition, he was finally appointed to the Riksråd in 1766. However, he lost this task at the change of government after the victory of the Hats in 1769.

Re-elected to the Riksdag in 1772, as Chancellor and last head of government of the Age of Liberty, he was dismissed after Gustav III's coup and thereafter without political influence.

== Family ==
In 1738, von Düben married Catharina Eleonora Temminck, daughter of Governor-General of the Dutch colony of Surinam, Hendrik Temminck. They had six children, including the headmistress and artist Fredrika Eleonora von Düben. He then remarried to Cornelia Florentina Hildebrand.

During the 2024–2025 renovation of Botkyrka Church in Botkyrka, a previously unknown burial vault was discovered, containing the remains of Joachim von Düben the Younger among other members of his family.

== Sources ==
- Anrep, Gabriel (1858). Svenska adelns ättar-taflor (in Swedish). P. A. Norstedt u. Söhne.
- Hildebrand, Bengt (1945). "Düben, Düben von, släkt" (in Swedish). National Archives of Sweden. p. 634.

Political offices
Preceded by	President of Privy Council Chancellery of Sweden; 1772	Succeeded by Ulrik Scheffer
