= Ekman family =

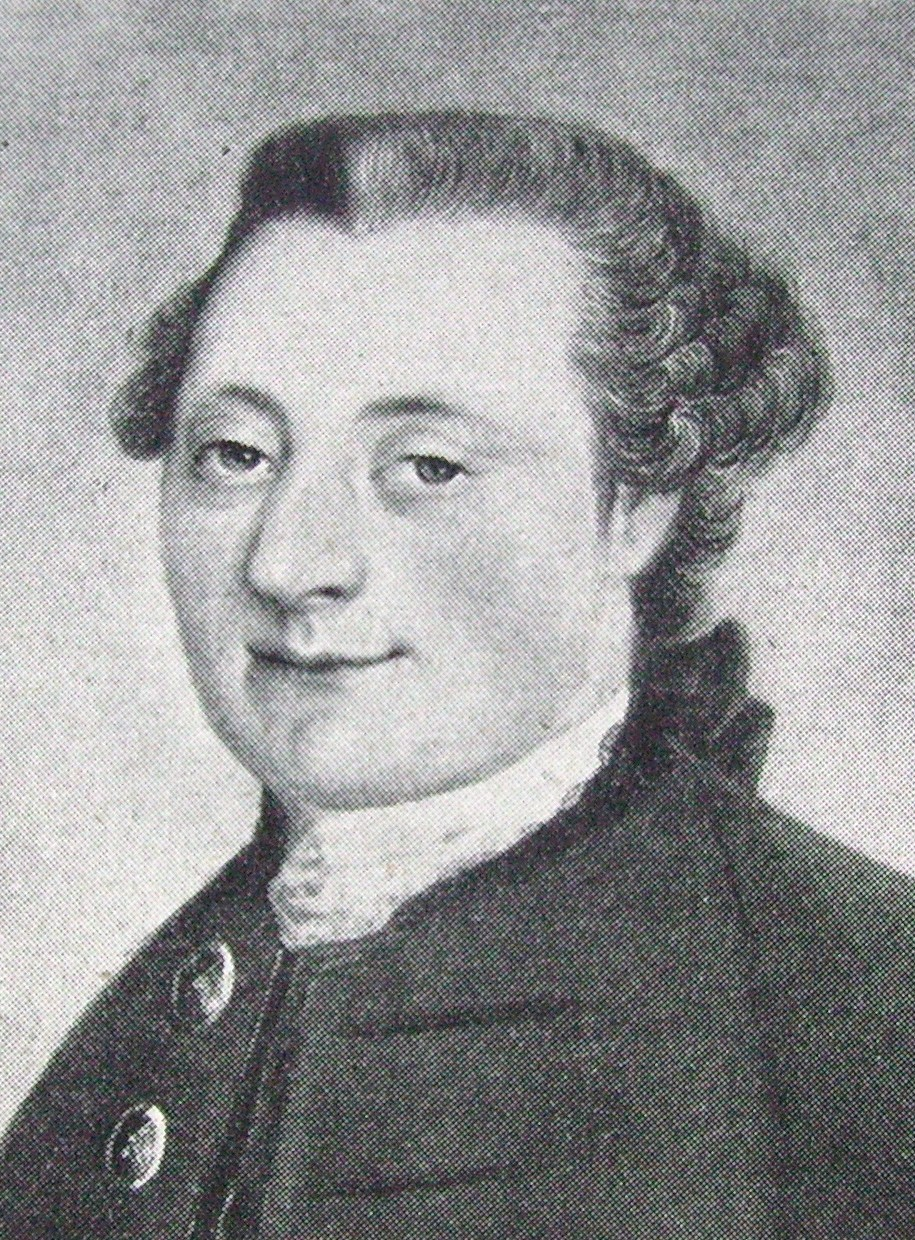
Peter Petersson Ekman III (1740–1807), merchant

The Ekman family played an important role in the Industrialization of Sweden during the 18th and the 19th century. Its family members owned iron mines and mills, paper mills, sugar mills, railroads, channels, manufacturing companies, and banks. The hub of the business activities was Ekman & Co.

Large donations from the family during the early 20th century led to the establishment of the School of Business, Economics and Law (now part of the University of Gothenburg) and the Ekman Hospital (Ekmanska sjukhuset).

The family still remains active in Swedish business.

== Ekman & Co ==
Ekman & Co is a Swedish trading house, that was founded in 1802 in Gothenburg, Sweden. It is one of the oldest, still existing companies in Sweden.

During the Swedish industrialization the company sold and shipped large quantities of iron, pulp and paper from Gothenburg to Europe. The trading house also worked as a bank, playing an important role in financing the Swedish basic industry. The company was one of the co-founders of Skandinaviska Banken. Today Ekman & Co sells pulp and paper. The annual sales of the company are 1,7 billion USD. Ekman & Co is still owned by the Ekman family.

== Sources ==
- Oscar Mannström (red); Oscar Ekman - en minnesbok 1812-1907, P A Norstedt & Söner, Stockholm 1922
- Arne Munthe, fil dr; Släkten Ekman - Handelshuset Ekman & Co:s föregångare, John Antonssons Boktryckeri, Göteborg 1958
- Svenska släktkalendern 1962, red. fil lic Torsten Dahl, Albert Bonniers Förlag, Stockholm 1962 s. 178–185
- Sveriges dödbok 1947-2003, (CD-ROM version 3.0), utgiven av Sveriges Släktforskarförbund 2005
- Göteborgare, [andra samlingen], kammarherre Magnus Lagerberg, Åhlén & Åkerlunds Förlag, Ernfried Nybergs Boktryckeri, Stockholm 1914 s. 160 >>
- Det gamla Göteborg: lokalhistoriska skildringar, personalia och kulturdrag - staden i väster, Första delen, C R A Fredberg (1921), Faksimil med omfattande kommentarer och tillägg, Sven Schånberg, Arvid Flygare, Bertil Nyberg, Walter Ekstrands Bokförlag 1977 ISBN 91-7408-015-6 s. 861
- Svenska släktkalendern 1914, Gustaf Elgenstierna, Albert Bonniers Förlag, Stockholm 1913 s. 178
- Släkten Ekman : Handelshuset Ekman & Co:s föregångare, fil dr Arne Munthe, utgiven av Ekman & Co, Göteborg 1958
- Ekman & co
