= Edvard von Düben =

Swedish baron, photographer, pharmacist and lieutenant

Freiherr Edvard von Düben

Swedish vice-consul to Salina Cruz
- Tenure: 1910–1923
- Successor: Herman Gagstätter
- Full name: Edvard Vilhelm von Düben
- Born: 16 August 1865; Ljusne, Sweden
- Died: 4 March 1930 (aged 64); Salina Cruz, Oaxaca, Mexico
- Noble family: Düben family
- Spouse: Raymunda Sánchez
- Father: Carl Gustaf von Düben
- Mother: Amelie Westerberg

Edvard Vilhelm von Düben or Eden (16 August 1865 – 4 March 1930) was a Swedish consul, pharmacist, lieutenant and photographer.

== Early life ==
Edvard von Düben was born on 16 August 1865, in Ljusne, Sweden, into the Düben family. His parents were Amelie and Carl Gustaf Wilhelm von Düben. He was the grandson of Anders Gustaf von Düben and the youngest of their four children. He lived in Landskrona before leaving Sweden, where his family hosted the famous Swedish author Selma Lagerlöf at Storgatan 10.

== Career ==
In the 19th century, Düben established a photography enterprise in Landskrona, Scania. He later became a lieutenant in the Brazilian army and operated a book-printing venture in Sorocaba, São Paulo.

Following his time in Brazil, Düben journeyed to Mexico where he set up chemical-technical enterprise. This business thrived initially in Salina Cruz and later in San Jerónimo, Oaxaca. Düben was appointed as the Swedish vice-consul in Salina Cruz in 1910.

In 1917, he married with Raymunda Sánchez.

== Sources ==
- Enander, Christer (18 March 2010). "Brev skildrar Selmas liv". Kristianstadsbladet (in Swedish).
- Elgenstierna, Gustaf Magnus (1926). Den introducerade svenska adelns ättartavlor med tillägg och rättelser (in Swedish). P.A. Norstedt.
- Palm, Anna-Karin (16 August 2019). Jag vill sätta världen i rörelse: En biografi över Selma Lagerlöf (in Swedish). Albert Bonniers Förlag. ISBN 978-91-0-017988-5.
- Paulin, Axel (1951). Svenska öden i Sydeamerika (in Swedish). Norstedt.
- Sveriges statskalender (in Swedish). Almmanna Förlaget. 1912.
