= Ingeborg Walberg =

Swedish missionary

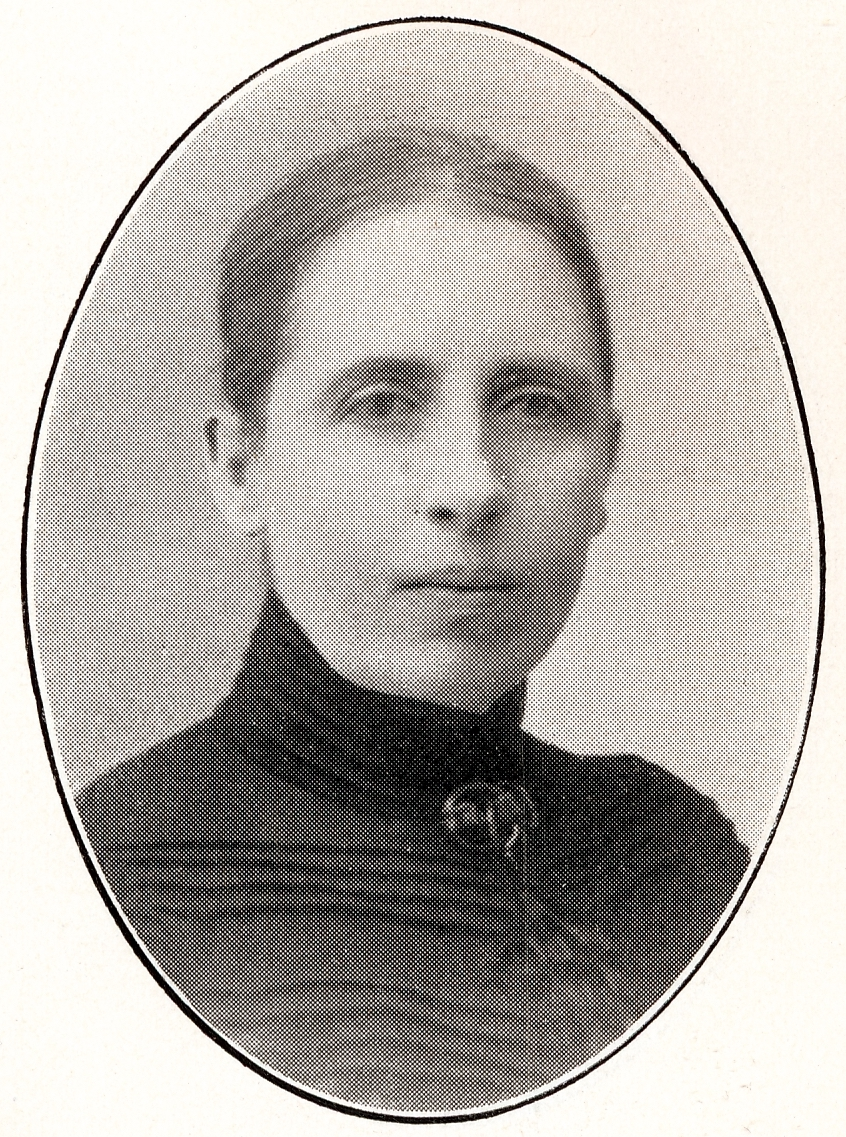
- Ingeborg Walberg
- Born: Karolina Ingeborg Emerentia von Düben; 12 December 1862; Överselö, Södermanland County, Sweden
- Died: 17 March 1943 (aged 80); Gränna, Jönköping County, Sweden
- Occupation: Missionary
- Parent(s): Cesar von Düben; Augusta Lilliestråle

Ingeborg Walberg (Note: The name can also be spelled as Wahlberg.) (née von Düben; (Note: Name prior to her marriage: Karolina Ingeborg Emerentia von Düben (Swedish pronunciation: [ˈfɔn dy:ʹbən]).) 6 December 1862 – 17 March 1943) was a Swedish missionary to South Africa.

== Early life ==
Ingeborg Walberg was born a baroness (Swedish: friherrinna) on Stora Lundby in 1862 in Överselö, Södermanland. Her father, Cesar von Düben, was a pioneering photographer and a member of the Düben family, renowned for its contributions to Swedish music history. Her mother, Augusta Lilliestråle, belonged to the Lilliestråle family and was also a writer.

Walberg was the granddaughter of Anders Gustaf von Düben, one of the last two Swedes to be sentenced to exile.

== Missionary work ==
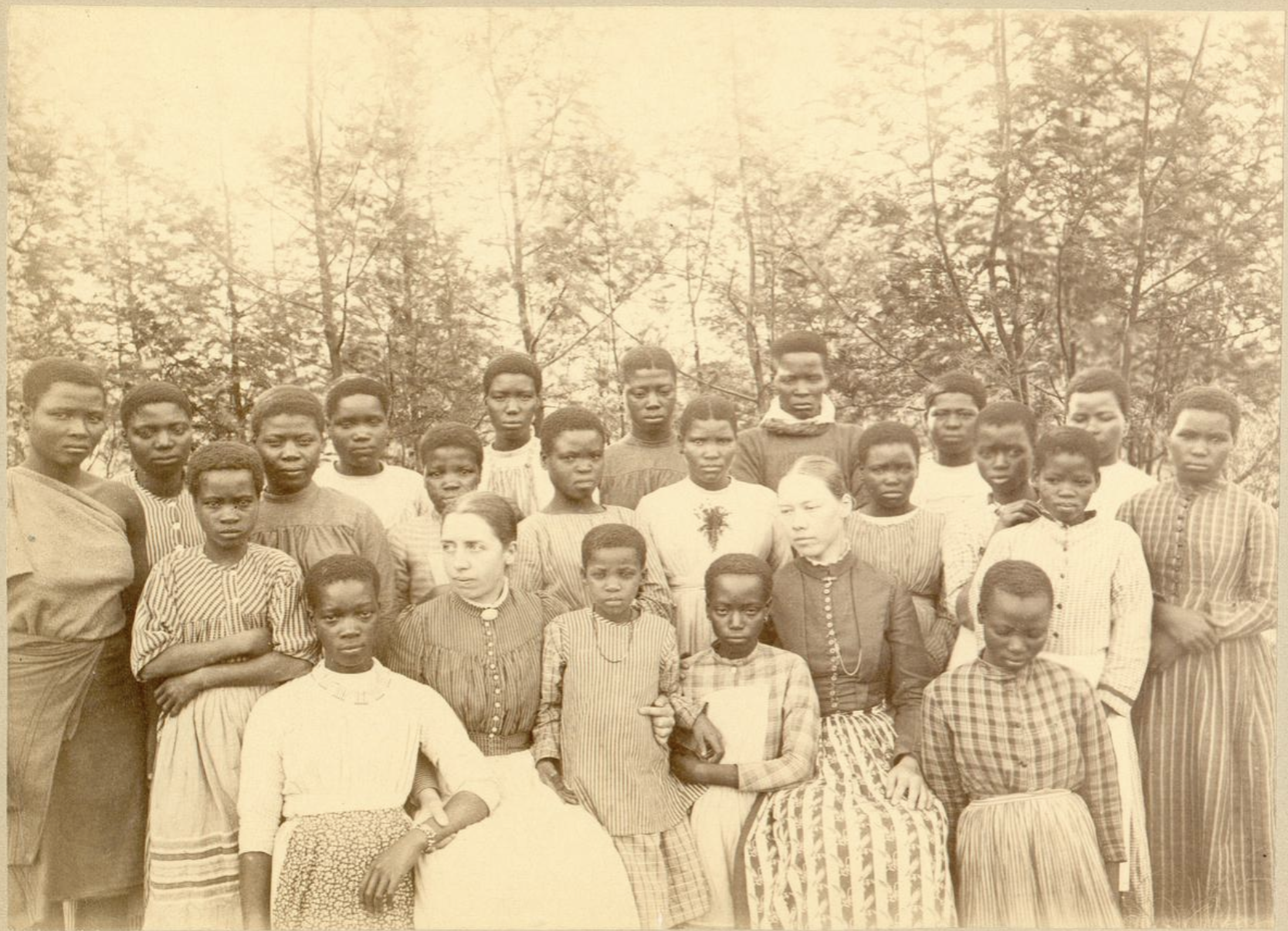
Ingeborg Walberg, together with Hedvig Posse, among the missionary students in South Africa.

Walberg was elected by Svenska kyrkans mission in January 1890, serving the Church of Sweden, after she had left her role as private tutor for the children of the Witts family.

Walberg arrived in Ekutuleni in October 1892 to work at the Missionary Center in Ekutuleni, Natal, and to assist missionary Fristedt, in his work with education and the orphanage's activities.

In addition to her work as a missionary, she also collected several ethnographical objects. Which she later donated to the Swedish Museum of Natural History.

Walberg married Erik Gustaf Walberg (1859–1915) in 1897, a priest and missionary at the Oskarsberg Missionary Center in Ekutuleni.
