= Simone Vesi =

Italian Baroque composer

- Born: 1610; Forli, Italy
- Died: 1667-1668
- Known for: Liturgical music
- Style: Baroque music

Simon (or Simone) Vesi (1610–1667 or 1668) was an Italian composer and cleric in Padua. His surviving works are almost all settings of psalms, the Mass and other liturgical works.

== Biography ==
Simone Vesi was born in Forlì in northern Italy around 1610. His name is spelled in his printed editions variously as Simon, Simone or Simeone, and in one publication in the Latinate form Simone Vesius.

His first known appointment was as maestro di cappella at the cathedral church of Forli, mentioned in the dedication to his Opus 3 motetti. Perhaps indicating a job application, his Opus 1 'Messi e salmi' of 1646 is dedicated to Carlo Rossetti, who had been consecrated bishop of Faenza three years earlier. Vesi entered Padua Cathedral in 1648 as a tenor and spent the rest of his known career in Padua, where he was employed by Padua Cathedral first as a tenor and then as a chaplain. Vesi unsuccessfully applied to be maestro di cappella at the cathedral, but did take on additional duties running the private chapel of Giorgio Cornaro (cardinal), the bishop of Padua.

Vesi's music was included in two contemporary anthologies, the Sacra Corona of 1656 (published in Venice) and the 1659 collection by Johannes Havemann of mostly Italian music entitled Geistlicher Concerten. Records indicate that Vesi's own publications were in libraries outside Italy during his own lifetime, and manuscript copies made by others exist in other collections including the Düben collection in Uppsala. Vesi was also mentioned alongside Monteverdi, Carissimi and other composers in the stile concertato in Severo Bonini's treatise on contemporary music, the Discorsi e regole (1649–50).

He retired from his posts at Padua Cathedral in 1667. His date of death is unknown.

== Music ==
There were six publications of Vesi's music during his lifetime, of which five contain settings of liturgical texts. Each publication was produced by the prolific Venetian publishing house of Gardano. Most of his works are motets and settings of the Psalms for the service of Vespers. The music ranges from settings for single voice with continuo to works for double choir, instruments (most commonly two violins) and organ (which includes basso continuo figures). His musical style is typical of Italian church music in the stile concertato of the second half of the 17th-century, with alternating sections of solo recitative-like florid vocal writing and polyphonic or homophonic choral sections.

By contrast, his Opus 5 publication "Le Mascherate" is a sequence of seven madrigals with an introductory 'dialogue', dedicated to the Paduan music and instrument collector Andrea Mantova. The musical style is a departure from Vesi's liturgical music, with conversational dialogue between the different characters. The texts of the seven madrigals are by an unknown librettist, while the introductory dialogue borrows its text from an opera libretto by contemporary Venetian librettist, Pietr'Angelo Zaguri.

For his Opus 6 collection, Vesi uses mainly homophonic style, with no instruments other than organ continuo, and almost none of the virtuosi soloistic and ornamented writing that characterises his earlier music.

== Works ==
- Missa e salmi for 6 voices, instruments and continuo [Op. 1]. (Venice, 1646)
- Motetti e salmi Op. 2 for solo voice, instruments and continuo (Venice, 1648)
- Motetti Op. 3 for solo voice and continuo (Venice, 1652)
- Salmi concertati Op. 4 for 3-6 voices, second chorus, instruments and continuo (Venice, 1656)
- Le Mascherate Op. 5 for 4 voices, 2 violins and continuo (Venice, 1660)
- Salmi ariosi Op 6. for 8 voices and continuo (Venice, 1663)
- Individual works by Vesi appear in other contemporary publications, and in the Düben collection of manuscript transcriptions held at Uppsala University
