= Andreas Oswald =

German organist and composer

Andreas Oswald (also: Johann Andreas Uswalt or Ußwaldt, baptised 9 December 1634 in Weimar – 1665 in Eisenach) was a German organist and composer of the baroque period.

== Life ==
Born in Weimar, Andreas Oswald was the son of Andreas Oswald Sr., who was the court organist there. In 1643, it is presumed that he moved to Eisenach where his father had gained the position of town organist. At the age of 15, Andreas Jr. was hired as court organist in Weimar, the position which his father had once held. Thus, he was one of Johann Sebastian Bach's predecessors. After the court orchestra was disbanded in 1662, forced to seek employment elsewhere, Oswald obtained the position as town organist in Eisenach, succeeding his father who had recently died. Although employed as an organist, he obtained a reputation in Eisenach as a virtuoso performer on the violin and other instruments. He remained in Eisenach until his death in 1665, aged 30. He was succeeded by Johann Christoph Bach, the uncle of Johann Sebastian Bach.

We owe the survival of all but one of Oswald's surviving works to the efforts of Jakob Ludwig, who in 1662, compiled the Partiturbuch Ludwig, a manuscript of 100 instrumental works as a birthday gift to his employer Duke August II of Braunschweig-Wolfenbüttel. With seventeen pieces included in the manuscript, he is the most represented composer in the collection.

His Aria Variata included in Partiturbuch Ludwig, based on a song-like melody, can be counted among the significant German Trio Sonatas of the period.

== Works ==
- Sonata for 3 violins and continuo, manuscript in the Düben collection of Uppsala University Library.

Works in Partiturbuch Ludwig, with the number under which they appear in that collection:

- Sonata in E minor for violin and continuo (No.4)
- Sonata in D major for violin and continuo (No.6)
- Aria Variata in A major for violin (in scordatura), viola da gamba and continuo (No.45)
- Sonata in G major for violin, viola da gamba and continuo (No.48)
- Sonata in A minor for 2 violins and continuo (No.49)
- Sonata in A minor for violin, viola da gamba or trombone, and continuo (No.52)
- Aria Variata in D minor for 2 violins and continuo (No.54)
- Sonata in D major for violin, viola, viola da gamba and continuo (No.60)
- Sonata in A major for violin, trombone, bassoon and continuo (No.62)
- Sonata in G major for 2 violins, viola da gamba and continuo (No.68)
- Sonata in F major for violin, viola da gamba, trombone and continuo (No.70)
- Sonata in C major for violin, trombone, bassoon and continuo (No.71)
- Sonata in D major for violin, 2 violas, bassoon and continuo (No.81)
- Sonata in D major for violin, trombone, bassoon and continuo (No.109)
- Sonata in D major for violin, trombone, bassoon and continuo (No.111)
- Sonata in D major for 2 violins, viola da gamba and continuo (No.112)
- Sonata in E minor for violin, trombone, viola da gamba and continuo (No.113)

== Bibliography ==
- Michael Fuerst: CD Booklet Andreas Oswald: Sonaten, Chelycus-Ensemble, Organum
- Almut Jedicke: Andreas Oswald (1634–1665): Sonaten; Chelycus, Organum Classics Ogm 261036 in Die Tonkunst online, Rubrik Schalltrichter, Ausgabe 0608, 1. August 2006 (Online Version)
- Wolfgang Lidke: Weimar, Musik in Geschichte und Gegenwart 1, Bd. 14, Kassel 1968, Sp. 392
