= Johann Heinrich Eckhardt =

Johann Heinrich Eckhardt may refer to:

- Johann Heinrich Eckhardt (typographer), German publisher
- Johann-Heinrich Eckhardt, German military personnel
