= Gunilla von Düben =

Swedish baroness, writer and translator (1846–1923)

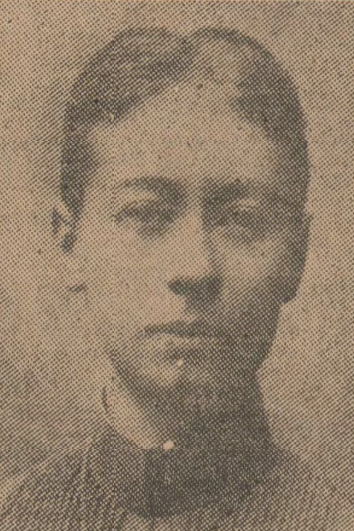
- Full name: Gunilla Antoinetta von Düben
- Other names: Gulli
- Born: 17 February 1862; Brännkyrka, Stockholm, Sweden
- Died: 4 May 1923 (aged 61); Stockholm, Sweden
- Noble family: Düben family
- Occupation: Teacher; Translator; Writer

Gunilla "Gulli" Antoinetta von Düben (17 February 1862 – 4 May 1923) was a Swedish teacher, translator, writer.

== Early life ==
Gunilla von Düben was born on 17 February 1862, in Brännkyrka, south of Stockholm, Sweden, into the Düben family, renowned for its contributions to classical music. She held the title of Freifrau and was the daughter of Adamina von Vegesack and August von Düben, a mechanical engineer. Her grandfathers were Anders Gustaf von Düben on her father's side, and Johan Fredrik Ernst von Vegesack on her mother's side.

== Career ==
In 1896, she completed her studies at the Royal Seminary and became a qualified teacher. She also held the position of stiftsjungfru, which was an unmarried female noble supported by an allowance from a foundation of unmarried noblewomen until she married. During the early 20th century, Düben translated books into Swedish and authored her own works as well. In 1916, she released her book "The Dream of Point Loma." Her translations covered topics related to humanism, spirituality, and religion, including the translation of the "Book of Enoch", and the "Les Déracinés" into Swedish. Furthermore, she played a role as a co-author for the weekly Swedish magazine "Idun," which was published in the same period.

== Personal life ==
Düben was a friend, as well as relative of renown writer Verner von Heidenstam. She had no issue and did not end up marrying.

== Works ==
=== Publications ===
- Düben, Gunilla von (1904). Hon, som aldrig gjorde någon ledsen (in Swedish).
- Düben, Gunilla von (1916). Drömmen om Point Loma: ett år i Katherine Tingleys tjänst (in Swedish). Fr. Skoglund i distribution.
- Düben, Gunilla von; Minckwitz, Marie von (1922). Söndagsbarnet: en ny bilderbok (in Swedish). Sv. bokhandelscentralen.

=== Translations ===
- Book of Enoch (1901)
- Zur Diätetik der Seele by Ernst, Baron von Feuchtersleben (1911)
- Les Déracinés by Maurice Barrès (1916)

== Sources ==
- Böök, Fredrik (1935). Europeisk litteratur, 1870-1914 (in Swedish). Bonnier.
- Gedin, Per I. (2013). Verner von Heidenstam : ett liv: Ett liv (in Swedish). Albert Bonniers Förlag. ISBN 978-91-0-013281-1.
- Gullberg, Helge (1983). Gullebarns levnadssage: Verner von Heidenstam[s] och Ellen Belfrages son, föräldrarna och gudmodern studerade i samtida dokument (in Swedish).
- Lewenhaupt, Claës C:son (1922). Sveriges Ridderskaps och Adels Kalender 1923 (in Swedish). Stockholm: Albert Bonniers förlag.
