= Düben family =

Swedish noble family of classical musicians

Düben
- Swedish noble family
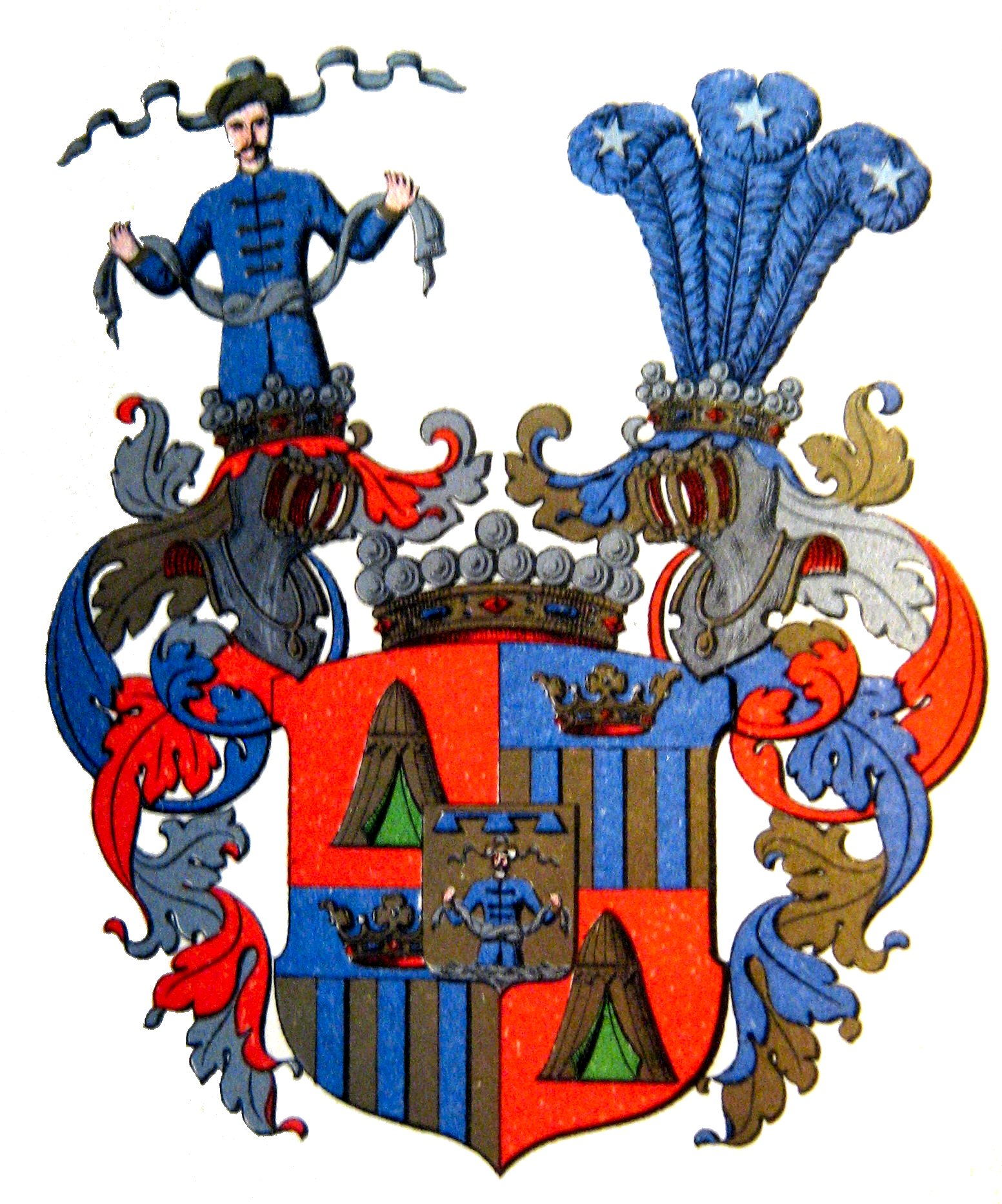
- Coat of arms granted to the von Düben family, No. 139.
- Country: Sweden
- Current region: Mexico, Sweden and United States
- Origin: Holy Roman Empire (present-day Germany)
- Titles: Freiherr, Count
- Traditions: Baroque music

The Düben family (German pronunciation: [ˈdyːbm̩]) is a noble family of German descent, originating in Saxony, Holy Roman Empire, whose members were elevated to the Swedish nobility, that rose to prominence with Andreas Düben (c. 1597–1662), an organist to the German Church in Stockholm, Swedish Empire.

During the 17th century, the Düben family exerted a significant influence on music at the Royal Court Orchestra, which experienced a golden age during those years. The family collected and composed various works, resulting in a compilation known as the Düben collection. Gustaf Düben, the son of Andreas Düben, was responsible for compiling this collection.

Its members use different surnames; the ennobled individuals and their descendants incorporate a nobiliary particle, "von," into their surnames, as seen in "von Düben" (German pronunciation: [fɔnˈdyːbm̩]), while the un-ennobled members do not include this particle in their surnames.

== Overview ==
The Düben family progenitor, Michael Düben, was an advisor (German: Ratsverwandter) in Lützen.

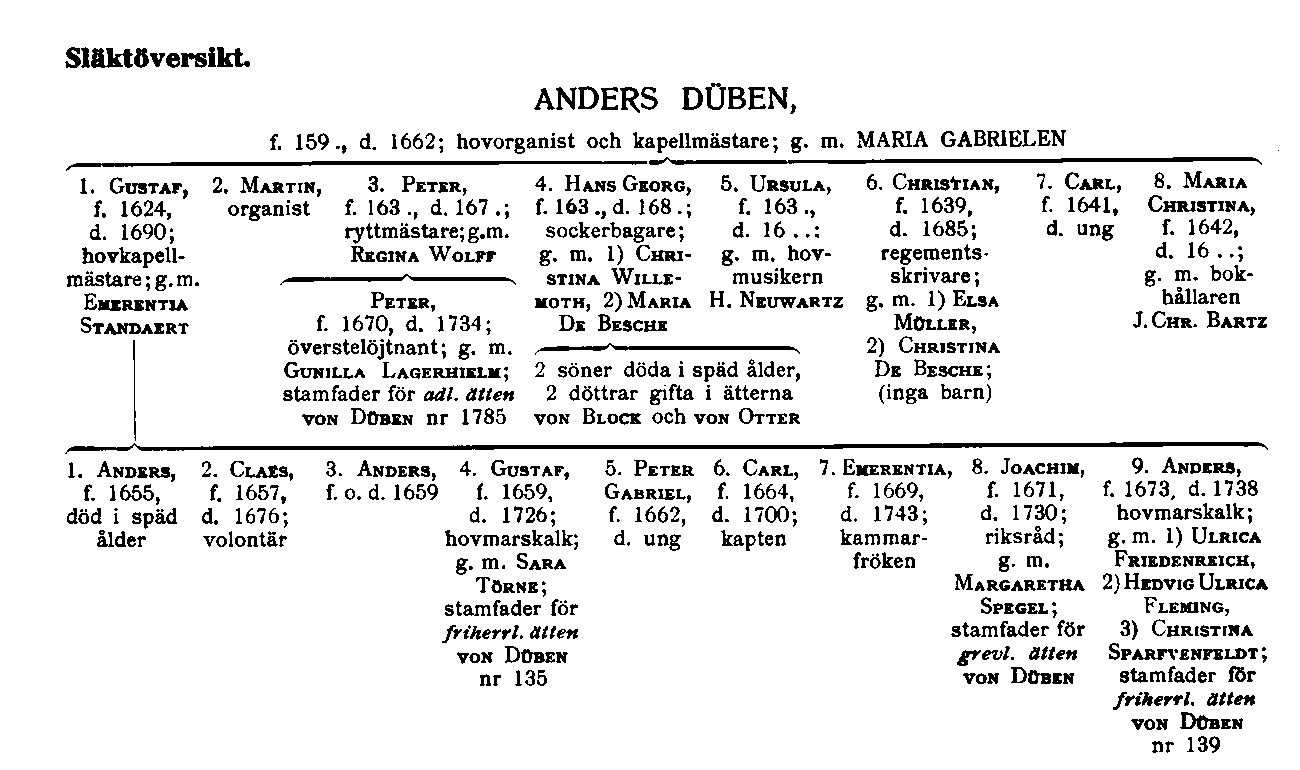
Family tree of Anders Düben

Michael Düben's son, Andreas Düben (1558–1625), who was sent to study at the Leipzig University. There he became acquainted with Sethus Calvisius and subsequently abandoned his academic studies to pursue music. He trained under the court organist Christoph Walter in Dresden, and later became organist at St. Thomas Church in Leipzig.

His son and namesake, Andreas Düben (c. 1597–1662), arrived in Sweden in 1620 after studying under Sweelinck in Amsterdam. In 1625, Düben started serving as an organist at the German Church in Stockholm.

Prominent figures in the family that were not musicians, but still with high-ranking positions include Emerentia von Düben, a lady-in-waiting and the favorite of Ulrika Eleonora, Queen of Sweden. Her nephew, Henrik Jakob von Düben, was Sweden's envoy to the Polish–Lithuanian Commonwealth, and the son of the latter, Anders Gustaf von Düben, was compelled to go into exile in 1833 after accompanying Gustav, Prince of Vasa. A. G. von Düben's grandson, Edward Wilhelm von Düben, served as Sweden's vice-consul to Salina Cruz, Mexico. He is the sole male ancestor of all living descendants with agnatic kinship.

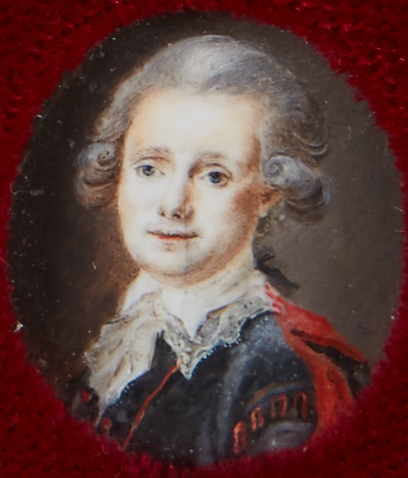
Joachim von Düben the Younger

During the 2024–2025 renovation of Botkyrka Church, a previously unknown burial vault was discovered, containing the remains of Ulrika von Düben (1749–1777), Fredrica Magdalena von Düben (1743–1765), and Joachim von Düben the Younger (1708–1786), as well as possibly other members of the family.

== Baroque music ==
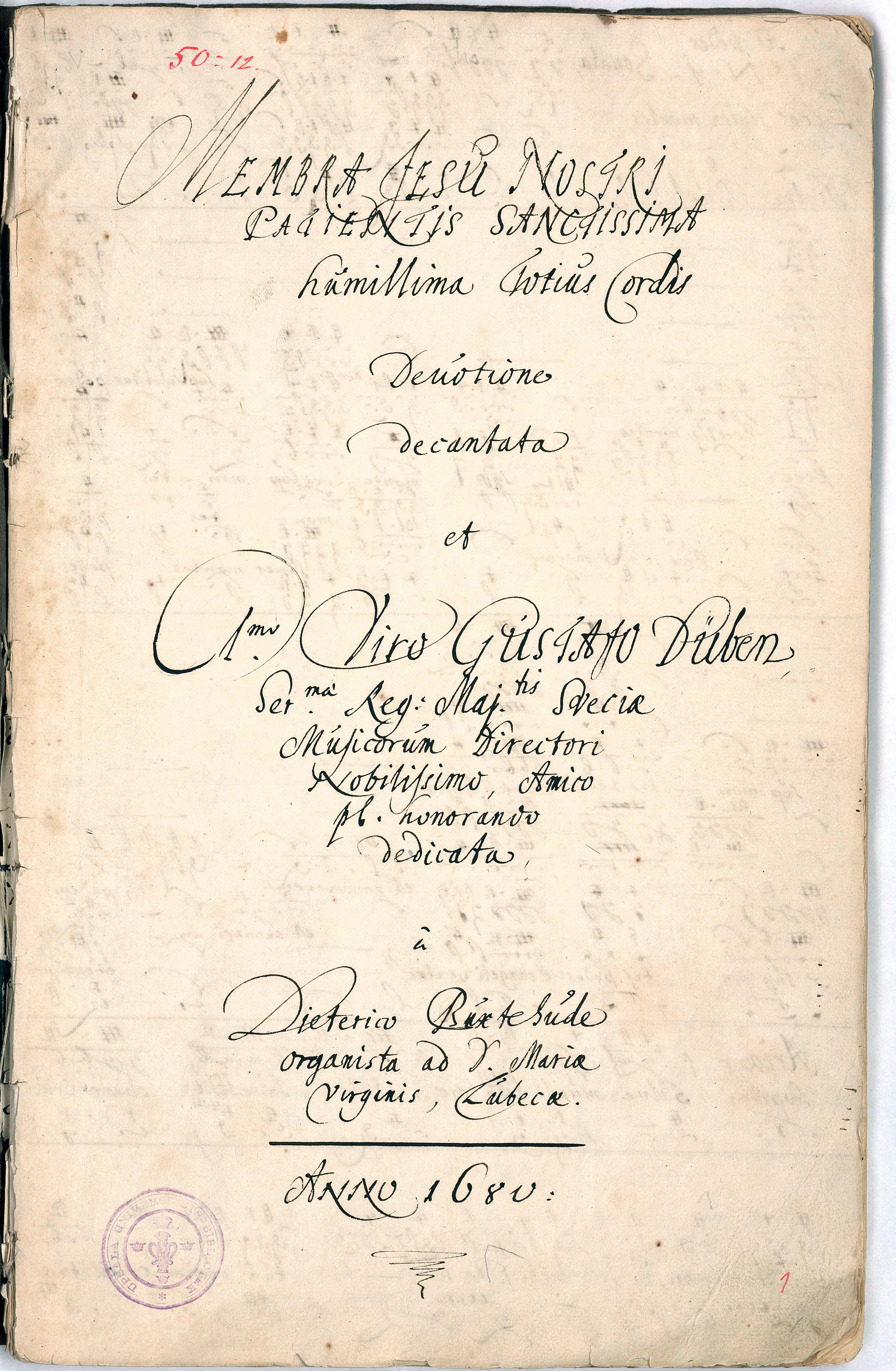
The Düben collection is a collection of musical manuscripts, which contains several works by members of the Düben family.

The family maintained a presence in Stockholm's music scene from the 1640s through the 18th century.

Gustaf Düben, an organist and composer, contributed the most to the Düben collection, which is now preserved at the Uppsala University Library. The collection include pieces by renowned composer Dieterich Buxtehude.

== Hereditary titles ==
The Düben family was ennobled at the House of Nobility on four occasions. In 1719, they were introduced with baronial rank (No. 135 & 139). In 1726, another branch of the family, with untitled noble rank (No. 1785). In 1719, the Düben family (No. 80) were introduced with baronial rank. Then in 1743, they were introduced with comital rank.

== Cultural references ==
The Düben family, based in Landskrona, hosted Selma Lagerlöf during her work period as a teacher, an event that was later featured in a biography. In Gränna, Sweden, there is a local alcoholic company that honors its former resident, A. C. von Düben, by naming a punsch after him.

== Family tree ==
- Andreas Düben (1597–1662)
  - Gustaf Düben (1624–1690)
    - Gustaf von Düben (1659–1726)
      - Carl Gustaf von Düben (1700–1758)
        - Ulrik Vilhelm von Düben (1739–1817)
          - Gustaf Henrik von Düben (1777–1833)
            - Gustaf von Düben (1822–1892) ∞ Lotten von Bahr (1828–1915)
    - Emerentia von Düben (1669–1743)
    - Joachim von Düben the Elder (1671–1730)
      - Ulrika Eleonora von Düben (1722–1758)
    - Anders von Düben the Younger (1673–1738)
      - Joachim von Düben the Younger (1708–1786)
        - Fredrika Eleonora von Düben (1738–1808)
      - Henrik Jakob von Düben (1733–1805)
        - Anders Gustaf von Düben (1785–1846)
          - August von Düben (1813–1867)
            - Gunilla von Düben (1862–1923)
          - Vilhelm von Düben (1816–1897)
            - Edvard von Düben (1865–1930)
          - Viktor von Düben (1818–1867)
          - Cesar von Düben (1819–1888)
            - Ingeborg von Düben

== See also ==
- List of Swedish noble families
- List of musical families (classical music)
- Music of Sweden

== Bibliography ==
- Anrep, Gabriel (1858). Svenska adelns ättar-taflor utgifna: Abrahamsson-Graufelt (in Swedish). P. A. Norstedt & Son̈er.
- Kjellberg, Erik [in Swedish] (2010). The Dissemination of Music in 17th Century Europe. Celebrating the Düben Collection. ISBN 9783034300575.
- Karlsson, Lars-Erik (1997). Släkten von Düben på Elvgärde (in Swedish).
- Norlind, T. (1918). Die Familie Düben (in German).
