= Didaco Philetari =

Italian composer

Didaco Philetari (fl. 1645), sometimes cited as Deodac Philetaerus, was an Italian composer and priest, presumably active in Germany, whose works are preserved in the Düben collection in Uppsala University Library. His Salve Rex Christe, which changes the text of the Salve Regina to be appropriate for a Lutheran audience, was recorded in 2009 by Anna Jobrant. It is an example of a contrafactum.
