= Anders von Düben the Younger =

Swedish nobleman, musician, composer

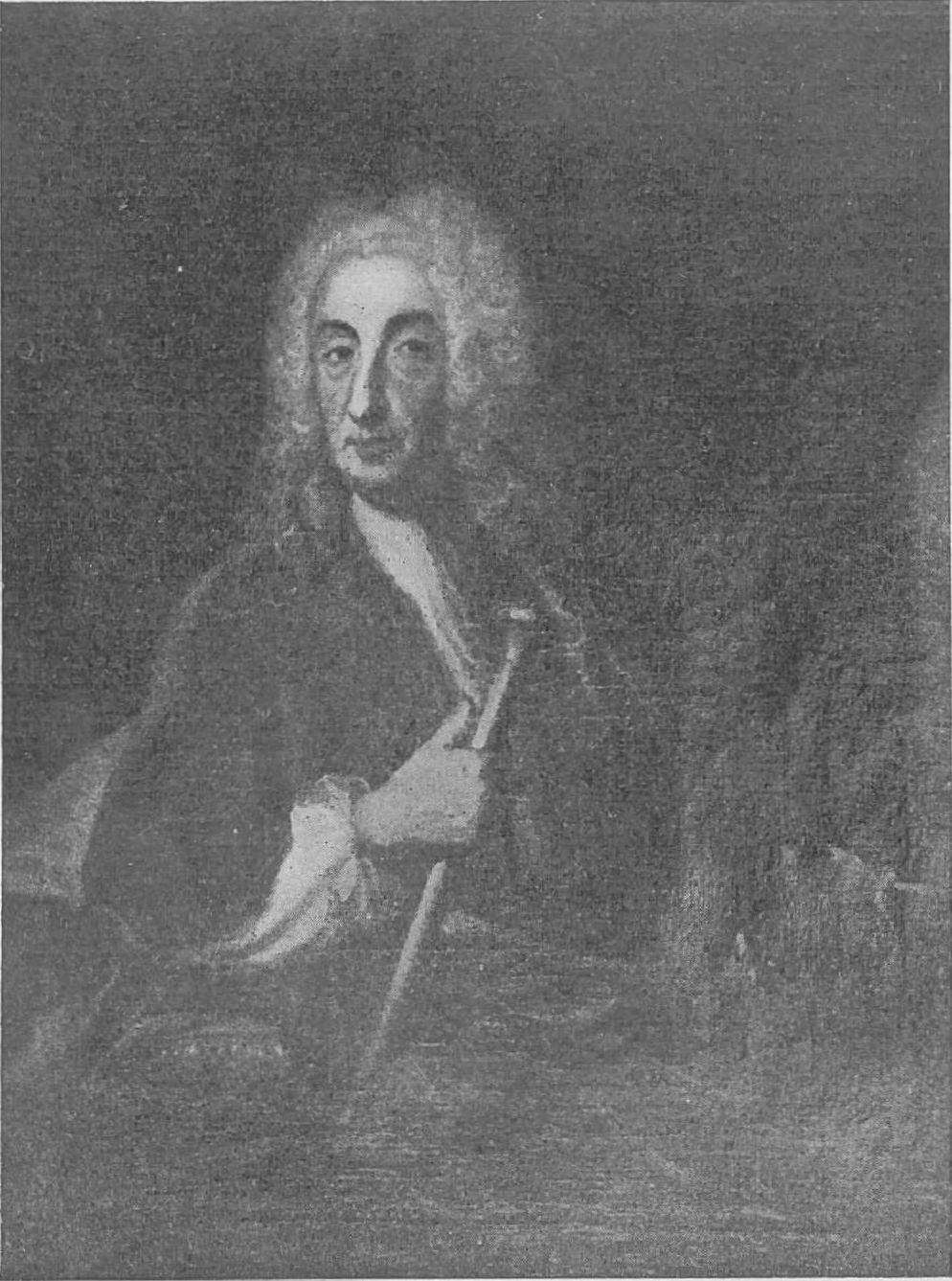

Court Chapel Master
- Tenure: 1699–1726
- Predecessor: Gustaf von Düben the Younger
- Successor: Francesco Uttini
- Born: 28 August 1673; Stockholm, Sweden
- Died: 23 August 1738 (aged 64); Stockholm, Sweden
- Family: Düben family
- Spouses: Ulrika Friedenreich (m. 1700; died 1715); Hedvig Ulrika Fleming af Liebelitz (m. 1715; died 1717); Christina Sparwenfeld (m. 1718–1738)
- Issue: 14 (including Henrik Jakob and Joachim)
- Father: Gustaf Düben
- Occupation: Kapellmeister; Organist

Anders von Düben the Younger (Swedish pronunciation: [ˈânːdɛʂ fɔn dy:ʹbən]; 28 August 1673 – 23 August 1738) was a Swedish composer, Kapellmeister and Hofmarschall. He was a member of the Düben family, which is noted for its role in the establishment of professional musical culture in Sweden.

== Early life ==
Anders von Düben was born into the Düben family, a Swedish noble family known for its baroque music. He was the son of Gustaf Düben and Emerentia Standaert (d. 1679), thus of German and Dutch descent. His siblings included Joachim and Emerentia, who served as Queen Ulrika Eleonora's lady-in-waiting.

== Musical career ==
Düben studied in Paris during the 1690s, and acquired the position of court chapel master at the Swedish royal court orchestra in 1698. Düben thereafter took office as chamberlain and hofmarschall.

Düben composed several works, encompassing both vocal and instrumental music. One of his documented compositions, Ballet de Narva, was written to celebrate the Battle of Narva and was performed in Stockholm in 1701. Other compositions include Huru kort och ont är dock vårt liv, and an opera, but by 1726, Düben had given up all his musical works to devote his time in his responsibilities at court.

Düben donated the so-called Düben collection to the Uppsala University Library. It contains music volumes dating from the 1640s onward, some of which were collected during the Grand Tour of his father, Gustaf Düben. It is also one of the most important sources for music of the 17th century, notably holding copies of works by Dieterich Buxtehude, and including works by French, German and Italian composers.

== Family ==
Düben married Ulrika Friedenreich in 1700, Hedvig Ulrika Fleming af Lieblitz in 1715, and Christina Sparwenfeld in 1718, the daughter of the linguist Johan Gabriel Sparwenfeld. He fathered 14 children, including Henrik Jakob, who served as Sweden's envoy to the Polish-Lithuanian Commonwealth, and Joachim, who became President of the Privy Council Chancellery of Sweden.

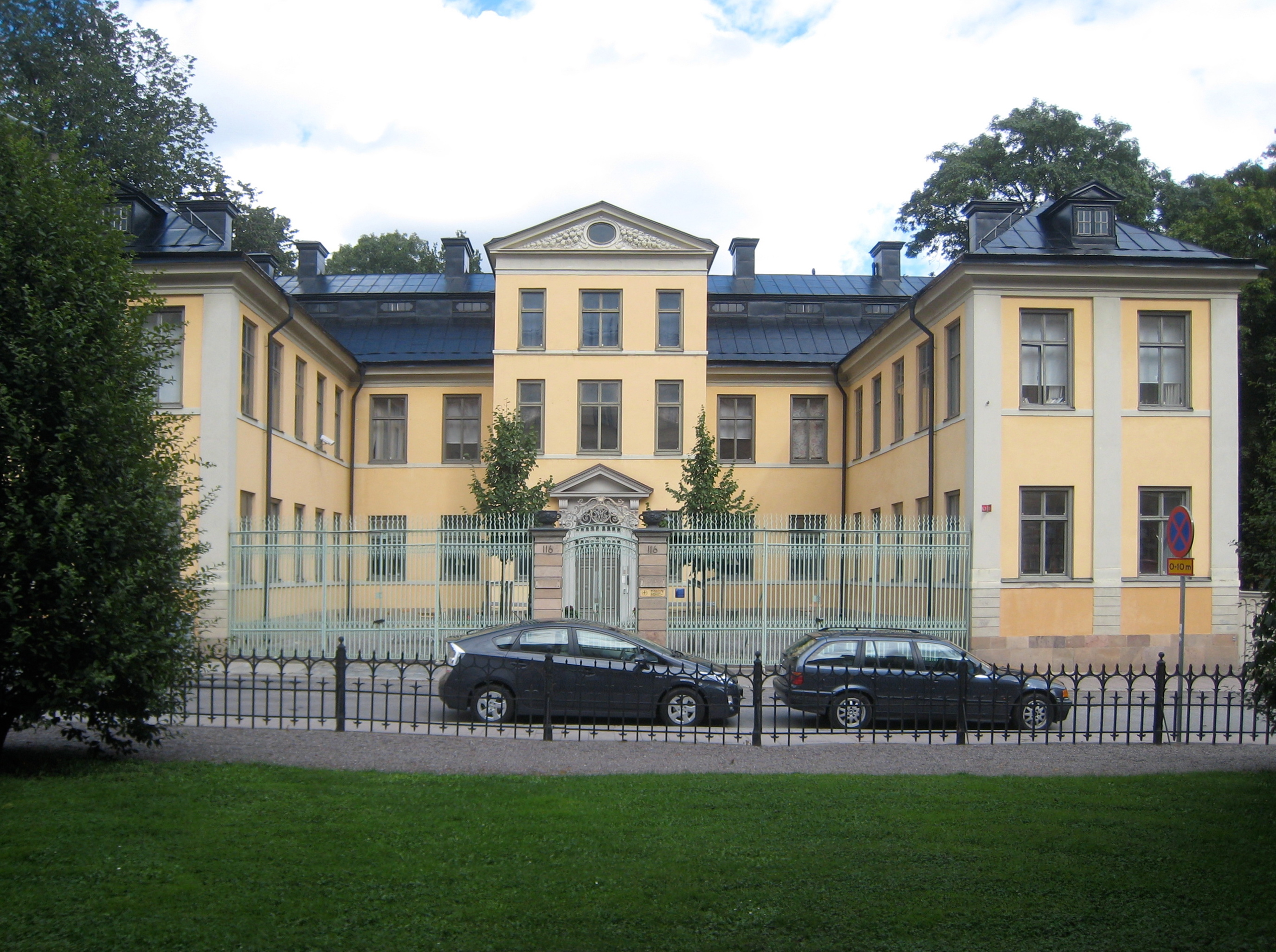
Scheffler Palace

Düben was first ennobled in 1707 and later raised to baronial rank in 1719. At the time of his elevation to the barony, his siblings Joachim and Emerentia were also elevated to nobility. In his later years, von Düben owned the Scheffler Palace in Norrmalm, Stockholm, holding the property from 1733 to 1738.

== See also ==
- Düben collection
