= Fredrika Eleonora von Düben =

Swedish artist (1738–1808)

- Born: 17 December 1738
- Died: 1 March 1808 (aged 69)
- Noble family: Düben family
- Spouse: Nils Adam Bielke
- Father: Joachim von Düben the Younger
- Mother: Catharina Eleonora Temminck
- Occupation: Painter

Fredrika Eleonora von Düben (December 17, 1738 – March 1, 1808) was a Swedish dilettante painter and embroidery artist.

== Early life ==
Fredrika Eleonora was born to Joachim von Düben the Younger and Catharina Eleonora Temminck, daughter of Hendrik Temminck, who was a colonial governor of Suriname from 1722 to 1727. Her father was a nephew of royal favourite Emerentia von Düben (1669–1743) and served as the cabinet secretary of Ulrika Eleonora, Queen of Sweden.

== Career ==
She was maid of honour to Queen Louisa Ulrika of Prussia from 1757 to 1759 and Chief Court mistress of the Swedish queen dowager in 1771–1782.

She was an honorary member of the Royal Swedish Academy of Arts (1783) after having participated in the art exhibition with an embroidered landscape in white silk.

== Personal life ==
In 1759, she married Count Nils Adam Bielke (1724–1792), who was previously married to her relative Ulrika Eleonora von Düben (1722–1758).

== Other Sources ==
- Fredrika Eleonora von Düben & Wilhelmina Stålberg (1864) Anteckningar om svenska qvinnor (Stockholm: P. G. Berg)
- Lindberg, Anna Lena (1998) Through the Needle's Eye: Embroidered Pictures on the Threshold of Modernity Eighteenth-Century Studies (Johns Hopkins University Press)
- Elgenstierna, Gustaf (1925–36) Den introducerade svenska adelns ättartavlor (Stockholm: Norstedts förlag)
- Dahlberg och Hagström (1953) Svenskt konstlexikon (Malmö; Allhems Förlag)
- Ribbing, Gerd (1958) Gustav III:s hustru. Sofia Magdalena (Stockholm: Alb. Bonniers Boktryckeri)
- Norrhem, Svante (2007) Kvinnor vid maktens sida, 1632-1772 (Nordic Academic Press) ISBN 9789189116917
- Von Düben nr 139
