= Den introducerade svenska adelns ättartavlor =

Swedish genealogical book

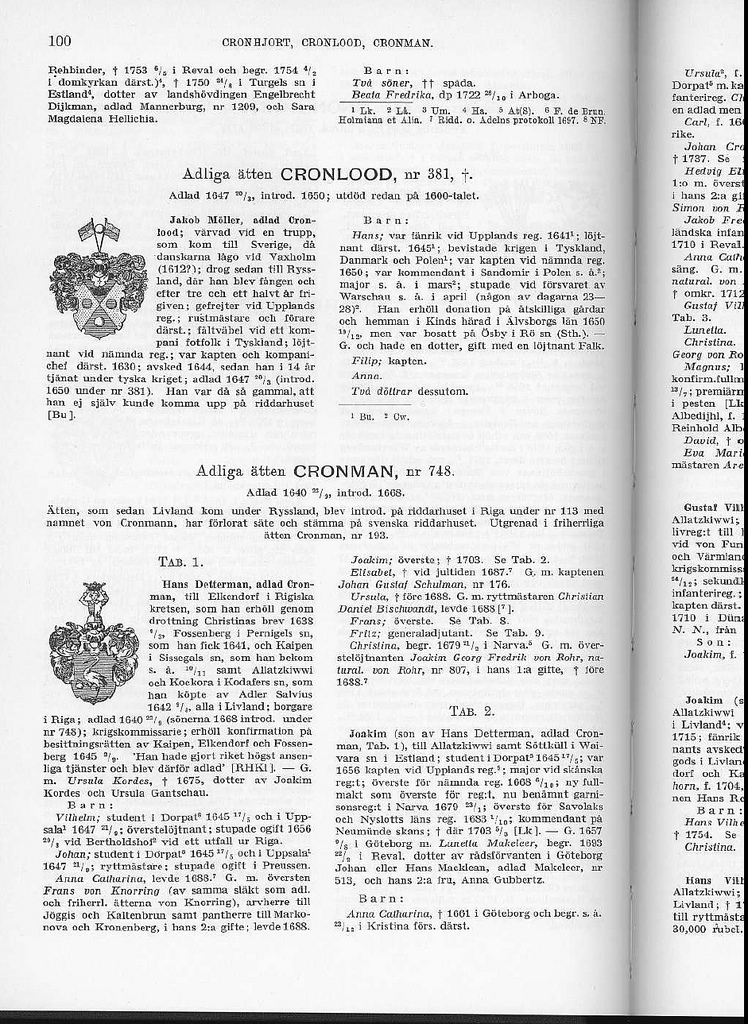
- A page from Den introducerade svenska adelns ättartavlor
- Author: Gustaf Elgenstierna (Editor)
- Language: Swedish
- Subject: Genealogy and biography of the Swedish nobility
- Genre: Reference work
- Publisher: P. A. Norstedt & Söner
- Publication date: 1925–1936
- Publication place: Stockholm
- Media type: Print (Hardcover)
- Pages: 9 volumes
- Preceded by: Svenska adelns Ättar-taflor utgifna (by Gabriel Anrep)

Den introducerade svenska adelns ättartavlor — Swedish for The introduced genealogical tables of the Swedish nobility — is a nine-volume genealogical and biographical reference series detailing the history of the introduced Swedish nobility. Edited by Gustaf Elgenstierna, the series was published between 1925 and 1936 by P. A. Norstedt & Söner. The series is recognized as the definitive standard for Swedish noble genealogy.

== History and background ==
Prior to being edited by Elgenstierna, the work was published as Svenska adelns Ättar-taflor utgifna by Gabriel Anrep in four volumes between 1858 and 1864.

In the following years after the publishing of Anrep's Svenska adelns Ättar-taflor utgifna, many noble genealogies were supplemented and revised. To address these inaccuracies, the Swedish House of Nobility commissioned Elgenstierna to revise and correct Anrep's earlier work. Elgenstierna emphasized that he would not rework from-scratch the entirety of Anrep's volumes, but would instead add and correct the work.

During the editorial process, in addition to Elgenstierna's own research, other Swedish researchers contributed to the volumes including, archivist, Johan Almquist, Professor, Gottfrid Carlsson and genealogist Govert Indebetou.

Volumes of the work were published between 1925 and 1936 in Stockholm by P. A. Norstedt & Söner.

== Legacy and modern versions ==
The series remains an indispensable reference framework for historical, biographical, and genealogical research in Sweden, though historians note that its medieval and 16th-century genealogies continue to require modern critical revision.

The House of Nobility has digitized the family trees and added corrections and additions to the work. However, this is only made available to members and researchers with the House of Nobility, and is not made available to the public.

A complete facsimile edition of the original nine volumes was printed in 1999. In 2008, two supplementary volumes were published by the Swedish Genealogical Association (Sveriges Släktforskarförbund). The original nine volumes were scanned and are hosted on Project Runeberg.

== Volumes ==
- Elgenstierna, Gustaf, ed. (1925). Den introducerade svenska adelns ättartavlor (in Swedish). Vol. 1 Abrahamsson-Celsing. Stockholm: Norstedt. SELIBR 10076137.
- Elgenstierna, Gustaf, ed. (1926). Den introducerade svenska adelns ättartavlor (in Swedish). Vol. 2 af Chapman-Fägerstråle. Stockholm: Norstedt. SELIBR 10076748.
- Elgenstierna, Gustaf, ed. (1927). Den introducerade svenska adelns ättartavlor (in Swedish). Vol. 3 Gadde-Höökenberg. Stockholm: Norstedt. SELIBR 10076750.
- Elgenstierna, Gustaf, ed. (1928). Den introducerade svenska adelns ättartavlor (in Swedish). Vol. 4 Igelström-Lillietopp. Stockholm: Norstedt. SELIBR 10076751.
- Elgenstierna, Gustaf, ed. (1930). Den introducerade svenska adelns ättartavlor (in Swedish). Vol. 5 Lind af Hageby-von Porten. Stockholm: Norstedt. SELIBR 10076756.
- Elgenstierna, Gustaf, ed. (1931). Den introducerade svenska adelns ättartavlor (in Swedish). Vol. 6 Posse-von Scheven. Stockholm: Norstedt. SELIBR 10076758.
- Elgenstierna, Gustaf, ed. (1932). Den introducerade svenska adelns ättartavlor (in Swedish). Vol. 7 Schildt-Sture. Stockholm: Norstedt. SELIBR 10076761.
- Elgenstierna, Gustaf, ed. (1934). Den introducerade svenska adelns ättartavlor (in Swedish). Vol. 8 Stålarm-Voltemat. Stockholm: Norstedt. SELIBR 10076764.
- Elgenstierna, Gustaf, ed. (1936). Den introducerade svenska adelns ättartavlor (in Swedish). Vol. 9 Wrangel-Östner. Stockholm: Norstedt. SELIBR 10076766.

== See also ==
- Svenska släktkalendern
- List of Swedish noble families
