= Hendrik Temminck =

Governor of Suriname
- In office 1 March 1722 – 17 September 1727
- Preceded by: François Anthony de Rayneval
- Succeeded by: François Anthony de Rayneval

Personal details
- Born: c. 1680 Arnhem, Dutch Republic
- Died: 17 September 1727 Paramaribo, Colony of Suriname
- Spouse(s): Charlotta Elisabeth van der Lith; Machteld van Wouw
- Relations: Fredrika Eleonora von Düben (granddaughter)

Hendrik Temminck (c. 1680 – 17 September 1727) was a Dutch States Army officer and colonial administrator who served as the governor of Suriname from 1722 to 1727. Born in Arnhem he emigrated to the Dutch colony of Suriname after receiving a law degree. Tremminck served in the armed forces before being appointed governor. His rule saw the expansion of coffee production in the colony.

== Career ==
Temminck was born in Arnhem around 1680. He studied law and after his graduation went to Suriname. He served as captain in a volunteer corps and in 1710 commanded a company in Eduard van Bentheim's regiment.

In 1716, he was appointed sergeant major of an infantry division. On 1 March 1722, Temminck was appointed Governor of Suriname. Temminck granted government-owned slaves permission to dance in the square in front of the Governor's residence on special occasions. This permission lasted until rescinded by his successor Jan Jacob Mauricius in the 1740s. Tremminck also made land grants to black soldiers, including an 520 acres (210 ha) estate granted to a captain. Because of nightime arson attacks by slaves Tremminck instituted a civic guard in Paramaribo.

Also in 1722 he established a sugar plantation at Berg en Dal. This included a mansion house, quarters for 82 adult slaves, a mill and accommodation for horses, cattle, sheep and goats. In 1727 the estate was valued at 71,000 Dutch guilder (equivalent to €978,452.42 in 2024).

Under Tremminck the number of coffee plantations in Suriname was expanded significantly, with export risings from 5,627 pounds (2,552 kg) in 1724 to 46,086 pounds (20,904 kg) in 1725 and 1,110,147 pounds (503,554 kg) by 1732 (under his successor).

== Personal life ==
Temminck married twice; first with Machteld van Wouw, and in 1725 with Charlotta Elisabeth van der Lith. He became Swedish artist Fredrika Eleonora von Düben's maternal grandfather through his and van Wouw's daughter Catharina Eleonora Temminck.

Tremminck died on 17 September 1727 in Paramaribo.
