= Johan Fredrik Ernst von Vegesack =

Swedish military officer (1792–1863)

Ernst von Vegesack
- Born: 18 September 1792
- Died: 24 October 1863 (aged 71); Stockholm, Sweden–Norway (present-day Sweden)
- Occupation: Military personnel
- Spouses: Catharina Gunilla Arenander (m. 1818–1848) Augusta Hallencreutz (m. 1858–1863)
- Relatives: Gunilla von Düben (granddaughter); Verner von Heidenstam (grandnephew)

Johan Fredrik Ernst von Vegesack (18 September 1792 – 24 October 1863) was a Swedish officer.

== Early life ==
Johan Fredrik Ernst von Vegesack was born on 18 September 1792 in Sweden, and was the first of eight children of Eberhard and Anna Beata von Vegesack (née Hammarfelt).

== Düben-Vegesack-treason ==
Von Vegesack was the last Swedish person sentenced to exile, along with Anders Gustaf von Düben, due to their ties to the late heir to the Swedish throne, Gustav, Prince of Vasa.

Von Vegesack sent a letter to his friend von Düben in the winter of 1832, resulting in being blamed for treacherous acts. Consequently, this led to the arrest of both von Vegseack and von Düben on the charge of high-treason.
