= Henrik Jakob von Düben =

Swedish nobleman, diplomat

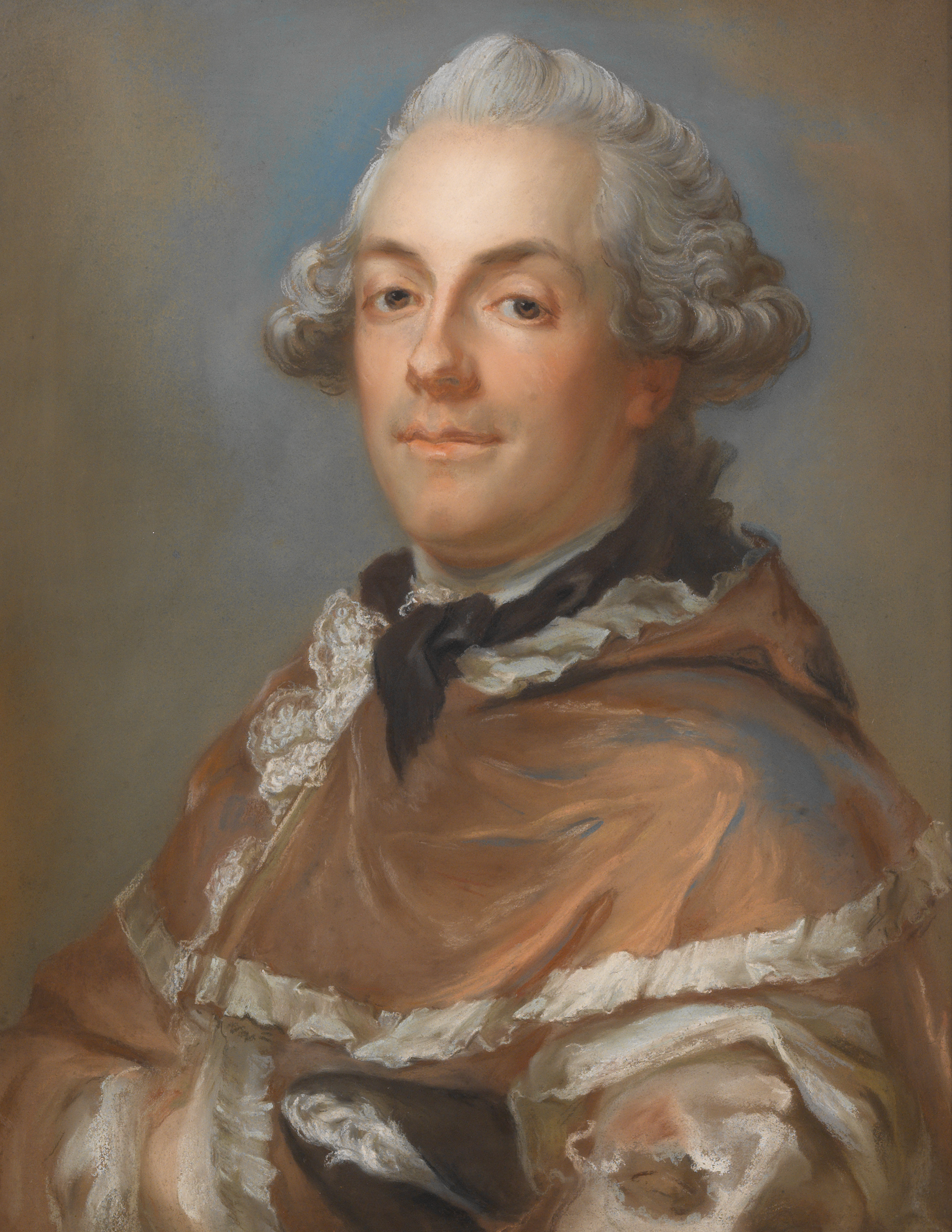
- Portrait by Gustaf Lundberg, 1780

Swedish Envoy to the Polish–Lithuanian Commonwealth
- Tenure: 1767–1772
- Born: May 1733; Stockholm, Sweden
- Baptised: 31 May 1733
- Died: 25 March 1805 (aged 71); Stockholm, Sweden
- Buried: 1805
- Noble family: Düben family
- Issue: Anders Gustaf
- Father: Anders von Düben the Younger
- Mother: Christina Sparwenfeld
- Occupation: Master of Ceremonies

Henrik Jakob von Düben (Swedish pronunciation: [ˈhɛ̌nːrɪk fɔn dy:ʹbən]; May 1733 – March 25, 1805) was a Swedish diplomat, Master of Ceremonies and Hofmarschall. Notably, he served as an envoy to the Polish-Lithuanian Commonwealth in 1767, during which time he headed the Embassy of Sweden in Warsaw until 1769 and also held the role of Minister Plenipotentiary in the Polish-Lithuanian Commonwealth.

== Early life ==
Born in Stockholm, Sweden, into the Düben family renowned for its contributions to classical music, he held the title of Freiherr, and was a half-brother of Joachim von Düben the Younger, the President of the Privy Council of Sweden.

Henrik Jakob von Düben was baptised on May 31, 1733, and entered the world as the son of the composer Anders von Düben the Younger and Christina Sparwenfeld, whose dad was linguist Johan Gabriel Sparwenfeld. Besides Swedish, he had Dutch and German ancestry.

== Diplomatic career ==
Düben, who was a student in Uppsala in 1746 and later associated with the court, served as an envoy to Poland in 1767 and was recalled in 1772. He was the head of the Embassy of Sweden in Warsaw from 1767 to 1769. During his time in the Polish-Lithuanian Commonwealth, he held the position of Minister Plenipotentiary.

Efforts were made to establish a bilateral trade agreement between Poland and Sweden, which Düben worked to finalize. In 1768, he also sought to persuade Swedish citizens in Poland, including the portraitist Per Krafft the Elder, to return to Sweden.

== Court career ==
In the 1750s, Düben arrived at the court of Adolf Frederick and Lovisa Ulrika, initially serving as the Master of Ceremonies. Gustav III appointed him as the Master of Ceremonies of the Court in 1779, a role he, however, relinquished in October 1781.

== Other efforts ==
Düben was elected as an auditor by the Riksdag of the Estates in the Swedish National Debt Office, including war financing.

== Family ==
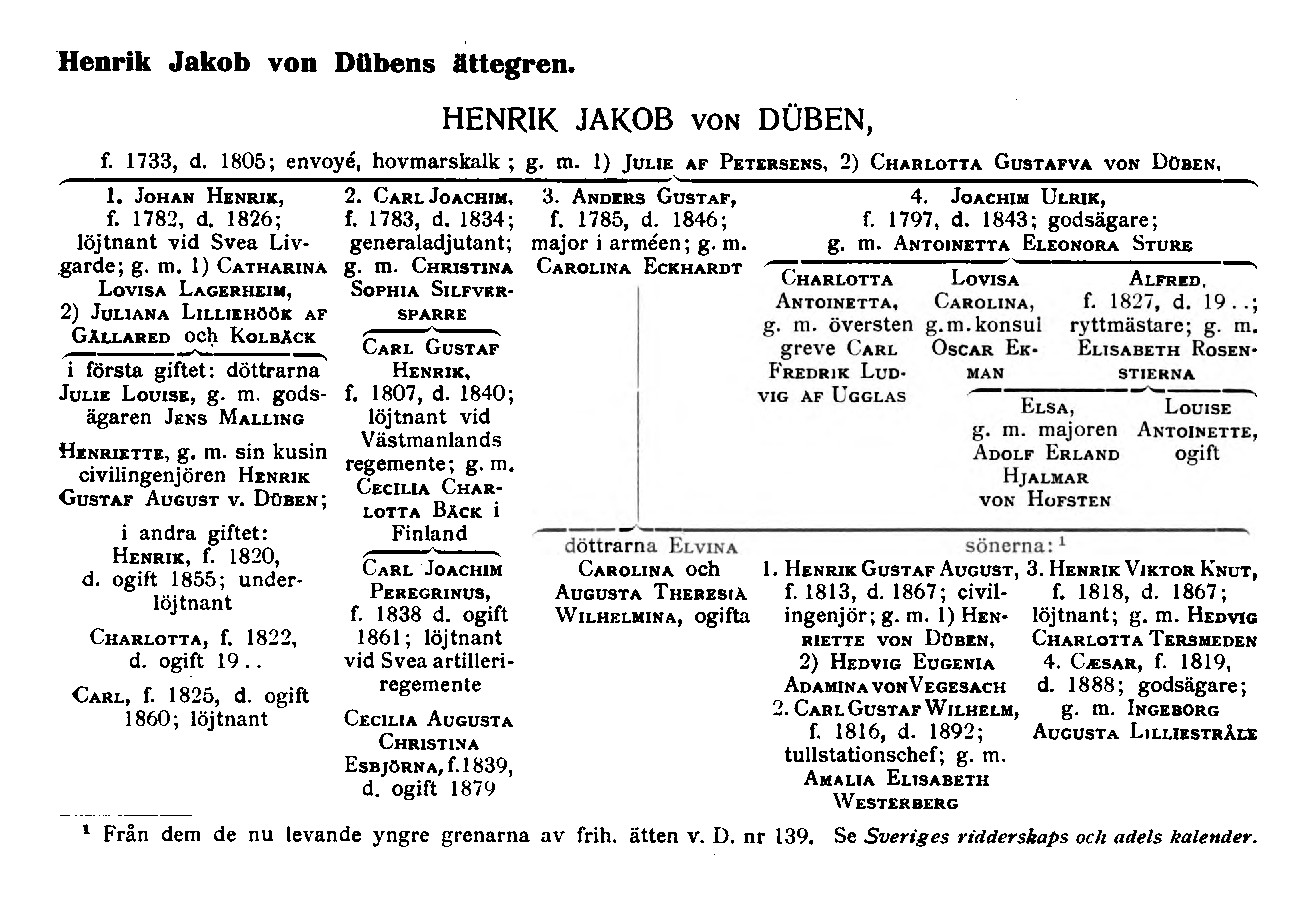
Family tree of Henrik Jakob von Düben

Düben married Julie af Petersens (1765–1791) in 1781, she was a daughter of Herman Petersen and Charlotta Bedoire. They had four children, including Anders Gustaf von Düben, who received an exile sentence.

In 1795, Düben married Gustafva Charlotta von Düben, his cousin's son's daughter. They had one child, Joacim Ulric von Düben.

Düben maintained a close connection with Élisabeth Soligny, a French ballet dancer, leading to an extramarital affair and the birth of an illegitimate child.

== Appointments ==
- Recipient of the Order of the Polar Star.
- Recipient of the Order of Saint Stanislaus .
- Recipient of the Order of the White Eagle .

== Sources ==
- Anrep, Gabriel (1858). Svenska adelns ättar-taflor (in Swedish). P. A. Norstedt u. Söhne.
- Bellman, Carl Michael. Skrifter: Dikter till enskilda, 1-4, 1757-1793 (in Swedish). A. Bonnie.
- Björnståhl, Jacob Jonas (1780). Resa til Frankrike, Italien, Sweitz, Tyskland, Holland, Ängland, Turkiet, och Grekeland: beskrifven af och efter J. J. Björnståhl ... Efter des död utgifven af Carl Christof Gjörwell. [With a portrait.] (in Swedish) – via Google Books.
- Dahlström, E. G. Bertil (1942). Rikets gäld 1788-1792: studier i den svenska riksgäldsförvaltningen jämte krigsfinansieringen 1788-1790 (in Swedish). Victor Pettersons bokindustri ab.
- Gjörwell, Carl Christoffer (1920). En Stockholmskrönika ur C. C. Gjörwells bref 1757-1778 (in Swedish). Bonnier.
- Grut, Marina (2007). Royal Swedish Ballet: History from 1592 to 1962. Georg Olms. ISBN 978-3-487-13494-9.
