= Scheffler Palace =

Coordinates: 59°20′24.49″N 18°03′19.80″E

- Schefflerska palatset
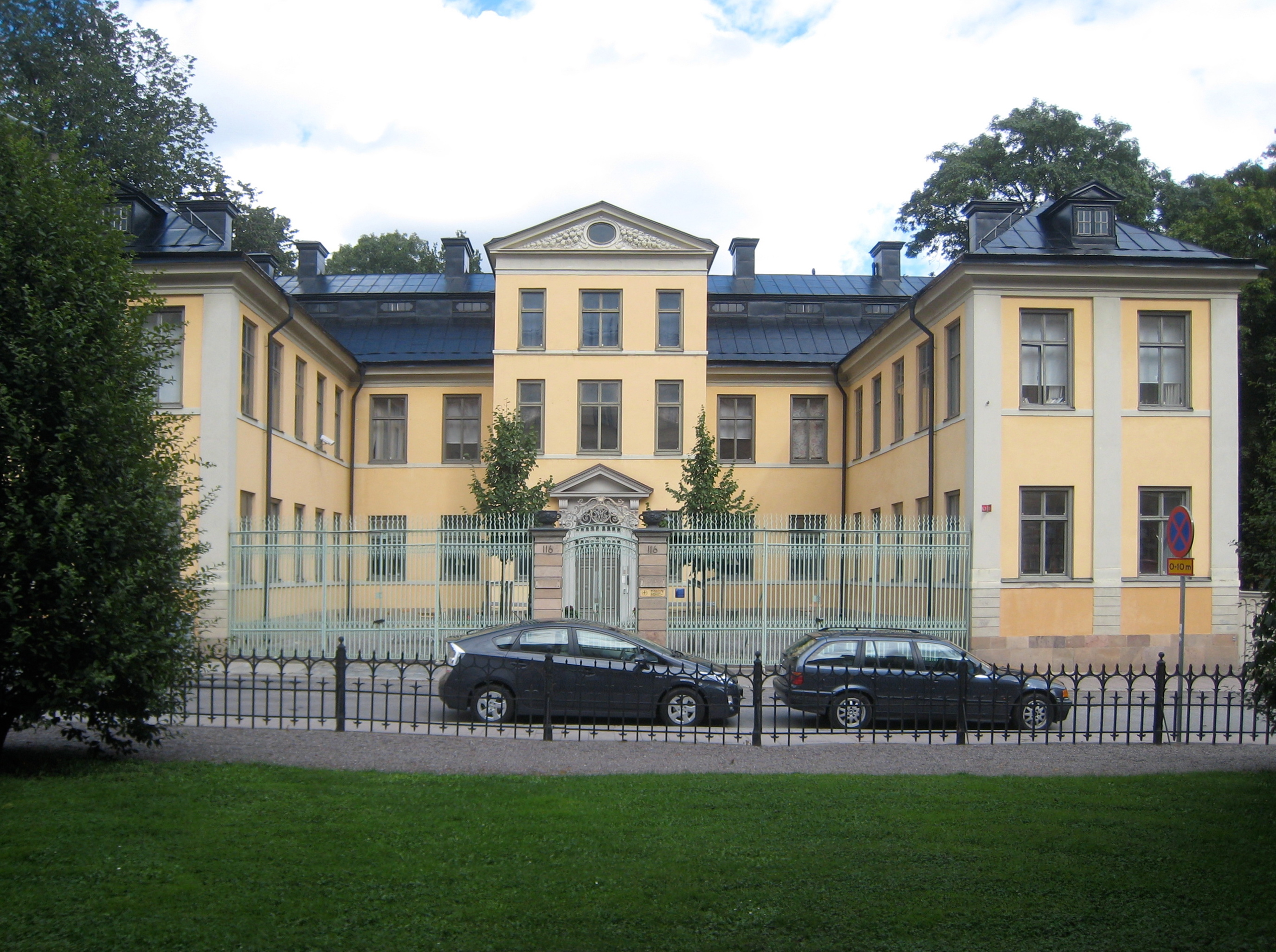
- Interactive map of the Scheffler Palace area
- Alternative names: Spökslottet

General information
- Location: Norrmalm, Drottninggatan 116, Stockholm, Sweden

The Scheffler Palace (Swedish: Schefflerska palatset) is a mansion located at Drottninggatan 116 in Stockholm, Sweden.

== History ==
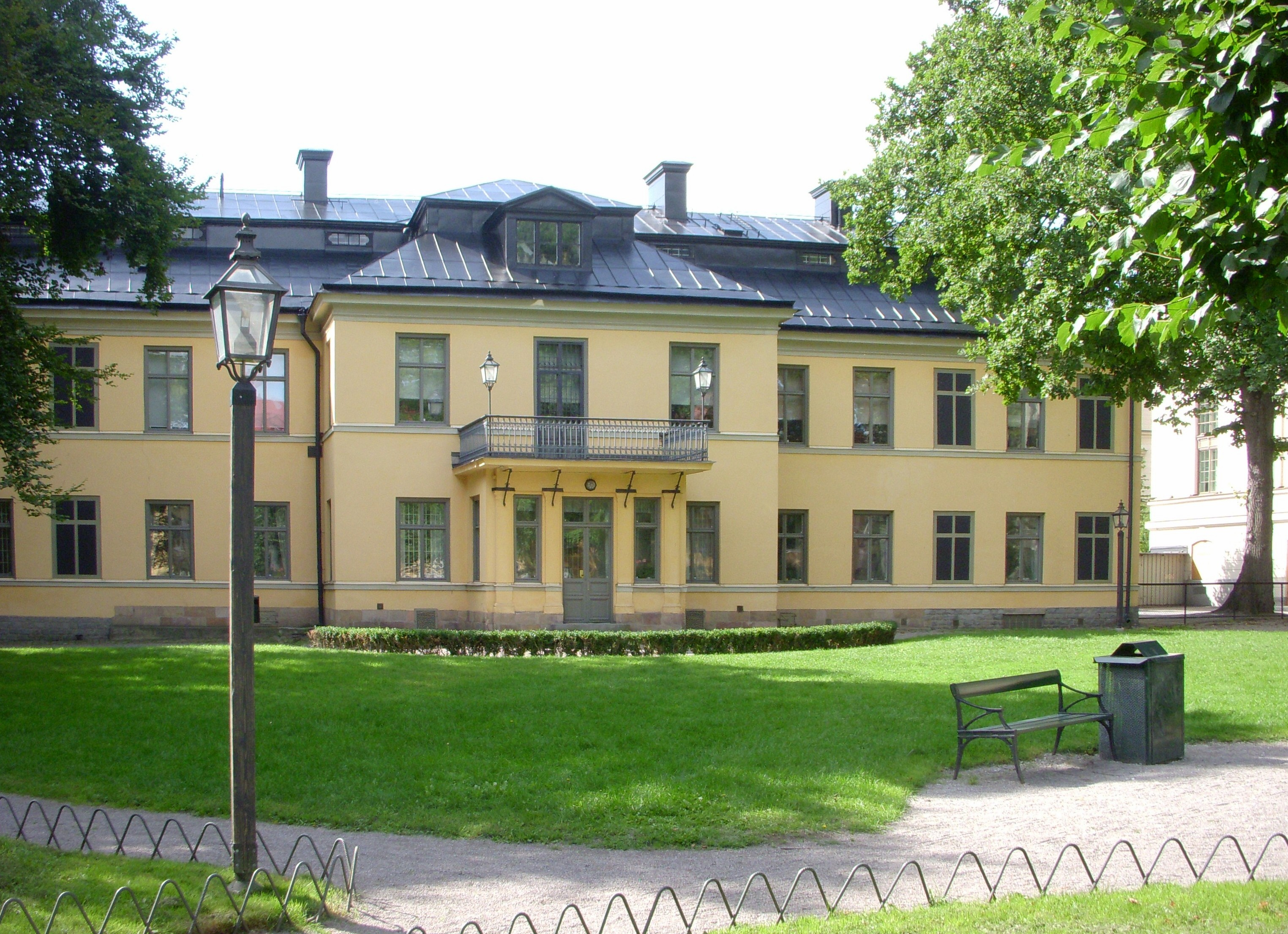
Scheffler Palace (2008)

The mansion was built in the 1690s by the merchant Hans Petter Scheffler (d. 1707). He bought the plot in 1697 and moved in there around 1700.

Anders von Düben the Younger owned the Scheffler Palace in Norrmalm, Stockholm, holding the property from 1733 to 1738.

In the years 1875–1876, a renovation was carried out under the direction of architect Axel Kumlien (1833-1913). The property remained a private residence during the 18th and 19th centuries. The house had a café business, Café Petissan, in the years 1870–1907. Since the 1920s, the estate has been owned by Stockholm University. Johan Adolf Berg (1827-1884), who started a successful civil engineering company, bequeathed his collection contains art from the 1500s to the 1800s as well as Orrefors glass to Stockholm University which is on display at Scheffler Palace.

== See also ==
- Architecture of Stockholm

== Other sources ==
- Linnell, Stig. Stockholms spökhus och andra ruskiga ställen. (ISBN 978-91-518-2738-4).
