= Angelina Valentijn =

Indigenous Indonesian woman who became wealthy (c. 1768 – 1817)

Angelina Catharina Valentijn, also Anjelina van Batavia, (c. 1768–1817) was born a slave in Batavia, Dutch East Indies, who after she was freed, accumulated remarkable financial and territorial wealth through her marriages.

== Life ==
The name and origin of her family and her parents' identity are unknown. However, baptized a Catholic at the age of three, she was raised in the household of Margaretha Catharina van Wargaren, wife of notary Wiggert Wargaren and probably her godmother. As Margaretha Catharina van Wargaren provided her with a European upbringing, Angelina became accustomed to and introduced into the culture, manners and habits of the wealthy bourgeoisie class of Batavia, where she would also have made the acquaintances and personal contacts that led to her future marriages.

=== Marriages ===
She would eventually marry three European men, that she had met among the influential circles of government and business of Batavia. Her first marriage to a German lieutenant, named Johann Samuel Heinrich Wüstenberg (1765–1803), brought her into possession of the Tjitrap Estate on Bali island and a share of another property in Soekaradja (southern Sumatra), which her husband had acquired around 1800. Wüstenberg died in 1803.

Her second marriage to Johannes Loetzrich took place a few months later in 1803. A third marriage at an unknown time and place to marine captain Adriaan Maarschalk from Zoutelande suggests that she also had survived her second husband. Angelina has experienced a phenomenal social increase in her life. From her origin as an orphan and slave she became owner of the colonial Estate at Tjitrap and at Sukkah Raja, she amassed a vast financial fortune and was respected among the top colonial elite of early nineteenth-century Batavia. Upon her death in 1817 at Batavia, the Tjitrap Estate was sold for the sum of 91,000 guilders.

== See also ==
- Anna Jens
