= Anna Jens =

18/19th century Dutch East Indies resident, convicted of abuse of slaves

Anna Apollonia Jens (1766–1815), born in Batavia on Java island in the Dutch East Indies, was a Dutch coffee plantation owner, notorious for her cruelty towards her house slaves.

== Life ==
She and her sister Hendrika Arnolda were the daughters of Arnold Jens, vice president of the aldermen in Batavia and his wife Anna Apollonia de Geus. She was very young when her father died and her mother remarried the widower Andries van Vessem, manager of the Batavian Orphanage. Thus Anna and Hendrika got a half-brother, Hendrik, who died in 1805.

In 1782, being fifteen years old, she was married to the First Administrator of the Warehouses Gose Theodore Vermeer with whom she had six children. Two years after his death in 1791 she married the seven years younger Junior Merchant Gerrit Willem Casimir van Motman in 1793 with whom she had two children, that probably died very young. In 1797, after four years marriage, Gerrit van Motman filed for divorce and left to live in Buitenzorg; he later became the first Resident of Preanger Regencies Residency in 1817. The divorce came into effect in 1809.

During the nine years of her first marriage to Gose Theodore, Anna Jens acquired the dubious reputation that she treated her house slaves with exceptional cruelty. Her behaviour apparently attracted considerable attention as the High Government in Batavia interfered. She was indicted and fined at a number of occasions and eventually summoned before the Supreme Court in Batavia, convicted for abuse, all rights to keep slaves were withdrawn and she was placed under observation. It remains unknown how her family, her husbands and children in particular, reacted to her atrocities, that were considered unacceptable at the time. She violated the ban and in 1809 was finally shunned from operating any business and sentenced to a 25-year prison term. After having only served two years she was set free on the condition that she would remain unmarried. Anna Apollonia Jens died three years later in September 1815 in Semarang.

== Legacy ==
Why Victor Ido van de Wall dedicated an entire chapter to Anna Apollonia Jens in his 1923 chronicle Vrouwen uit den Compagnie’s tijd is unclear. Perhaps because of the rather sadistic, yet also tragic aspects of her life story, or perhaps as a rare example of cruel behavior that was unacceptable even at the time and place. He himself called her a pitiful figure, a remark that could imply it would have been better, had she been put under professional mental treatment.

== See also ==
- Angelina Valentijn
- Susanna du Plessis
