= Svenska släktkalendern =

Swedish genealogical encyclopedia of Swedish non-aristocratic families

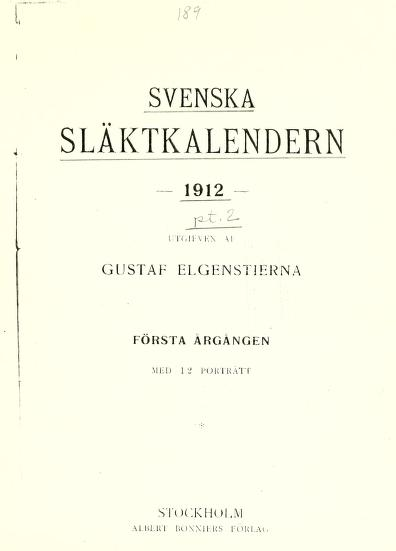
- Publication date: 1912

Svenska släktkalendern or in English: "Swedish family calendar" is a Swedish genealogical encyclopedia of Swedish non-aristocratic families. It was a companion series to Den introducerade svenska adelns ättartavlor.

== History ==
It has between 1912 and 2007 been published in 29 editions. The first edition contained 301 families, the 2007 edition has 77,000 people in 1,938 families. It was edited by Gustaf Elgenstierna. The next edition is scheduled for 2010.

== See also ==
- Den introducerade svenska adelns ättartavlor
