= Gustaf Elgenstierna =

Swedish genealogist(1871–1948)

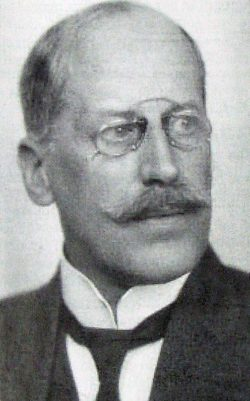
- Gustaf Elgenstierna c.1900
- Born: August 26, 1871; Klofsten, Södermanland, Sweden
- Died: March 21, 1948 (aged 76); Lidingö, Stockholm County, Sweden
- Occupation: genealogist
- Spouse: Clara Sandberg
- Writing career
- Language: Swedish
- Notable works: Den introducerade svenska adelns ättartavlor; Svenska släktkalendern

Gustaf Magnus Elgenstierna (26 August 1871 – 21 March 1948) was a Swedish genealogist and postal official. Elgenstierna is most well known for correcting the work of Gabriel Anrep which was published as Den introducerade svenska adelns ättartavlor and his work on other Swedish genealogy publications.

== Early life ==
Elgenstierna's Coat of Arms

Gustaf Magnus Elgenstierna was born on 26 August 1871 to Carl Elgenstierna and Evelina Petersohn in Klofsten, Södermanland, Sweden. He was born to the noble Elgenstierna family which was ennobeled in 1719.

== Career ==
Elgenstierna completed his school-leaving examination in 1891 and passed the postal-service examination in 1892. He became a postal clerk in 1902, a first-class postal clerk in 1915, and served as a controller in the General Post Board from 1920 until his retirement in 1937. He was the bokauktionskommissarie in Stockholm from 1905 to 1911; member of the board of the Swedish Nobility League in 1924; corresponding member of the Society for the Danish-Norwegian Genealogical and Personal History Association in 1924; Member of the Genealogical Society of Finland in 1928; and a member of the Royal Society for Publication of Manuscripts on Scandinavian History in 1927 and he became an honorary member of the Society for Danish Genealogical and Personal History Association in 1937.

Beginning in 1911, Elgenstierna edited the first thirteen volumes of Svenska släktkalendern, a genealogical reference work primarily covering non-noble Swedish families.

Elgenstierna's principal genealogical work was the nine-volume Den introducerade svenska adelns ättartavlor, published between 1925 and 1936. It was prepared from the revised genealogies of the Swedish House of Nobility and was intended to supersede the nineteenth-century family tables of Gabriel Anrep. Elgenstierna emphasized that the project was an editorial undertaking rather than a complete re-investigation of the entire body of material, but it incorporated later scholarship, his own research and contributions from other genealogists and historians. The edition also introduced an extensive apparatus of precise source and literature references. Bengt Hildebrand, writing in the Svenskt biografiskt lexikon, described the work as an indispensable reference for historical, biographical and genealogical research, while noting that some of its medieval and sixteenth-century genealogies required further critical revision.

From 1938 until his death, Elgenstierna edited the separate Sveriges ridderskaps och adels kalender, the calendar of the Swedish nobility.

== Personal life and death ==
Elgenstierna married Clara Sandberg in 1908. She was the daughter of the postmaster Gustav Sandberg; and Ida Stjerncreutz. The couple had two daughters.

Elgenstierna passed away at the age of 76 in Lidingö, Stockholm County.

== Bibliography ==
- Elgenstierna, Gustaf, ed. (1925). Den introducerade svenska adelns ättartavlor (in Swedish). Vol. 1 Abrahamsson-Celsing. Stockholm: Norstedt. SELIBR 10076137.
- Elgenstierna, Gustaf, ed. (1926). Den introducerade svenska adelns ättartavlor (in Swedish). Vol. 2 af Chapman-Fägerstråle. Stockholm: Norstedt. SELIBR 10076748.
- Elgenstierna, Gustaf, ed. (1927). Den introducerade svenska adelns ättartavlor (in Swedish). Vol. 3 Gadde-Höökenberg. Stockholm: Norstedt. SELIBR 10076750.
- Elgenstierna, Gustaf, ed. (1928). Den introducerade svenska adelns ättartavlor (in Swedish). Vol. 4 Igelström-Lillietopp. Stockholm: Norstedt. SELIBR 10076751.
- Elgenstierna, Gustaf, ed. (1930). Den introducerade svenska adelns ättartavlor (in Swedish). Vol. 5 Lind af Hageby-von Porten. Stockholm: Norstedt. SELIBR 10076756.
- Elgenstierna, Gustaf, ed. (1931). Den introducerade svenska adelns ättartavlor (in Swedish). Vol. 6 Posse-von Scheven. Stockholm: Norstedt. SELIBR 10076758.
- Elgenstierna, Gustaf, ed. (1932). Den introducerade svenska adelns ättartavlor (in Swedish). Vol. 7 Schildt-Sture. Stockholm: Norstedt. SELIBR 10076761.
- Elgenstierna, Gustaf, ed. (1934). Den introducerade svenska adelns ättartavlor (in Swedish). Vol. 8 Stålarm-Voltemat. Stockholm: Norstedt. SELIBR 10076764.
- Elgenstierna, Gustaf, ed. (1936). Den introducerade svenska adelns ättartavlor (in Swedish). Vol. 9 Wrangel-Östner. Stockholm: Norstedt. SELIBR 10076766.
- Køping stads tjænstemæn 1605-1905: personhistoriska anteckningar (1905)
- Svenska Släktkalendern (1911)
