= Anders Gustaf von Düben =

Swedish painter and military personnel (1785–1846)

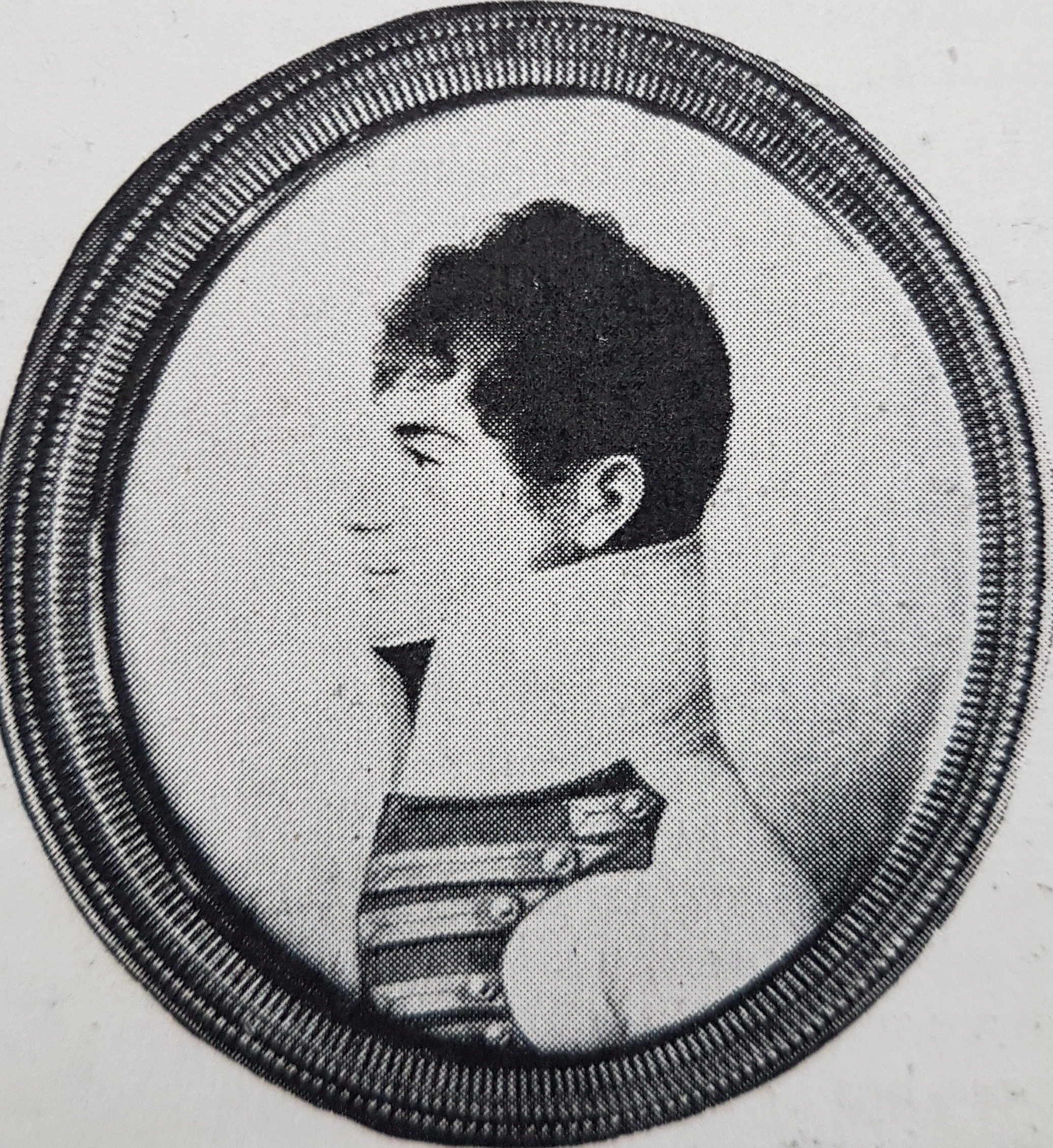
- Portrait by Jacob Axel Gillberg

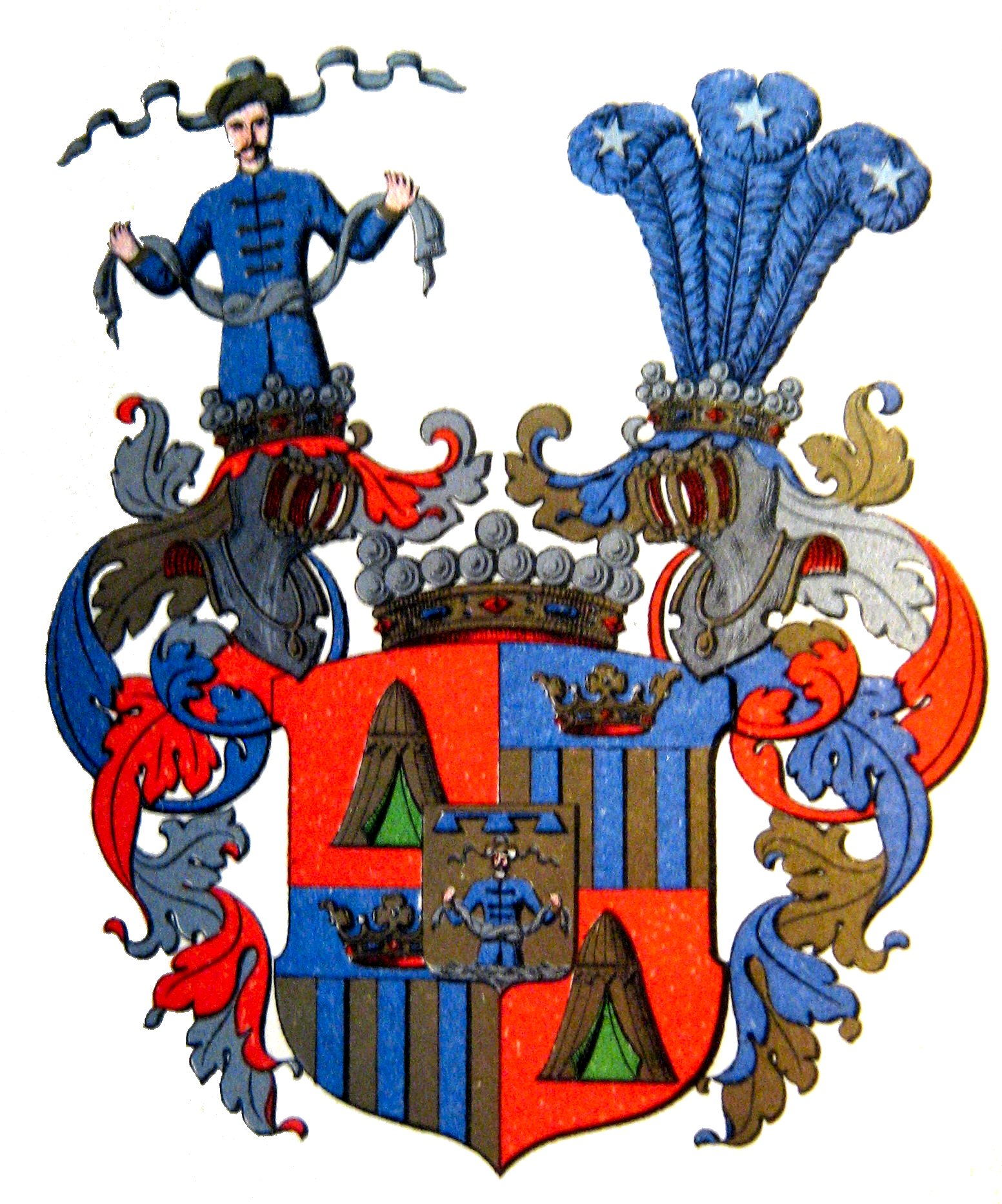
- Coat of arms
- Born: 2 June 1785; Stockholm, Sweden
- Died: 4 October 1846 (aged 61); Stockholm, Sweden
- Buried: 10 October 1846; Hedvig Eleonora Church
- Wars and battles: Franco-Swedish War
- Family: Düben family
- Spouse: Carolina Maria Eckhardt (m. 1810; died 1846)
- Issue: Viktor; Cesar
- Father: Henrik Jakob von Düben
- Mother: Julie af Petersens

Anders Gustaf von Düben (Swedish pronunciation: [ˈânːdɛʂ ˈɡɵ̂sːtav fɔn dy:ʹbən]; 2 June 1785 – 4 October 1846) was a Swedish painter, military officer, and member of the Riksdag of the Estates. Notably, he maintained personal connections with the former royal house of Holstein-Gottorp, which historically held the throne of the Kingdom of Sweden. Düben gained recognition for being the final Swedish individual, along with Johan Fredrik Ernst von Vegesack, to receive an exile sentence, owing to his implication in the Düben-Vegesack treason incident.

== Early life ==
Born in Stockholm, Sweden, into the Düben family, renowned for its contributions to classical music, he held the title of Freiherr. He entered the world as the son of the diplomat Henrik Jakob von Düben and Julie af Petersens, whose father was Herman Petersen. His ancestry comprised a blend of French, Dutch, German, and Scottish origins, with a lineage tracing back to French Huguenots in Saintonge.

== Career ==
At the age of eighteen, Düben was appointed as fänrik in the Svea Life Guards. He later served as a lieutenant during the Franco-Swedish War, earning the military medal For Valour in the Field (Swedish: För tapperhet i fält) in 1807. Subsequently, he assumed the rank of captain in the army and was bestowed with the title and dignity of major in 1815.

In 1810, Düben was an eyewitness to the murder of Axel von Fersen, where he provided several witness statements. During the murder, Düben was one of the individuals who surrounded and tried to protect him, together with a small circle of defenders, but as the violence became overwhelming, they were ultimately forced to yield.

Following his military career, he then pursued a vocation as a painter and exhibited at the Royal Swedish Academy of Fine Arts' exhibition in 1826. An esteemed landscape painter, several of Düben's paintings were purchased by Gustav, Prince of Vasa.

Düben was a member of the Riksdag of the Estates in 1817–1818, 1840–1841 and 1844–1845.

== Düben-Vegesack-treason ==
Düben was the last Swedish person sentenced to exile, along with Johan Fredrik Ernst von Vegesack, due to their ties to the late Hereditary Prince of Sweden, as they were suspected of having kept an illegal correspondence with the Prince. Even though Düben had pledged in 1829 to stop corresponding with him. Düben's ties to Gustav, Prince of Vasa was established during the Prince's infant years. He was a supporter of the Prince's family and their lineage.

Vegesack, who at the time was stationed in Berlin, sent a letter to his friend von Düben, asking him to meet up with Gustav, Prince of Wasa, during a sejour to Vienna in the winter of 1832. Vegsack had denied that the letter was written by him. The letter was intercepted, leading to von Düben and von Vegesack being accused of treacherous acts. Which consequently led to the arrest of Veseack and Düben on the Charge of High Treason on October 4, 1832. In March 1833, they received an exile sentence, and in May, they both went to Germany. He returned to Sweden in 1835.

== Family ==
In 1810, he married a woman from Swedish Pomerania named Carolina Maria Eckhardt (1794–1861). She was the daughter of a printer named Johann Heinrich Eckhardt. They had a child named Cesar von Düben, who later became a pioneer in photography.

== Appointments ==
- For Valour in the Field.

== Sources ==
- Anrep, Gabriel (1858). Svenska adelns ättar-taflor utgifna: Abrahamsson-Graufelt (in Swedish). P. A. Norstedt & Son̈er.
- Bennett, Terry; Stewart, Lindsey; Payne, Anthony (2009), History of Photography in China 1842–1860, ISBN 9780956301208 – via Google Books
- Bloomfield, Benjamin (1884). Memoir of Benjamin, Lord Bloomfield. Cornell University Library. London, Chapman and Hall – via Google Books.
- Hildebrand, Bengt (1945). "Düben, Düben von, släkt" (in Swedish). National Archives of Sweden. p. 634.
- Hofberg, Herman; Heurlin, Frithiof; Millqvist, Viktor; Rubenson, Olof (1906). 8. Düben, Anders Gustaf von (in Swedish) – via Project Runeberg.
- Hultman, Harald (1974). Prinsen av Vasa: den siste gustavianen (in Swedish). Bonnier. ISBN 978-91-0-039377-9.
- Lindeberg, Anders (1839). Bidrag till Sveriges Historia efter den 5 November 1810. [By A. Lindeberg.] (in Swedish).
- Lundberg, Amalia (1848). Bref ... före och under hennes vistande utomlands, etc (in Swedish).
- Ridderstad, Carl Fredrik (1882). Regnbågen: Interiörer från olika tider Anteckningar och minnen (in Swedish). Ridderstad – via Google Books.
- Schinkel, B. v (1881). Saml. Minnen ur Sveriges nyare historia (in Swedish) – via Google Books.
