= Cesar von Düben =

Swedish photographer and writer

Freiherr Cesar von Düben
- Born: 24 November 1819; Stockholm, Sweden-Norway (now part of Sweden)
- Died: 18 September 1888 (aged 68); Skövde, Sweden-Norway
- Noble family: Düben family
- Spouse: Augusta Lilliestråle (m. 1860)
- Issue: Ingeborg
- Father: Anders Gustaf von Düben
- Mother: Carolina Maria Eckhardt
- Occupation: Photographer

Cesar von Düben (24 November 1819 – 18 September 1888) was a Swedish photographer, explorer and writer. A pioneering photographer working with the photographic process called daguerreotype, Von Düben set up, according to paper trails, the earliest known commercial photographic studio in Portuguese Macau (now part of Macau). In addition, he wrote on the topic of travel literature.

== Early life ==
Cesar von Düben was born a freiherr on 24 November 1819, in Stockholm, Sweden-Norway (now part of Sweden), and was the fifth of six children of Anders Gustaf and Carolina Maria von Düben (née Eckhardt), an immigrant from Swedish Pomerania (now part of Germany). His father was a painter and a military personnel.

== Career ==
Von Düben left Sweden in 1843, and spent fifteen years abroad and took up photography. He practiced in Southeast Asia, e.g. Mexico, Manila, Shanghai, Singapore, and in Macau in the 1850s, where he set up a photographic studio, which he announced in local newspapers. He then traveled to Hong Kong, where he set up the same business. Von Düben stayed longer than planned in the cities mentioned. He operated as a photographer at the Hotel der Nederlanden in 1857 too. Moreover, Von Düben and Herman Husband were the first to introduce daguerreotype photography in Shanghai.

In addition, he traveled through India, which he wrote about.

In 1871, Von Düben published a travelogue on the French Guiana, California, China, and the East Indies.

In 1886, Von Düben published another travelogue, Memories from Java.

Von Düben married writer Augusta Lillistråle on 18 June 1860. The couple had a daughter named Ingeborg, born in 1862.

Von Düben died on 18 September 1888, aged 68, in Skövde, Västergötland.

== Bibliography ==
- Resor uti Guiana, Mexico, Californien, China och Ostindien, företagna under åren 1843–1858, 1871 (in Swedish) – via Google Books.

== See also ==
- History of photography
