= Susanna du Plessis =

Susanna du Plessis (1739–1795) was a plantation owner in Dutch Surinam. She is a legendary figure in the history of Suriname, where she probably unjustly has become a metaphor of a cruel and sadistic slave owner. She is the subject of songs, plays, fairy tales and legends as well as books.

== Life ==
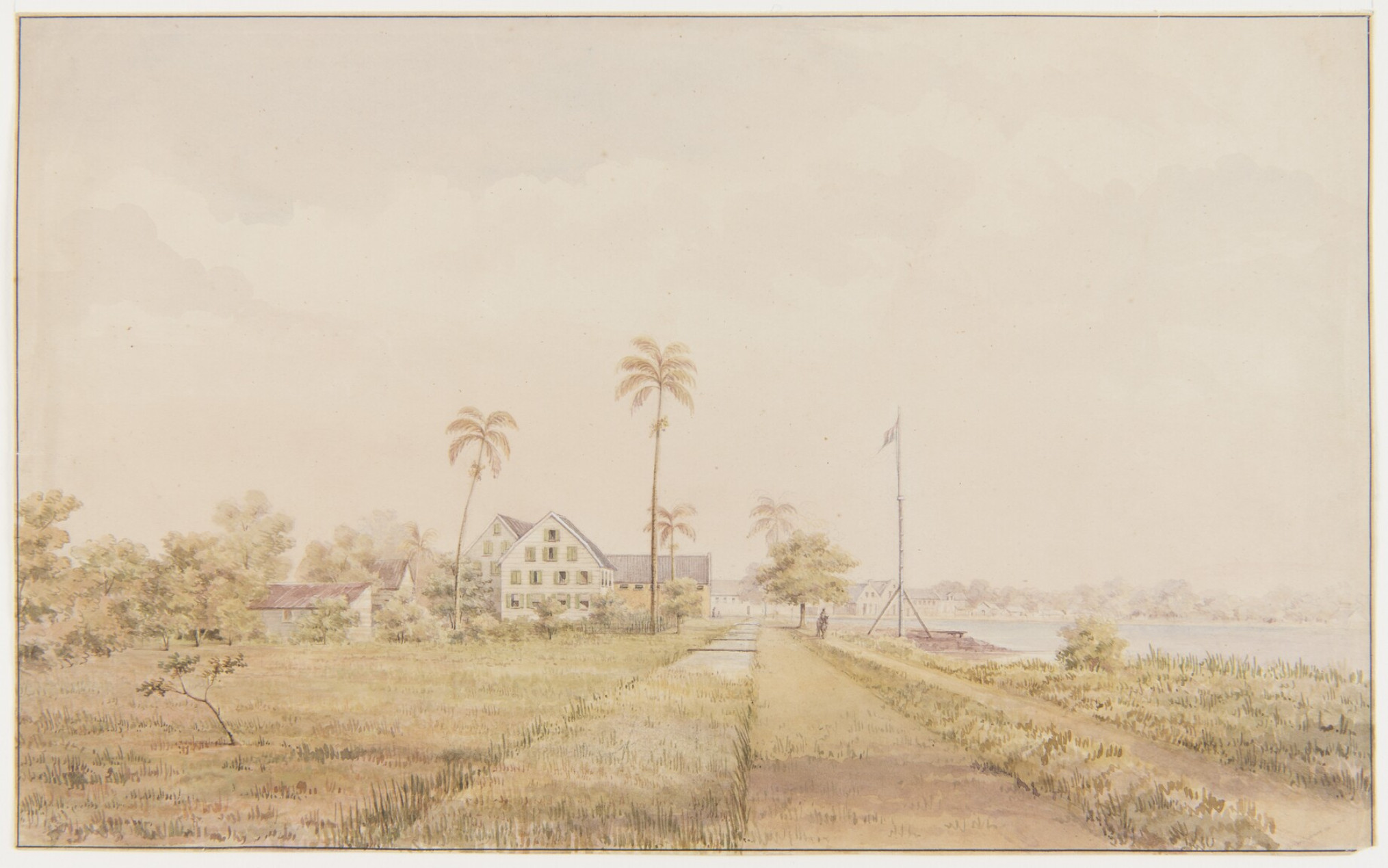
Plantation Nijd en Spijt and Alkmaar near the Commewijne River

Born in 1739 in Paramaribo, Susanna was the daughter of Dutch lawyer Solomon du Plessis (1705-1785) and the plantation owner Johanna Margaretha van Strijp (1706–1769). She descended from French Huguenot refugees on her father's side. Her mother had inherited a plantation after her first spouse. Her father returned to the Netherlands in 1747 and was banned from returning to the colony in 1755.

She married in 1754 at the age of 15 to Frans Laurens Willem Grand (1730–1762); he died early, the marriage having produced no children. She inherited the big plantation Grand Plaisir from her late spouse at the age of 23 in 1762. In 1767, she married Frederik Cornelis Stolkert (c. 1747 – c. 1804), son of Elisabeth Buys.

Susanna du Plessis was a successful plantation owner who amassed a fortune from her plantations: despite being a married woman and thus under the guardianship of her husband in contemporary law, she had secured the right to manage her own property in her marriage contract and was thus able to continue to manage the plantation personally after her second marriage in 1767. She divorced her second husband Frederick in 1783, accusing him of cruelty and claiming she feared for her life. She then moved to the capital Paramaribo.

She died in Paramaribo in 1795 and was buried at the gravesite "De Oude Oranjetuin" in Paramaribo. Her tombstone reads: "Finally I have come to rest". It was placed in the floor of the Reformed church in Paramaribo in 1835.

== Legacy ==
Already during her own lifetime, she was mentioned, though not by name, in publications describing the cruelty of slavery, which contributed to the anti-slavery movement. She allegedly drowned the baby of one of her slaves because it wouldn't stop crying. The most famous story about her cruelty is about the mulatto slave concubine of her husband, Alida, whose breasts she allegedly cut off and served to her husband at dinner. There is however no confirmation of any of the stories told about her sadistic treatment of her slaves. It is plausible that she was the subject of a smear campaign by her ex-husband and the governor, who had been a political advisory to her father.

Susanna du Plessis was the object of the play Susanna Duplessis (1963) by Jo Dompig and Eddy Bruma. Her alleged acts of cruelty are also featured in the novel Flarden by Codfried Schreef.

== See also ==
- Anna Jens
