= Jan Jacob Mauricius =

Dutch Governor of Suriname (1742-1751)

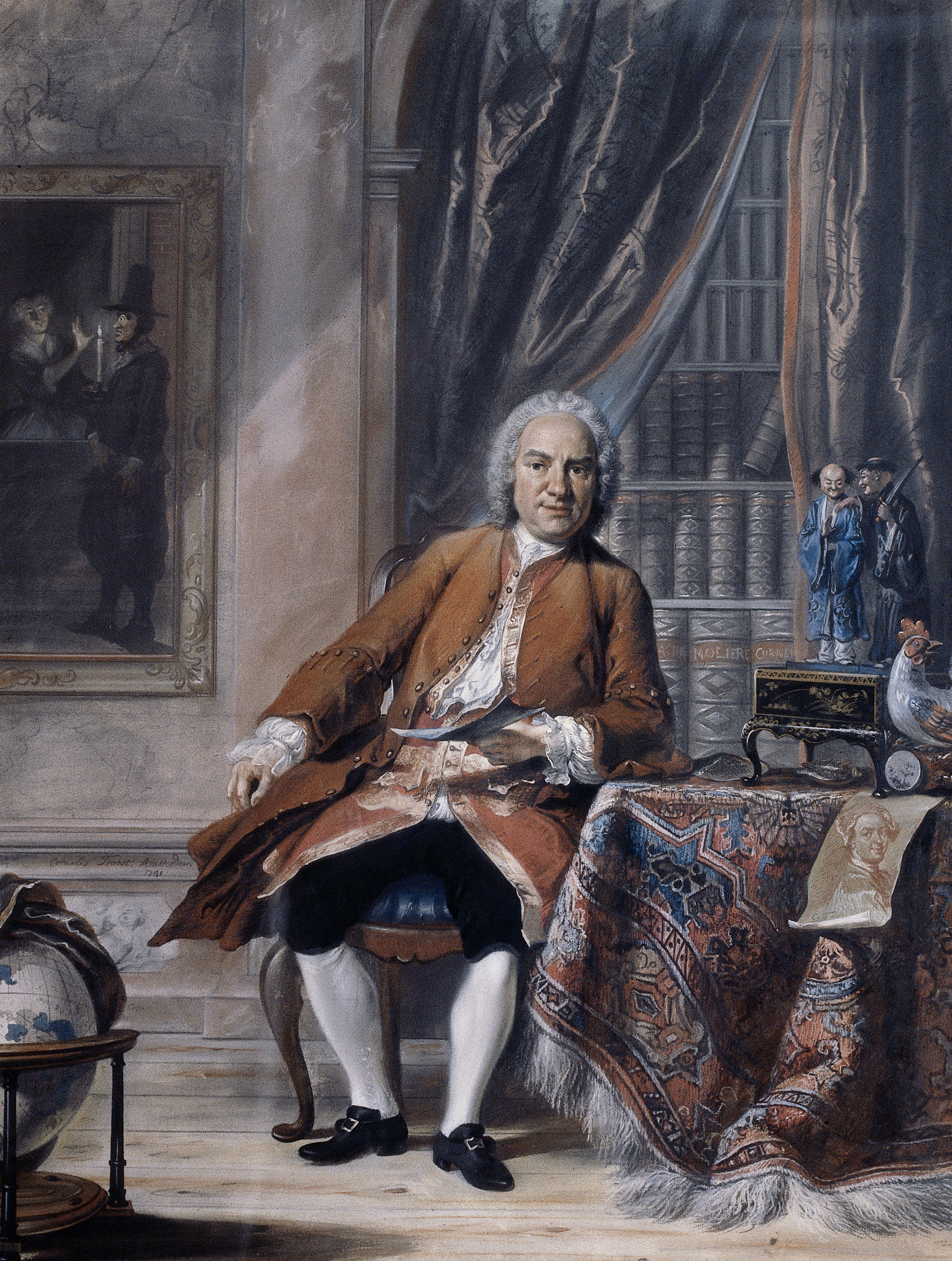
Jan Jacob Mauricius painted by Cornelis Troost

Jan Jacob Mauricius (Amsterdam, 3 May 1692 - Hamburg, 21 March 1768) was a Dutch diplomat, poet, translator and governor of Suriname.

== Life ==
Mauricius produced verses at a young age. He became a student at Leiden on 31 March 1705, gained his doctorate at the age of 16, then settled as a lawyer in The Hague. He became assistant with Isaac van Hoornbeek. Four years later he bought a farm near Nijmegen and had a cattle breeding there on a large scale. In 1714 he settled on a farm in the Beemster.

Because of the influence of wealthy friends, in 1719 he became a board member of Purmerend and the same year he was deputy at the meeting of the States of Holland and West Friesland; in 1725 resident at the Lower Saxon Circle in Hamburg. He was a lover of drama and poetry and became active in the local opera. His third wife came from Hamburg.

In 1742 Mauricius was appointed as governor of Suriname. It has been said that with Mauricius the Enlightenment entered the colony. His nine-year administration was characterized by much opposition from part of the powerful planters, the so-called cabal. The resistance became so bad that even accusations against the States-General were brought against him. He returned in 1751, completely acquitted and honourably discharged.

Probably Mauricius urged during his governorship in Suriname or during his stay in the Republic in 1751 William Gideon Deutz to provide credit to the planters. The credit enabled planters to change creditor. Van Dillen states that the planters could get money too easily. It was forced upon them, as it seems.

Already in 1755, the States General sent him again as a resident to Hamburg, where he died after a painful and prolonged suffering.
