= Johann Heinrich Eckhardt (typographer) =

German typographer and publisher

- Born: Johann Heinrich Eckhardt; 18th century Swedish Pomerania
- Education: University of Greifswald
- Occupations: Typographer and publisher

Johann Heinrich Ekchardt was a German typographer, printer and publisher.

Johann Heinrich Eckhardt was a son of a tenant farmer in Wüst Eldena, he was appointed and sworn in at the University of Greifswald on 10 August 1793 and held the office until 1815. He published 79 works in 139 publications in Latin and German.

== Bibliography ==
All publications are German editions.

- Geschichte Pommerns während dem achtzehnten Jahrhundert, Greifswald 1803
