= Gabriel Anrep =

Swedish genealogist and author (1821–1907)

John Gabriel Anrep
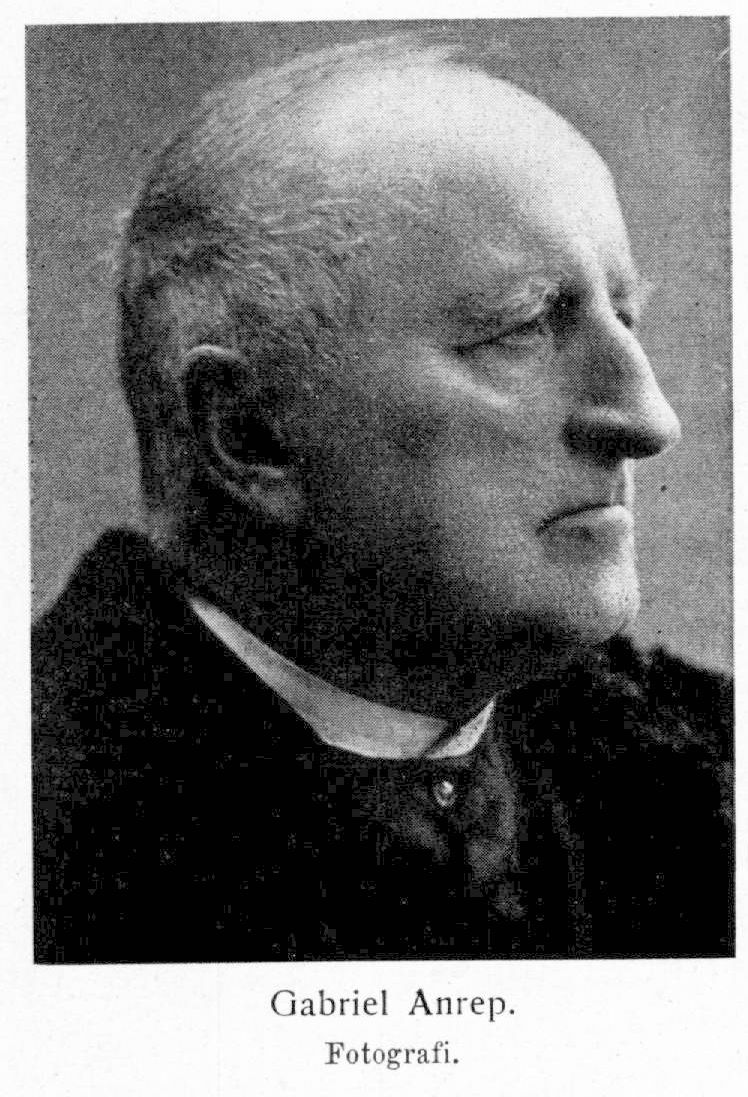
- Anrep circa 1900
- Born: 4 December 1821; Lekeberg Municipality, Sweden
- Died: 12 March 1907 (aged 85); Stockholm, Sweden

John Gabriel Anrep (4 December 1821 – 12 March 1907) was a Swedish genealogist and author.

== Biography ==
He was born on 4 December 1821 in Lekeberg Municipality on the family farm. He moved to Stockholm and was involved in genealogical publishing. He is best known for his history of Swedish nobility in 4 volumes. It was Sweden's first scholarly genealogical work. From 1871 to 1882 he published another set of genealogy books, and the 1900s edition was edited by Gustaf Elgenstierna. In 1854 he started a new set in 27 volumes, containing information up to 1903. He died on 12 March 1907 in Stockholm, Sweden.

== Anrep's nobility genealogy ==
Gillingstam presents documentation that Anrep had personally discarded a lot of earlier parts of family trees of the nobility, for example as being mythical. However, in his series 1858–1864, Nobility Genealogy, 4 volumes, it was a prerequisite from the House of Nobility that in order to use their material, Anrep must follow those (even mythical parts of) family tables strictly – i.e., he was not allowed to discard mythical parts of the pompous pedigrees in his publication. This has been used as criticism against Anrep personally – that he published even mistaken genealogies. Also, his publication has been used as evidence of the truthfulness of those mythical parts of genealogies, on basis of Anrep's authority – although he might personally be appalled to see his name used for such purpose, having himself left personal notes about unreliable portions.

== Publication ==
- Svenska adelns Ättar-taflor utgifna

== See also ==
- Den introducerade svenska adelns ättartavlor
