= Düben collection =

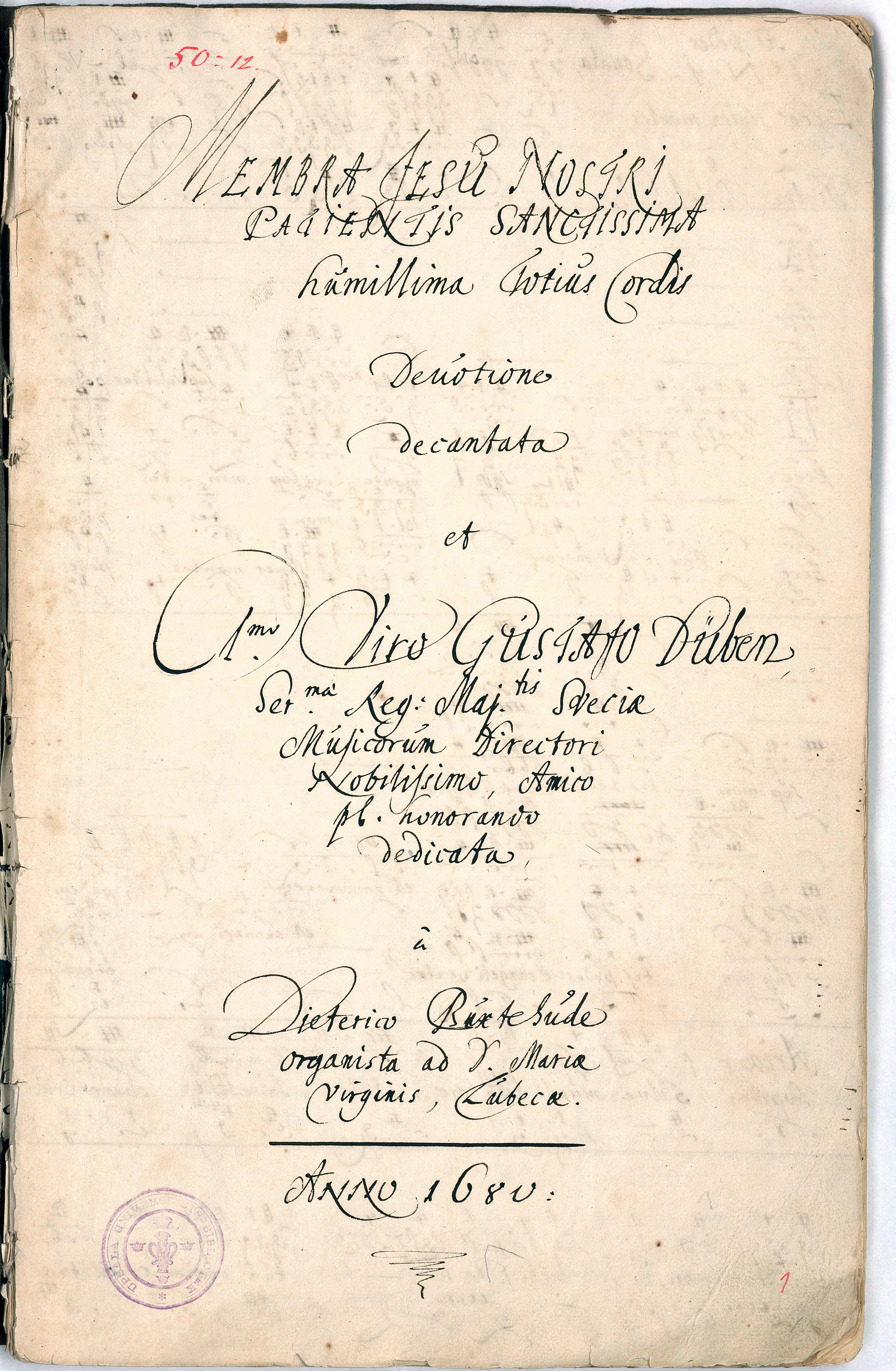
- Buxtehude's Membra Jesu nostri as it appears in the collection
- Also known as: T
- Type: Music manuscript
- Date: c. 1660–1690
- Place of origin: Sweden and north Germany
- Compiled by: Gustaf Düben et al.

The Düben collection is a collection of musical manuscripts named after the original collector, Gustaf Düben, held in the Uppsala University Library. It includes much 17th-century baroque music, in particular the only surviving copies of many works by Dieterich Buxtehude.

== Chronology ==
The collection was compiled starting in the 1640s by Gustaf Düben, and by subsequent members of the family, who held positions at the Swedish Court Chapel. It was ultimately bequeathed to the Uppsala University Library in 1732. Owing to the music it contained being by then mostly out of fashion, it remained there, in neglect but intact, for most of the 18th and 19th centuries. It was ultimately catalogued in the 1880s by librarian Anders Lagerberg, and, upon being noticed by a visiting German musician from Lübeck, gained the attention of musicologists due to it containing copies of previously unknown works by Buxtehude, and later due to its overall significance in assessing 17th-century music history.

A typescript inventory of the vocal works was first made in 1946 by Folke Lindberg; with the instrumental works later catalogued by Erik Kjellberg in 1968. Neither of these were published. The collection was listed in the RISM, along with the rest of Uppsala's music manuscript, starting in 1968. An online catalogue, searchable by composer, work title, key musical characteristics, and, more importantly, digital scans, was made available starting in 2006 based on the work of Erik Kjellberg and Kerala J. Snyder.

== Contents ==
The collections as a whole is mostly the result of the work of its original compiler, who was, in addition to his musical duties, an avid collector. As a whole, it is formed of about 2300 manuscript musical works and around 150 prints. The core, generally considered to be the work of Gustaf Düben the elder, is divided into five volumes of Mottetti e concerti written in tablature and dating from about the 1660s. Italian and German composers are about equally represented, with additional works from France, Poland, England, the Baltic countries and Sweden, representing a total of about 300 composers, with a substantial portion of anonymous contribution. Besides the volumes previously mentioned, the collection includes various loose sheets (sometimes, copies of works found in the main volumes), as well as autograph manuscripts obtained directly through the compiler's personal contacts with leading composers of the era, and a few prints, notably of music by Heinrich Schütz. Düben's two sons, who succeeded him at the beginning of the 18th-century, added works from their time, mostly French opera music influenced by Lully, both printed and manuscript.

As with other surviving North German collections of its time, it contains a breadth of Italian works indicative of the fact that German musicians remained well in touch with Italian church music and its development throughout the 17th century: besides Buxtehude, of whom more than a hundred works (many being unique surviving copies) are present, the collections includes works from Claudio Monteverdi and Giacomo Carissimi, and a large variety of works from the likes of Christoph Bernhard, Andreas Hammerschmidt, Kaspar Förster, Johann Krieger and many others. Two Italian composers who are also well represented in the collection are Marco Giuseppe Peranda and Vincenzo Albrici: both of these musicians from Rome worked in Germany for the majority of their careers and played a significant role in transmitting the Roman style to northern Germany. (Note: For a full listing of Italian composers included, see Webber 1996, pp. 57–58. The complete catalogue is of course available on the site maintained by Upssala University.)

== See also ==
- Düben family

== Sources ==
- Webber, Geoffrey (1996). "The influence of Italian music". North German church music in the age of Buxtehude (2001 reprint ed.). Oxford: Clarendon Press. pp. 43–60. ISBN 0-19-816212-X.
- Kjellberg, Eric, ed. (2010). The dissemination of music in seventeenth-century Europe : celebrating the Düben collection : proceedings from the international conference at Uppsala University 2006. Bern: Peter Lang. ISBN 978-3-0351-0068-6.
- Stiehl, Carl (1889). Die Familie Düben und die Buxtehudeschen Manuscripte auf der Bibliothek zu Uppsala. In: Monatshefte für Musikgeschichte. 21, ZDB-ID 206475-3, pp. 4–9.
