= Henrik Horn's Ingrian campaign =

1578 invasion of Ingria

- Part of the Long Wrath
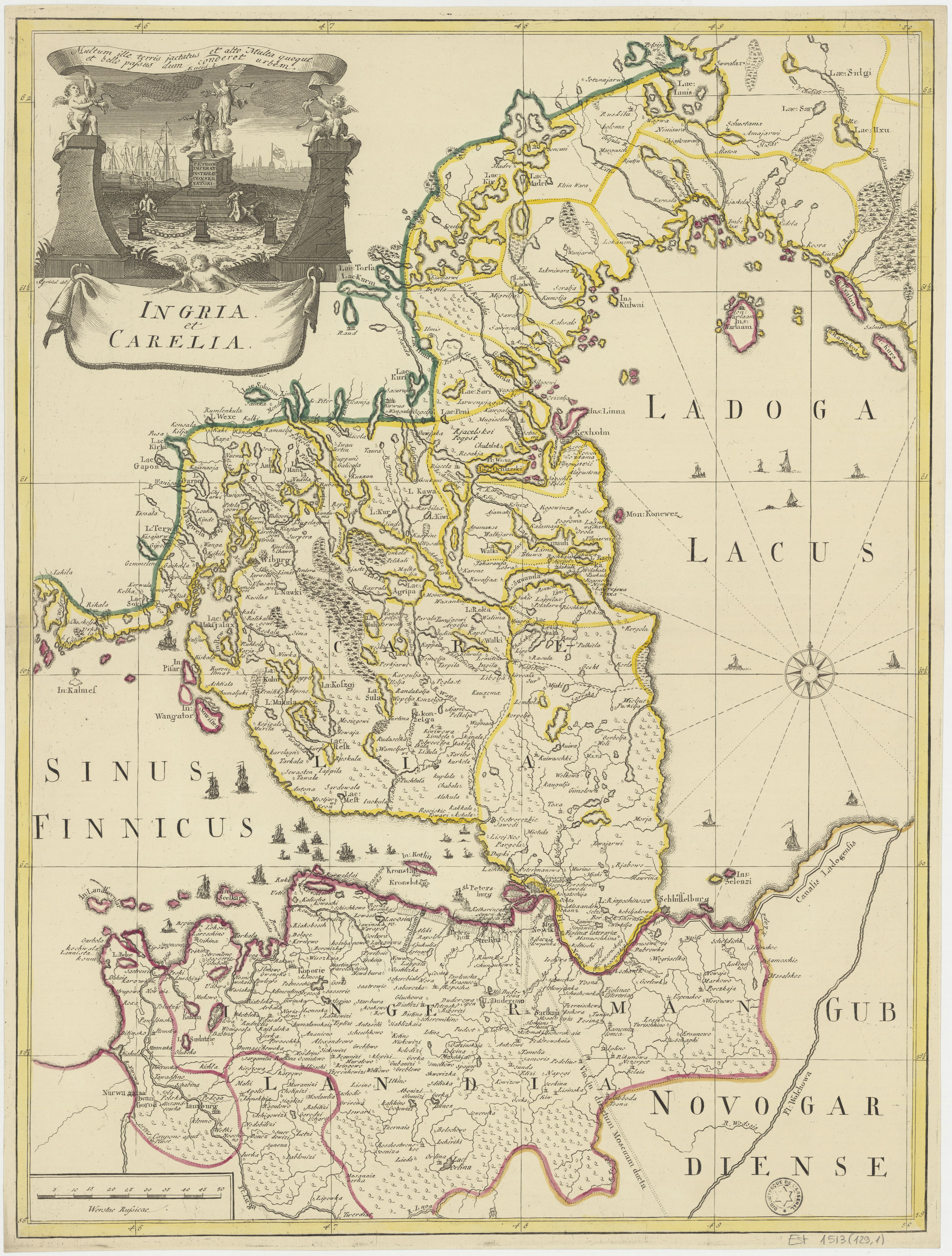
- Map of Ingria by Ivan Grimmel from the 18th century
Date	February 1578
Location	Ingria
Result	Swedish victory
Territorial changes	Large parts of Ingria are ravaged

Belligerents
Sweden	Tsardom of Russia

Commanders and leaders
Henrik Klasson Horn; Karl Henriksson Horn	Unknown

Units involved
Unknown	Unknown

Strength
2,000 soldiers Large amount of peasants	Unknown

Casualties and losses
Unknown	Heavy

Henrik Horn's Ingrian campaign was a successful Swedish campaign into Ingria during the Long Wrath between Sweden and Russia in February of 1578. Henrik Klasson Horn, along with his son and 2,000 men with a large contingent of peasants invaded Ingria, killing anyone they encountered, along with burning houses.

== Background ==
A planned Russian attack on Finland during the winter of 1578 did not take place, and the Tsar, Ivan the Terrible, had returned to Moscow, where he waited. The Swedes decided to strike first than to be struck.

== Campaign ==
In February, the Swedes under Henrik Klasson Horn and his son Karl Henriksson Horn entered Ingria. They brought with them some 2,000 soldiers and a large number of peasants. The soldiers had previously been stationed in Pyttis and Veckelax. As they invaded, the Swedes killed any Russians they encountered, not sparing any women or children along the way. The Swedes also razed houses and the people inside them. Later, Horn also conquered Oberpahlen and razed the suburbs of Dorpat.

== Aftermath ==
After hearing of the invasion, the Swedish king, John III, was enraged and distanced himself from it. Henrik Horn was scolded by John, being ordered to be more cautious in the future. He was told to especially to go easier around the civilian population.

== See also ==
- Swedish invasion of Kexholm (1572) – Invasion of Kexholm in 1572
- Tatar attack into Finland (1577) – 1577 raid into Finland

== Works cited ==
- Landgrén, Lars-Folke (2008). Tvekampen 1521-1611 [The Duel 1521-1611]. Krigen kring Östersjön (in Swedish). Helsinki: Schildts. ISBN 9789515018212.
- Isacson, Claes-Göran (2006). Vägen till stormakt: Vasaättens krig [Road to great power: Wars of the Vasa dynasty] (in Swedish). Norstedts. ISBN 9789113015026.
- Sundberg, Ulf (2010). Sveriges krig 1448-1630 [Sweden's wars 1448-1630] (in Swedish). Svenskt militärhistoriskt bibliotek. ISBN 9789185789627.
- Starbäck, Carl Georg [in Swedish] (1885). "Gustaf Wasa och hans söner". Berättelser ur svenska historien [Stories from Swedish history] (in Swedish). F. & G. Beijers Förlag.
