= Bombardment of Reval (1569) =

Attack on Reval in 1569

- Part of the Northern Seven Years' War
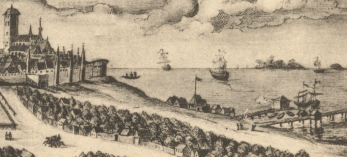
- View of Reval in 1630, from Baltischer Kulturhistorischen Bilder-Atlas
Date	9–22 July 1569
Location	Reval (present-day Tallinn, Estonia) 59°26′14″N 24°44′43″E
Result	See § Aftermath

Belligerents
Sweden	Denmark–Norway; Lübeck

Commanders and leaders
Unknown	Peder Munk; Henrik Gyldenstierne

Units involved
Reval garrison	Unknown

Strength
Unknown	3,000 men Disputed number of ships

Casualties and losses
Several ships plundered and captured	Minimal

The Bombardment of Reval (Swedish: Beskjutningen av Reval) was an attack carried out by a Dano-Lübeckian fleet against the town of Reval (modern-day Tallinn) in 1569 during the Northern Seven Years' War. The attack led to Peder Munk bringing home a large booty from plundering merchant ships. If he had landed his men in time, he would have been able to capture the city as well.

== Bombardment ==
On 9 or 10 July 1569, the Dano-Lübeckian fleet led by Peder Munk and Henrik Gyldenstierne arrived outside of Reval, with estimates of 30 to 40 ships in total or 30 Danish and 7 Lübeckian ships. Their objective was to capture a cargo fleet sailing from Narva to Reval. Thanks to a fog, they were able to sail close to the city without being detected, and when the fog dissipated, the fleet sailed closer, preparing for battle. The port to the city was open, and if Munk landed his 3,000 men, he would have been able to capture the city. However, he refused, as he did not want to take any risks.

Since he was not aware of how weak Reval's defenses were, he did not storm it. Instead, he sent a request for the governor to negotiate capitulation terms, which the governor responded to by requesting time to deliberate for a day. The people in Reval used the time to pull heavy cannons to the walls and reinforce those facing the sea. These cannons subsequently began bombarding the fleet.

After reinforcing the walls, the city became equal in strength to the fleet, and thus could no longer fall to it, and when the city refused to capitulate after the time was up, Munk decided to focus on plundering, and they took the cargo from the ships in the harbor which was some 50 ships loaded with hemp, tar, and grain, along with plundering the entire cargo fleet from Narva.

== Aftermath ==
Due to Munk's caution, the fleet suffered minimal damage, and after two weeks, he sailed away from Reval on 22 July with large amounts of booty and several ships to Copenhagen. Ships that weren't worth much were burned.

The result of the bombardment is disputed, with some historians calling it successful, and others calling it unsuccessful.

== See also ==
- Siege of Reval (1570–1571) – Siege of Reval in 1570
- Siege of Reval (1577) – Siege of Reval in 1577

== Works cited ==
- Lindbergh, Katarina (2022). Nordiska sjuårskriget [Nordic Seven Years' War] (in Swedish). Historiska Media. ISBN 9789180500951.
- Isacson, Claes-Göran (2006). Vägen till stormakt: Vasaättens krig [Road to great power: Wars of the Vasa dynasty] (in Swedish). Norstedts. ISBN 9789113015026.
- Annerstedt, Thure (1877). Svenska Väldet i Livland [Swedish Realm in Livonia] (in Swedish). Göteborgs Handestidnings Aktiebolags Tryckeri.
- Vaupell, Otto (1891). Den Nordiske Syvaarskrig [The Northern Seven Years' War] (in Danish). C.A. Reitzels.
- Alin, Oscar Josef (1877). Sveriges nydaningstid: från år 1521 till år 1611 [Sweden's Renaissance: from the year 1521 to the year 1611] (in Swedish). Linnströms.
