= Klas Henriksson (Horn) =

Swedish jurist and statesman (c. 1445 – c. 1520)

Klas Henriksson (Finnish: Klaus Henrikinpoika; c. 1440 – c. 1520) of Horn family was one of the most prominent noblemen in late medieval Finland, which at the time was part of the Swedish realm. He served as justiciar (lagman) of southern Finland from 1487 until his death, and was appointed to the Swedish Privy Council in 1488. Over the course of a career spanning nearly five decades, he became widely regarded as one of the foremost legal authorities of his time.

== Origins and estates ==
Klas was the only surviving son of Henrik Olofsson (Horn), a squire (väpnare) and lord of Joensuu Manor in Halikko, and Cecilia Klausdotter, the daughter of Klas Lydekesson Diekn, a wealthy and long-serving castellan of Turku Castle (1416–1434). On his father's side, the family had belonged to the Finnish lower nobility since at least the 14th century and received confirmation of noble status and tax exemption from King Erik of Pomerania in 1407. Their coat of arms bore the image of a drinking horn, from which the family name Horn was later derived. Klas himself never used a surname.

Through his mother, Klas inherited a portion of Kankainen Manor in Masku, a major estate in southwest Finland. He acquired full control of it after his sister's death. From his father, he inherited Joensuu Manor, and through his first wife, daughter of the justiciar Kristiern Frille, he gained access to the Haapaniemi Manor in Kisko. His second wife, Kristina Jakobsdotter, brought him lands in Vehkalahti, within the Margraviate of Viborg. By the end of his life, Klas Henriksson was one of the wealthiest landowners in Finland.

== Legal and political career ==
In 1472, Klas succeeded his father-in-law Kristiern Frille as district judge of Halikko and likely held this office until his death. In 1487, he was appointed lagman of Southern Finland, the highest legal office in the country, which he retained for over three decades.

He became a Privy Councillor (riksråd) in 1488. Although he rarely attended meetings in Sweden, he was active in political life, especially during succession disputes and union crises. He participated in the election of Christian II as successor to King Hans in 1499 and later acknowledged the appointments of regents Svante Nilsson and Sten Sture the Younger on behalf of Finnish nobility.

Though he initially supported attempts to renew the Kalmar Union with Denmark and joined the pro-union 1512 Malmö alliance, he eventually shifted allegiance to the anti-unionist Sture party. In this, he mirrored the broader trend of Finnish magnates pragmatically adjusting to shifting political winds.

== Role in military affairs ==
Klas Henriksson played a key role in Swedish–Russian relations during the Russo-Swedish wars and border disputes. During the Russo-Swedish War of 1495–1497, he helped organize defenses on the Kymijoki River and was involved in later diplomatic efforts with Muscovy. In 1509, he was selected to travel to Novgorod for peace negotiations, but talks were aborted when the Russians refused safe conduct.

In 1511, despite his advanced age, Klas was entrusted with military and administrative responsibilities in Viborg (Viipuri, Vyborg), the eastern bulwark of the realm. He oversaw the transition of control after the death of Erik Turesson Bielke, working under the dowager Gunilla Bese.

== Family ==
In 1470, the young nobleman Klas Henriksson received a papal dispensation to marry Kristina Kristiernsdotter Frille (born before c. 1455, died before 1508), his second cousin and the daughter of Privy Councillor Kristiern Frille, lagman of Southern Finland. Through this marriage, Klas gained rights to the Teijo and Haapaniemi estates in southwestern Finland, of which Kristina was co-heiress.

After Kristina's death, Klas remarried around 1511, likely during his tenure in Viborg, where he was stationed as a royal commander and interim administrator of the province. His second wife was Kristina Jakobsdotter (born before 1495, died c. 1553), heiress to the Töytärinhovi estate and to numerous farms in Vehkalahti, as well as properties in the Hietakylä harbor and Salmenkylä village. After Klas' death, she lived as Dowager of Haapaniemi, which became her principal residence. Around 1531, she remarried.

According to research by historian Kaarlo Blomstedt, the most likely time of Klas Henriksson's death was in the summer of 1520.

At least three of his children left surviving descendants. From his first marriage, Krister Klasson (Horn) (d. 1520), castellan and military commander, and his sister Birgitta (also known as Kirsti or Piriitta), married to a member of the Jägerhorn af Spurila family, both continued the family line. His second marriage produced one son, Henrik Klasson Horn (born c. 1512, died 1595), who rose to prominence as a justiciar, governor, and field marshal. These two sons, Krister and Henrik, became the progenitors of the two principal branches of the Horn family: the Horn af Åminne line and the Horn af Kanckas line.
