= 1571 in Sweden =

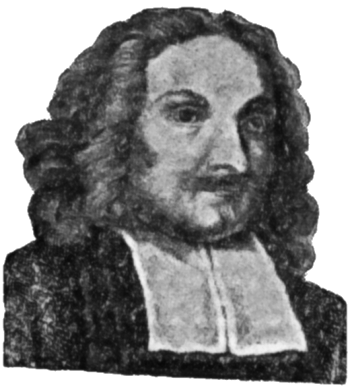
Laurentius Petri (Nericius), Archbishop of Uppsala, SBH

Events from the year 1571 in Sweden

== Incumbents ==
- Monarch – John III

== Events ==
- 16 march - The Russian Siege of Reval in Swedish Estonia ends.
- March - Swedish victory over the Russians in the Battle of Ubagall.
- August - The deposed monarch and his family is taken to Åland.
- October - The deposed monarch and his family is taken to Gripsholm Castle.
- - A tax is introduced in order to pay the Danish ransom of Älvsborg.
- - The church order of Laurentius Petri is finally accepted.
- - The education system is officially transferred to the Lutheran Church from the former Catholic church.
- - The creation of the Swedish Church Ordinance 1571, the first complete order of the Protestant Swedish church. The church ordinance also includes a chapter about schooling, in which all children in the cities, regardless of sex, are to be given elementary schooling.
- - The ban from 1560 is retracted and the church are permitted to baptize, marry and bury the Romani.
- - The church ordinance declare that a son or son-in-law of a priest should be chosen first to succeed him as parish vicar.

== Births ==
- Anders Bure, cartographer

== Deaths ==
- Gustaf Olofsson Stenbock, nobleman and freiherr
