= Tatar raid in Nyland (1577) =

1577 raid into Finland

Tatar attack into Finland
- Part of the Livonian War
- Map of Nyland (Uusimaa) from 1919
Date	January or February 1577
Location	Nyland (modern-day Uusimaa)
Result	Inconclusive
Territorial changes	Southern Finland is ravaged

Belligerents
Sweden	Tsardom of Russia; Tatars

Commanders and leaders
Petter Severinsson Juusten; Johannes Berndes; Herman Fleming; Martin Johansson Boije	Mstislavskij

Units involved
Force at Porkala	Unknown

Strength
Unknown	1,200 cavalry

Casualties and losses
Many captured	Heavy

The Tatar attack into Finland occurred in January or February 1577 in conjunction with the siege of Reval during the Livonian War, when around 1,200 Russo–Tatar and possibly Mongol cavalry went over the ice to Nyland (modern-day Uusimaa) in southern Finland and raided the countryside.

== Background ==
Despite previous truces, with the most recent one having been extended by two years in 1575, raids over the Russo–Finnish border persisted from both sides during the years 1574–1576. From northern Kexholm, the Karelians undertook two raids, in 1574 and 1575 respectively over the border and over to Ule swamp.

=== Russian plan ===
The attack had several strategic goals, one of which was to plunder Reval's support areas in order to weaken it, in other words the coast of Nyland. According to Werner Tawastjerna, Ivan the Terrible had decided to attack when he heard that Finland was a part of the Reval area and if Russia captured the city it would belong to Russia.

== Attack ==
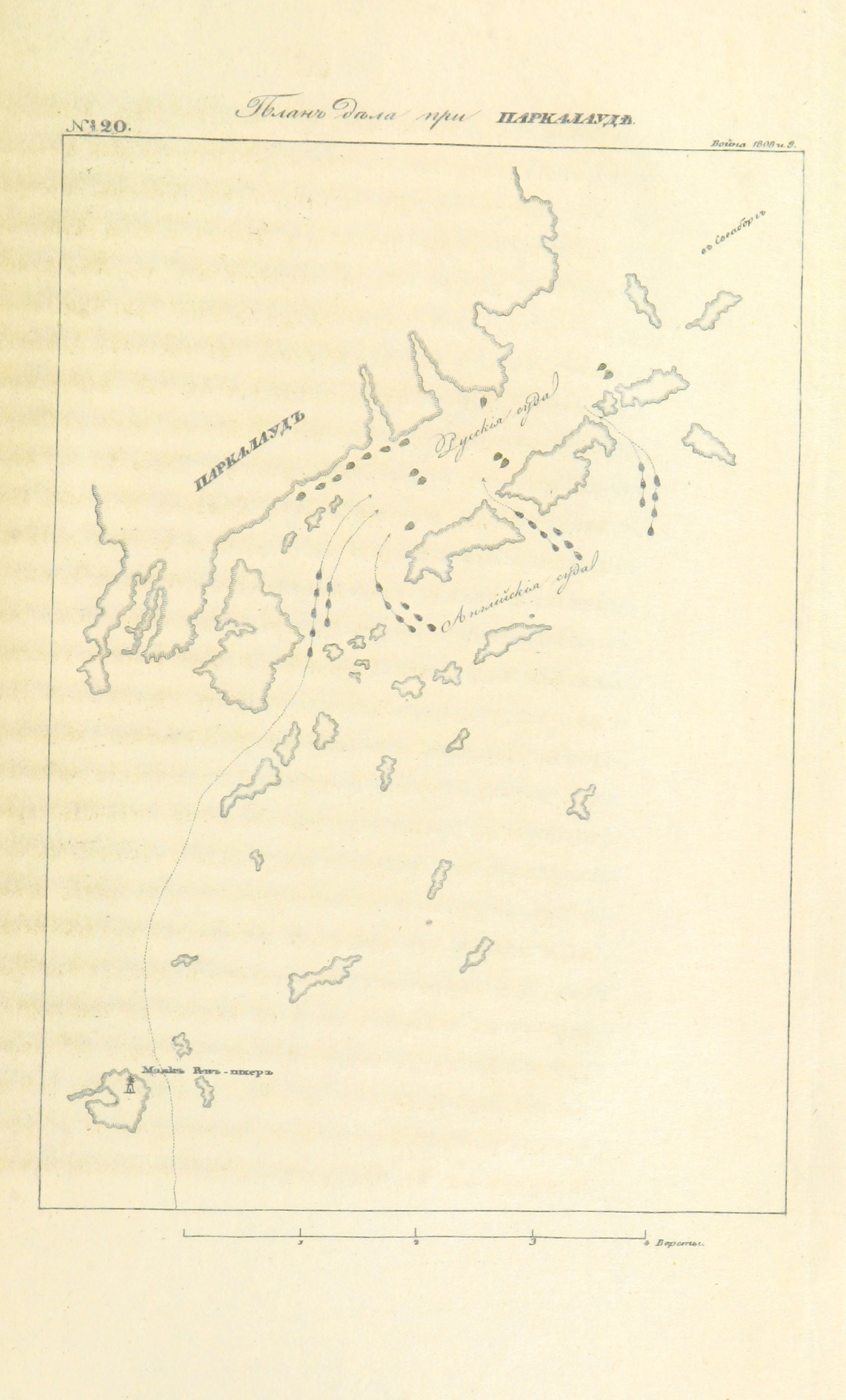
Map of Porkala from 1841 by Mikhailovsky-Danilevsky

In conjunction with the start of the Russian siege of Reval in 1577, some 1,200 Russo-Tatar and possibly Mongol cavalry under Prince Mstislavskij rode over the ice to Nyland in January or February, going from Reval to the island of Mjölö (Isosaari). When the Tatars arrived, high winds and ice prevented them from attacking Helsinki, and instead they sent a detachment of 200 men to Porkala, where they suffered damage. Additionally, they encountered troops under Petter Severinsson Juusten and Johannes Berndes, who managed to eventually repel the cavalry with a few cannons.

After the skirmish at Porkala, the Swedish troops there went to Helsinki to reinforce it, which was further reinforced by a fähnlein of men from Duke Charles, along with troops from Viborg under the command of Herman Fleming.

After staying idle for a week, the Tatars split into smaller groups and raided the countryside of Nyland, during which they attacked Borgå, Sibbo, Esbo, Kyrkslätt, Sjundeå, and Ingå. During these attacks, they plundered, murdered, and burned. Along with this, they systematically imprisoned children and transported them to the main Russian army besieging Reval. Despite Fleming having a large amount of cavalry and knights under his command, the Tatars had spread out in the countryside and it was increasingly difficult for him to relieve the province. The most affected was Helsinge and Sibbo, where the Tatars razed a large amount of villages and captured many people.

Despite the difficulties, the Finnish and peasant troops put up successful resistance. One of the most distinguished was Martin Johansson Boije, who had killed a considerable number of Tatars in an attack, with the Tatars losing around half of their force.

== Aftermath ==
After finishing their raids, the Tatars returned over the ice to Reval. They brought with them many captives, and those that could not follow were killed. The Russians had also stolen everything they could get their hands on, including cattle, axes and pots, cloths and skins, clothes, silver, and grain.

=== Memory ===
The memories of the Tatar raid lives on in the population of Uusimaa, who tell of the Tatar's "rawness and bloodlust". These fears are exacerbated by the fact that the attack came as a surprise, during a time where Sweden and Russia had a truce.

== See also ==
- Swedish invasion of Kexholm (1572) – Invasion of Kexholm in 1572
- Henrik Horn's Ingrian campaign – 1578 invasion of Ingria

== Works cited ==
- Landgrén, Lars-Folke (2008). Tvekampen 1521-1611 [The Duel 1521-1611]. Krigen kring Östersjön (in Swedish). Helsinki: Schildts. ISBN 9789515018212.
- Huhtamies, Mikko (2023). "Iskrig". historia.hel.fi. Historia Helsingfors.
- Nikander, Gabriel (1928). Herrgårdar i Finland [Manors in Finland] (in Swedish). Vol. 2. Söderström.
- Wrangel, Ewert (1938). Svenska folket genom tiderna: Den äldre Vasatiden [The Swedish people through the ages: The later Vasa period] (in Swedish). Tidskriftsförlaget Allhem.
- Mankell, Julius (1870). Anteckningar rörande finska arméens och Finlands krigshistoria [Notes on the military history of the Finnish Army and Finland] (in Swedish). Norstedts.
