= Arvid Horn =

Swedish politician, general, and diplomat (1664–1742)

Count Arvid Horn
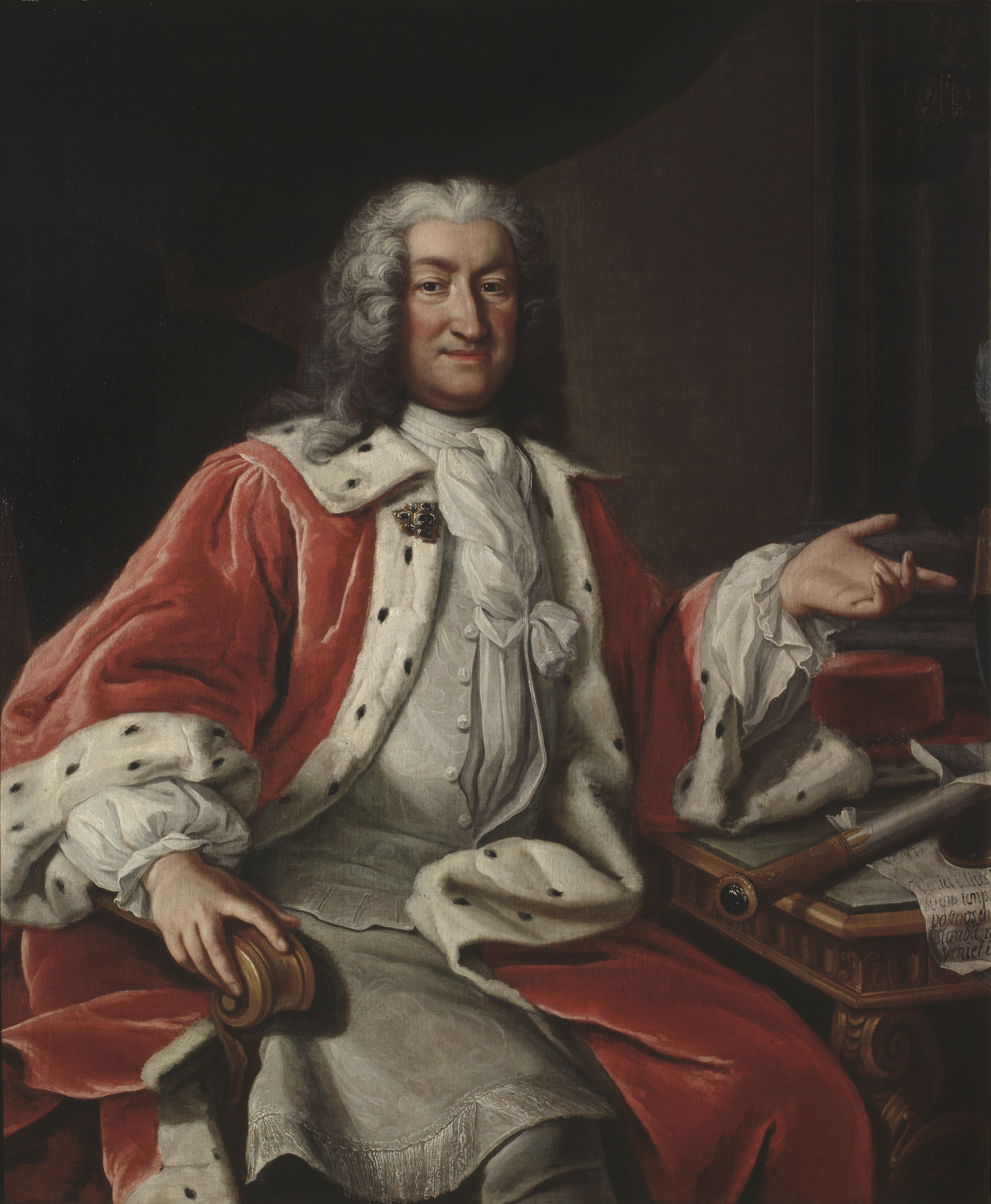
- Portrait by Lorens Pasch the Elder

President of Privy Council Chancellery of Sweden
- In office 1710–1719
- Preceded by: Nils Gyldenstolpe
- Succeeded by: Gustaf Cronhielm

President of Privy Council Chancellery of Sweden
- In office 1720–1738
- Preceded by: Gustaf Cronhielm
- Succeeded by: Carl Gyllenborg

Personal details
- Born: 6 April 1664 Vuorentaka Manor in Halikko, Finland
- Died: 18 April 1742 (aged 78) Ekebyholm Manor, Norrtälje, Sweden
- Party: Caps (mössorna)
- Spouse(s): Anna Beata Ehrensteen (married 1696); Inga Törnflycht (married 1705); Margareta Gyllenstierna (married 1711)

Military service
- Allegiance: Sweden
- Rank: Lieutenant General
- Battles/wars: Great Northern War

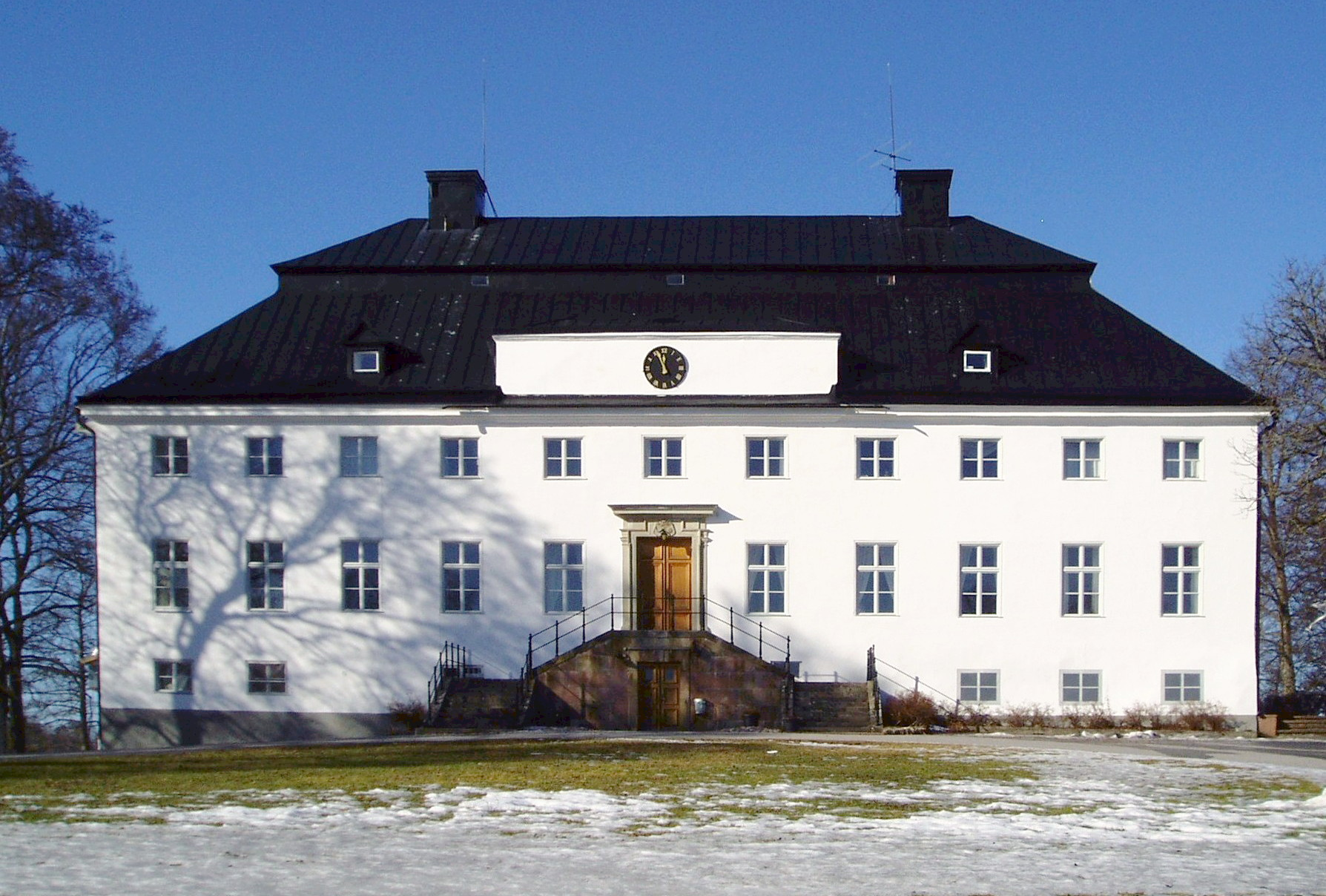
Ekebyholm Manor (Ekebyholms slott)

Count Arvid Bernhard Horn af Ekebyholm (6 April 1664 – 18 April 1742) was a Swedish general, diplomat and politician, a member of the noble Horn family. He served twice as president of the privy council chancellery (1710–1719 and 1720–1738) and was one of the leading figures of the Swedish Age of Liberty.

== Soldier and diplomat ==
Arvid Bernhard Horn was born at Vuorentaka Manor in Halikko (now Salo, Finland). He was the son of Gustaf Horn af Kanckas (1627–1673) and his wife Anna Helena von Gertten (1640–1709). After completing his studies at the Royal Academy of Turku, he entered the Royal Swedish Army and served for several years in the Netherlands, in Hungary under Prince Eugene of Savoy (1663–1736), and in Flanders under Prince Georg Friedrich of Waldeck (1690–1695).

Horn stood high in the favour of King Charles XII of Sweden and was one of his foremost generals in the earlier part of the Great Northern War, being the captain lieutenant over the Drabant Corps since 1696. In 1704 he was entrusted with his first diplomatic mission, the deposition of Augustus II, Elector of Saxony and the election of King Stanislaus I, King of Poland. This mission. he accomplished with distinguished ability but absolute unscrupulousness. Shortly afterwards he was besieged by Augustus in Warsaw and compelled to surrender.

== Politician ==
In 1705 Horn was made a privy councillor and in 1706 a count. In 1708, he was given oversight of Charles XII's nephew, Charles Frederick, Duke of Holstein-Gottorp (1700–1739), who was under the guardianship of his grandmother Hedwig Eleonora of Holstein-Gottorp (1636–1715) following the death of his mother Hedvig Sophia of Sweden (1681–1708).

In 1710 Horn succeeded Nils Gyldenstolpe as president of the privy council chancellery. Transferred to the central point of the administration, he had ample opportunity of regarding with other eyes the situation of the kingdom, and in consequence of his remonstrances he fell rapidly in the favour of Charles XII. Both in 1710 and 1713 Horn was in favour of summoning the Estates, but when in 1714 the diet adopted an anti-monarchical attitude, he gravely warned and ultimately dissolved it. In Charles XII's later years Horn had little to do with the administration. After the death of Charles XII, in 1718 it was Horn who persuaded Princess Ulrika Eleonora of Sweden (1688–1741) to be elected Queen of Sweden after she had agreed to renounce the powers of absolute monarchy established by her father, King Charles XI. However, he later protested against the queen's autocratic behaviour and resigned from the privy council.

== President of the privy council ==
Horn was elected lantmarskalk, for the Caps Party (Mössorna) at the Riksdag of 1720, and contributed, on the resignation of Ulrika Eleonora, to the election of Frederick of Hesse as king of Sweden, whose first act was to restore to him to the privy council and as president of its chancellery, in effect as prime minister. For the next eighteen years he so absolutely controlled both the foreign and the domestic affairs of Sweden that the period between 1720 and 1738 has well been called the Horn period.

Horn's strong hand kept the inevitable strife of the parliamentary factions within due limits, and it was entirely owing to his provident care that Sweden so rapidly recovered from the wretched condition in which the wars of Charles XII had plunged her. In his foreign policy Horn was extremely wary and cautious, yet without compromising either the independence or the self-respect of his country. He was, however, the promoter of a new principle of administration which in later days proved very dangerous to Sweden under ministers less capable than he was.

This was to increase the influence of the Riksdag of the Estates and its secret committees in the solution of purely diplomatic questions, which should have been left entirely to the executive, thus weakening the central government and at the same time facilitating the interference of foreign Powers in Sweden's domestic affairs. Not till 1731 was there any appearance of opposition to Horn's "system"; but Horn, piqued by the growing coolness of the king, the same year offered his resignation, which was not accepted.

In 1734, however, the opposition denounced his neutrality on the occasion of the War of the Polish Succession, when Stanislaus I of Poland again appeared upon the scene as a candidate for the Polish throne; but Horn still was able to prevent a rupture with Russia. Henceforth he was accused (Note: Bain (1911) characterizes these accusations as unjust. He also suggests "Horn in many respects greatly resembled his English contemporary Robert Walpole. The peculiar situation of Sweden, and the circumstances of his time, made his policy necessarily opportunist, but it was an opportunism based on excellent common sense.") of want of patriotism, and in 1738 was compelled at last to retire before the triumphant young Hats Party (Hattarna).

For the remainder of his life, Horn lived in retirement at his estate at Ekebyholm Manor (Ekebyholms slott) at Norrtälje.

== Notes ==
Preceded by Nils Gyldenstolpe	President of the Privy Council; 1710–1719	Succeeded by Gustaf Cronhielm
Preceded by Gustaf Cronhielm	President of the Privy Council; 1720–1738	Succeeded by Carl Gyllenborg
Preceded by Reinhold Johan von Fersen	Governor of Västerbotten County; 1692	Succeeded by Gustaf Douglas
