= Swedish invasion of Kexholm (1572) =

Invasion of Kexholm in 1572

- Part of the Long Wrath
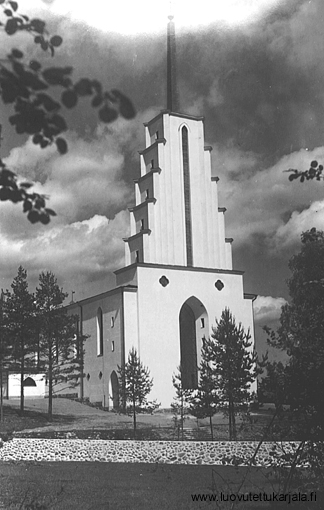
- The Lutheran Church at Äyräpää, built in 1934.
Date	December 1572 – 8 January 1573
Location	Kexholm, Nöteborg, Neva
Result	Swedish victory
Territorial changes	Kexholm is ravaged

Belligerents
Sweden	Tsardom of Russia

Commanders and leaders
Herman Fleming	Unknown

Units involved
Force from Viborg	Unknown

Strength
3,000–15,000 men	Unknown

Casualties and losses
Unknown	Heavy

The Swedish invasion of Kexholm occurred during the Long Wrath between Russia and Sweden from late 1572 to early 1573. A Swedish force from Viborg under the command of Herman Fleming entered Kexholm, destroying almost all of the 400 buildings there, along with killing anyone they encountered.

== Background ==
Earlier in the 1560s, Herman Fleming had been commander of Weissenstein in Estonia on many occasions, and at the start of the Long Wrath the commander of Viborg (modern-day Vyborg). However, this post was handed to Henrik Klasson Horn and Erik Håkansson Slang. Fleming's forces were also significantly weakened in the autumn, when parts of it were sent to Livland and Sweden. However, the amount of cavalry was increased. Eventually, Horn was replaced by Gustaf Banér, who was also quickly replaced by Fleming as commander of the forces in Finland after John III was dissatisfied with his inactivity during the spring.

== Invasion ==
In late December, Fleming marched from Viborg with 3,000–15,000 men, most of them being cavalry. He marched along Äyräpää into Kexholm, plundering all the way to Korela Fortress. He burned the surrounding town on both sides of the Vuoksi river, along with a harbour warehouse and a monastery. During the invasion, most of the 400 buildings in Kexholm were destroyed. After, Fleming went towards Kronoborg (Kurkijoki) where the Swedes razed the village along with a church and two monasteries. Fleming's men went along Ladoga's shore, razing villages and killing anyone they encountered. The men usually managed to escape with skii's, while women, children, and the elderly were killed. Fleming eventually returned to Viborg on 8 January 1573 having completed his objective after a raid into Nöteborg county and all the way to the Neva.

== Aftermath ==
Soon after the attack, a Russian force of a few thousand men invaded Koporye county, but the invasion failed, with thousands of Russians being killed, along with several boyars being captured.

== See also ==
- Tatar attack into Finland (1577) – 1577 raid into Finland
- Henrik Horn's Ingrian campaign – 1578 invasion of Ingria

== Works cited ==
- Landgrén, Lars-Folke (2008). Tvekampen 1521-1611 [The Duel 1521-1611]. Krigen kring Östersjön (in Swedish). Helsinki: Schildts. ISBN 9789515018212.
- Anthoni, Eric [in Swedish] (1964–1966). "Herman Fleming". sok.riksarkivet.se. National Archives of Sweden.
- Schybergson, Magnus Gottfrid [in Finnish] (1887). Finlands historia [History of Finland] (in Swedish). Vol. 1. Helsinki: G. W. Edlund.
