= Gustaf Cronhielm =

Swedish nobleman and politician

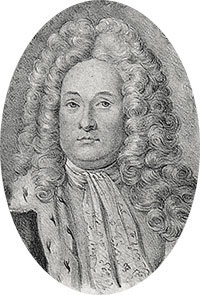
- Lithography 1847

President of Privy Council Chancellery of Sweden
- In office 1719–1719
- Preceded by: Arvid Horn
- Succeeded by: Arvid Horn

Personal details
- Born: 18 July 1664 Stockholm, Sweden
- Died: 3 June 1737 (aged 73) Stockholm, Sweden
- Spouse(s): Maria Wallenstedt (married 1693); Henrietta Beata Horn (married 1725)

Gustaf Cronhielm (18 July 1664, Stockholm – 3 June 1737) was a Swedish nobleman and politician. He was Governor of Västmanland County 1698–1710.
