= Karl Henriksson Horn =

Swedish statesman (1550–1601)

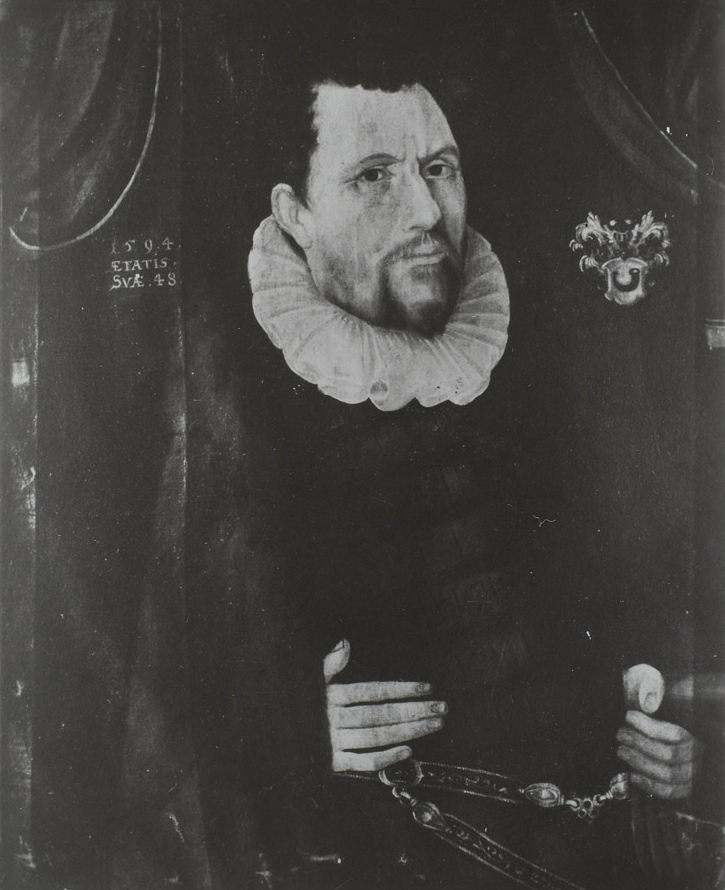
Painting of Karl Henriksson Horn in 1594, possibly by Johan Baptista van Uther

Karl Henriksson Horn of Kanckas (Finnish: Kaarle Henrikinpoika; 1550 – 16 May 1601) was a Swedish field marshal and statesman.

== Biography ==
Karl was a member of the Finnish-Swedish noble family Horn af Kanckas. He was a son of the Swedish statesman Henrik Klasson Horn (1512–1595) and Elin Arvidsdotter, née Stålarm (d. 1577). Carl married Agneta von Dellwig (d. 1611) in Reval (Tallinn) in 1577. The marriage produced five daughters and six sons, including:

- Henrik (1578–1618), Swedish diplomat and Marshal of the Realm
- Klas (1583–1632), Governor-General of Swedish Pomerania
- Evert (1585–1615), Swedish Field Marshal
- Gustav, Count of Björneborg (1592–1657), Swedish Field Marshal.

Horn was born in Finland and later became a field commander and Lagman in his homeland.

He played an important role in the Livonian War, distinguishing himself in the Defense of Reval in 1570 and the subsequent Battle of Ubagall in March 1571. He was also in command, together with his father Henrik Klasson Horn, during the Defense of Reval in 1577. He was sub-commander of Pontus De la Gardie in the campaigns against Narva in 1579 and 1581.

Horn was Swedish governor of Reval and Swedish governor of Estonia from January 1576 to May 1578, and again from 1600 until his death.
In between, on 19 February 1590 he was attacked at Narva by the Russians in the Russo-Swedish War (1590–1595) and was compelled to sign an armistice, which obliged Sweden to surrender the territories won by the Treaty of Plussa. For this, he was proclaimed a traitor by King John III of Sweden, and imprisoned at Örbyhus Castle until the death of King John III in 1592.

After his release, he supported the Protestant Duke Charles against the Catholic King Sigismund III Vasa in the War against Sigismund (1598–1599). He was mortally wounded at the beginning of the campaign against Poland and died in the Burtnieki Castle. His tomb is preserved in St. Mary's Cathedral, Tallinn.
