= Wickiana =

16th-century Swiss broadsheets

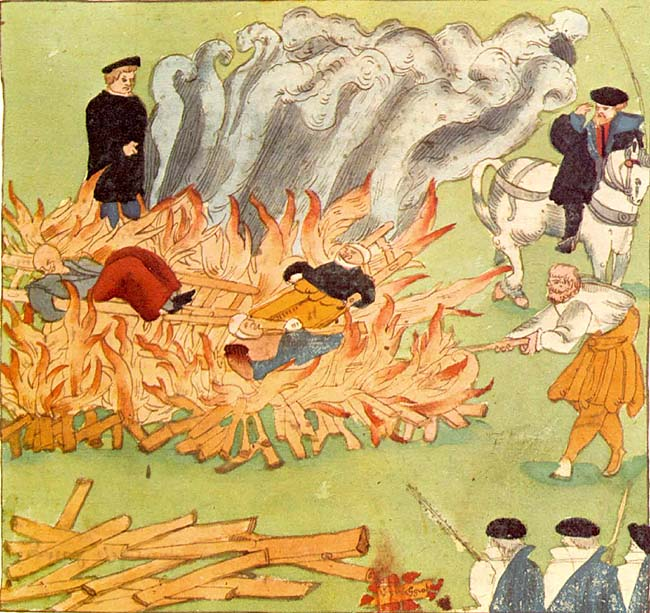
Burning of three witches in Baden (1585).

The Wickiana is recognized as one of the most significant collections of news reports and documents pertaining to current events dating from the 16th century in the form of single-leaf and illustrated broadsheets, pamphlets, prints, handwritten texts and drawings. These time capsules form one of the most important archives pertaining to a particular epoch, namely that of the Reformation in Switzerland. Johann Jakob Wick (1522–1588), after whom the collection is named, was the clergyman at the Predigerkirche and its associated hospital in Zürich from 1552 and then second Archdeacon, and thus also canon, at the Grossmünster in Zürich from 1557. He assembled and arranged contemporary news documents chronologically between 1559 and 1588, also integrating further material from the period running approximately from 1505 until 1559 into his collection.

== Contents ==
Wick's collection is bound in 24 folio volumes, which were housed in the Grossmünster Stiftsbibliothek after Wick's death in 1588 and subsequently transferred to the Zürich Stadtbibliothek in 1836. In addition to a vast number of prints from the German-speaking countries, the collection also contains 52 items in other languages. Many of the sheets emanate from the most important centres for printing and book production at that period – Augsburg, Nürnberg and Strassburg.

In pictures and texts, the documents bear witness to contemporary life, reporting on such phenomena as natural occurrences – comets, earthquakes and floods, physical deformities in animals and humans, sensational crimes and political events of the time. For example, the comet of 1577 is described as “terrible and wondrous” (“schrecklich und wunderbarlich”). The collection can be regarded as manifesting the climate of crisis at a time of religious and political turmoil: Huldrych Zwingli (died 1531) had recently predicted the end of the world. Wick's collection of documents may have been regarded by him and his contemporaries as harbingers of the Last Judgment.

== Access ==
439 illustrated broadsheets (woodcuts), 429 of which belong to the original collection. 10 were added later. In 1925, these illustrated broadsheets were removed from Johann Jakob Wick's manuscript volumes and archived separately in the Department of Prints and Drawings of the Zentralbibliothek Zürich (Graphische Sammlung). All the rest of the documents, Wick's entire collection, are housed in the Department of Manuscripts in the Zentralbibliothek Zürich (Handschriftenabteilung).

== See also ==
- Swiss illustrated chronicles
- History of Zürich
- Historiography of Switzerland
- Reformation in Switzerland

== Examples ==
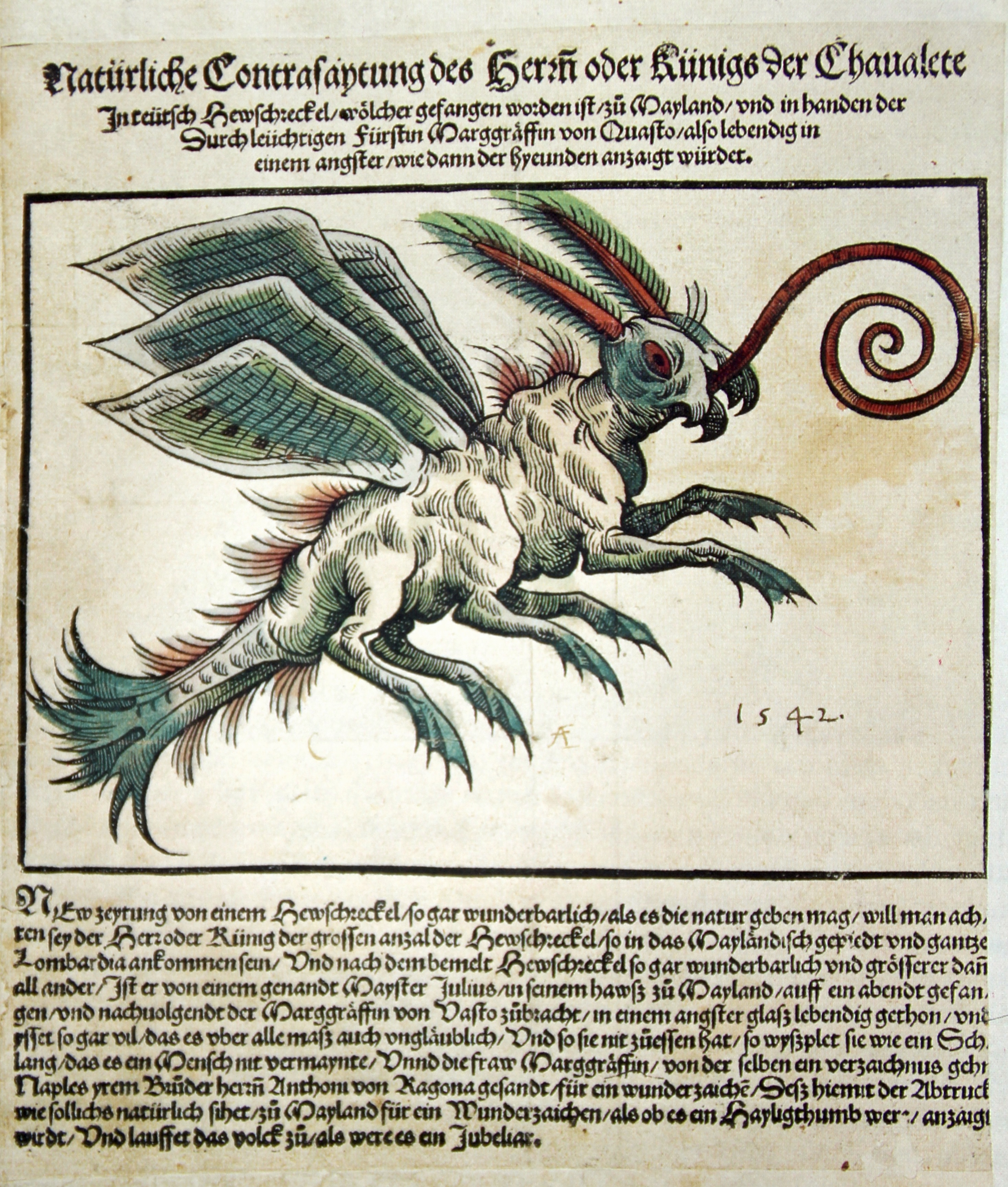
Grasshopper

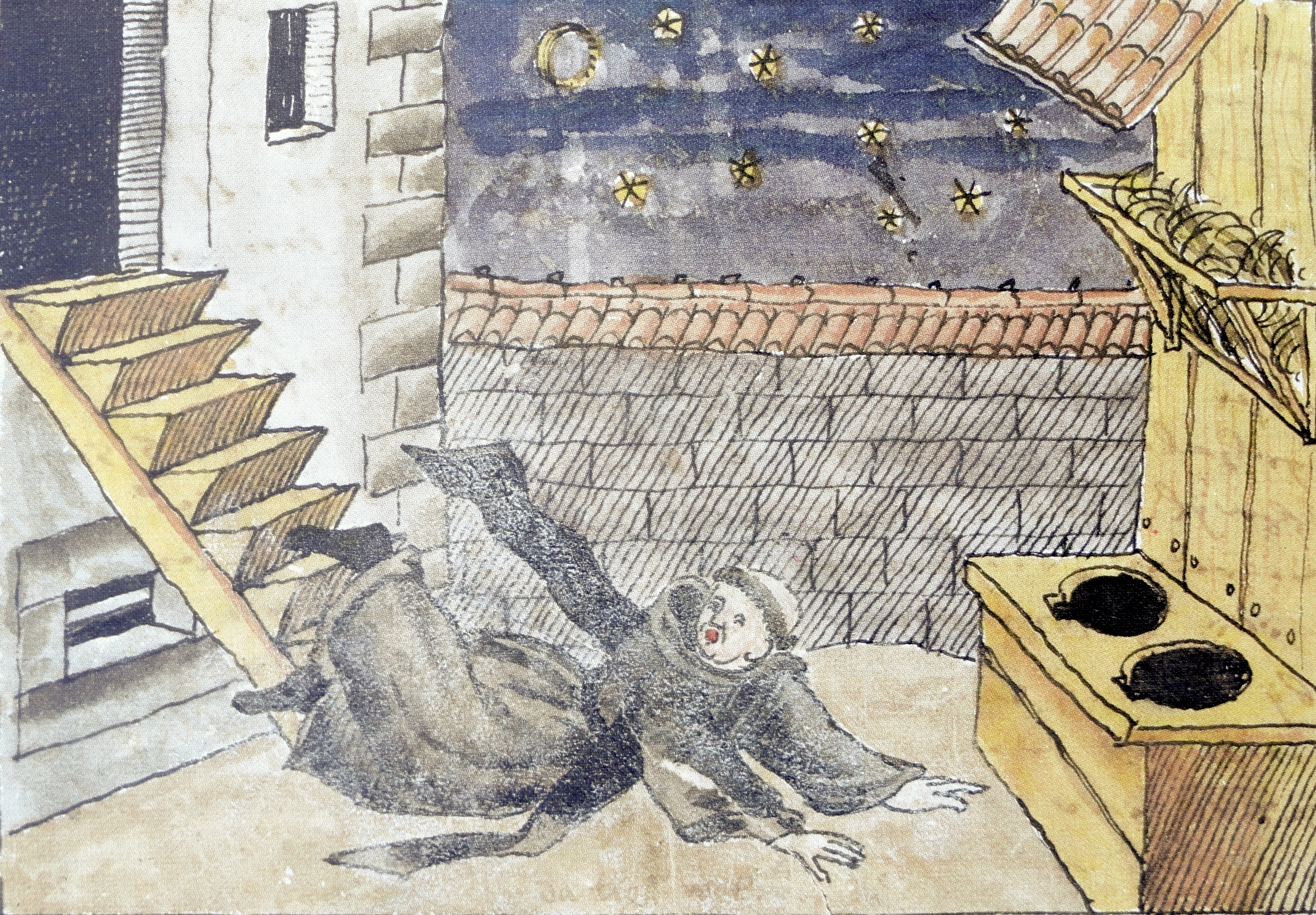
The monk Bastian Hegner, last surviving member of the convent of the Rüti Monastery, falls and dies in Rapperswil on November 10, 1561

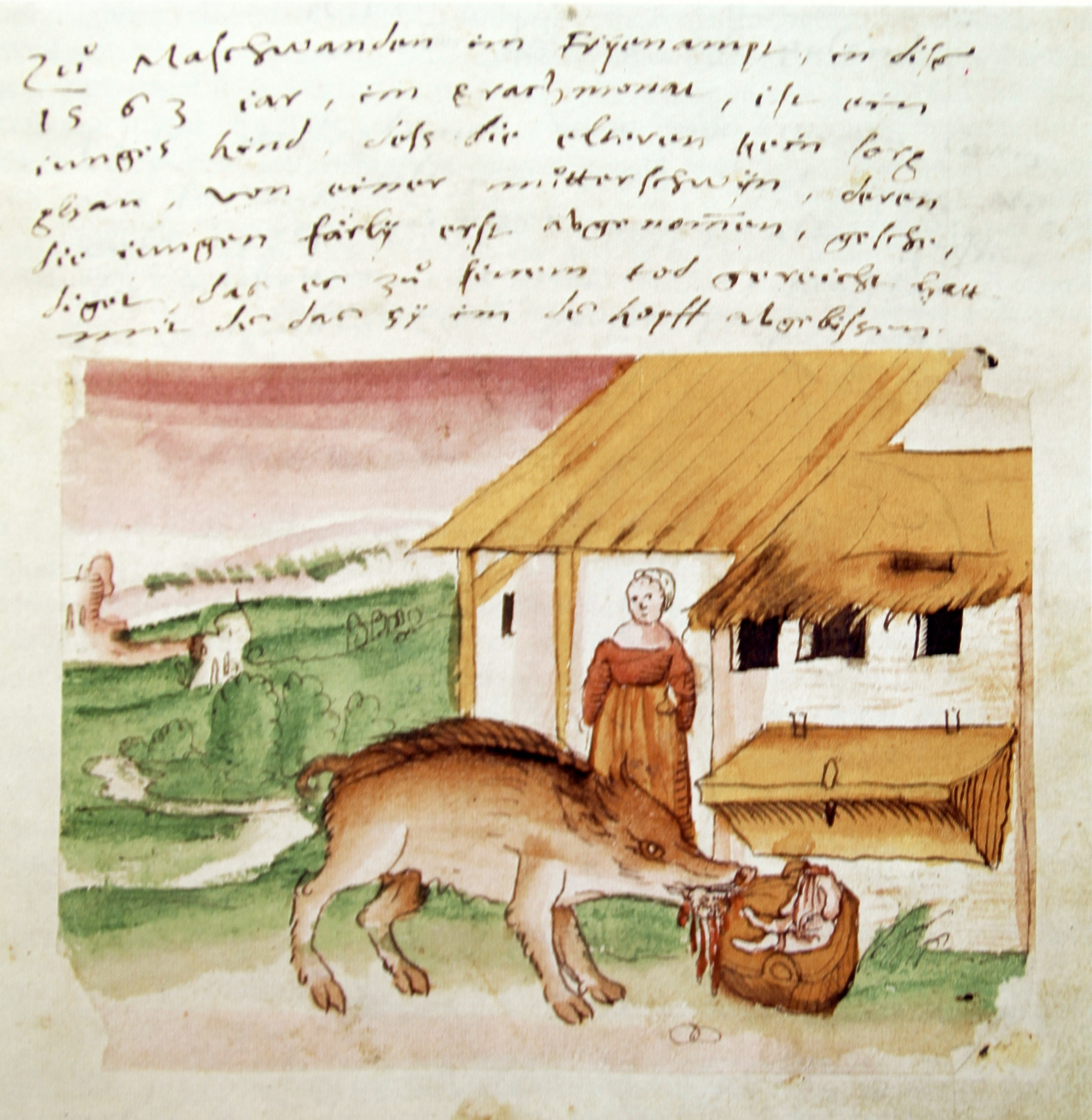
A child in Maschwanden is attacked by a pig and dies.

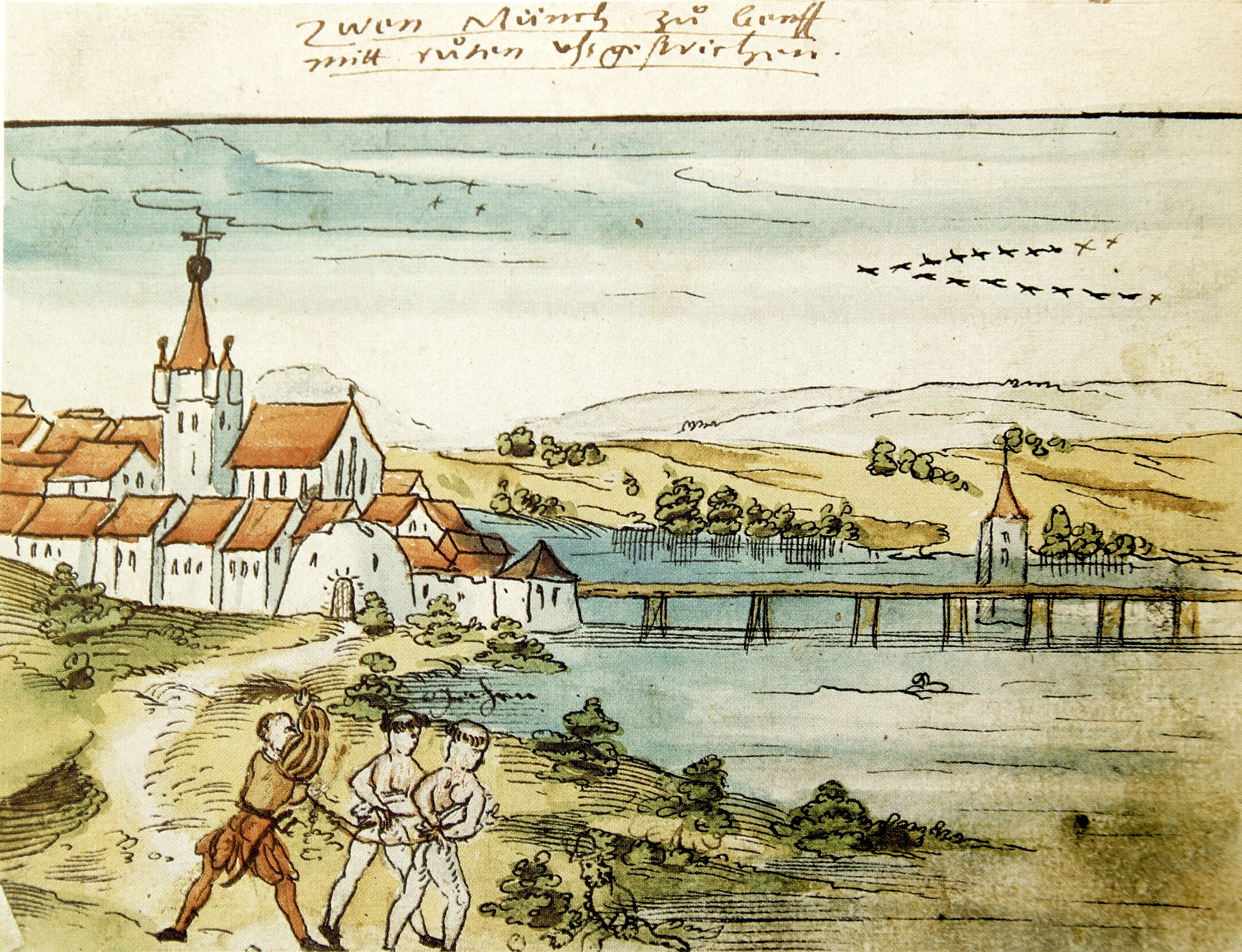
In Geneva two monks are flogged for cheating.

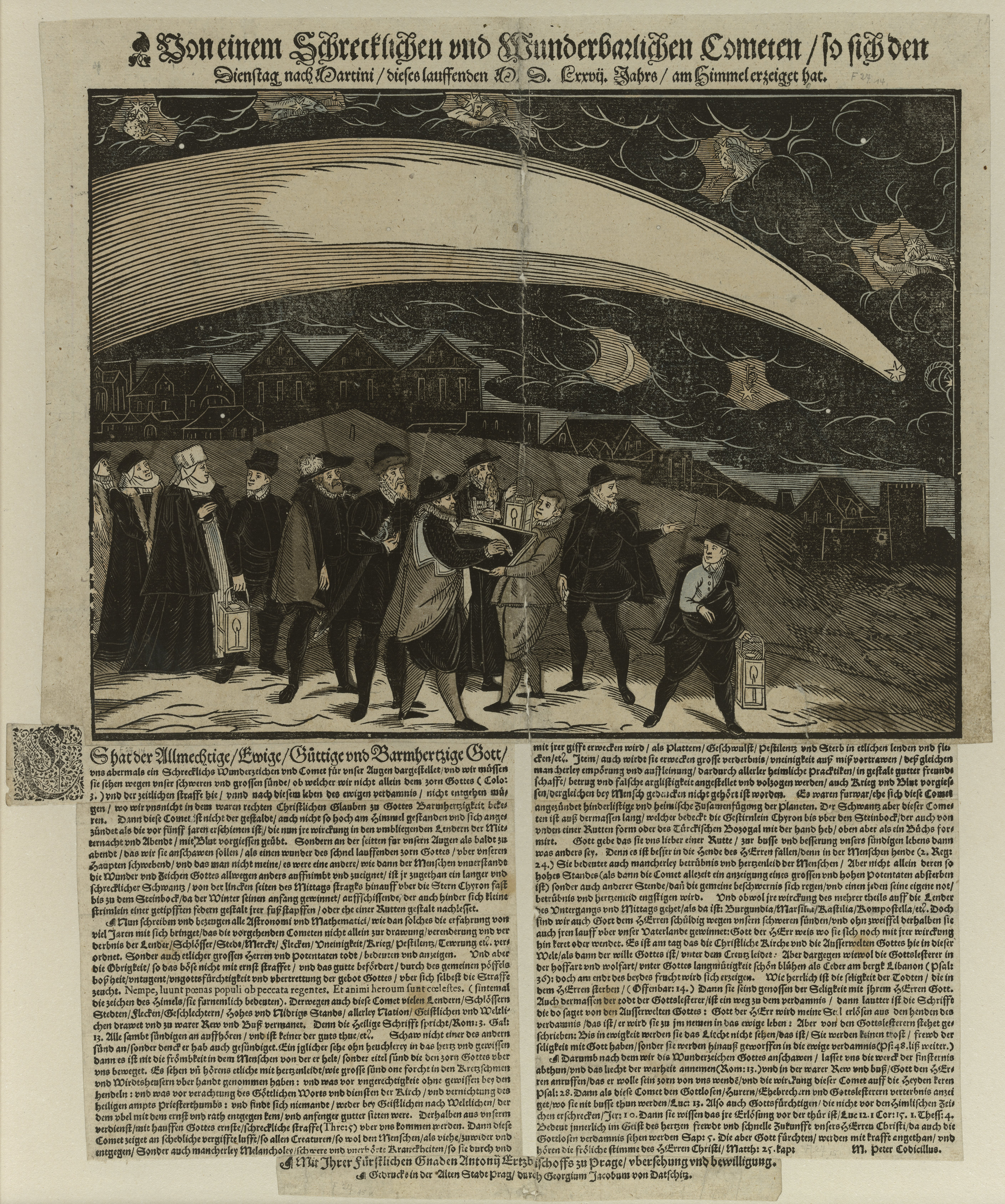
Great Comet of 1577, Prag, November 12, 1577
