= Horn family =

Swedish noble family

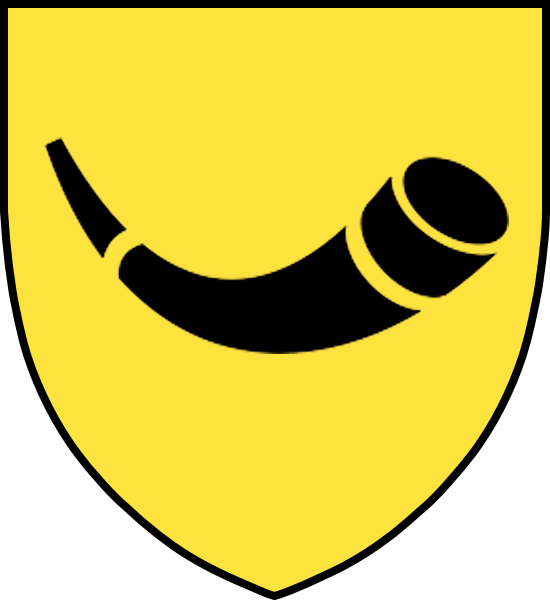
The Horn family coat of arms features a black drinking horn on yellow background

The Horn family (Swedish pronunciation: [ˈhuːɳ]) is a Swedish noble family from Finland, known since the 14th century.

== History ==
Its first known member, Olof Mattsson, is documented between 1381 and 1415, having a seat in Halikko parish. His seal featured the figure of a drinking horn. Like other Swedish noble families of medieval origin, the family name was not used as a surname before the 16th century.

Several descendants of Olof Mattsson have been ennobled under extended versions of the family name. Today, only one of these branches still exists, as recognized by the Swedish House of Nobility.

After the Finnish War, the Horn family remained in Sweden, and was not introduced in the new Finnish House of Nobility.

== Branches ==
=== Horn af Åminne ===
After Klas Horn, raised to baron (sw. friherre) under the name Horn af Åminne in 1561. In 1772 brothers Fredric and Gustaf Adolf Horn af Åminne were raised to counts under the same name. The name derives from the manor Åminne in Halikko, which was in the possession of the family from the 14th century to 1782.

Members of the Horn af Åminne branch include:

- Klas Horn af Åminne (1517–1566), admiral of the Swedish navy.
- Bengt Horn af Åminne (1623-1678), statesman and field marshal
- Clas Fredrik Horn af Åminne (1763–1823), part of the conspiracy to murder King Gustav III.
- Catharina Ebba Horn af Åminne (1720–1781)
- Henric Horn af Åminne (1880–1947), participant in the 1912 olympics.

=== Horn af Kanckas ===
Registered as a noble family in 1625. Named after the Kankas manor (fi. Kankainen) in Masku. The spelling reflects an older Swedish orthographical tradition. The male line went extinct in 1728.

The branches Horn af Björneborg, Horn af Marienborg and Horn af Ekebyholm all descend from the Horn af Kanckas branch.

Members of the Horn af Kanckas branch include:

- Henrik Klasson Horn af Kanckas (1512–95)
- Karl Henriksson Horn af Kanckas (1550–1601), Swedish field marshal.
- Evert Horn af Kanckas (1585–1615), Swedish field marshal.

==== Horn af Björneborg ====
After Gustaf Horn, raised to count under the name Horn af Björneborg in 1651. Named after the crown estate of Björneborg, present-day Pori. The male line went extinct in 1657.

Members of the Horn af Björneborg branch include:

- Gustaf Horn af Björneborg (1592-1657), Swedish field marshal.
- Agneta Horn af Björneborg (1629-1672), known for her autobiographical writings.

==== Horn af Marienborg ====
After Henrik Horn, raised to count under the name Horn af Marienborg in 1651. Named after Marienburg Castle (Latvian Alūksne) in Livonia. The male line went extinct in 1728.

- Henrik Horn af Marienborg (1618–93), Swedish field marshal.

==== Horn af Ekebyholm ====
After Arvid Horn, raised to baron under the name Horn af Ekebyholm in 1700, and later again to count in 1706. Named after Ekebyholm Castle in Uppland. The male line went extinct in 1798.

Members of the Horn af Ekebyholm branch include:

- Arvid Horn af Ekebyholm (1664-1742), Swedish President of the Privy Council Chancellery.

== Similar names ==
The Swedish noble families Horn af Rantzien and von Horn are not related to the Horn family, but are of Pomeranian and Dutch origin, respectively.

== See also ==
List of Swedish noble families
List of Swedish field marshals
