= Siege of Reval (1577) =

Siege of Reval in 1577

- Part of the Livonian War
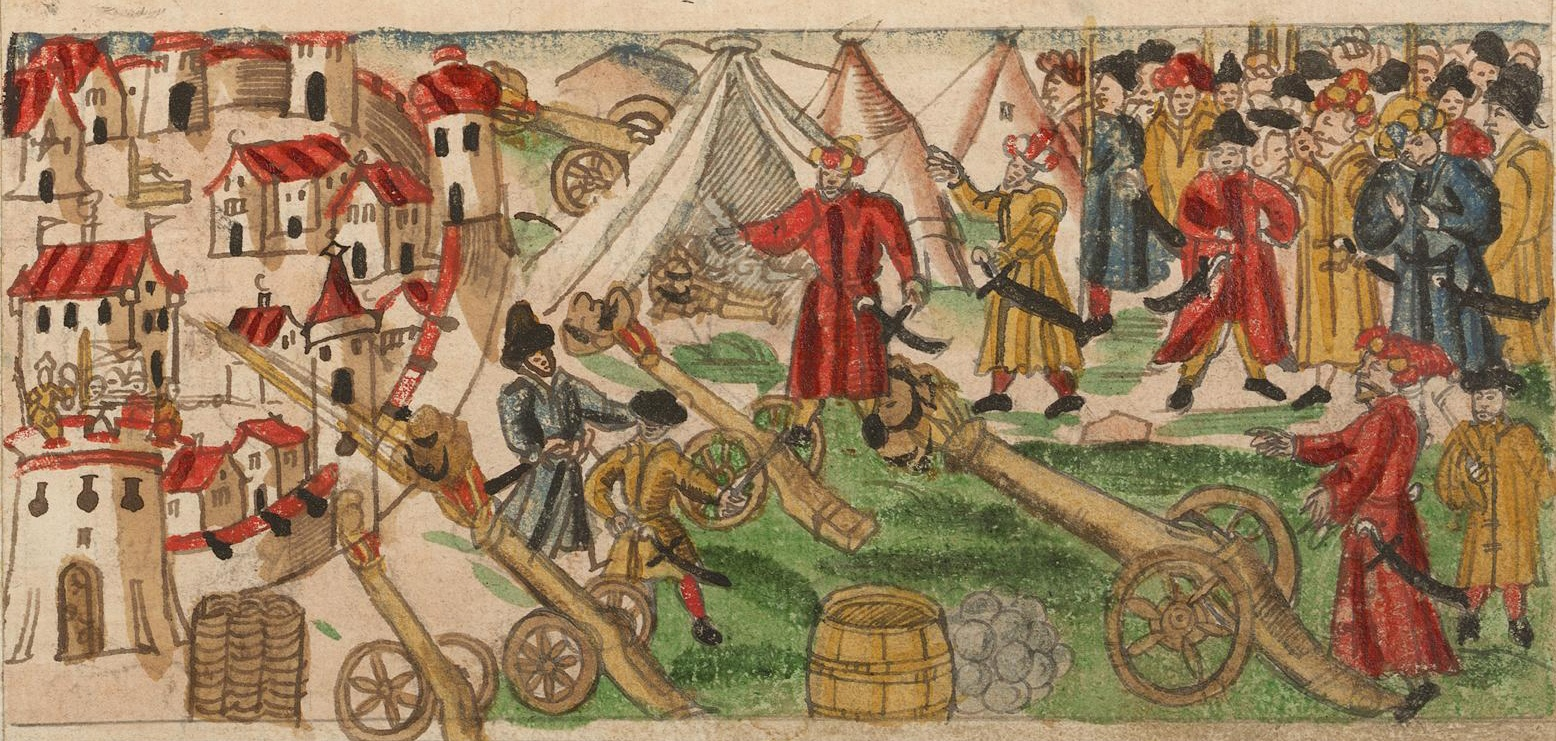
- Siege of Reval, by Johann Jakob Wick
Date	January 23 – March 13, 1577
Location	Reval (Modern day Tallinn), Estonia
Result	Swedish victory

Belligerents
Kingdom of Sweden	Tsardom of Russia

Commanders and leaders
Henrik Klasson Horn; Carl Henriksson Horn; Ivo Skenkenberg; Lars von Köllen †	(Tsardom of Russia) Ivan IV (Tsardom of Russia) Fjodor Mustislavski (Tsardom of Russia) Ivan Kolzoff † (Tsardom of Russia) Ivan Men'shoi Sheremetev †

Units involved
Reval Garrison	Unknown

Strength
Unknown amount of men 100 guns	28,000 to 50,000 men 28–200 guns

Casualties and losses
100 killed	3,000–4,000 casualties

The siege of Reval (1577) was a failed siege conducted by Tsar Ivan IV against the Swedish city of Reval during the Livonian War. Despite being able to occupy eastern Livonia, the Russian campaign eventually ended in failure due to the Russians failing to capture Reval.

== Background ==
Ivan the Terrible

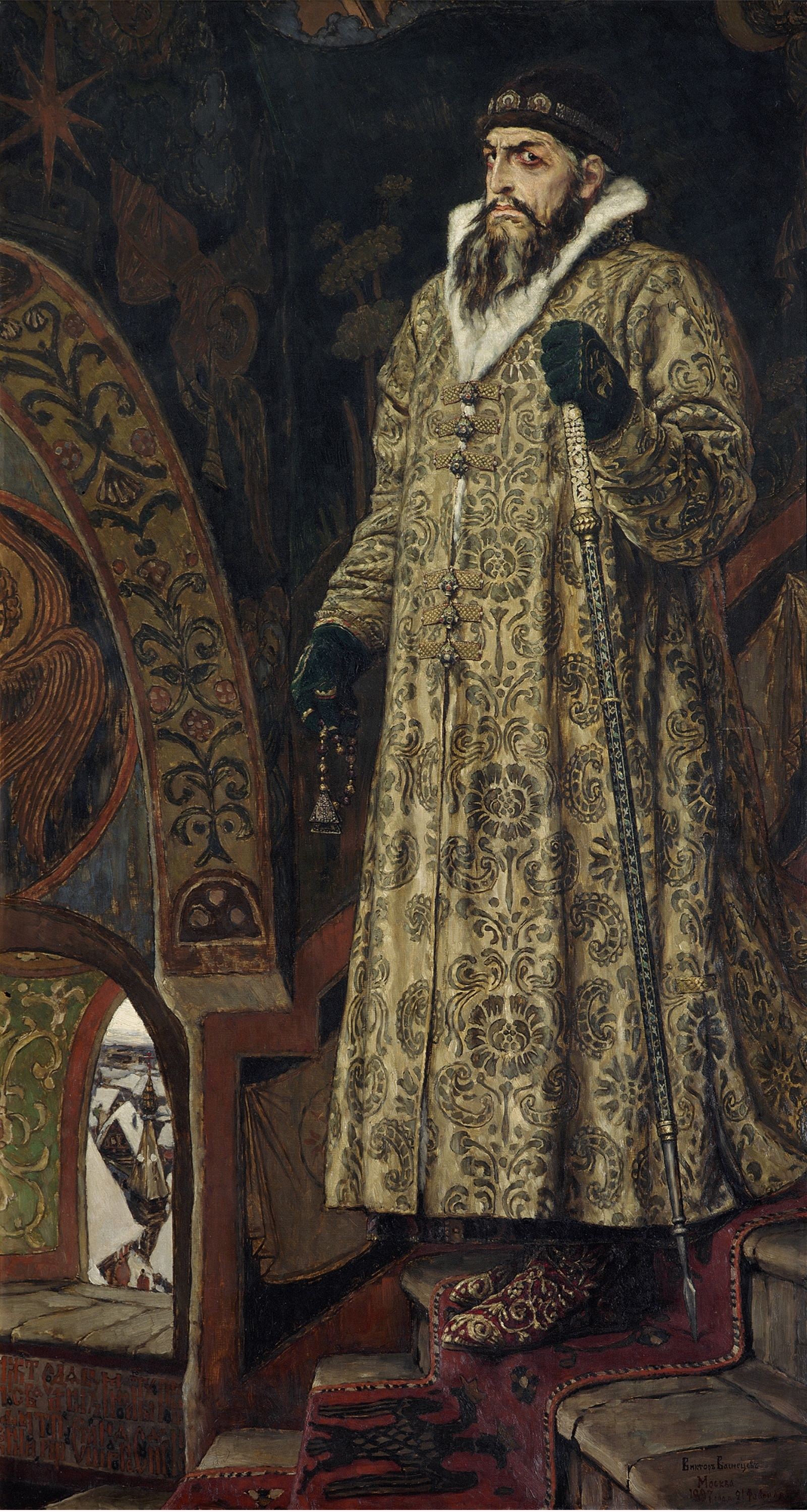
Portrait of Tsar Ivan IV by Viktor Vasnetsov

In early January of 1577, two men snuck away from Reval and secretly told the Russians about the terrible conditions in the city, they told the Russians that the people in Reval were very concerned that Sweden was going to emerge victorious in the ongoing war, after which the Russians decide to attack the city.

== Siege ==
On 23 January, a Russian army numbering around 50,000 came up to Reval led by, Ivan IV, Fjodor Mustislavski, Ivan Kolzoff, and Ivan Men’shoi Sheremetev. This army had less artillery, almost 5 times, 28 Russians guns and more than 100 Swedish guns. Other sources claim that the Russian army had some 200 guns, of which 50 were mortars. The Russians established a camp around the city, and began bombarding the city four days later.

However, the city's defenses had been well prepared for this, and the commanders, Henrik Klasson Horn along with his son had done their best to make the defenses as effective as possible. A man by the name of Ivo Skenkenberg was given command of a force of Estonian peasants.

The Swedish commanders managed to effectively lead the defense, with soldiers, burghers, and peasants inside the city being determined to defend it from the Russians. Initially for the defenders, the incendiary shells fired from the Russian positions pose the greatest danger to them, but this is effectively fixed by storing away any particularly flammable material, and introducing a reward for every "fireball" handed over to the commander. The Swedes also carried out many successful sorties against the besiegers, like one killing Ivan Kolzoff. Another one of the sorties was so successful that the leader, Ivo Skenkenberg, received the nickname "Reval's Hannibal" During one of the sorties, the överste Lars von Köllen was killed.

The artillery inside the fortress also inflicts heavy casualties on the Russians, with Ivan Men'shoi Sheremetev being killed by a cannonball from the fortress. On March 13, Ivan gave up and lifted the siege, with the Russians burning their camp and retreating the same day, with the Russians losses being estimated at 3,000–4,000. It is also possible that the Russian losses are heavily exaggerated. In comparison, the Swedes only lost some 100 men.

== Aftermath ==
After the Russians withdrew from Reval, the Swedes went on a counteroffensive, recapturing several smaller strongholds around Reval.

== Works cited ==
- Sundberg, Ulf (1998). Medeltidens svenska krig (in Swedish) (1st ed.). Stockholm: Hjalmarson & Högberg Bokförlag. ISBN 978-91-89080-26-3.
- Landgrén, Lars-Folke (2008). Tvekampen 1521-1611 [The Duel 1521-1611]. Krigen kring Östersjön (in Swedish). Helsinki: Schildts. ISBN 9789515018212.
