= Ekebyholm Castle =

Building in Norrtälje Municipality, Stockholm County, Sweden

- Norrtälje Municipality, Sweden
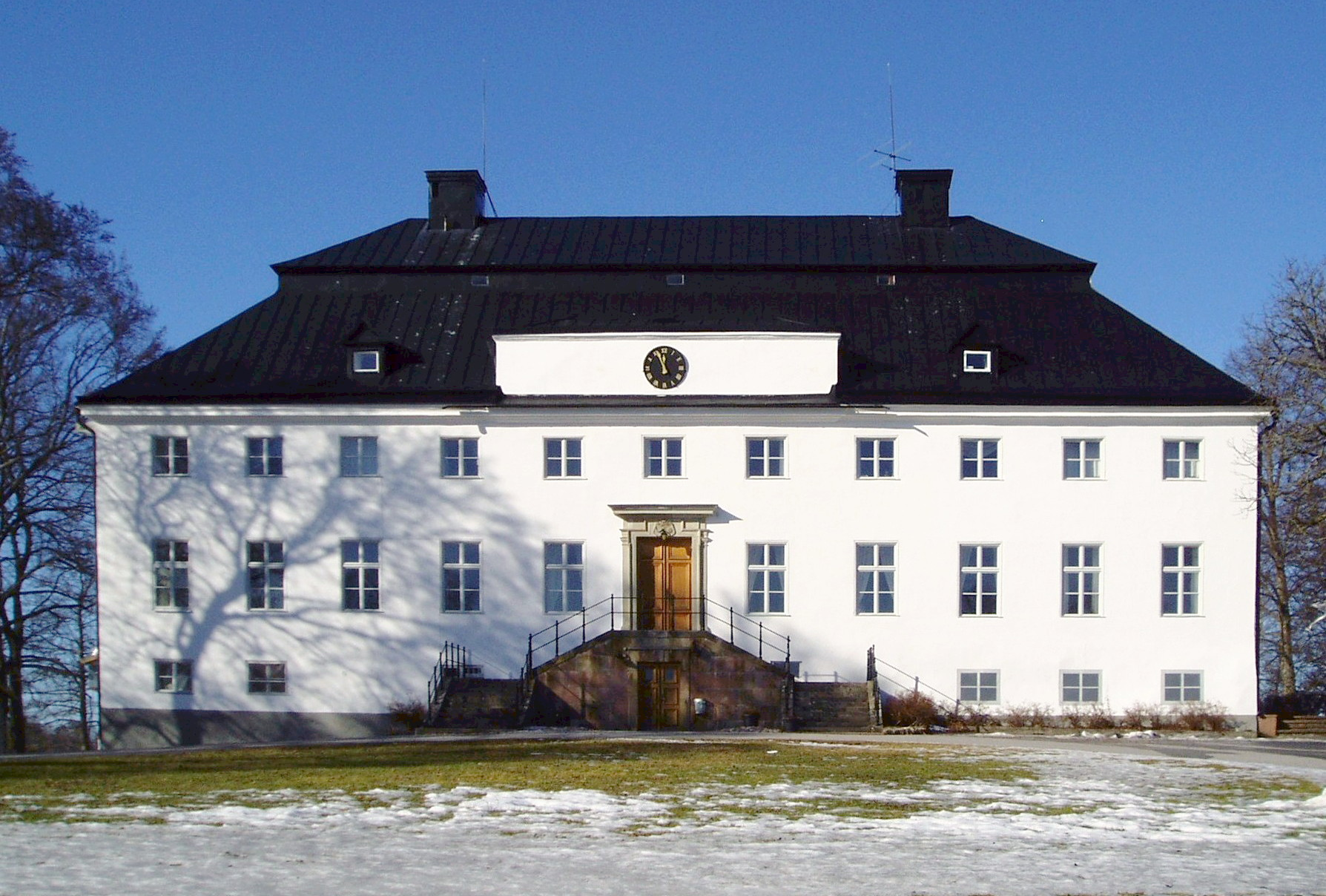
- Ekebyholms slott

Site information
- Type: Former Manor House

Location
- Coordinates: 59°46′05″N 18°21′08″E

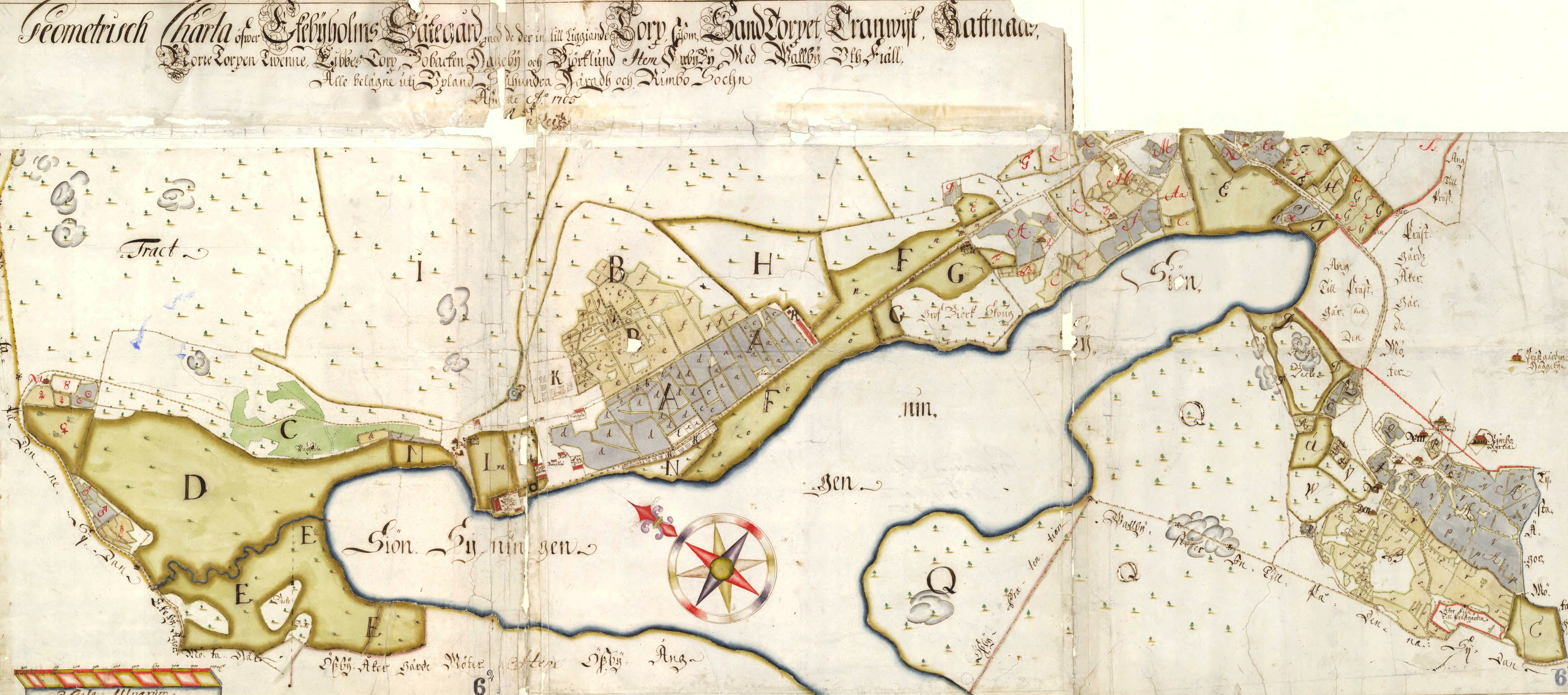
Map of Ekebyholm circe 1700

Ekebyholm is a castle-like mansion and a former manor located by Lake Syningen in Rimbo parish in Norrtälje Municipality in Stockholm county, Sweden. In 1932, the Adventist school purchased Ekebyholm. Presently Ekebyholmsskolan is located on site.

== History ==
Ekebyholm in Rimbo (currently a part of Norrtälje) was attached with the estate of Mörby, owned by the Pomeranian-originated family of Slaveka. Bengt Gabrielson (Oxenstierna) af Mörby (d. 1591) acquired the estates of Mörby and Ekebyholm which were separated with Mörby passing to his elder son Gabriel Bengtsson Oxenstierna (1586–1656) and Ekebyholm passing to the youngest, posthumous son Bengt Bengtson Oxenstierna (1591–1643) who first had the manor built at Ekebyholm.

=== List of owners ===
- Johannes Claussen Slaveka af Steninge and Mörby (d. 1485)
- Mereta Johansdotter Slaveka (d. 1532) and her husband Bengt Kristiernson (Oxenstierna) (d. 1495)
- Kristiern Bengtsson (Oxenstierna) (executed on 8 November 1520)
- Baron Gabriel Kristiernsson (Oxenstierna) (c. 1508–1585)
- Baron Bengt Gabrielson (Oxenstierna) af Mörby (c. 1550–1591)
- Baron Bengt Bengtson (Oxenstierna) (1591–1643) and his wife Margareta Brahe (1559–1638) had a manor built at Ekebyholm
- Baroness Sigrid Bengtsdotter (Oxenstierna) (1590–1644) and her husband, baron Claes Horn (1587–1651)
- Field Marshal, baron Bengt Claesson Horn (1623–1678)
- Brigadier, baron Christer Horn (c. 1655–1740) and his siblings
- Count Arvid Horn, Premier of Sweden (1664–1742), purchased the estate in 1724
- Count Adam Horn (1717–1778) and his siblings
- Katriina Ebba Horn (1720–1781) purchased Ekebyholm in 1746
- Count Gustaf Adolf Horn af Åminne (1721–1793)
- Count Gustaf Adolf Horn (1754–1816) and his brother count Klaus Gustafsson Horn (1755–1823)
- Baron Karl Gabriel (Oxenstierna) acquired Ekebyholm in 1828

== Gallery ==
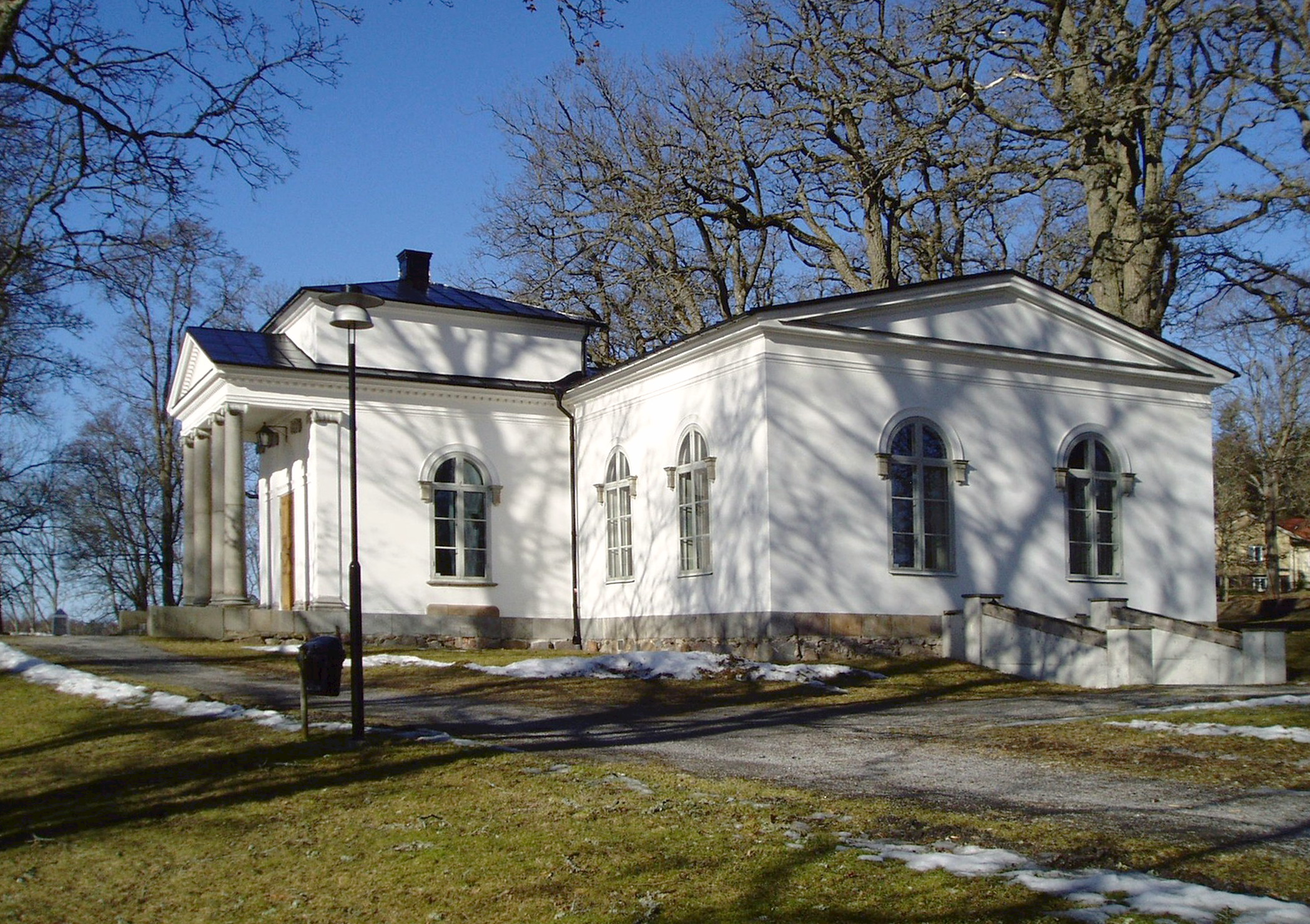
Library in the park.

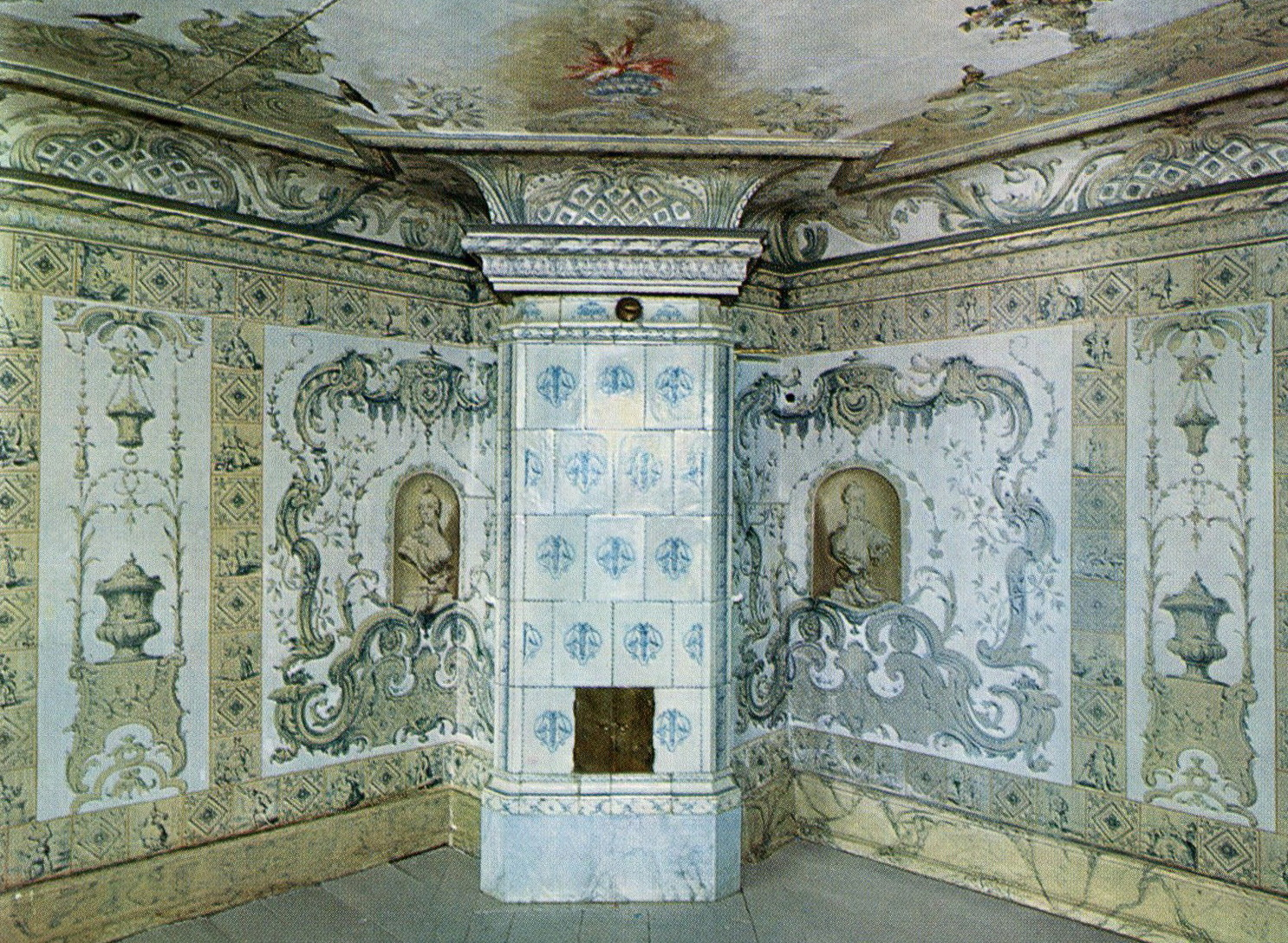
King's room.

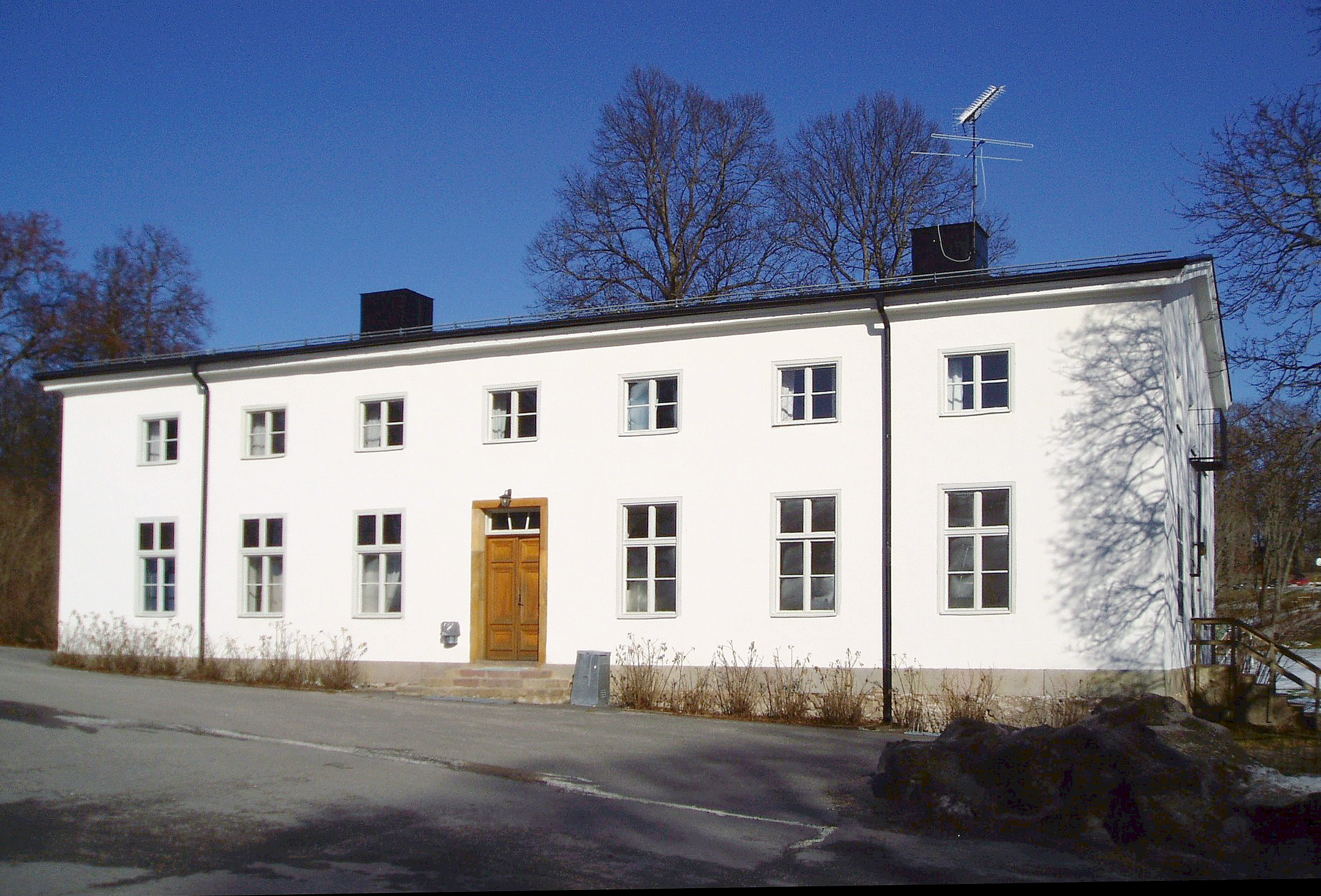
Northeast wing.

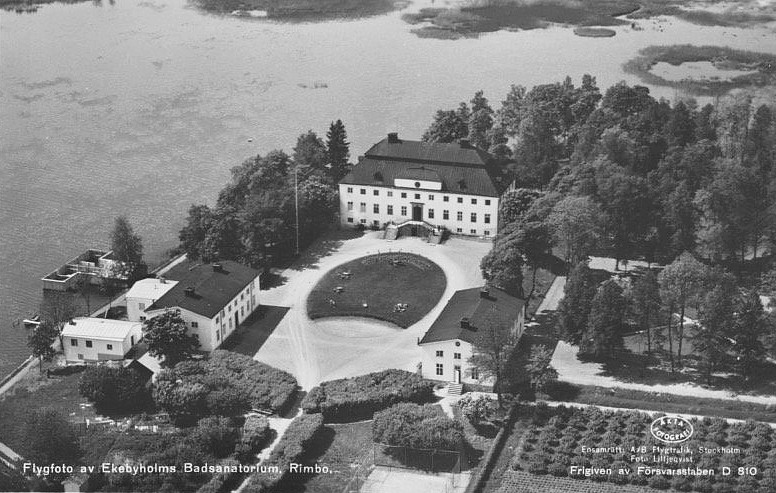
Ekebyholm Castle 1940s–1950s

== See also ==
- List of castles in Sweden
