= Johann Jakob Wick =

Protestant clergyman

Johann Jakob Wick (1522 – 14 August 1588) was a Protestant clergyman from Zürich.

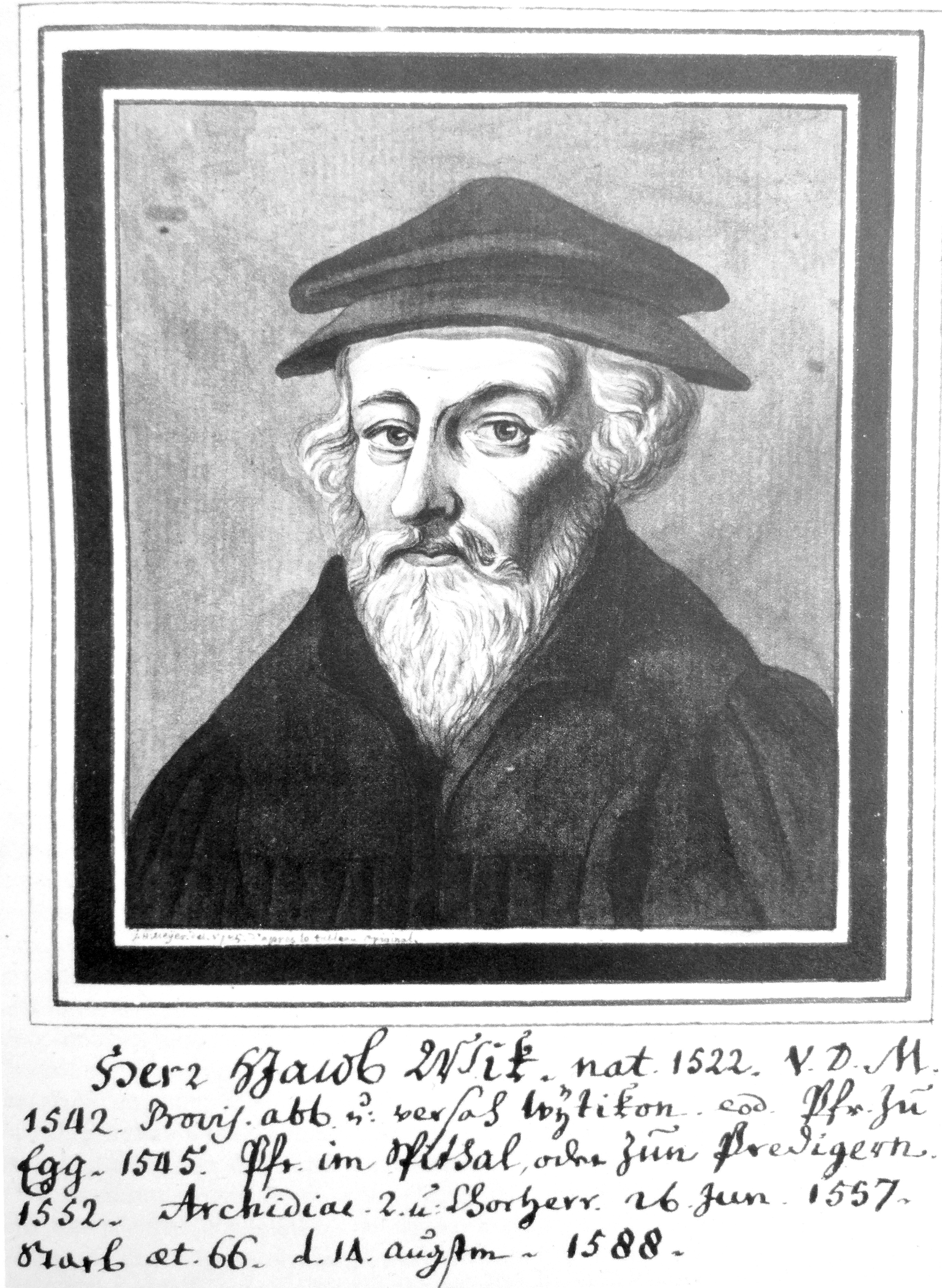
J. J. Wick

Wick lived in the Zürich of Heinrich Bullinger, the successor of Huldrych Zwingli. He studied theology in Tübingen, and was pastor of Witikon, at the city hospital, and the Predigerkirche. Afterwards he was canon and second archdeacon at the Grossmünster. Wick is the collector of the Wickiana.
