= Nils Gyldenstolpe (1642–1709) =

Swedish count, official and diplomat

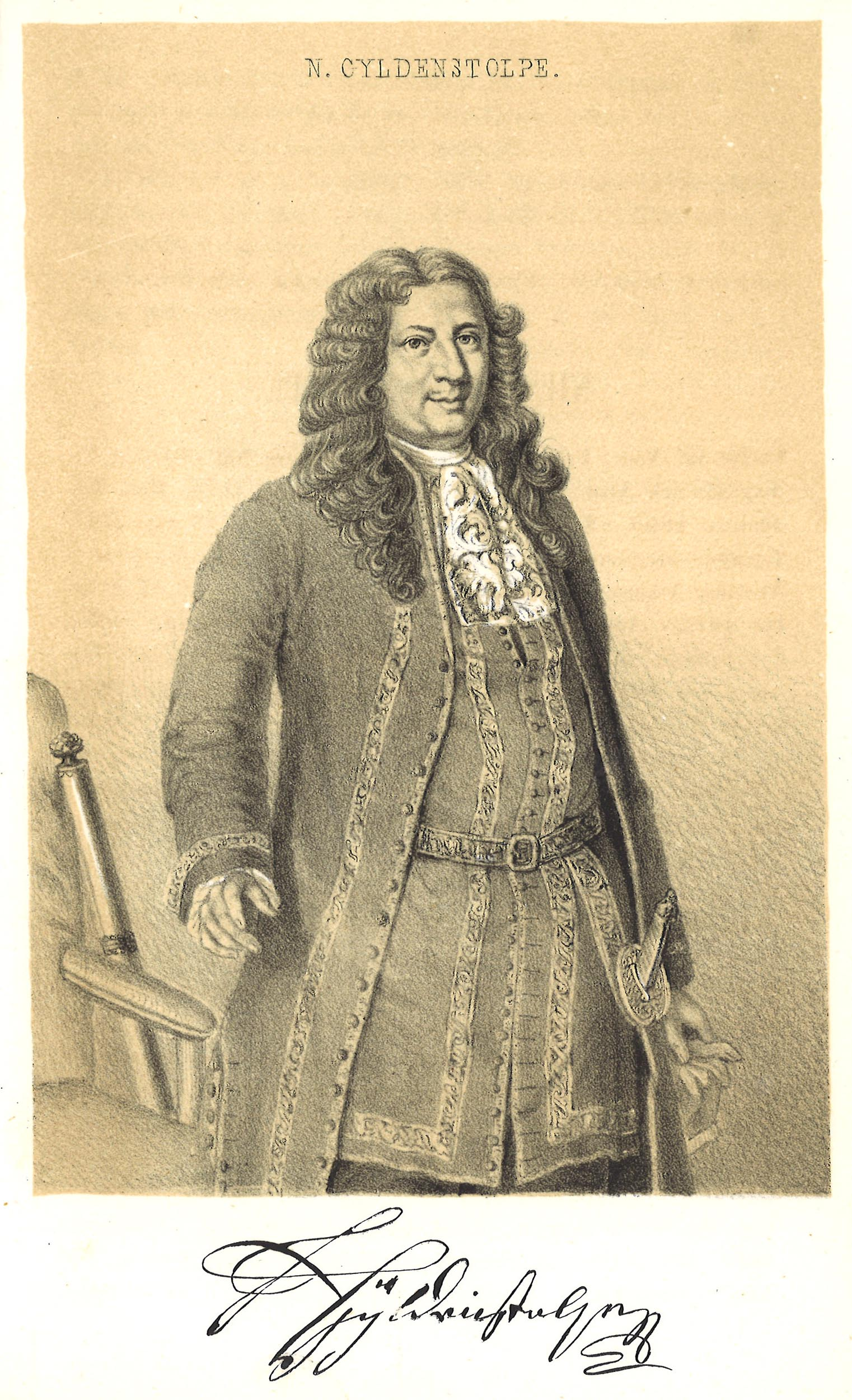
Nils Gyldenstolpe.

Nils Gyldenstolpe (5 November 1642 in Åbo (Turku) in present-day Finland – 4 May 1709) was a Swedish count, official and diplomat. He was one of king Karl XI's closest advisors and owed much of his career to Bengt Gabrielsson Oxenstierna. His father was Mikael Olai Wexionius Gyldenstolpe.
