= Kankainen Manor =

Manor house in Masku, Finland

Coordinates: 60°33′28″N 22°05′46″E

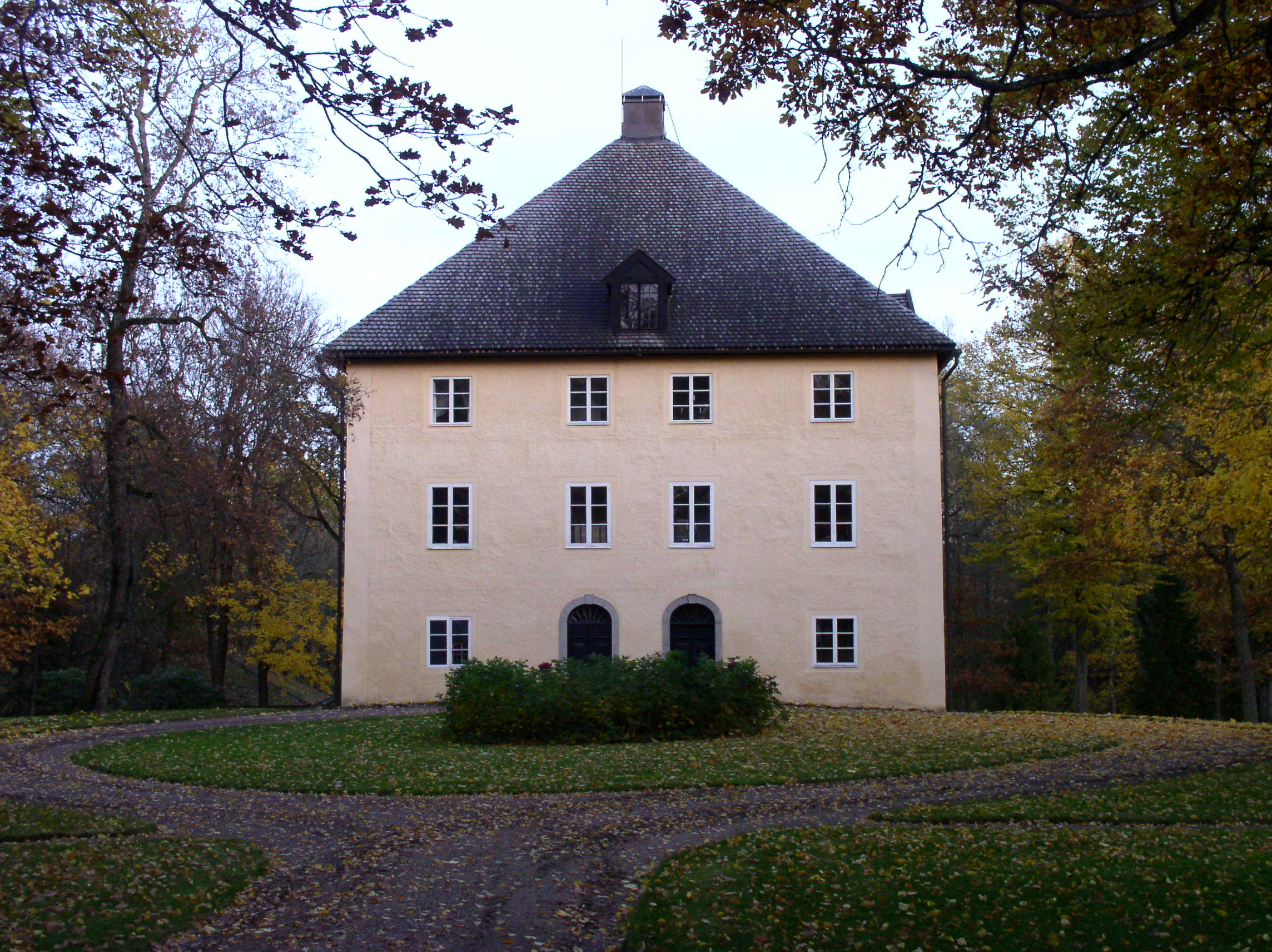
Kankainen Manor main building in autumn

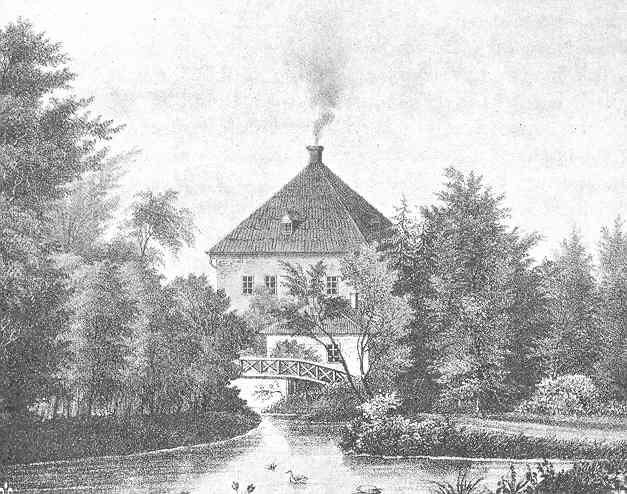
A 19th-century drawing of the manor house showing it in the building's 1762–1935 two-storey form from Finland framstäldt i teckningar edited by Zacharias Topelius and published 1845-1852.

Kankainen Manor (Finnish: Kankaisten kartano, Swedish: Kankas gård) is a late medieval manor in Masku, Finland, located along a small river about one kilometre south of Masku town centre. Kankainen Manor is considered to be the oldest surviving residential building in Finland, as its oldest parts may be from the end of the 15th century. In 2009, the Finnish Heritage Agency defined it as one of Finland's nationally significant built cultural environments.

== History ==
The first known historical record of the village of Kankainen is from 1346, and the manor estate is thought to have been founded in the 1410s by Klaus Lydekesson Diekn, then the bailiff of Turku Castle. The Horn family owned the estate for two and a half centuries from 1437 until 1695 and the manor house itself was built by Henrik Klasson Horn around 1550, although the basement and foundations of the building are older and likely date from the late 15th century. During the Horns' ownership, the manor was visited by king Gustav I in 1556 and king Gustavus Adolphus in 1616.

During the 17th century reductions, a large portion of the manor's land was returned to the Crown, and in 1695, Evert Horn the Younger handed the estate over to major general Johan Ribbing to settle a debt. The manor house was damaged during the Greater Wrath and by the 1750s, its condition had deteriorated so much that trees and vines were reported to be growing inside the walls. Nils Hasselbom, a professor at the Royal Academy of Turku, purchased the manor in 1756 and had the building renovated in 1762–1763 according to plans made by Augustin Ehrensvärd. During these renovations, the ruined original third floor was removed and the building's windows were realigned for symmetry. A false second door was also added for symmetry with the off-centre main entrance.

The manor was auctioned to colonel Berndt Aminoff in 1846. Upon his death, the manor passed onto his son Carl Fredrik Aminoff, who died childless during the Finnish Civil War in 1918 and bequeathed the manor to relative Claes Aminoff, who had the building renovated and the third floor rebuilt in 1935, restoring the original cubic form of the building.

In 1992, Claes Aminoff's son Fredrik Aminoff had to sell the estate to the Åbo Akademi University Endowment due to financial problems. The foundation maintained the manor house as a museum available by appointment, and the estate's 19th century cowhouse was refurbished as a rentable space for functions and events. The Finnish National Board of Antiquities listed the manor building and grounds as a built cultural heritage site of national significance in 2009.

The manor was sold to a private company Tractatus Properties Oy in 2018 to be used as an arts and sciences centre.
