= Battle of Ubagall =

Battle between Russians and Swedes

Date	16 March 1571
Location	Ubagall, Weissenstein
Result	Swedish victory

Belligerents
(Swedish Empire) Sweden	(Russian Empire) Russia

Commanders and leaders
(Swedish Empire) Karl Henriksson Horn	(Russian Empire) "Tiesenhusen" †

Strength
300 knights	Unknown

Casualties and losses
Unknown	Entire force killed

The Battle of Ubagall (Estonian: Ubakalu lahing) was a battle between soldiers of Carl Henriksson Horn and a Russian force under the command of Tiesenhusen in the village of Ubagall in 1571.

== Background ==
In the autumn of 1570, the Russian 'lydkonung' Magnus advanced towards Reval (modern day Tallinn.) with an army of 25,000. The Swedish defense was led by Gabriel Oxenstierna and Carl Henriksson Horn, who is described as a brave and courageous. Magnus had brought with him a large amount of cannons, which were his foremost weapon. Unfortunately for the Russians, their forces were not suitable for storming fortresses.

At the same time, a certain Livonian man by the name of Tiesenhusen marched towards the fortress of Weissenstein. He had previously made himself known for being particularly brutal, with there being rumours that he had drowned his sister for her wanting to marry with a writer.

The assaults against Reval by the Russians were not successful, since the Russian troops were not trained in sieges, and Sweden was able to supply the city from the sea. Since the Russians lacked a fleet, they had hoped that Denmark would assist them in the siege by blockading it, however, this does not occur, since Denmark signed a peace treaty with Sweden in the year. During January, the Russians plundered over the entirety of Estonia, but the siege of Reval did not improve. In late February a letter was thrown into the city, it tells them of the peace treaty signed with Denmark. In celebration of this outcome the defenders made a successful sortie against the Russians.

== Battle ==
On 16 March Magnus burned his camp outside of Reval and began to retreat, the entire affair costed Magnus 6,000 men. On the same day, Tiesenhusen lifted his siege of Weissenstein. When it was clear to the Swedes that the siege was lifted, Clas Henriksson Horn made an attack, he killed many roaming Russian troops. Tiesenhusen was also caught off guard by 300 Swedish knights at Ubagall, where his entire force was killed and the majority of his supplies were taken by the Swedes.

== Aftermath ==
In late 1571 Russia is attacked by the Tatars, who manage to burn Moscow. This results a period of peace in the Baltic.
