= Siege of Reval (1570–1571) =

Siege of Reval in 1570

- Part of the Livonian War
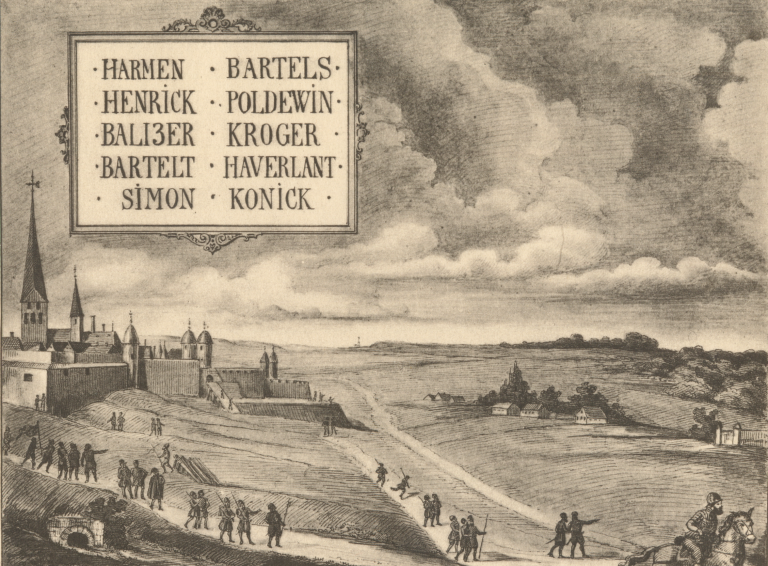
- Depiction of Reval as it was in 1561 in the Baltic Cultural-Historical Atlas of 1886
Date	21 August 1570 – 16 March 1571
Location	Reval (modern-day Tallinn), Duchy of Estonia
Result	Swedish victory

Belligerents
Kingdom of Sweden	Tsardom of Russia; Kingdom of Livonia

Commanders and leaders
Carl Henriksson Horn; Clas Åkesson Tott	(Tsardom of Russia) Duke Magnus of Holstein (Tsardom of Russia) Ivan Yakovlev-Zakhar’i (Tsardom of Russia) Vasilii Umnoi-Koly-chev (Tsardom of Russia) Yurii Tokmakov

Units involved
Reval Garrison	(Tsardom of Russia) Russian Army

Strength
650–785 men	1,000–25,000 men

Casualties and losses
Unknown	6,000–9,000 casualties (Swedish claims)

The siege of Reval (Swedish: Belägringen av Reval, Russian: Осада Ревеля) was a failed Russian siege of Reval (modern-day Tallinn) led by Duke Magnus of Holstein during the Livonian War.

== Background ==
=== Russian ceasefire with the Commonwealth ===
Ivan the Terrible

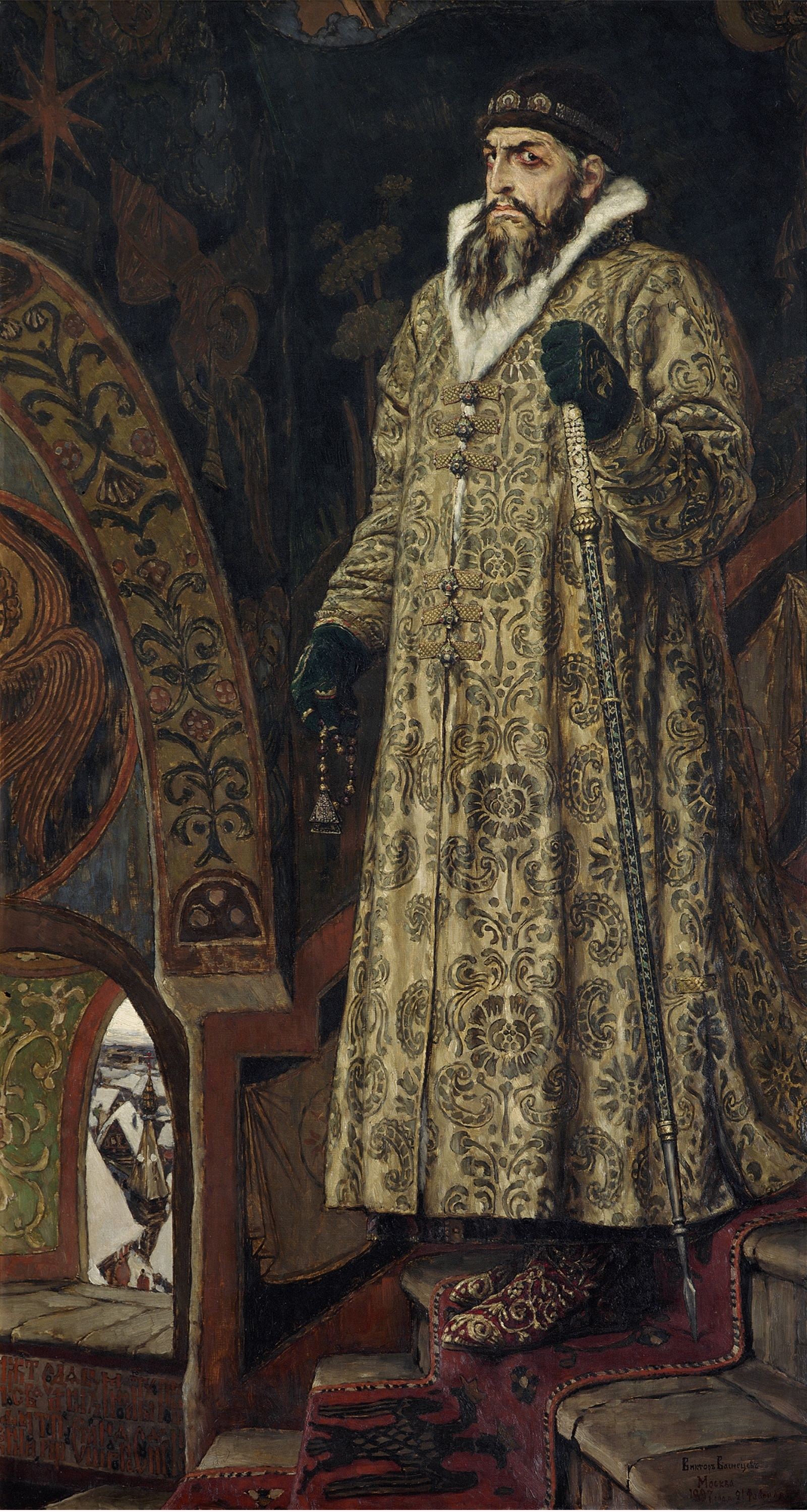
Portrait of Tsar Ivan IV by Viktor Vasnetsov

In 1570, after Russia had signed a ceasefire with the Commonwealth on its western border in Livonia that lasted 3 years, it freed up Russian troops for a war against Sweden, despite the peace settlement being flimsy and short-lived.

=== Beginning of the war ===
On 25 June, the Boyar Duma ratified the decision to send Russian troops towards Reval, which was tantamount to declaring war against Sweden. The likely reason for this being that the fall of Reval would have been the end of Swedish control over Estonia. The ongoing Northern Seven Years' War also encouraged the Russians to declare war on Sweden, as they hoped the Danish navy would support them in conquering Reval.

Duke Magnus of Livonia had also sworn to the Tsar that Danish support would come to his aid, but this proved to be a blunder. Magnus also used the planned siege to prove his worth to the Tsar, which he was assured would be an easy task.

== Siege ==
Magnus, Duke of Holstein

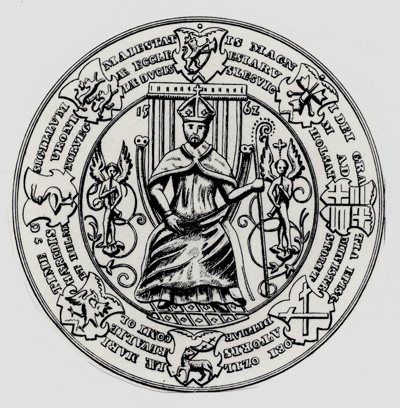
Seal of Duke Magnus as bishop of Saare-Lääne

=== 1570 ===
On August 21, Magnus approached Reval and began the siege of the city. The number of his troops, according to the chronicle of Balthasar Russow, was 25,000, which is accepted by some researchers as the real number of his troops, with an adjustment to 20,000. Some researchers consider these figures to be clearly overestimated, referring to the fact that only a few Voivode's went on a campaign at the local level. Russian sources also do not mention a significant concentration of forces or preparations for the campaign, as was the case with the siege of Polotsk. The numbers range from 1,000 to 4,500. It was wholly inadequate for a siege, however, Magnus believed that he could persuade the defenders to surrender. The Swedes only had around 650–785 knights. During the first months of his siege, Magnus sent countless letters to the commanders, being Clas Åkesson Tott and Carl Henriksson Horn. In early September, the Russians brought light artillery to the Russian camp from Narva, but these did not manage to cause any damage to the city.

On 16 October, the two voevody, Ivan Yakovlev-Zakhar’in, and Vasilii Umnoi-Koly-chev, appeared outside of Reval with Ivan having Zemshchina units with him and Vasilii with Oprichniki. Their total strength was around 4-5,000 men. They demanded that the defenders capitulate, threatening severe punishment to those who resisted. They demanded that the city surrender to the Tsar's "vassal" and promised to open all parts of Russia to the merchants inside to trade freely. Their demands were rejected, and instead of attacking the city, they plundered and burned the villages outside of the city walls. After this, Magnus realized that the actions of the Oprichnina would make him lose support among Livonian nobles, and his attempt to reason with his allies turned into a strong clash with the voevody. In the ensuing argument, the Tsar supported Magnus, and Ivan and Vasilii were quickly arrested and sent back to Moscow in irons.

The detaining of Ivan and Vasilii caused the immediate and complete suspension of the Russian siege works, during this period, Magnus informed the defenders that he "had no intention of lifting the siege and was only waiting for the arrival of Prince Yurii [Tokmakov] with a huge force and artillery."

=== 1571 ===
On 2 January, Tokmakovs forced arrived outside of Reval, the freezing weather had made constructing siege works more difficult for the besiegers. The Voevody was not able to get the cannons close enough to the city walls and a month and a half of bombarding them did not yield desirable results. In early February, a letter is thrown into the city, it told the defenders that peace with Denmark had been signed. In celebration of this news, the defenders do a successful sortie against the besiegers. After a plague had spread to the Russian camp, and in order to escape from it, the voevody decided to lift the siege, and on 16 March Tokmakov withdrew back to Pskov, with Magnus also burning his camp and retreating. In total, the siege resulted in 6,000-9,000 casualties for the Russians per Swedish and Livonian sources. Some sources believe this number is exaggerated.

=== Battle of Ubagall ===
When the defenders saw that the Russians have retreated fully, Carl Henriksson Horn decided to commit to a counterattack with 300 knights. In the village of Ubagall, close to Weissenstein, Carl surprised the Russian force under the command of a certain Tiesenhusen. As a result, the entire Russian force was killed, and most of the Russian supplies were taken.

== Aftermath ==
Later in the year, Russia was attacked by the tatars in the south, who managed to raze Moscow in May, which establishes a period of relative peace in the Baltic.

== Works cited ==
- Sundberg, Ulf (1998). Svenska krig 1521-1814 [Swedish wars 1521-1814] (in Swedish) (2nd ed.). Stockholm: Hjalmarson & Högberg. ISBN 9789189080140.
- Sundberg, Ulf (2010). Sveriges krig 1448-1630 [Sweden's wars 1630-1814] (in Swedish). Svenskt militärhistoriskt bibliotek. ISBN 9789185789634.
- Skrynnikov, Ruslan Grigorievich (2015). Reign of Terror: Ivan IV. Brill. ISBN 9789004304017.
- Isacson, Claes-Göran (2006). Vägen till stormakt : Vasaättens krig [The road to great power: The wars of the Vasa dynasty] (in Swedish). Norstedts. ISBN 9789113015026.
- Babulin, Igor B. (2016). Осада Ревеля в 1570-1571 гг. по данным хроники Бальтазара Рюссова [The siege of Reval in 1570-1571 according to the chronicle of Balthasar Russow] (PDF). Milhist Info (in Russian). 7. ISSN 2308-4286.
