= Henrik Klasson Horn =

Swedish military officer

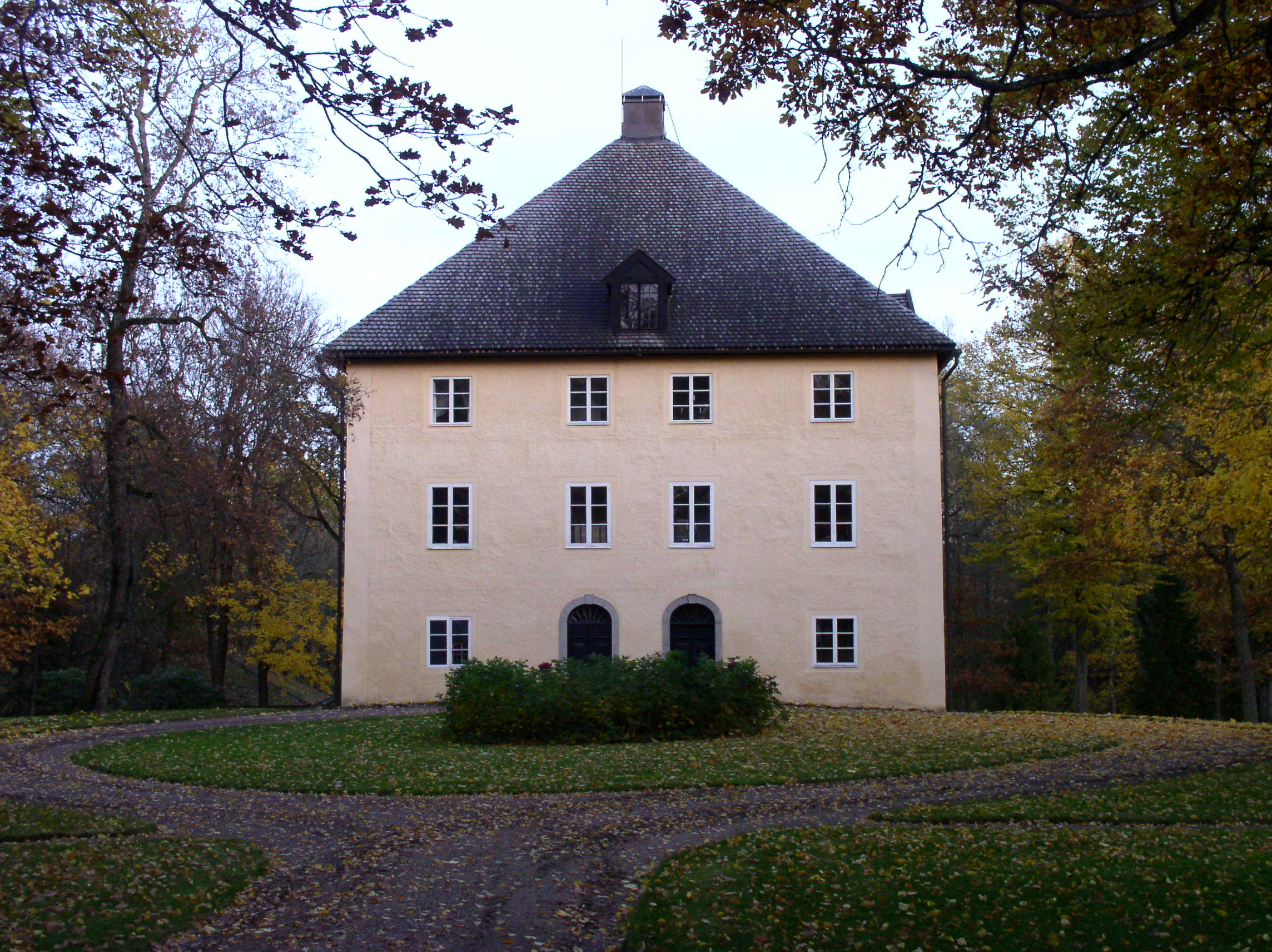
Kankas Manor in Masku, Finland

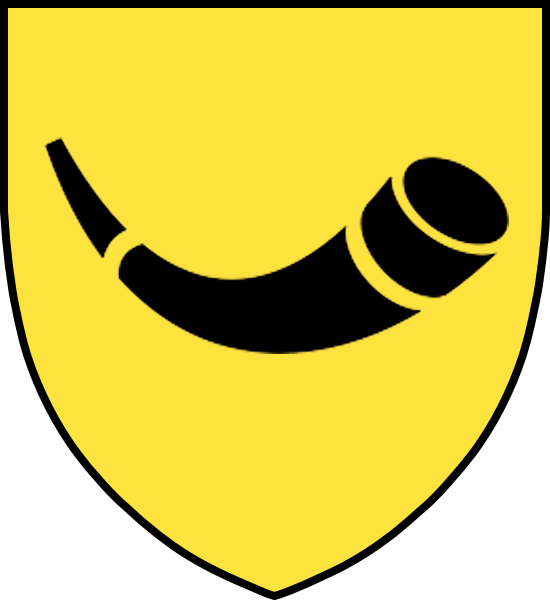
Modern rendering of Horn family crest

Henrik Klasson Horn (c. 1512 – c. 1595), was a Swedish military officer and Governor-General of Finland. He was an ancestor of the noble Swedish family, Horn af Kanckas.

== Biography ==
He was the son of Klas Henriksson Horn (c. 1445 – c. 1520) and his second wife, Kristina Jakobsdotter (c. 1495 – c. 1553). His father was a member of the Privy Council of Sweden and the commander of the Viborg Castle, where his parents likely married in 1511. His elder half-brother, Krister Klasson, served as bailiff of Turku Castle.

He was not yet ten years old when his father died, likely in the summer of 1520. He seems to have received an excellent education for his time. By 1531, he was active in high society, attending a noble wedding, and by 1534, he had entered the royal court. The following year, he was dispatched to Erik Fleming in Skåne with instructions for negotiations with King Christian III of Denmark.

In 1539, he was appointed as a chamberlain alongside Per Brahe and Ture Pedersson (Bielke) in the newly established royal chamber (Kammarkollegiet). Later, he was sent to Finland to oversee tax reforms, ensuring royal revenues were increased by implementing land registers (jordeböcker), depriving many impoverished nobles of their privileges. By 1542, he had returned to Sweden and continued to work in the royal chamber until he was sent on a diplomatic mission to northern Germany later that year.

In 1544, he married and likely took up residence at Kankas Manor in Masku, Finland. In 1546, he was appointed commander of the infantry. After the death of Erik Fleming in 1548, he became one of King Gustav Vasa’s most trusted men in Finland, handling both military and civil matters. In 1549, he was appointed chief judge (lagman) of southern Finland.

In 1555, he participated in the campaign against Shlisselburg (Nöteborg) under the command of Jakob Bagge. Although the fortress withstood the attacks and he initially faced the King Gustav's displeasure, he was soon entrusted with leading the ceasefire negotiations with the Russians in October 1555.

Henrik was knighted by King Erik XIV during his coronation in 1561, after which he was appointed commander-in-chief of the Swedish forces on the Livonian front. Between 1558 and 1563, Henrik was one of Duke John’s closest advisors and represented his interests in Finland.

He then served under King Erik XIV and was made a colonel during the Livonian War in October 1563 and Governor of Estonia and highest commander of the Swedish Infantry in the Baltic Dominions of Sweden. He defeated a German mercenary force near Tallinn in 1565. He was named to the position of High Councillor in 1566. In 1565 he became governor of Reval and over Livonia. He lost command in 1567 after the failure of the Swedish siege of Narva in 1579 and was replaced by Pontus de la Gardie (c. 1520 – 1585).

King John III appointed him as Governor-General of Finland and he served as such from 1572 until around 1580. This command included being commander-in-chief of all troops in Finland. He was one of the leaders of the attempted conquest of Northwestern Russia, in 1578-1580, but successes were only sporadic in the midst of all sorts of failures.

In the 1580s, he was active in defence tasks: castellan of Käkisalmi fortress and governor of Eastern Finland. In the 1580s, he settled at Taipale Manor which he had built in Masku, and left Kankainen Manor to his eldest son, Field Marshal Karl Henriksson Horn af Kanckas (1550–1601). He died on 21 June 1595 at the age of 83 at Kankas Manor in Masku in southwestern Finland.

== Marriage and children ==
In the mid-1540s (presumably around 1544), he married Elin Arvidsdotter (died 1577). She was a daughter of Arvid Stålarm the Elder (died 1529), justiciar of Karelia and castellan of Häme Castle, and his wife Christina Knutsdotter (Kurck).

From his marriage, he had at least ten children, including three sons, Karl, Arvid, and Jöran, and daughters Kerstin, Karin, Brita, Elin, Elisabet, and Anna. He and his wife became the ancestors of the noble Swedish family, Horn af Kanckas.

== See also ==
- Horn family

== Other sources ==
- Blomstedt, Kaarlo (1921) Henrik Klaunpoika Horn – Ajankuvaus, I. Kustaa Vaasan ja Juhana herttuan palveluksessa. 1921. 544 pages.
- Elgenstierna, Gustaf: ättartavlor ... introducerade adeln, vol III
