= Magdalena Elisabeth Söderhielm =

Swedish noblewoman and ironmaster

Magdalena Elisabeth Söderheilm
- Other names: Lona Lisa
- Born: 22 October 1718; Norn, Dalarna, Sweden
- Died: 24 June 1787 (aged 68); Ramnäs, Västmanland, Sweden
- Noble family: Tersmeden (by marriage); Söderhielm (by birth)
- Spouse: Jacob Tersmeden the Younger (m. 1743; died 1787)
- Issue: 12
- Father: Lorentz Niclas Söderhielm
- Mother: Alletha Maria Cederberg
- Occupation: Ironmaster

Magdalena Elisabeth Söderhielm (22 October 1718 – 24 June 1787) was a Swedish ironmaster.

== Early life ==
Magdalena Elisabeth Söderhielm was born on 22 October 1718 in Dalarna, Sweden. Her father, Lorentz Niclas Söderhielm (né Malmén), was an ironmaster and a soldier, who in 1693 was ennobled with the name Söderhielm, and her mother was Alleta Maria (née Cederberg).

== Career ==
Söderhielm assumed management of Ramnäs Ironworks following the death of her husband, Jacob Tersmeden the Younger, who died during a journey. She took responsibility for the ironworks, managing its finances and daily operations in 1767. Because her husband had served as a member of the Riksdag of the Estates and spent periods in Stockholm, Söderhielm had already gained substantial insight into the business during his lifetime. Her leadership earned her recognition and rewards from the king.

Söderhielm recognized the importance of the construction of the Strömsholm Canal, understanding that improved transport infrastructure would benefit Ramnäs Ironworks. Notably, she purchased shares in the very first canal company established in Sweden, standing out as the only woman among a group otherwise comprised entirely of male ironmasters. Her contributions to the project did not go unnoticed. Alongside Magnus Schenström, Söderhielm was rewarded by the king.

== Personal life ==
On 22 September 1743 Tersmeden married Jacob Tersmeden the Younger at World Heritage Site Engelsberg Ironworks. Their first child, Maria Elisabeth, was born in 1744. In total, they had 12 children.

During an inspection tour of the canal, King Gustav III scheduled a stop at Ramnäs. At the time, Söderhielm was ill and unable to greet the monarch personally. She instructed her sons to host the king on her behalf. Upon learning of Söderhielm's illness, King Gustav III traveled up to the manor house to personally thank her for the hospitality. Söderhielm passed away only a few days after the royal visit, on June 24, 1787, aged 68, after which ownership of Ramnäs Ironwork was transferred to one of her sons.

Söderhielm's brother-in-law, Axel Fredrik Cronstedt, discovered the chemical element nickel. She is also direct ancestor of the Hereditary Princess of Liechtenstein, Prince Joseph Wenzel of Liechtenstein, Princess Augusta of Eulenburg and Hertefeld and resistance fighter Libertas Schulze-Boysen.

In 2021, Axess TV aired a documentary series on the history of Swedish industry in Bergslagen, which followed Magdalena Elisabeth Söderhielm.
