= Borgåsund =

Locality in Hallstahammar Municipality, Sweden

Coordinates: 59°30′37″N 16°15′43″E

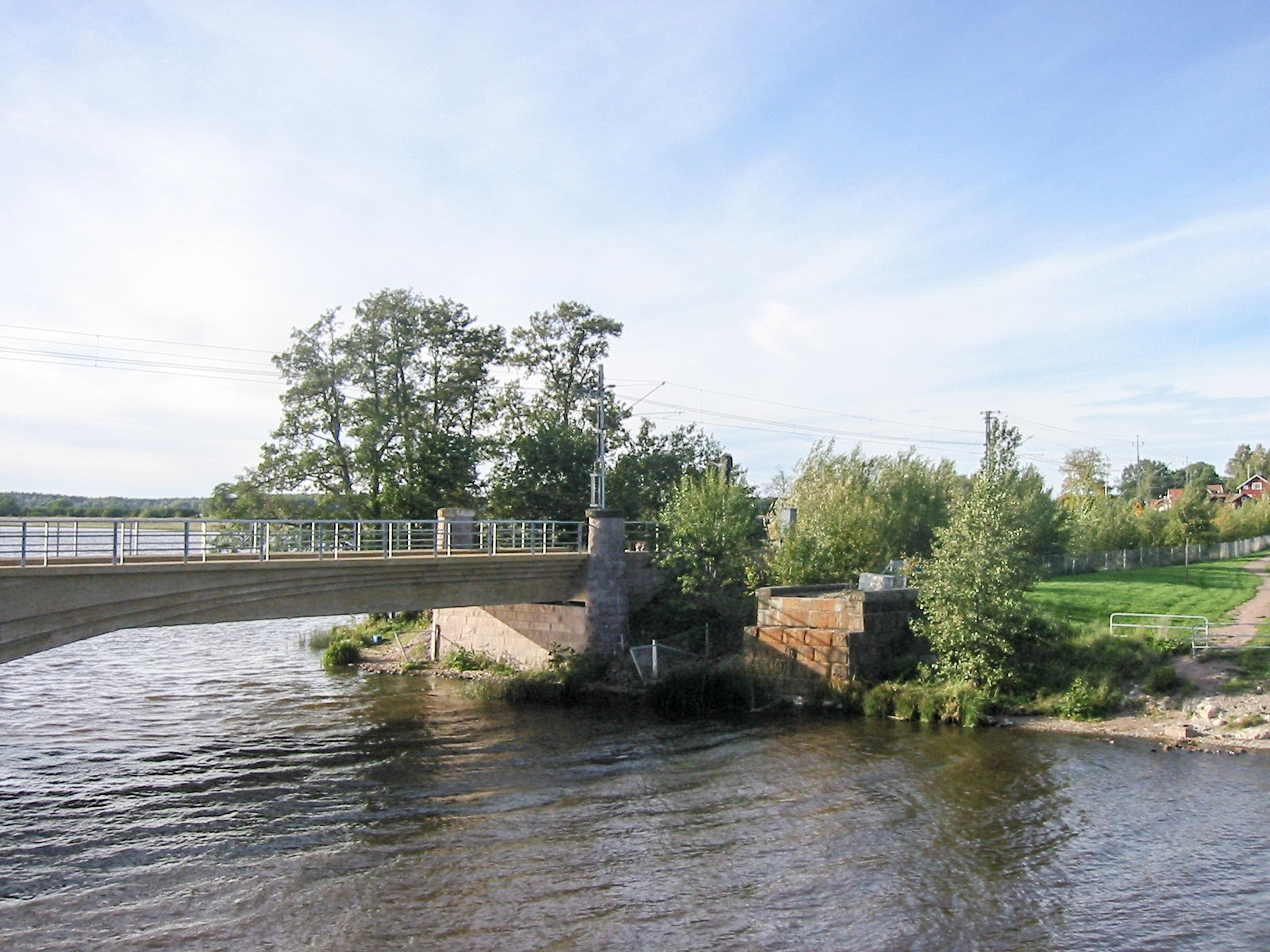
The railway bridge in Borgåsund.

Borgåsund is a locality in the vicinity of Strömsholm, located in Hallstahammar Municipality in Västmanland County in Sweden with 109 inhabitants in 2005.

Strömsholm Canal ends east of Borgåsund in the lake Mälaren.
