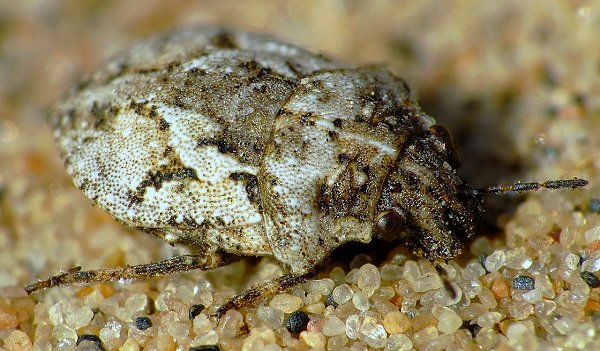

Scientific classification
- Kingdom: Animalia
- Phylum: Arthropoda
- Clade: Pancrustacea
- Class: Insecta
- Order: Hemiptera
- Suborder: Heteroptera
- Family: Scutelleridae
- Genus: Phimodera
- Species: P. humeralis

Binomial name
- Phimodera humeralis (Dalman, 1823)

Synonyms
- Phimodera bufonia Puton, 1888; Phimodera galgulina (Herrich-Schäffer, 1837); Phimodera nodicollis (Burmeister, 1835)

= Phimodera humeralis =

Species of true bug

Phimodera humeralis is a small mostly European shield-backed bug in the tribe Phimoderini. The species occurs primarily in Central Europe, extending to Northwestern Europe in the West and Russia in the East. It has a sparse distribution, and in Germany, Denmark, and the Netherlands only a few local populations are known.

== Description ==
The imago stage measures 5 to 7 millimetres (0.20 to 0.28 in) and ranges in colour from sandy ochre or pale brownto dark grey with light spots.

Phimodera humeralis is found in sparsely vegetated dune terrain on heaths and sandy hills, living on and especially in the sand around Carex arenaria, a 10–40 cm-high grass. P. humeralis is difficult to see, as from a distance they look like small light gray stones.

Adult (imago) P. humeralis hibernate through winter and mate in the spring. The mating takes about 10–15 minutes. The nymphs are 2.5 to 4 millimetres (0.10 to 0.16 in) and are usually found on the C. arenaria grass plants during June and July.

Phimodera humeralis is considered an endangered species, especially in northern Europe.
