= Hedvig Wegelin =

Hedvig Tersmeden
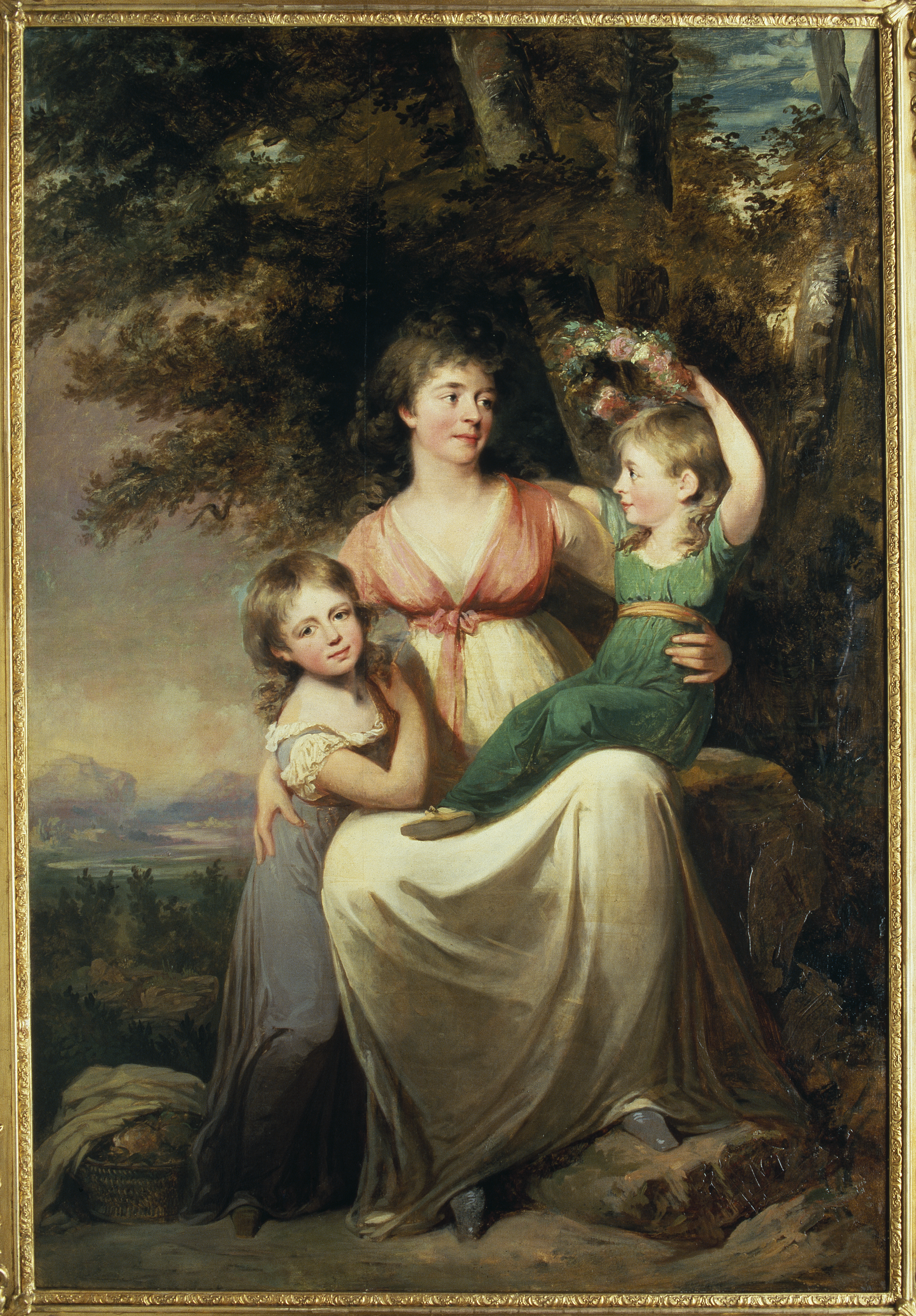
- Wegelin, and her two daughters, depicted in a painting by Carl Fredrik von Breda.
- Full name: Hedvig Tersmeden
- Native name: Hedvig Wegelin
- Born: 31 October 1766; Stockholm, Sweden
- Died: 18 August 1842 (aged 75); Kägleholm, Sweden
- Spouse: Jacob Niklas Tersmeden
- Father: Johan Wegelin
- Mother: Hedvig Schmeer

Hedvig Tersmeden (née Wegelin; 31 October 1766 – 18 August 1842) was a Swedish noblewoman, Swedish artists' model, known for being the depicted woman in a painting by Carl Fredrik von Breda named Hedvig Wegelin with daughters. Hedvig Wegelin is a direct ancestor of the Hereditary Princess of Liechtenstein.

== Biography ==
Wegelin was born into a bourgeoisie Stockholm family on 31 October 1766. She was the daughter of Johan Wegelin, a native of Swedish Livonia, and Hedvig Schméer. She moved from Stockholm to the estate of Hinseberg, but later died in Kägleholm. On 18 December 1783, Hedvig Wegelin married ironmaster Jacob Niclas Tersmeden in the parish of Näsby in Örebro County. In 1793, Jacob Niclas purchased Hinseberg and Kägleholm, with the help of the wife's inherited fortune.

In the following years, Wegelin and Tersmeden had four children:

- Jacob Johan Tersmeden (1785–1858)
- Carl Reinhold Tersmeden (1789–1855)
- Hedvig Elisabeth af Flodin (1790–1827)
- Maria Charlotta Ghan (1792–1816)

When her husband had died in 1822, Hedvig, now a widow, moved to Kägleholm, where she saw the necessity of starting a village school in Ödeby parish. The school was housed in the remaining parts of the old castle and the students were taught geography and history.
