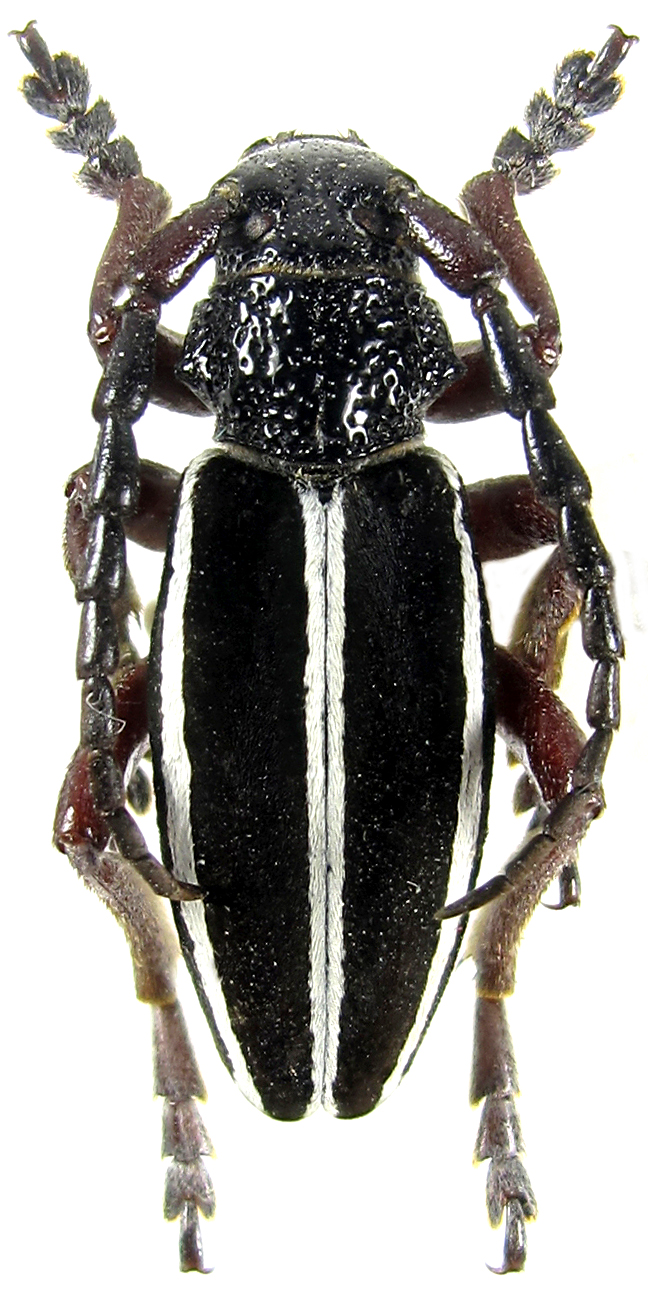
- Dorcadion (Cribridorcadion) scabricolle scabricolle (Dalman, 1817) (male, Georgia, Mtskheta)

Scientific classification
- Kingdom: Animalia
- Phylum: Arthropoda
- Clade: Pancrustacea
- Class: Insecta
- Order: Coleoptera
- Suborder: Polyphaga
- Infraorder: Cucujiformia
- Family: Cerambycidae
- Genus: Dorcadion
- Species: D. scabricolle

Binomial name
- Dorcadion scabricolle Dalman, 1817

Synonyms
- Lamia (Dorcadion) scabricolle Dalman, 1817; Dorcadion scabricolle var. lutescens Kraatz, 1873 (no locality); Dorcadion (Pedestredorcadion) scabricolle m. aeruginosum Breuning, 1946; Dorcadion (Pedestredorcadion) scabricolle m. albithorax Breuning, 1956 [unavailable name]; Dorcadion scabricolle m. corpulentum ab. supermodestum Plavilstchikov, 1958 [unavailable name]; Dorcadion scabricolle m. scabricolle ab. solitaneum Plavilstchikov, 1958 [unavailable name]; Dorcadion scabricolle m. masculochromum Plavilstchikov, 1958 [unavailable name]

= Dorcadion scabricolle =

Species of beetle

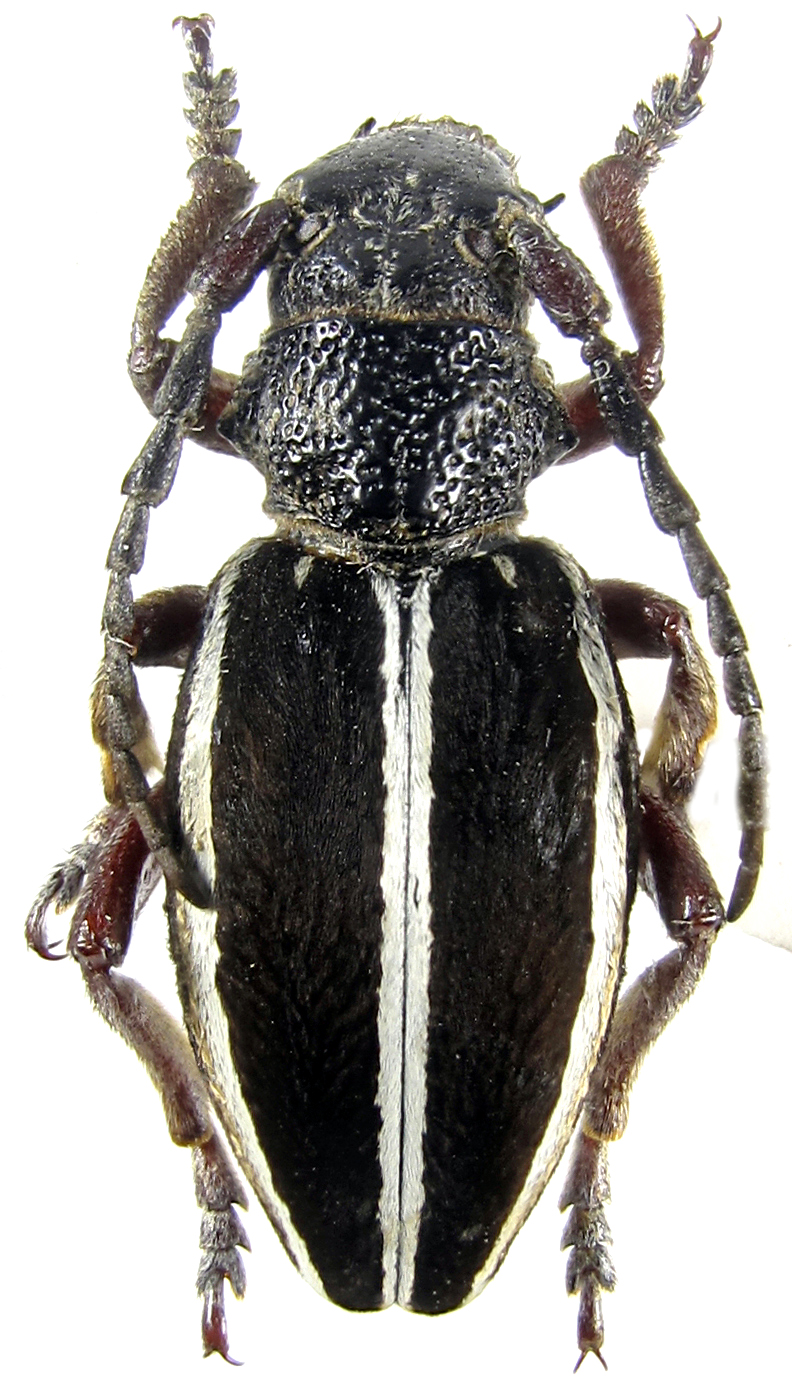
Dorcadion (Cribridorcadion) scabricolle scabricolle (Dalman, 1817) (female, Georgia, Mtskheta)

Dorcadion scabricolle is a species of beetle in the family Cerambycidae. It was described by Johan Wilhelm Dalman in 1817. It is known from Azerbaijan, Iran, Armenia, Georgia and Turkey.

== Name ==
Dorcadion (Cribridorcadion) scabricolle (Dalman, 1817): 174
Type locality. Georgia – according to the original description.
Distribution. About whole Transcaucasia (Georgia, Armenia, Azerbaijan), about whole Turkey (without European part), north-west half of Iran (southwards to about 36°).

Dorcadion (Cribridorcadion) scabricolle scabricolle (Dalman, 1817)
Distribution. Georgia, Kura River valley and southwards: Mtskheta environs; Tbilisi: Hudadovsky Forest and Tbilisi, Botanical Garden; Rustavi environs; Aspindza; Dmanisi, Kizylkilisa; Shaumyani; North Armenia: Bagratashen environs; North-West Azerbaijan, Akstafa distr., Poylu village, Kura River valley.

== Subspecies ==
- Dorcadion scabricolle alucranum Lazarev, 2020
- Dorcadion scabricolle apakoyense Lazarev, 2020
- Dorcadion scabricolle araxense Lazarev, 2020
- Dorcadion scabricolle artsakhense Lazarev, 2020
- Dorcadion scabricolle babakkalense Lazarev, 2020
- Dorcadion scabricolle balikesirense Breuning, 1962
- Dorcadion scabricolle buzgoviense Lazarev, 2020
- Dorcadion scabricolle caramanicum Daniel, 1903
- Dorcadion scabricolle crassofasciatum Özdikmen, 2013
- Dorcadion scabricolle gazii Lazarev, 2020
- Dorcadion scabricolle gegarkunicum Lazarev, 2020
- Dorcadion scabricolle gilanense Lazarev, 2020
- Dorcadion scabricolle hajdajorum Lazarev, 2020
- Dorcadion scabricolle inonuense Lazarev, 2020
- Dorcadion scabricolle korbianum Lazarev, 2020
- Dorcadion scabricolle lazistanum Lazarev, 2020
- Dorcadion scabricolle nakhicevanum Danilevsky, 1999
- Dorcadion scabricolle paiz Danilevsky, 1999
- Dorcadion scabricolle paphlagonicum Breuning, 1962
- Dorcadion scabricolle pseudosevangense Lazarev, 2020
- Dorcadion scabricolle sagezense Lazarev, 2020
- Dorcadion scabricolle sahandum Lazarev, 2020
- Dorcadion scabricolle salhanum Lazarev, 2020
- Dorcadion scabricolle scabricolle Dalman, 1817
- Dorcadion scabricolle sevangense Reitter, 1889
- Dorcadion scabricolle shakhbuzum Lazarev, 2020
- Dorcadion scabricolle shirakense Lazarev, 2020
- Dorcadion scabricolle skoupyi Lazarev, 2013
- Dorcadion scabricolle tavushense Lazarev, 2020
- Dorcadion scabricolle tekhense Lazarev, 2020
- Dorcadion scabricolle tuzovi Lazarev, 2020
- Dorcadion scabricolle uludaghicum Breuning, 1970
- Dorcadion scabricolle vaykense Lazarev, 2020
- Dorcadion scabricolle yahyaliense Bernhauer & Peks, 2011

== See also ==
- Dorcadion
