= Dorcadion politum =

Scientific classification
- Kingdom: Animalia
- Phylum: Arthropoda
- Clade: Pancrustacea
- Class: Insecta
- Order: Coleoptera
- Suborder: Polyphaga
- Infraorder: Cucujiformia
- Family: Cerambycidae
- Genus: Dorcadion
- Species: D. politum

Binomial name
- Dorcadion politum Dalman, 1823

Species of beetle

Dorcadion politum is a species of beetle in the family Cerambycidae. It was described by Johan Wilhelm Dalman in 1823.

== Subspecies ==
- Dorcadion politum akmolense Suvorov, 1911
- Dorcadion politum politum Dalman, 1823
- Dorcadion politum shapovalovi Danilevsky, 2006

== See also ==
- Dorcadion
