= Surahammar Municipality =

Surahammar Municipality Surahammars kommun
- Municipality
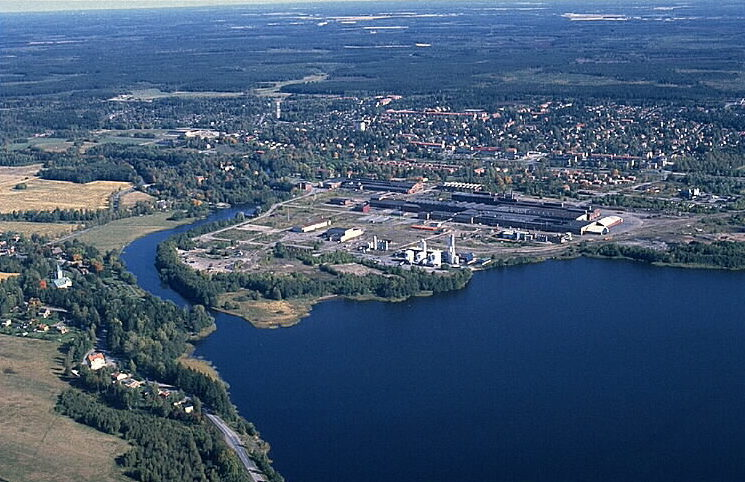

- Coat of arms

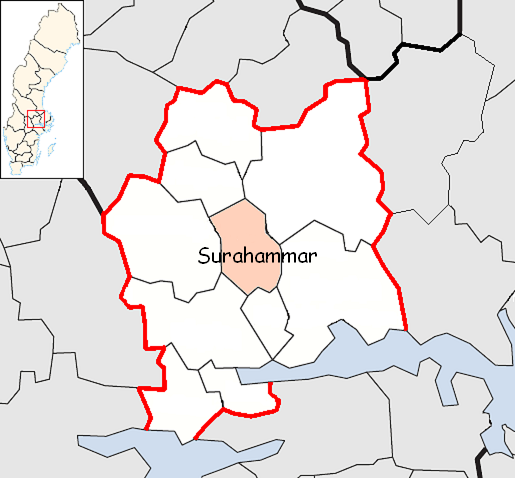
- Coordinates: 59°43′N 16°13′E
- Country: Sweden
- County: Västmanland County
- Seat: Surahammar

Area
  - Total: 368.85 km^{2} (142.41 sq mi)
  - Land: 343.81 km^{2} (132.75 sq mi)
  - Water: 25.04 km^{2} (9.67 sq mi)
- Area as of 1 January 2014.

Population (30 June 2025)
  - Total: 9,791
  - Density: 28.48/km^{2} (73.76/sq mi)
- Time zone: UTC+1 (CET)
  - Summer (DST): UTC+2 (CEST)
- ISO 3166 code: SE
- Province: Västmanland
- Municipal code: 1907
- Website: www.surahammar.se

Surahammar Municipality (Swedish: Surahammars kommun) is a municipality in Västmanland County in central Sweden. Its seat is located in the town of Surahammar.

The municipality is located some 100 km west of Stockholm in the southern part of the mineral-rich Bergslagen region.

The municipality was formed in 1963 through the amalgamation of Ramnäs and Sura.

== Localities ==
- Ramnäs
- Surahammar (seat)
- Virsbo

== History ==
Steelmaking in this municipality was started on a larger scale in the 16th and 17th centuries when forges were built there. It was a new phenomenon to run forge mills separate from mining and pig iron production sites in Bergslagen. The mills were located in Virsbo, Ramnäs and Surahammar and pig iron was transported from mills further north, initially by horse-sledges in the winter. There was ample local supply of hydropower to run the forge hammers and timber to make charcoal. Later, when Strömsholm Canal was finished, it was used to ship finished products to Västerås and Stockholm for export. This restructuring process appears to have been driven by the need to secure access to hydropower and timber for the forges since both the mines and blast furnaces used up considerable amounts of resources in the production of pig iron.

Over time, the mills specialised and in Ramnäs the key product became iron chains – in modern days for the off-shore industry – and in Surahammar wheel-sets for the rail road industry and electro steels, both with ASEA as a major customer.

In Surahammar, Gustaf Eriksson developed the first combustion-engine automobile built in Sweden in 1897. It formed the basis for a new Swedish industry that was located in Södertälje under the name of Vagnfabriks-Aktiebolaget i Södertelge (renamed in 1906 to Vabis that later merged with Scania AB).

Today, the mills in Virsbo, Ramnäs and Surahammar have been transformed into modern industries with international owners.

== Economy ==
Industry in Surahammar includes:

- Surahammars Bruk AB - electrical steels
- Adtranz Wheelset AB - wheelsets for the railroad industry
- Metso Powdermet
- Scana Ramnäs AB
- Uponor Wirsbo AB
- Ruukki Sverige AB, Virsbo

== Tourism ==
The Strömsholm Canal has been restored and is a popular route for small yachts. One can navigate from Strömsholm Palace, one of the Royal Palaces in Sweden at lake Mälaren to Fagersta and Smedjebacken through several canal locks and lakes, a total distance of 100 km.

Ecomuseum Bergslagen gives an in-depth view of how the early industrialization evolved in the Bergslagen region. It consists of some 40 sites.

== Demographics ==
This is a demographic table based on Surahammar Municipality's electoral districts in the 2022 Swedish general election sourced from SVT's election platform, in turn taken from SCB official statistics.

In total there were 10,073 residents, including 7,495 Swedish citizens of voting age. 44.4% voted for the left coalition and 54.6% for the right coalition. Indicators are in percentage points except population totals and income.

Location	Residents	Citizen adults	Left vote	Right vote	Employed	Swedish parents	Foreign heritage	Income SEK	Degree
Location			%	%					
Bruket-Landsbygd	1,683	1,204	37.9	60.9	83	80	20	26,967	31
Dalskogen	1,992	1,477	50.6	48.8	75	66	34	21,940	22
Ramnäs	1,633	1,222	48.1	50.7	78	73	27	23,415	22
Skogslund	1,625	1,251	46.2	52.7	82	75	25	25,162	27
Stavtorpet	1,696	1,213	41.7	57.3	87	79	21	27,554	29
Virsbo	1,444	1,128	42.0	57.0	75	65	35	22,561	17
Source: SVT

== Riksdag elections ==
Year	%	Votes	V	S	MP	C	L	KD	M	SD	NyD	Left	Right
1973	93.9	6,080	7.6	65.4		15.1	5.0	1.3	5.2			73.0	25.3
1976	94.4	6,421	6.0	65.1		14.1	7.0	0.8	6.6			71.1	27.6
1979	93.6	6,739	5.8	64.8		10.5	7.6	0.7	9.3			70.6	27.4
1982	93.9	6,913	6.2	68.1	0.9	8.4	4.0	1.3	11.0			74.3	23.4
1985	91.6	6,884	6.9	65.5	1.0	6.6	9.8		10.1			72.4	26.5
1988	86.5	6,601	8.1	64.2	3.7	5.2	8.6	1.9	7.9			76.0	21.7
1991	86.3	6,658	6.2	58.3	2.3	3.7	6.5	4.6	10.7		7.1	64.5	25.5
1994	87.6	6,738	9.4	62.7	4.1	3.2	5.1	2.2	10.9		1.4	76.2	21.3
1998	80.3	5,949	18.2	51.7	3.6	2.7	3.5	7.5	11.8			73.4	25.4
2002	77.8	5,604	11.5	57.8	3.5	3.8	8.7	5.6	7.2	0.9		72.9	25.3
2006	78.3	5,664	8.4	54.0	3.1	4.8	5.9	4.2	14.4	2.5		65.4	29.3
2010	83.5	6,159	7.9	49.1	4.1	2.8	5.7	2.9	19.4	7.0		61.1	30.7
2014	84.5	6,245	7.2	45.4	3.4	3.7	3.4	2.3	13.6	18.4		56.0	23.0
2018	85.1	6,241	8.2	36.4	1.9	4.0	3.4	4.2	13.0	27.5		50.5	48.0
2022	83.7	6,185	5.0	34.7	1.9	2.7	2.5	4.4	13.9	33.7		44.4	54.6
