= Wegelin =

Wegelin may refer to:

== People ==
- Adolph Wegelin (1810–1881), German architectural painter
- August Wegelin (1840–1902), German entrepreneur
- Émile Wegelin (1875–1962), French rower
- Georg Wegelin (1558–1627), abbot of Weingarten
- Hans Mayer-Wegelin (1897–1983), German forestry scientist
- Hedvig Wegelin (1766–1842), Swedish noblewoman
- Jakob Wegelin (historian) (1721–1791), Swiss historian
- Johann Wegelin (SA member) (1900–1968), German SA member
- Johann Reinhard Wegelin (1689–1764), German historian
- Josua Wegelin (1604–1640), Protestant hymn writer
- Jürg Wegelin (born 1944), Swiss journalist
- Karl Wegelin (1803–1856), Swiss historian and archivist
- Martin Wegelin (born 1947), Swiss civil engineer
- Michael August Wegelin (1797–1867), Swiss lawyer and politician
- Natascha Wegelin (born 1985), German author
- Thomas Wegelin (1577–1629), German Lutheran theologian

== Other ==
- Wegelin & Co., Swiss company
