= Carl Reinhold Tersmeden =

Swedish politician (1789–1855)

- Born: 9 February 1789; Larsbo, Sweden
- Died: 21 July 1855 (aged 66); Medinge, Sweden
- Occupations: Politician; factory manager; landowner; military personnel
- Spouse: Gustava Charlotta Tersmeden (m. 1822)
- Children: 4
- Relatives: Jakob Niklas Tersmeden (father); Hedvig Wegelin (mother)

Carl Reinhold Tersmeden (9 February 1789 – 21 July 1855) was a Swedish Army ryttmästare and politician. He served as the first chairperson of the first reform meeting in Örebro (Swedish: Reformmötena i Örebro).

== Early life ==
Carl Reinhold Tersmeden was born into the Tersmeden family, at Larsbo, but grew up at the family estate 27 km northeast of Örebro, Sweden, and 190 kmwest of Stockholm. He was the second of four children to ironmaster Jakob Niclas Tersmeden (1745–1822) and Hedvig Wegelin (1766–1842).

== Career ==
After having advanced as quartermaster at Life Regiment Hussars in 1807, he was commissioned as cornet in the same year and was three years later promoted to lieutenant there. In 1812, he advanced to ryttmästare and in the following year, Tersmeden was appointed head quartermaster of the regiment. In 1822, Tersmeden was no longer active as military personnel.

Tersmeden was the manager of Larsbo and Saxe in Söderbärke parish, Kopparberg County, and served as deputy at Järnkontoret in 1842–1847 and at The Falun School of Mining and Metallurgy in 1844–1847.

Tersmeden was member of parliament in 1828–1830, as well as in 1840–1841 and 1844–1845, serving the interests of the nobility in the assembly of the feudal estates of Sweden.

In 1849, he became the first chairperson at the first the reform meeting in Örebro, a number of gatherings where the attendees were in favor of a new state administration, including a suffrage reform, as well as abolition of the assembly of feudal estates of Sweden. Tersmeden was noted for his great public persona, and for his aim as to abolish the former feudal state administration order.

== Personal life ==
Tersmeden had an interest in history as well as botany, and was accordingly interested in the Scandinavian flora. He was also known to be a heavy subscriber to newsletters and journals from around the world. In 1825, the cost of his subscriptions amounted to 41 Swedish riksdaler. He had especially a vivid interest in Italy and its archaeological history.

In the 1820s, Tersmeden built Medinge Manor. The manor house was then inherited by his firstborn son Wilhelm Reinhold Tersmeden.

On 21 February 1822 at Österrasta, Fellingsbro parish, Tersmeden married his first cousin Gustava Charlotta Tersmeden (1802–1883), a daughter of Lars Gustaf Tersmeden and Hedvig Elisabeth Schön. They had four children, two of whom survived childhood.

Tersmeden died on 21 July 1855, aged 66, at Medinge.
