= Hinseberg Manor =

Coordinates: 59.4585°N 15.3595°E

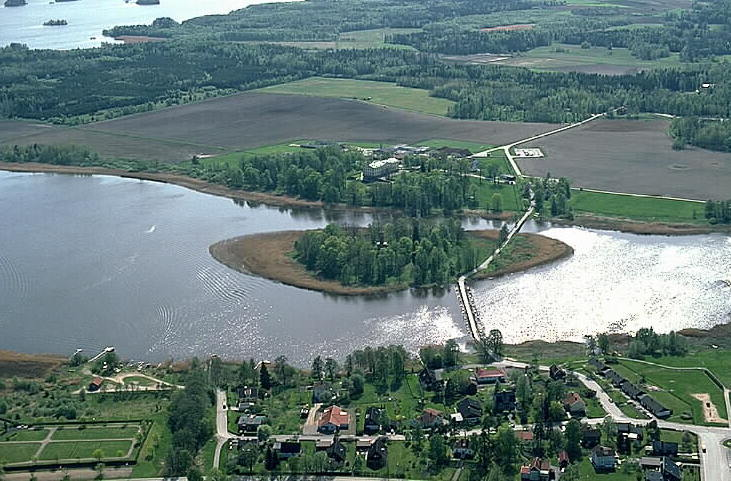
- Interactive map of the Hinseberg Manor area

General information
- Type: Manor house
- Architectural style: Italian Renaissance
- Location: Frövi, Sweden
- Construction started: 18th century
- Completed: 1803

Design and construction
- Architect: Johan Gustaf Forsgren

Hinseberg Manor (Swedish: Hinsebergs herrgård) is a women's prison as of today but has formerly served as a residence for several bourgeois and noble families. The property is located next to lake Väringen in Frövi, Sweden. The manor that exists today was built in 1803 by Jacob Niclas Tersmeden (1745–1822).

== Architecture ==
Hinseberg is architecturally inspired by the Italian Renaissance style. The architect was Johan Gustaf Forsgren.

== History ==
The first known owner of the property was Mats Pedersson, he was first mentioned in the year of 1420. He belonged to the so-called Hinseberg family that owned Hinseberg for six generations, spanning almost 200 years.

During the 17th century the property was owned by Magnus Gabriel De la Gardie but he could not keep up economically so he had to sell Hinseberg, including several other properties around lake Väringen to the Dalman family.

For the most part of the 18th century, the property of Hinseberg was owned by the Dalman family, including physician and naturalist Johan Wilhelm Dalman.

Jacob Niclas Tersmeden bought the Hinseberg property in the 1790s. The property also included Kägleholm and Medinge.

The main building, built in 1803, was built in Italian Renaissance style, and it holds more than 50 rooms on three floors. The first residents of the manor built in 1803 were Jacob Niclas Tersmeden and Hedvig Wegelin. The manor was later inherited by the first-born son of Jacob Niclas Tersmeden, Jacob Johan Tersmeden (1785–1858). It was then inherited by Jacob Theodor Tersmeden (1827–1885), and later by Jacob August Tersmeden (1855–1909).

The property was after the so-called Tersmeden dynasty acquired by Victor Hybinette.

In the 1940s, the property served as a nursing home for boys with psychiatrical disorders.

Hinseberg has been a women's prison since 1960. Since the inauguration of the prison, prison-modules has been added to the property.

Hinseberg is the biggest prison for women in Sweden. As of 2020, the prison can accommodate 96 women clients and 14 places of detention. There is, among other things, a textile printing company, as well as several workshop chores, such as packing screws.
