= Virsbo =

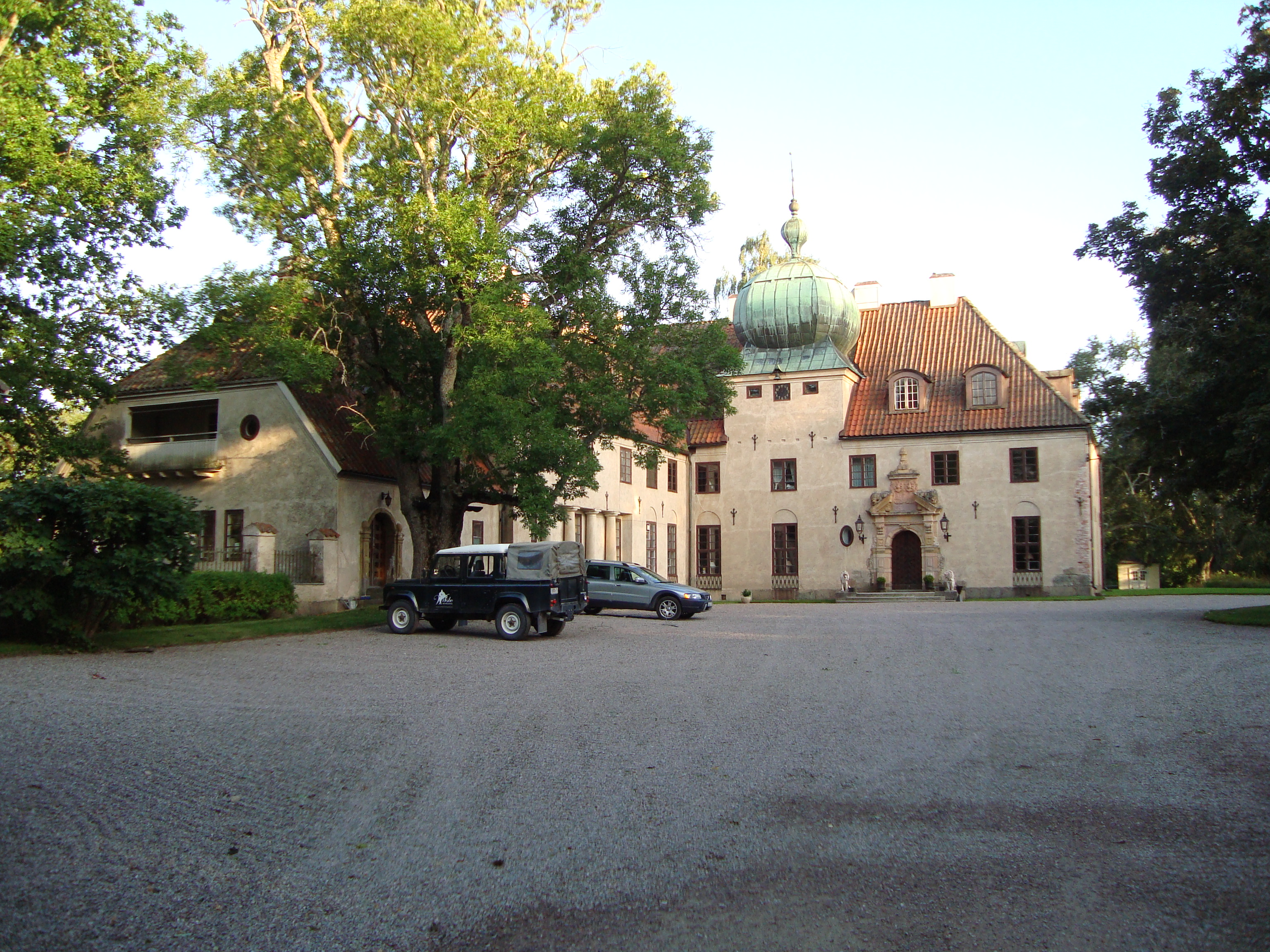
- Virsbo mansion

- Location within Sweden
- Coordinates: 59°52′N 16°02′E
- Country: Sweden
- Province: Västmanland
- County: Västmanland County
- Municipality: Surahammar Municipality

Area
  - Total: 2.05 km^{2} (0.79 sq mi)

Population (31 December 2010)
  - Total: 1,517
  - Density: 741/km^{2} (1,920/sq mi)
- Time zone: UTC+1 (CET)
  - Summer (DST): UTC+2 (CEST)

Virsbo (Swedish pronunciation: [ˈvɪ̌ʂːbʊ]) is a locality situated in Surahammar Municipality, Västmanland County, Sweden with 1,517 inhabitants in 2010.
