= Surahammar =

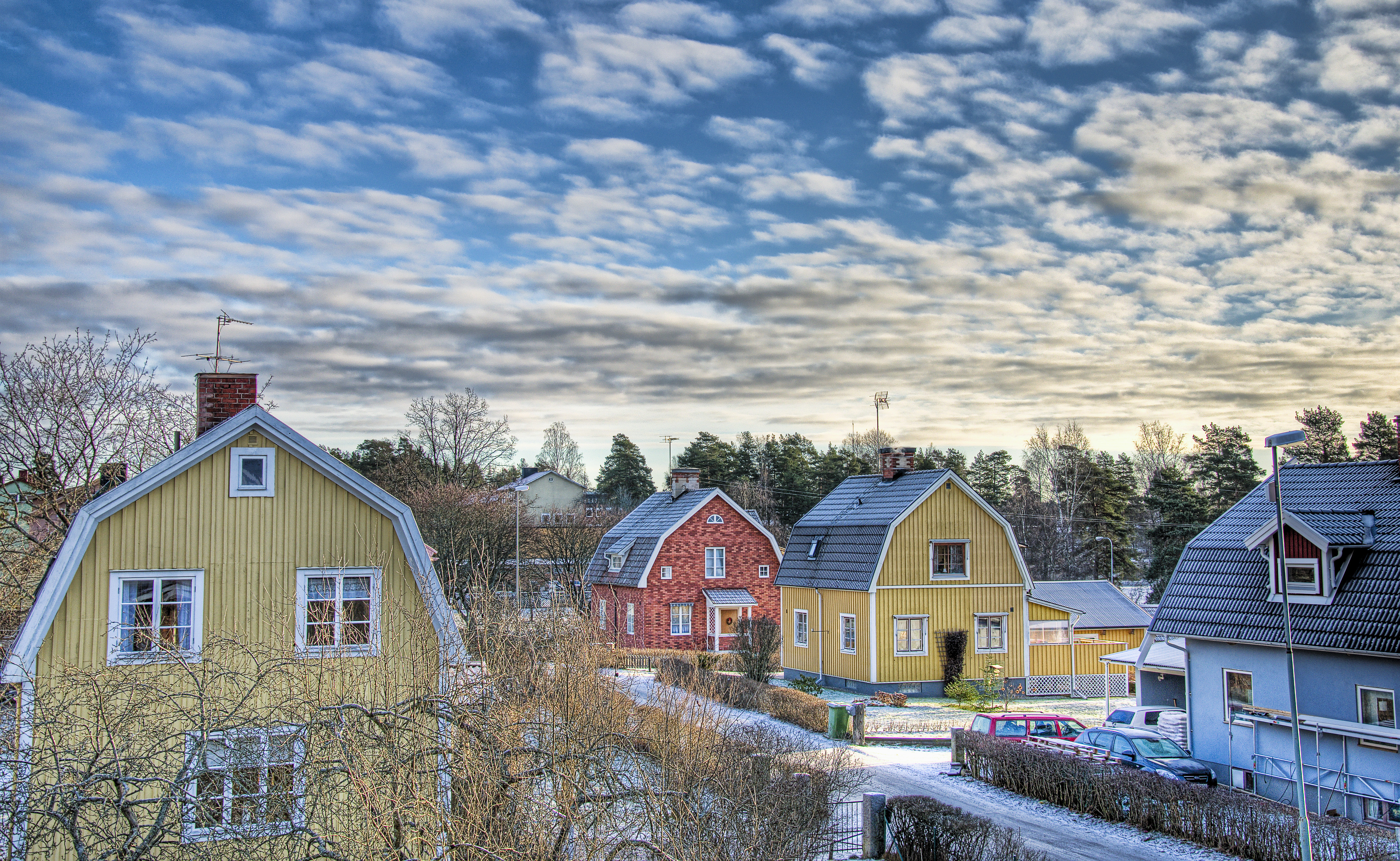
- Skogslund, Surahammar in January 2009

- Location within Västmanland Location within Sweden
- Coordinates: 59°43′N 16°13′E
- Country: Sweden
- Province: Västmanland
- County: Västmanland County
- Municipality: Surahammar Municipality

Area
  - Total: 5.49 km^{2} (2.12 sq mi)

Population (31 December 2010)
  - Total: 6,179
  - Density: 1,126/km^{2} (2,920/sq mi)
- Time zone: UTC+1 (CET)
  - Summer (DST): UTC+2 (CEST)

Surahammar (Swedish pronunciation: [sɵraˈhâmːar] or [ˈsʉ̂ːraˌhamːar]) is a locality and the seat of Surahammar Municipality in Västmanland County, Sweden, with 6,179 inhabitants in 2010.

== History ==
During the reign of Gustav Vasa, there was a hammer in Surahammar. However, it is not known when the operation started, but it must have been before the year 1561. In 1637, a hammer with two hearths was erected by Axel Oxenstierna on the site where the current mill is located. In 1866, railway wheels and axles began to be manufactured and have been an important part of production ever since.

Towards the end of the 19th century, the sale of railway material declined. The mill's subsidiary Vagnfabriks-Aktiebolaget in Södertälge (Vabis) was therefore looking for new products to sell. The newly hired engineer Gustaf Erikson was sent on a study trip to Europe and back in Surahammar he built Sweden's first internal combustion engine car, which was his own construction with a kerosene engine. Vabi's first car hit the market in 1901.

== Culture and sights ==
Hembygdsgården contains historic buildings with objects, serving all year round at events.

The stone house is used for art exhibitions and is also the start and finish of the 2.5 km "historical walk" with information boards with unique historical images.

The Golden Wheel MC Museum contains, in addition to motorcycles and bicycles, a drivable replica of Sweden's first car, Gustaf Eriksson's carriage from 1897. The museum building has unique murals. Surahammar's mills museum shows the production chain from pig iron to railway wheels.
