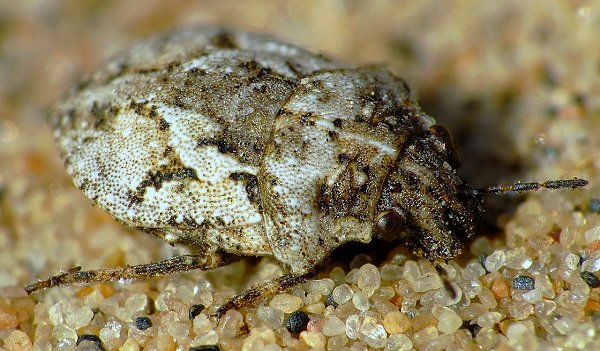
- Phimodera humeralis

Scientific classification
- Domain: Eukaryota
- Kingdom: Animalia
- Phylum: Arthropoda
- Class: Insecta
- Order: Hemiptera
- Suborder: Heteroptera
- Family: Scutelleridae
- Subfamily: Odontotarsinae
- Genus: Phimodera; Germar, 1839

= Phimodera =

Genus of true bugs

Phimodera is a genus of shield-backed bugs, typical of the tribe Phimoderini. Species in Phimodera have been recorded from Africa, Europe and North America.

== Species ==
BioLib includes:

1. Phimodera amblygonia Fieber, 1863
2. Phimodera bergi Jakovlev, 1905
3. Phimodera binotata (Say, 1824)
4. Phimodera carinata Reuter, 1879
5. Phimodera curvipilis Kerzhner, 1976
6. Phimodera dlabolai Hoberlandt, 1974
7. Phimodera emeljanovi Kerzhner, 1976
8. Phimodera flori Fieber, 1863
9. Phimodera fumosa Fieber, 1863
10. Phimodera hispanica Fuente, 1971
11. Phimodera humeralis (Dahlmann, 1823)
12. Phimodera jaxartensis Kerzhner, 1976
13. Phimodera kaszabi Hoberlandt, 1968
14. Phimodera kiborti Jakovlev, 1889
15. Phimodera laevilinea Stål, 1873
16. Phimodera lapponica (Zetterstedt, 1828)
17. Phimodera mongolica Reuter, 1891
18. Phimodera montana Kerzhner, 1976
19. Phimodera nigra Reuter, 1879
20. Phimodera oculata Jakovlev, 1880
21. Phimodera reuteri Kiritshenko, 1910
22. Phimodera rupshuensis Hutchinson, 1934
23. Phimodera semideserta Kerzhner, 1976
24. Phimodera sibirica Kerzhner, 1976
25. Phimodera smolini Kerzhner, 1976
26. Phimodera testudo Jakovlev, 1894
27. Phimodera torpida Walker, 1867
28. Phimodera torrida Reuter, 1906
29. Phimodera tuberculata Jakovlev, 1874
