= Baron Tersmeden =

- Creation date: 29 June 1809
- First holder: Fredrik Tersmeden, 1st Baron Tersmeden
- Last holder: Adolf Tersmeden, 3rd Baron Tersmeden
- Remainder to: Heirs male of the body of the first baron
- Extinction date: 9 May 1914

Baron Tersmeden (Swedish: Friherre Tersmeden), was a title in the Peerage of Sweden. It was created in 1809 for Fredrik Tersmeden, a member of the Tersmeden family. The last holder of the title was Adolf Tersmeden, 3rd Baron Tersmeden who inherited the title in 1879.
