= Tersmeden =

Swedish noble family

- Swedish noble family
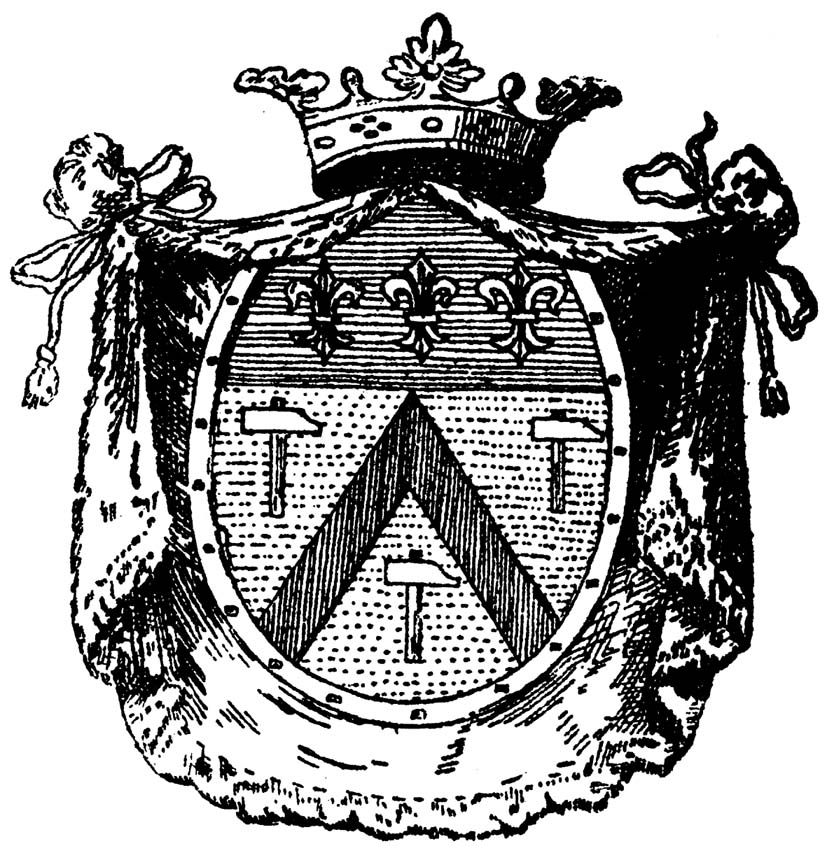
- Country: Sweden
- Current region: Nordic countries
- Origin: Stade, Lower Saxony, Holy Roman Empire
- Founded: 1751
- Titles: List: Baron Tersmeden (1809)
- Estates: List: Hinseberg; Medinge; Ramnäs
- Cadet branches: List: Hinseberg branch; Hessle branch; Hellby branch; Håberg branch

The Tersmeden family, originally tor Smede, is a Swedish noble family of German descent, originally from Stade, Lower Saxony that rose to prominence in the 15th-century with Thomas tor Smede, founder of one of the most prominent trading companies in northern Germany. The family was elevated to noble rank in the Kingdom of Sweden in 1751, and got introduced at the House of Nobility in 1752. The Tersmeden family consists of several branches of different noble ranks.

During the 19th century, the Tersmeden family possessed several ironworks, where they made a fortune. The family's wealth declined over the 20th century, once they had wound up their business interests in ironworks.

== Prominent descendants of Jacob Tersmeden ==
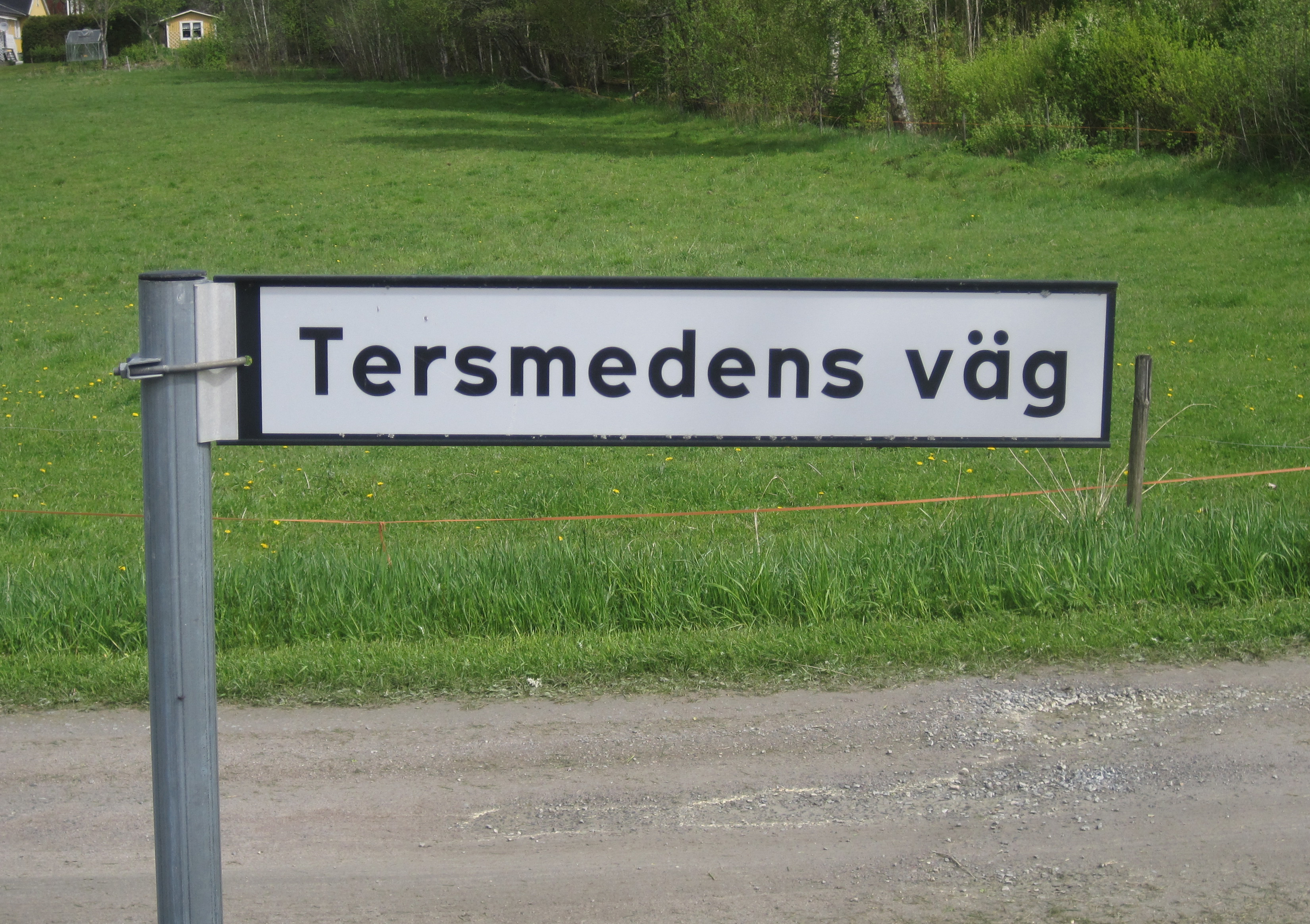
Tersmedens väg in Larsbo, Sweden

Prominent lineal descendants of Jacob Tersmeden include among many others:

- Ann-Margret Holmgren (née Tersmeden; 1850–1940)
- Princess Augusta of Eulenburg and Hertefeld (1853–1943)
- Count Botho Sigwart zu Eulenburg (1884–1915)
- Count Carl Adam Lewenhaupt (1947–2017)
- Carl Tersmeden (1715–1797)
- Carl Reinhold Tersmeden (1789–1855)
- Prince Friedrich Wend zu Eulenburg (1881–1963)
- Jacob Tersmeden (1712–1767)
- Prince Joseph Wenzel of Liechtenstein (born 1995)
- Libertas Schulze-Boysen (1913–1942)
- Duchess Rosita Spencer-Churchill of Marlborough (born 1943)
- Hereditary Princess Sophie of Liechtenstein (born 1967)

Prominent marriages into the family include, among many others:

This is a dynamic list and may never be able to satisfy particular standards for completeness. You can help by adding missing items with reliable sources.

- Hedvig Wegelin (1766–1842), married Jacob Niclas Tersmeden (1745–1822)
- Baron Viktor von Düben (1818–1867), of the von Düben family, married Lotten Tersmeden (1826–1892)
- Archbishop Uno von Troil (1746–1803) of the von Troil family, married Magdalena Tersmeden (1753–1794)
- Lorentz Peter Söderhielm (1717–1803) of the Söderhielm family, married Ulrica Tersmeden

== See also ==
- Hinseberg
- Ramnäs
