= Carl Tersmeden =

Swedish admiral and diarist

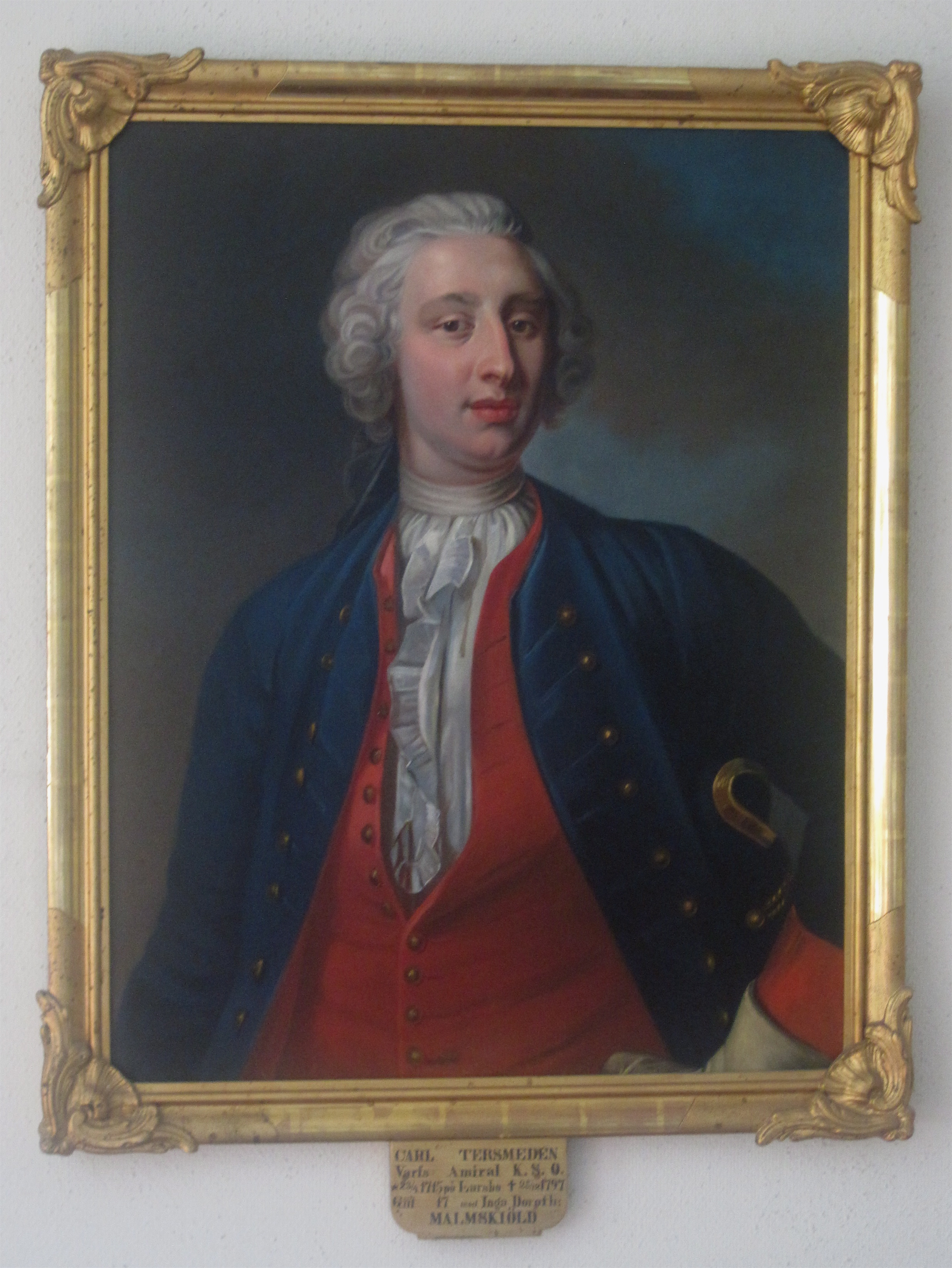
- Born: Carl Tersmeden; 23 April 1715; Larsbo, Dalarna, Sweden
- Died: 25 December 1797 (aged 82)
- Occupations: Admiral and diarist

Carl Tersmeden (23 April 1715 – 25 December 1797) was a Swedish admiral and diarist.

== Life ==
=== Early years ===
Carl Tersmeden was born on 23 April 1715 at Larsbo, Dalarna, as the son of Jacob Tersmeden the Elder and Elisabeth Gangia and thus the younger brother of Jacob Tersmeden the Younger. His father had good connections in the Swedish Navy, such as Claes Sparre, allowing Carl to rise rapidly through the ranks and fight in several Swedish naval engagements of the 1700s.

== Literary career ==
Tersmeden also wrote lengthy memoirs under the title Lefnadsjournaler, which finally totalled some 11,000 folio pages and are often detailed descriptions of society, his own deeds, naval battles and the performance of the Gustafs skål on revolution-night, 19 August 1772, in honour of Gustav III of Sweden. They were edited by Nils Erdmann and Nils Sjöberg in six volumes and published from 1912 to 1919.

== Sources ==
- (in Swedish) Svensk Tidskrift / Sjunde årgången. 1917
- (in Swedish) Svenskt biografiskt handlexikon
- (in Swedish) Biblioteksbladet / Elfte årgången. 1926
