= Jacob Tersmeden the Younger =

Swedish nobleman, ironmaster and member of parliament

Jacob Tersmeden
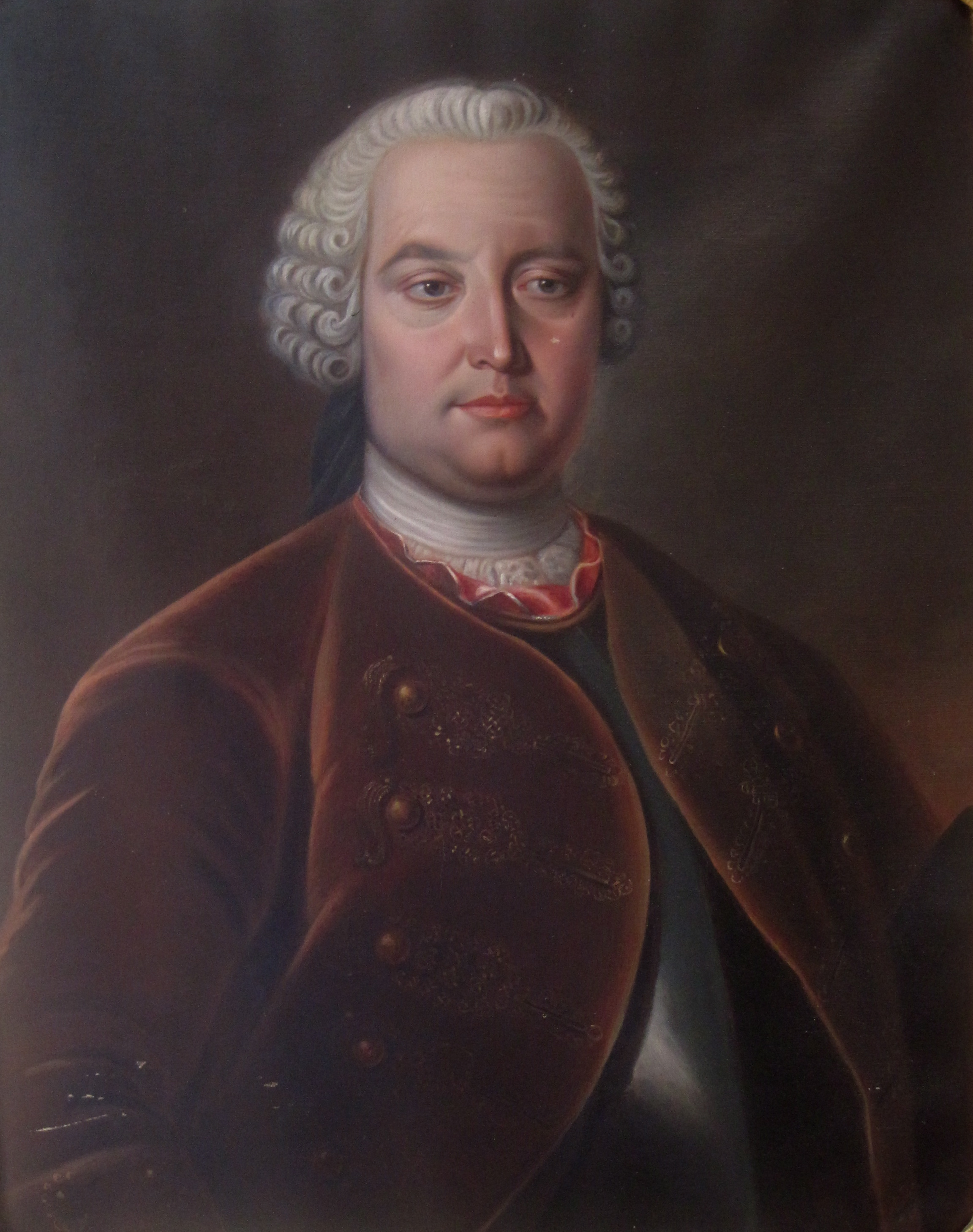
- Born: 20 May 1712; Söderbärke, Dalarna, Sweden
- Died: 9 February 1767 (aged 54); Hedemora, Dalarna, Sweden
- Burial place: Tersmedenska gravkortet, Söderbärke Church, Dalarna, Sweden
- Education: Uppsala University
- Occupations: Ironmaster, member of parliament
- Political party: Hats
- Spouse: Magdalena Elisabeth Söderhielm (m. 1743)
- Children: Maria Elisabeth Tersmeden; Jacob Niclas Tersmeden; Hedvig Charlotta Tersmeden; Carl Tersmeden; Per Reinhold Tersmeden; Fredrik Tersmeden; Lona von Troil; Lars Gustaf Tersmeden; Ulrika Gyllenbååt; Herman Adolf Tersmeden; Erik August Tersmeden; Benjamin Tersmeden
- Parents: Jacob Tersmeden (father); Elisabeth Gangia (mother)
- Family: Tersmeden

Jacob Tersmeden (20 May 1712 – 9 February 1767) was a Swedish nobleman, ironmaster, assessor and member of the Riksdag of the Estates representing the House of Nobility, and brother of renowned diarist Carl Tersmeden.

== Life ==
=== Early years ===
Jacob Tersmeden was born on 20 May 1712 in Larsbo, Söderbärke, Dalarna, the son of Jacob Tersmeden and Elisabeth Gangia. He was brought up on his father's estate close to Söderbärke.

=== Education ===
Tersmeden started to study at Uppsala University, aged eight, in 1720. He was enrolled as a student at the Swedish Board of Mines, aged sixteen, to study mineralogy. Instead of continuing studying sciences, he started to shoulder administrative tasks at Larsbo bruk.

== Career ==
Tersmeden served as ironmaster to Ramnäs. After he had suddenly passed in 1767, his wife Magdalena Elisabeth Söderhielm, shouldered the role as ironmaster.

=== Politics ===
Tersmeden was member of parliament in 1755–1756. He did so as the head of the Tersmedens, serving the interests of his noble family in the assembly of the feudal estates of Sweden. From 1760 to 1762, his younger brother, Carl, shouldered the role as representant of the Tersmedens at the Riksdag of the Estates.

== Personal life ==
=== Marriage ===
On 22 September 1743 Tersmeden married Magdalena Elisabeth Söderhielm, also known as Lona Lisa, at World Heritage Site Engelsberg Ironworks.

Tersmeden's and Söderhielm's first child, Maria Elisabeth, was born in 1744.

Tersmeden is a direct ancestor of the Hereditary Princess of Liechtenstein, Princess Augusta of Eulenburg and Hertefeld and resistance fighter Libertas Schulze-Boysen.

=== Death ===
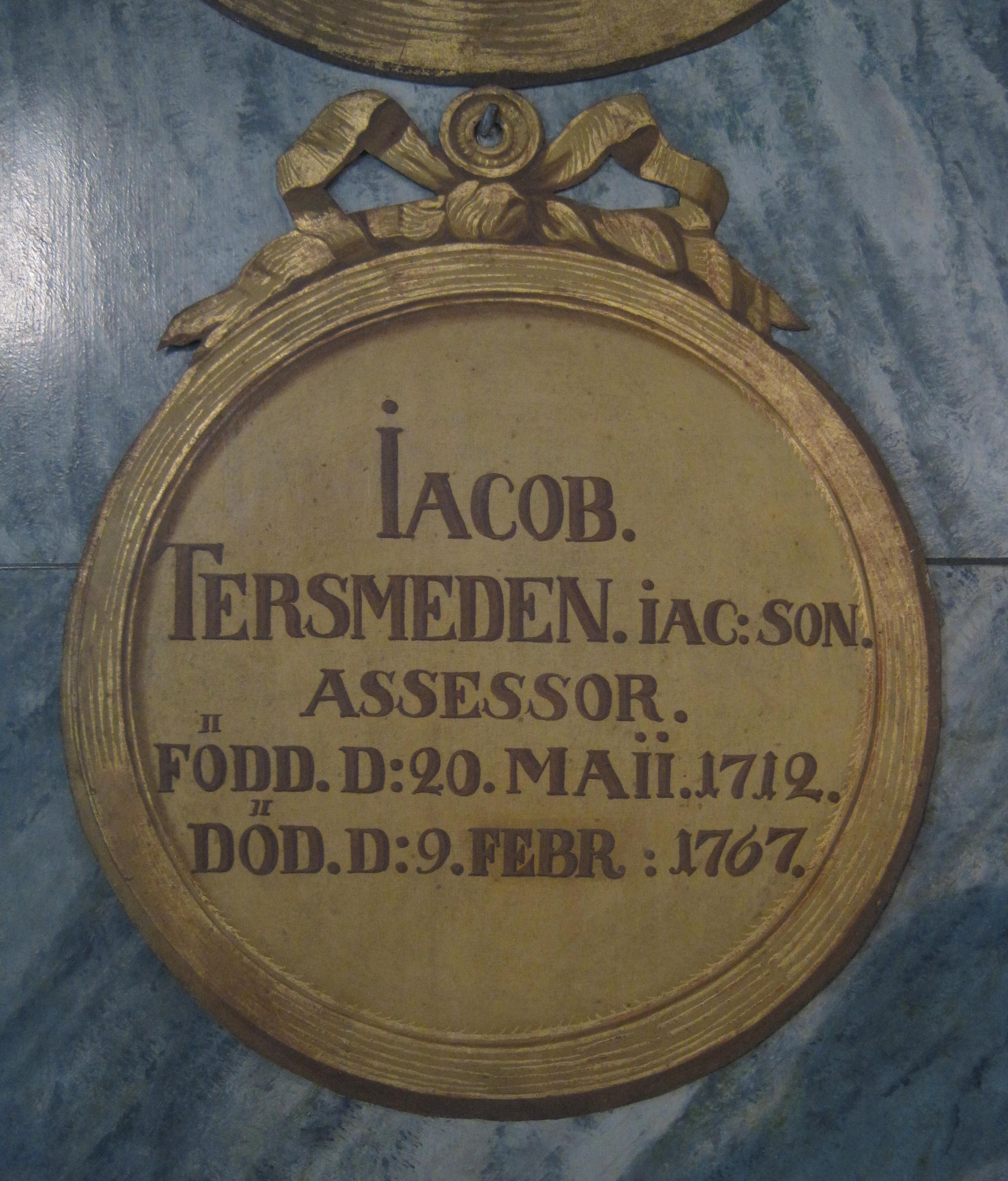
Jacob Tersmeden's nameplate in the Söderbärke Church.

Tersmeden died on 9 February 1767, aged 54, in Hedemora. He was buried on 3 March in the Tersmeden grave near the altar at Söderbärke Church.
