= Phimodera binotata =

Scientific classification
- Domain: Eukaryota
- Kingdom: Animalia
- Phylum: Arthropoda
- Class: Insecta
- Order: Hemiptera
- Suborder: Heteroptera
- Family: Scutelleridae
- Genus: Phimodera
- Species: P. binotata

Binomial name
- Phimodera binotata (Say, 1824)

Species of true bug

Phimodera binotata is a species of shield-backed bug in the family Scutelleridae. It is found in North America.
