= Söderhielm family =

Swedish noble family

Söderhielm Söderhjelm
- Swedish noble family
- Country: Finland and Sweden
- Current region: Nordic countries
- Founded: 1693
- Founder: Lorentz Niclas Söderhielm (née Malmén)

The Söderhielm family is a Finnish and Swedish noble family. The family was elevated to noble rank in the Kingdom of Sweden in 1693, and got introduced at the House of Nobility in 1697.

Notable members of the family include ironmaster Lorentz Niclas Söderhielm and his daughter, Magdalena Elisabeth Söderhielm. The family is also linked to major scientific history through another Söderhielm, who was the spouse of Axel Fredrik Cronstedt, who discovered the chemical element nickel. Furthermore, the Finnish branch of the family produced several figures, notably the historian, and the first woman to hold a professorship in Finland, Alma Söderhjelm.
