= Kägleholm Castle =

Swedish castle ruin

Coordinates: 59.4047°N 15.4154°E

- Part of Fortifications of Sweden
- Kägleholm
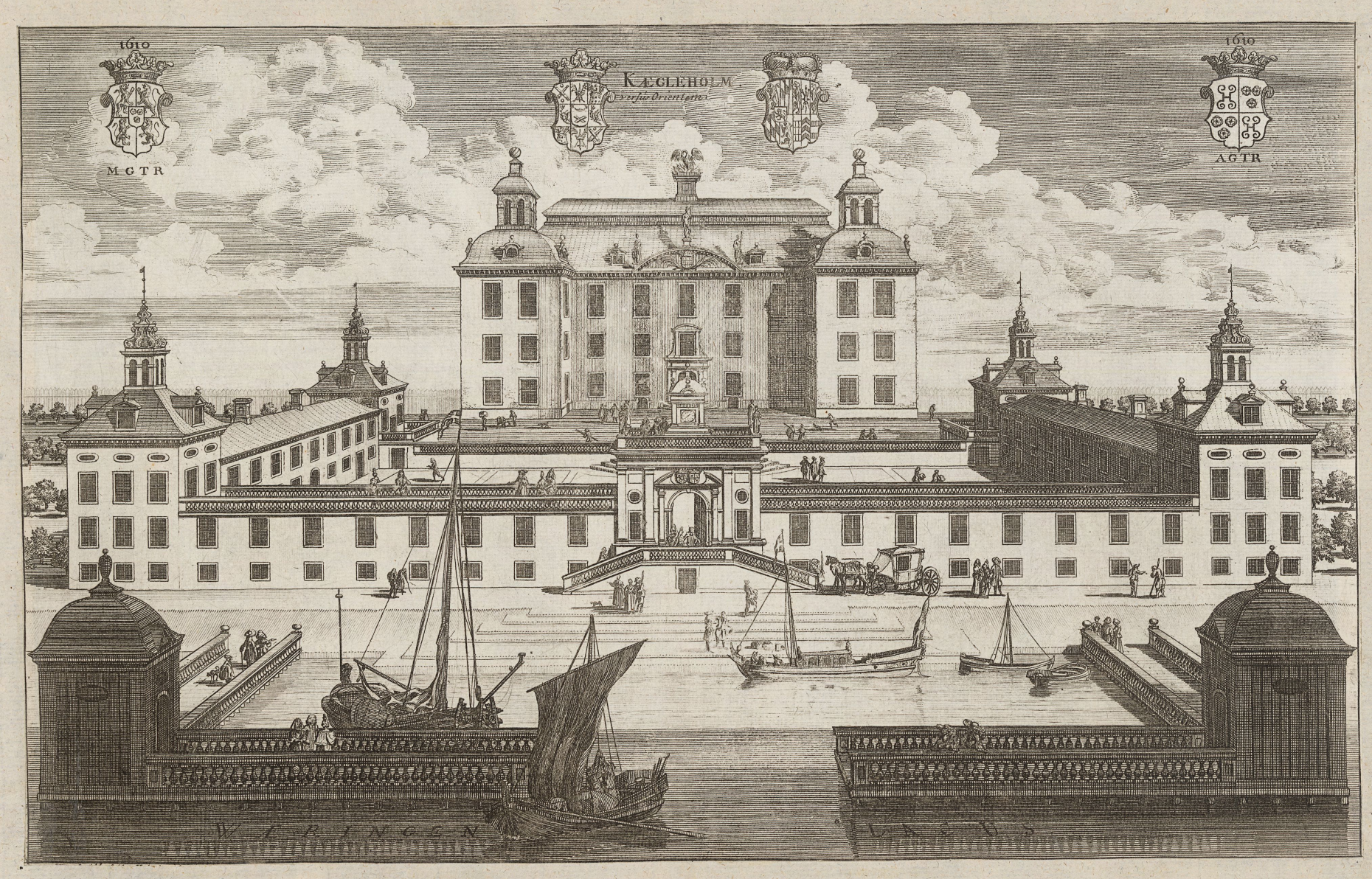
- The Kägleholm Castle in 1694.

Site information
- Type: Castle
- Condition: Ruined

Site history
- In use: 1680–1712

Kägleholm Castle (Kägleholms slott) is a castle ruin located in Kägleholm, Örebro County, Sweden.

In 1541, the estate became a manor and was named Kägleholm. In 1674, Magnus Gabriel De la Gardie (1622–1686) inherited Kägleholm, and the castle was completed by 1680. However, the castle burned down in 1712 and was subsequently abandoned.

== Gallery ==
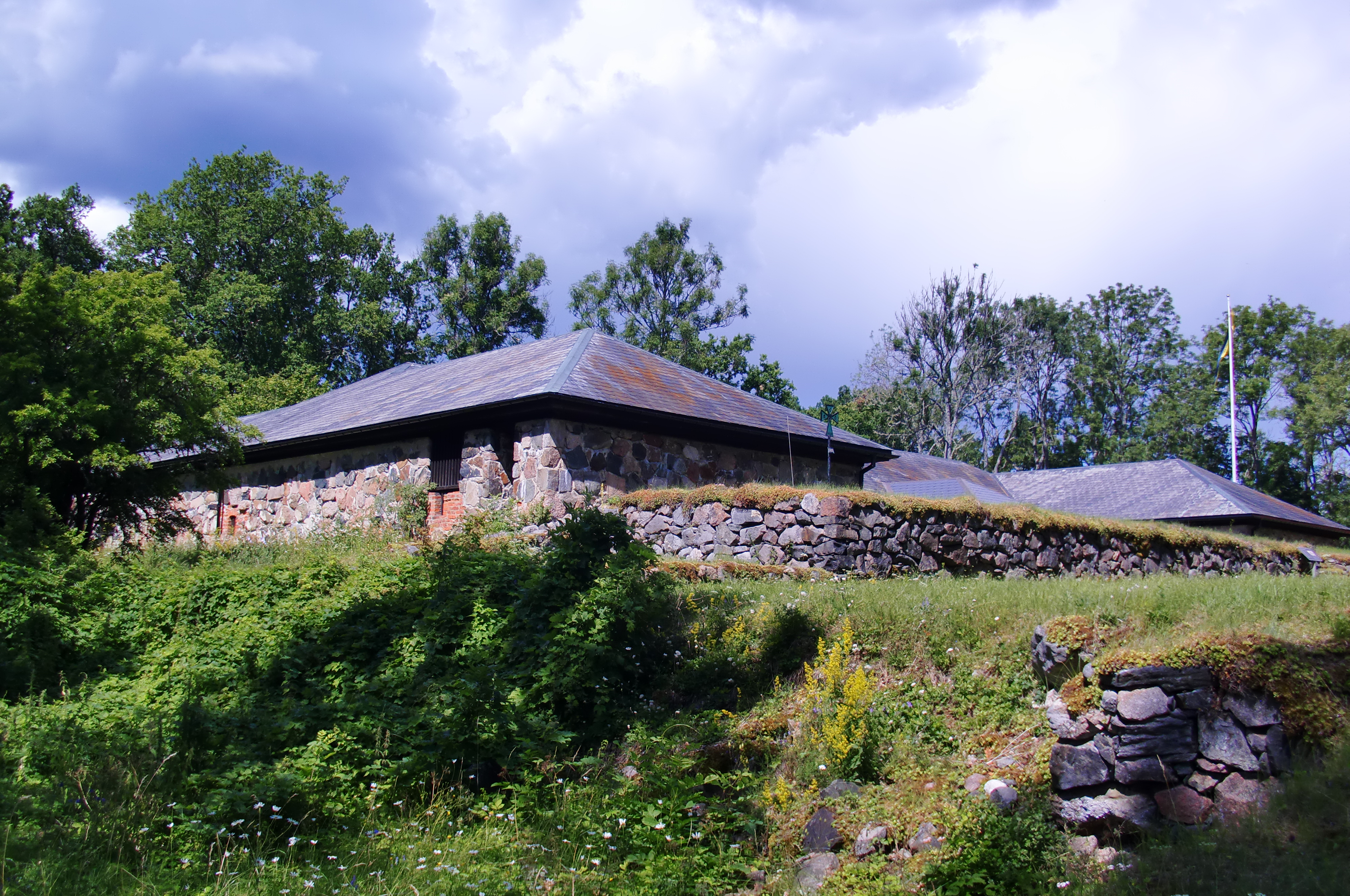

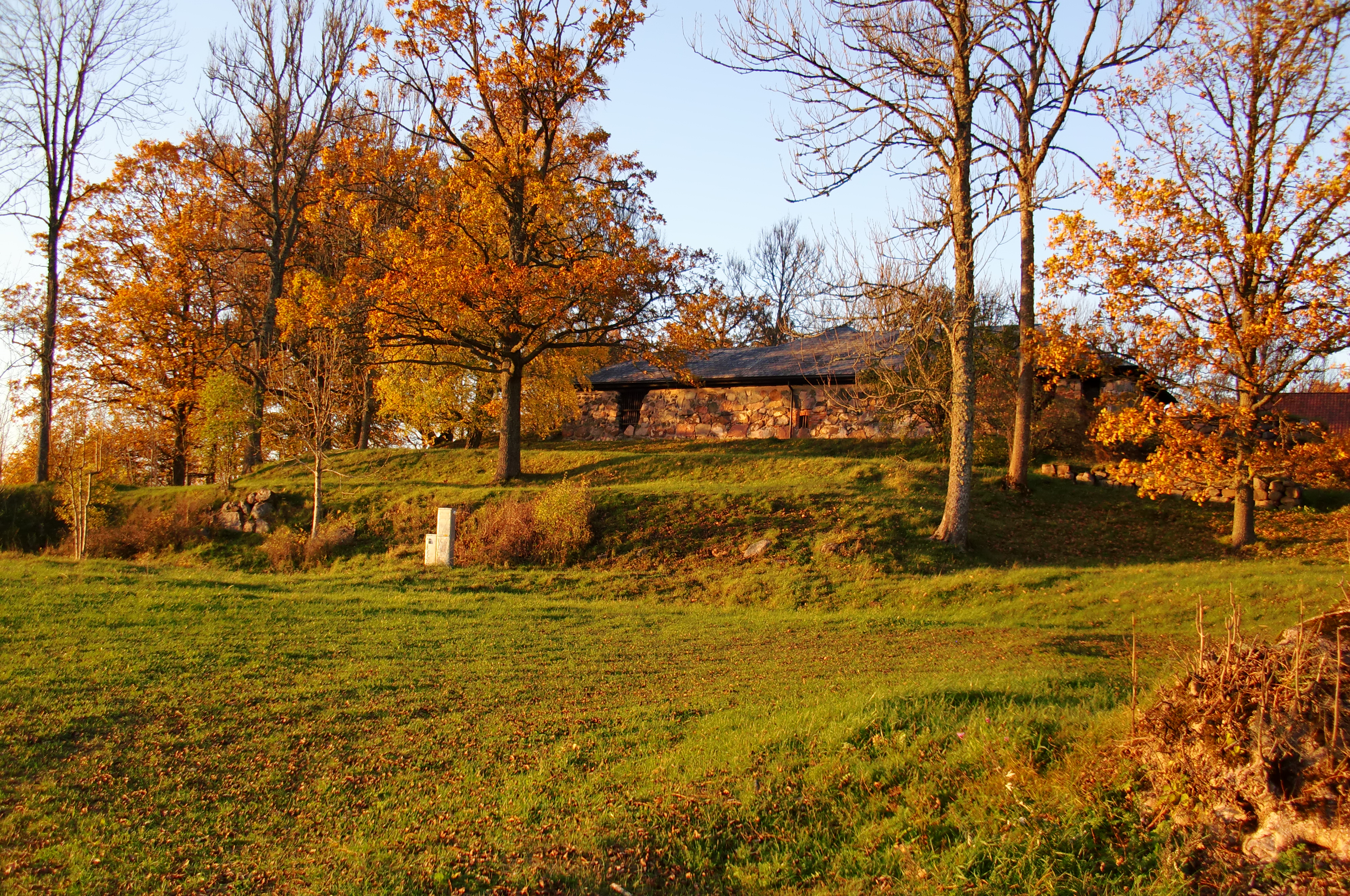
