= Strömsholm =

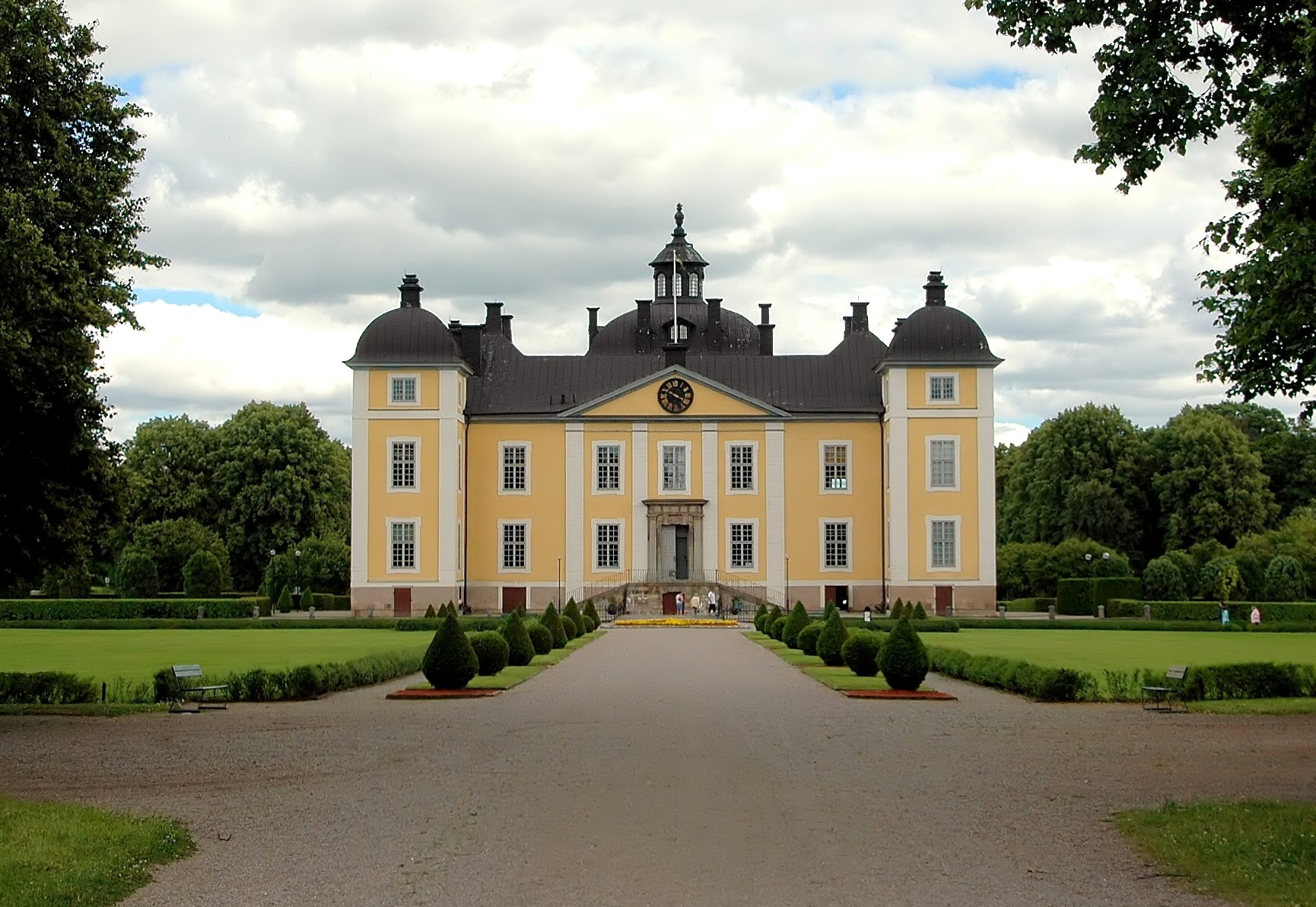
- Strömsholm Palace

- Location within Västmanland Location within Sweden
- Coordinates: 59°31′N 16°14′E
- Country: Sweden
- Province: Västmanland
- County: Västmanland County
- Municipality: Hallstahammar Municipality

Area
  - Total: 1.29 km^{2} (0.50 sq mi)

Population (31 December 2010)
  - Total: 664
  - Density: 515/km^{2} (1,330/sq mi)
- Time zone: UTC+1 (CET)
  - Summer (DST): UTC+2 (CEST)

Strömsholm (Swedish pronunciation: [strœmsˈhɔlm]) is a locality situated, in the vicinity of Herrskogen, in Hallstahammar Municipality, Västmanland County, Sweden with 664 inhabitants in 2010.

In Strömsholm is Strömsholm Palace, and from 1621 Strömsholm was a center of military horse training to supply the Swedish Army with horses. Since 1968 Strömsholm is home of civil horse training only. Strömsholm Canal starts in Strömsholm.
