= Medinge =

Area in Sweden

Coordinates: 59.43298°N 15.43021°E

Medinge is a rural area about two and a half hours' drive west of Stockholm, Sweden, in Arboga Municipality.
