= Kägleholm =

Island in the country of Sweden

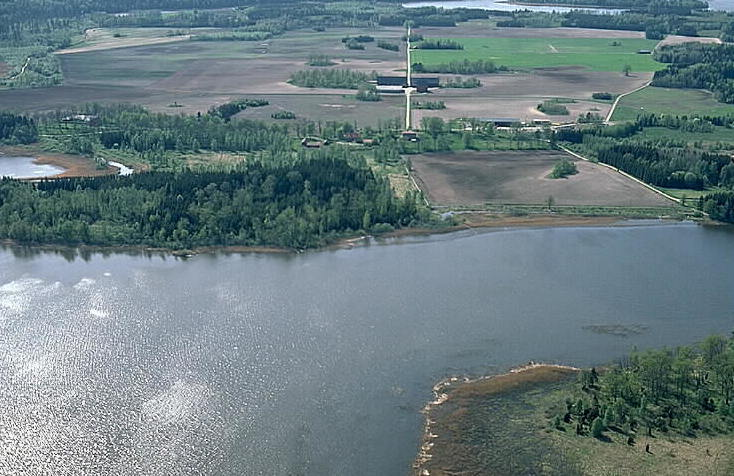

- Location in Sweden

Geography
- Location: Väringen
- Coordinates: 59.411°N 15.402°E

Administration
- Sweden

Kägleholm is an island in Lake Väringen, Örebro County, Sweden, north of the city of Örebro. The island of Kägleholm is renowned as the former location of the Kägleholm Castle, which burnt down in 1712.
