= Ramnäs =

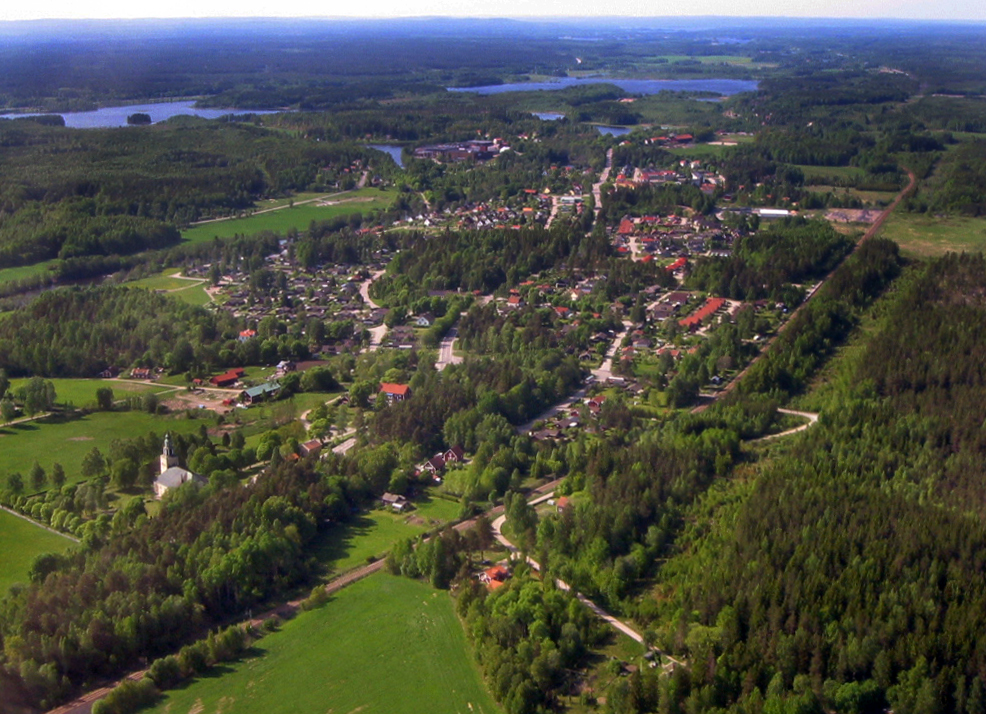

- Location within Västmanland Location within Sweden
- Coordinates: 59°46′N 16°12′E
- Country: Sweden
- Province: Västmanland
- County: Västmanland County
- Municipality: Surahammar Municipality

Area
  - Total: 2.14 km^{2} (0.83 sq mi)

Population (31 December 2010)
  - Total: 1,465
  - Density: 686/km^{2} (1,780/sq mi)
- Time zone: UTC+1 (CET)
  - Summer (DST): UTC+2 (CEST)

Ramnäs (Swedish pronunciation: [ˈrâmːnɛːs]) is a locality situated in Surahammar Municipality, Västmanland County, Sweden with 1,465 inhabitants in 2010.

In 2014, the area around Ramnas saw the largest forest fire in Sweden in modern times.

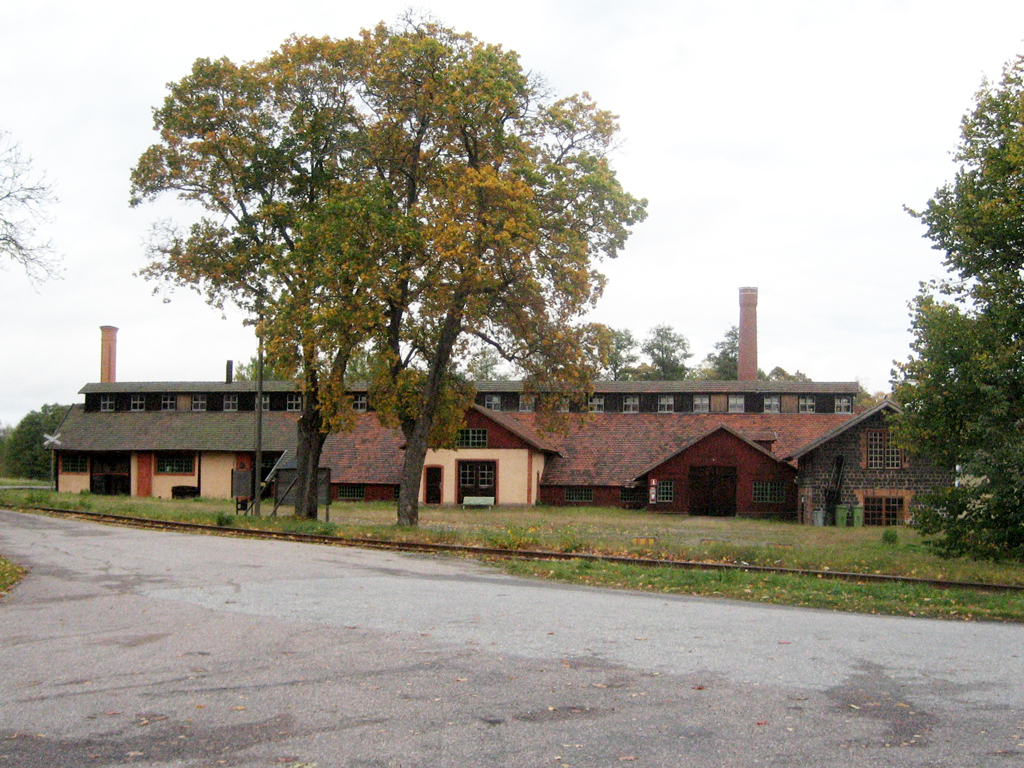
Lancashiresmedjan, a forge in Ramnäs
