= Johan Wilhelm Dalman =

Swedish physician and a naturalist (1787–1828)

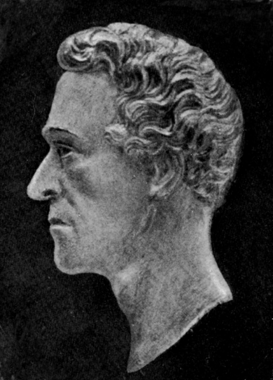
Johan Wilhelm Dalman

Johan Wilhelm Dalman (November 4, 1787, in Hinseberg, Västmanland – July 11, 1828, in Stockholm) was a Swedish physician and a naturalist. He first studied at Christiansfeld in Schleswig-Holstein then at the University of Lund and the University of Uppsala. He was mainly interested in entomology and botany. He received his degree in 1816 then his doctorate in 1817 from the University of Uppsala. Dalman became librarian of the Royal Swedish Academy of Sciences, a member of the Academy in 1821, then director of the zoological garden, then demonstrator in botany at the Karolinska Institutet of Stockholm.

Dalman's main interest lay in entomology and botany, but he also became involved in the systematics and taxonomy of trilobites. In 1771 Johann Ernst Immanuel Walch (1725-1778) first used the term trilobite. Researchers had tried to link trilobites to extant groups such as chitons and various arthropods. Before Walch’s work this had led to great confusion. By 1820 the term “trilobite” was widely used, except by Dalman who suggested the term “palaeades”. Dalman had drawn attention to the weakly defined axial furrows in the Ordovician trilobite Nileus. The trilobite genus Dalmanites in the order Phacopida was named in his honour. Dalmanites was widespread during the Ordovician and Silurian.

He was the author of De narcoticis observations (1816), Förteckning paa Skrifter i medicinska vetenskaperna, samt i kemi och Naturalhistorie, utgifne i Sverige åren 1817, 1818 and 1819 (1820), Om Palaeaderna, eller de så kallade Trilobiterna (1827) and very many works on entomology.

Entomology 1821-1825

- 1818, Några nya Genera och Species af Insecter beskrifna. Kungliga Svenska Vetenskapsakademiens Handlingar 39:69-89
- Försök till Uppställning af Insect-familjen Pteromalini, i synnerhet med afseen de på de i Sverige funne Arter. Kungliga Svenska Vetenskapsakademiens Handlingar 41(1):123-174, 177-182, tab VII-VIII
- 1820, Försök till Uppställning af Insect-familjen Pteromalini, i synnerhet med afseen de på de i Sverige funne Arter. (Fortsättning) Kungliga Svenska Vetenskapsakademiens Handlingar 41(2):340-385
- 1822, Fortsättning af Svenska Pteromalinernes beskrifning. Kungliga Svenska Vetenskapsakademiens Handlingar 43:394-403
- 1823, Analeceta Entomologica :viii+108pp, 4 pls Stockholm
- 1825, Om några Svenska arter af Coccus, samt de inuti dem förekommande parasit Insekter. Kungliga Svenska Vetenskapsakademiens Handlingar 46:350-374
