= Strömsholm Canal =

Canal in Sweden

Coordinates: 59°32′N 16°16′E

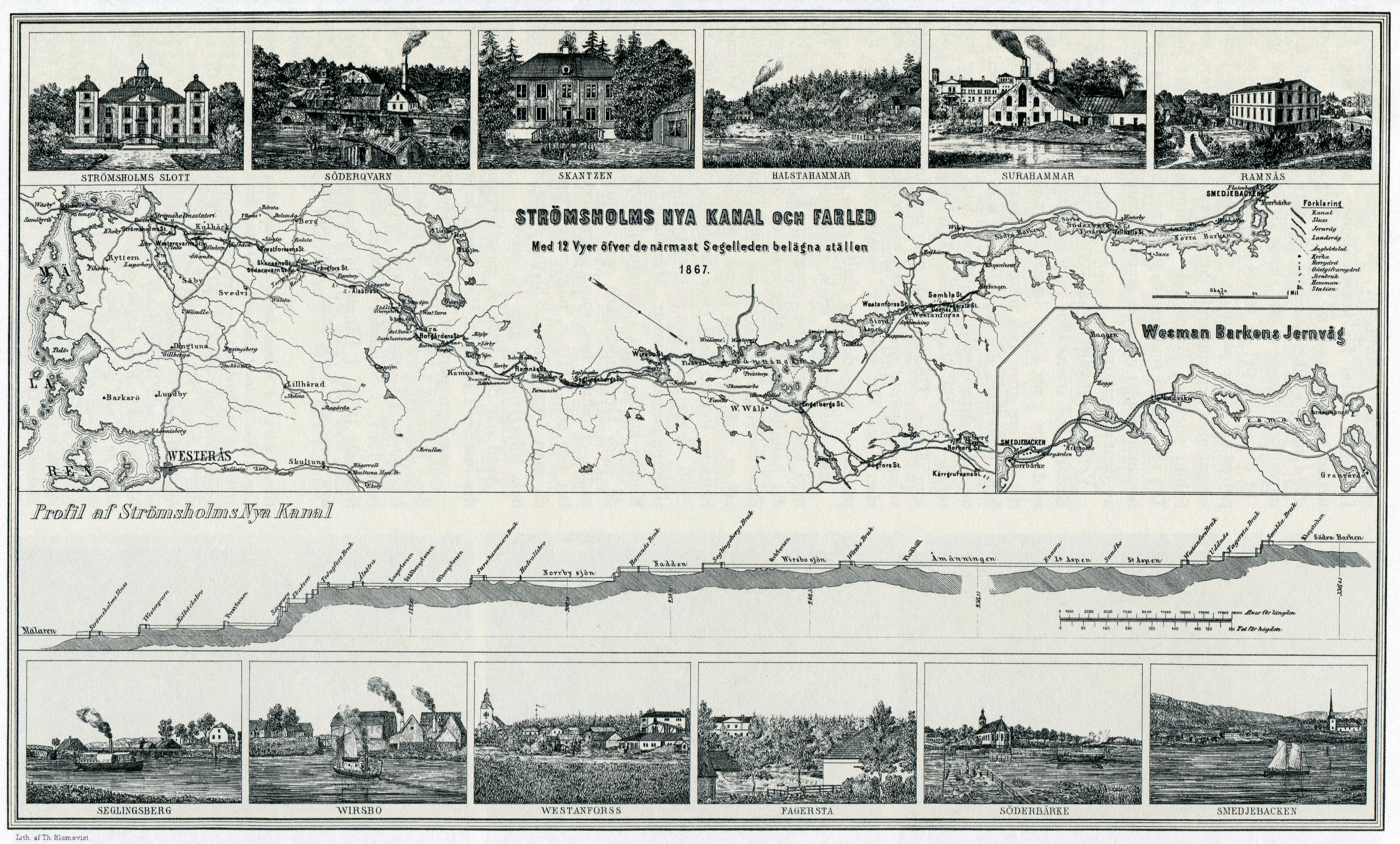
Map from 1867.

The Strömsholm Canal (Swedish: Strömsholms kanal) runs from Smedjebacken to Lake Mälaren near Strömsholm. It is 62 miles (100 km) long with 26 locks, and consists of a string of lakes connected by short manmade cuts.

The canal took 18 years to build, between 1772 and 1795, to plans laid out by Johan Ullström. The main reason for it was the transport of iron produced by the many steelworks sited along the length of the waterway. The opening of the Stockholm Wästerås-Bergslagen railway marked the beginning of its decline and today the restored canal is only used by pleasure craft.

== Gallery ==
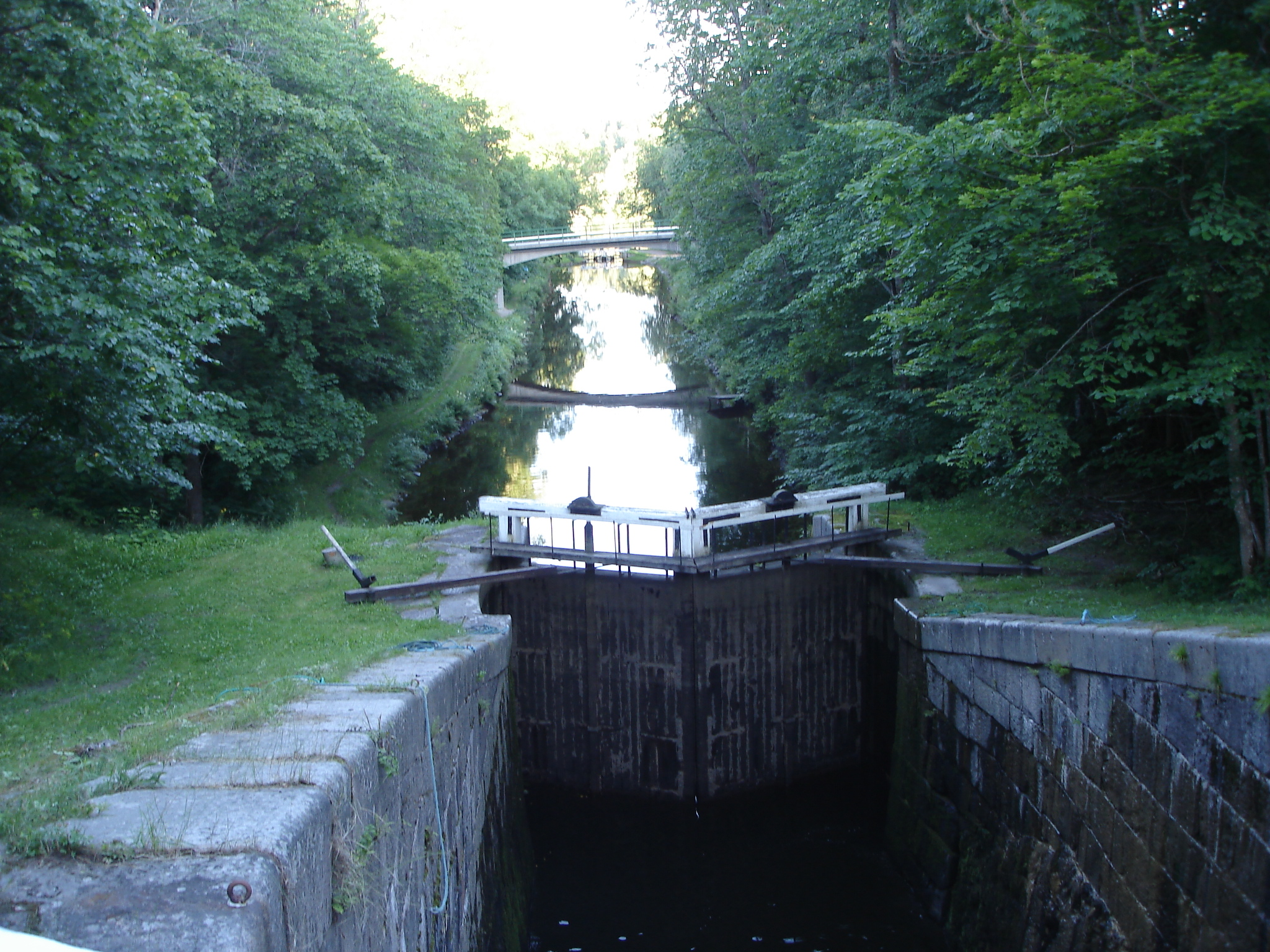
Lock Konung Gustav III

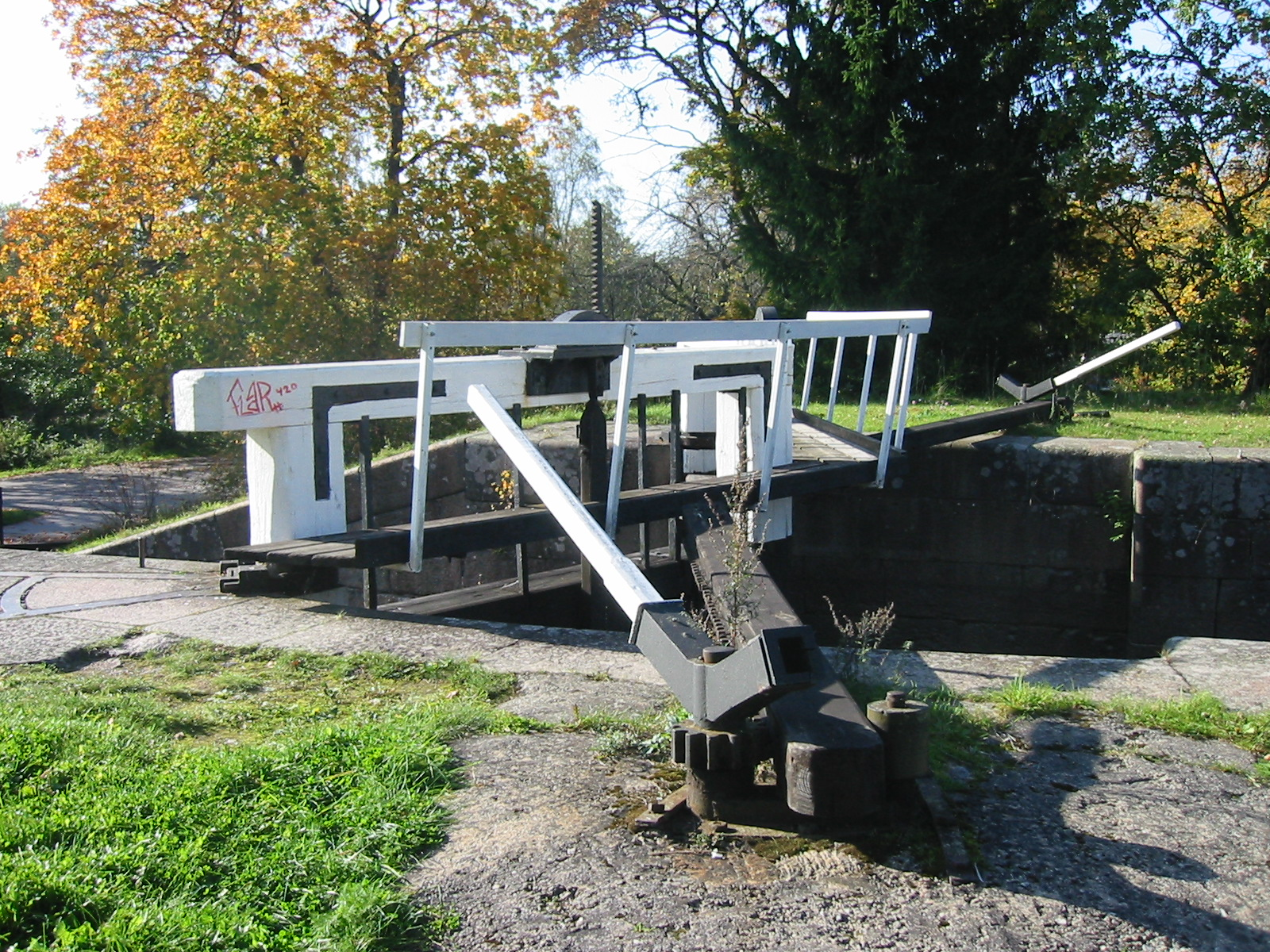
Lock Landshövding af Ugglas

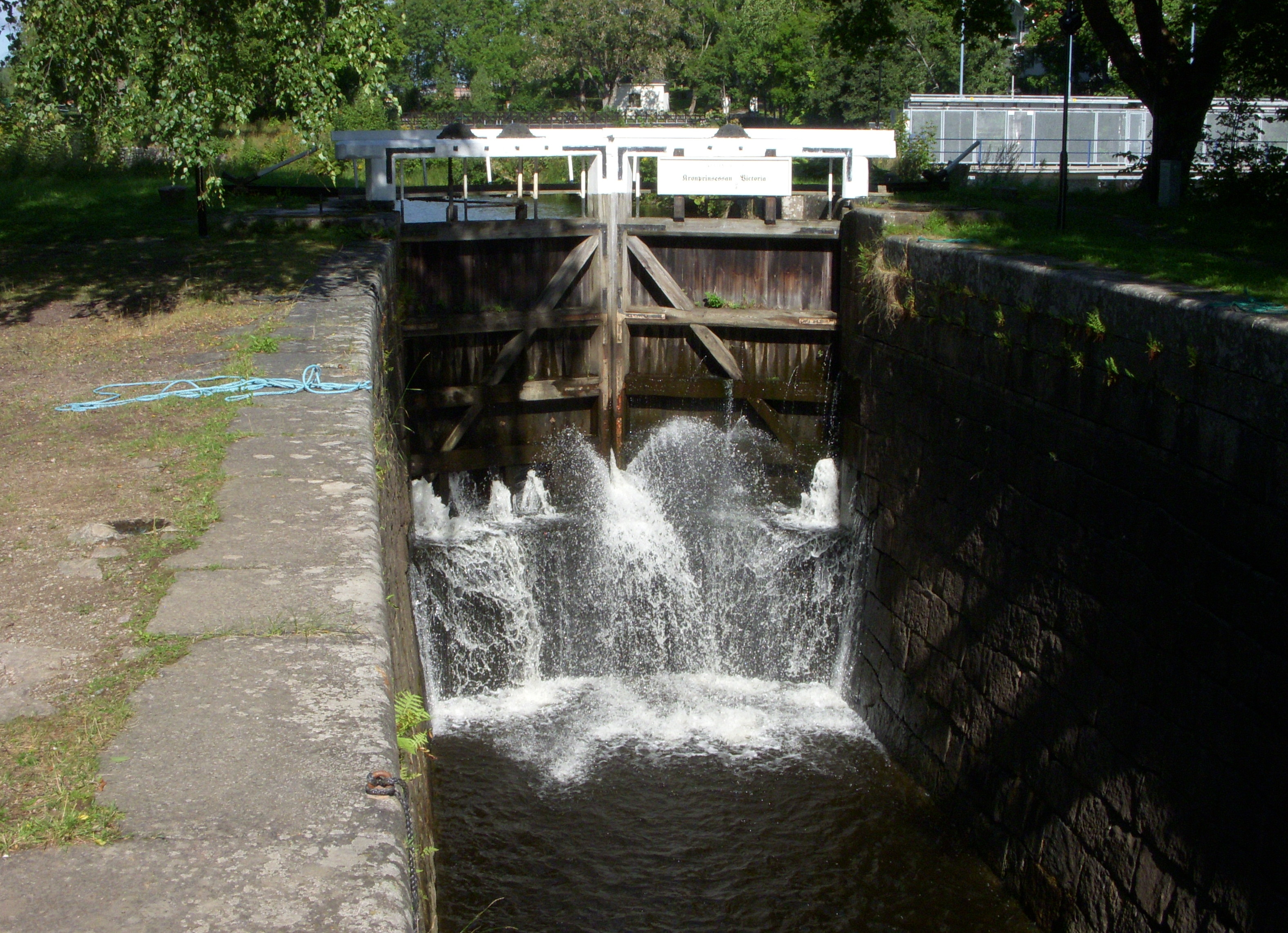
Lock Kronprinsessan Victoria

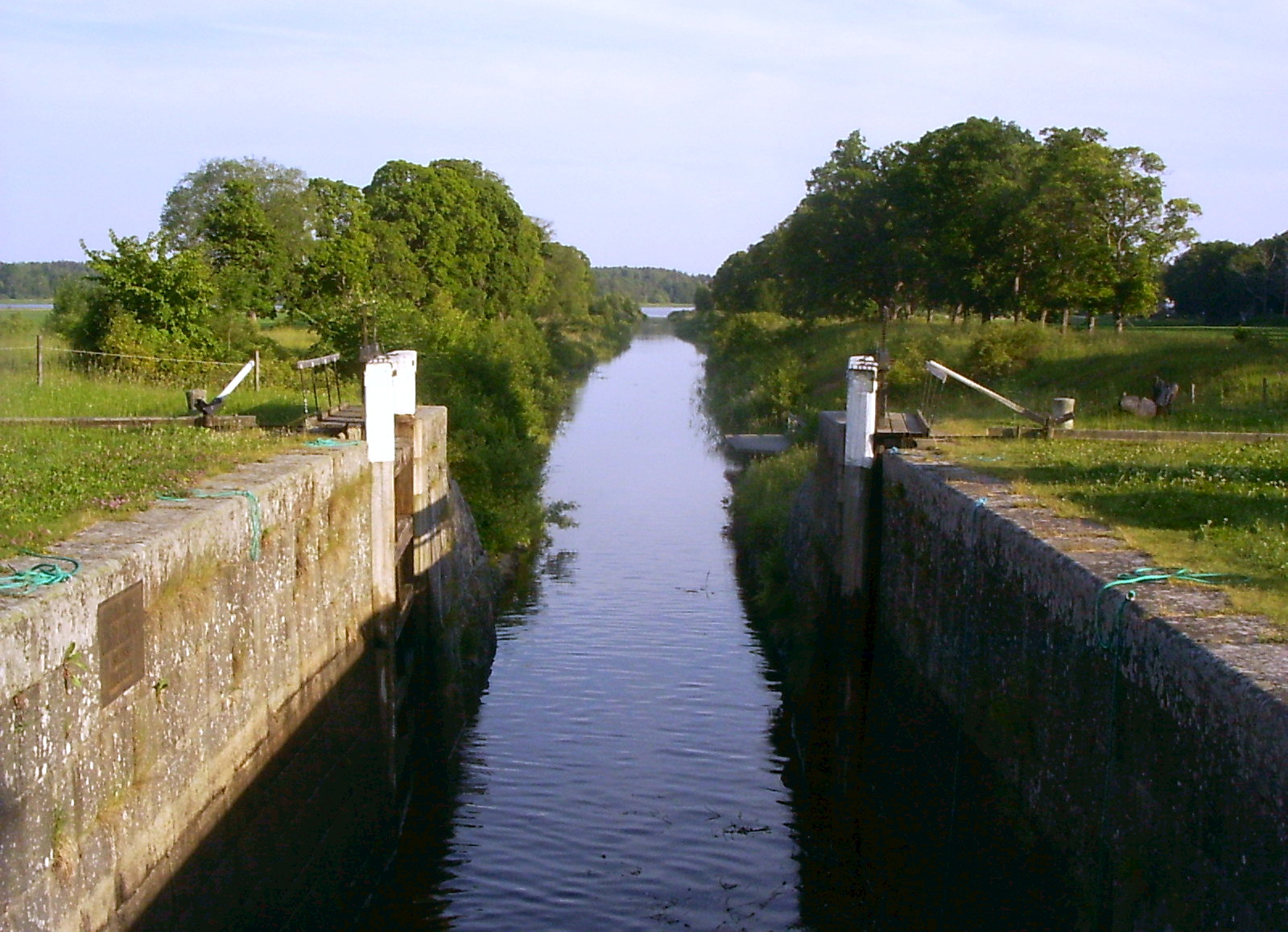
Lock Konung Karl XV

== Bibliography ==
- McKnight, Hugh, The Guinness Guide to Waterways of Western Europe, Guinness (1978)
