= 1651 in Sweden =

- Years in Sweden: 1648 1649 1650 1651 1652 1653 1654
- Centuries: 16th century · 17th century · 18th century
- Decades: 1620s 1630s 1640s 1650s 1660s 1670s 1680s
- Years: 1648 1649 1650 1651 1652 1653 1654

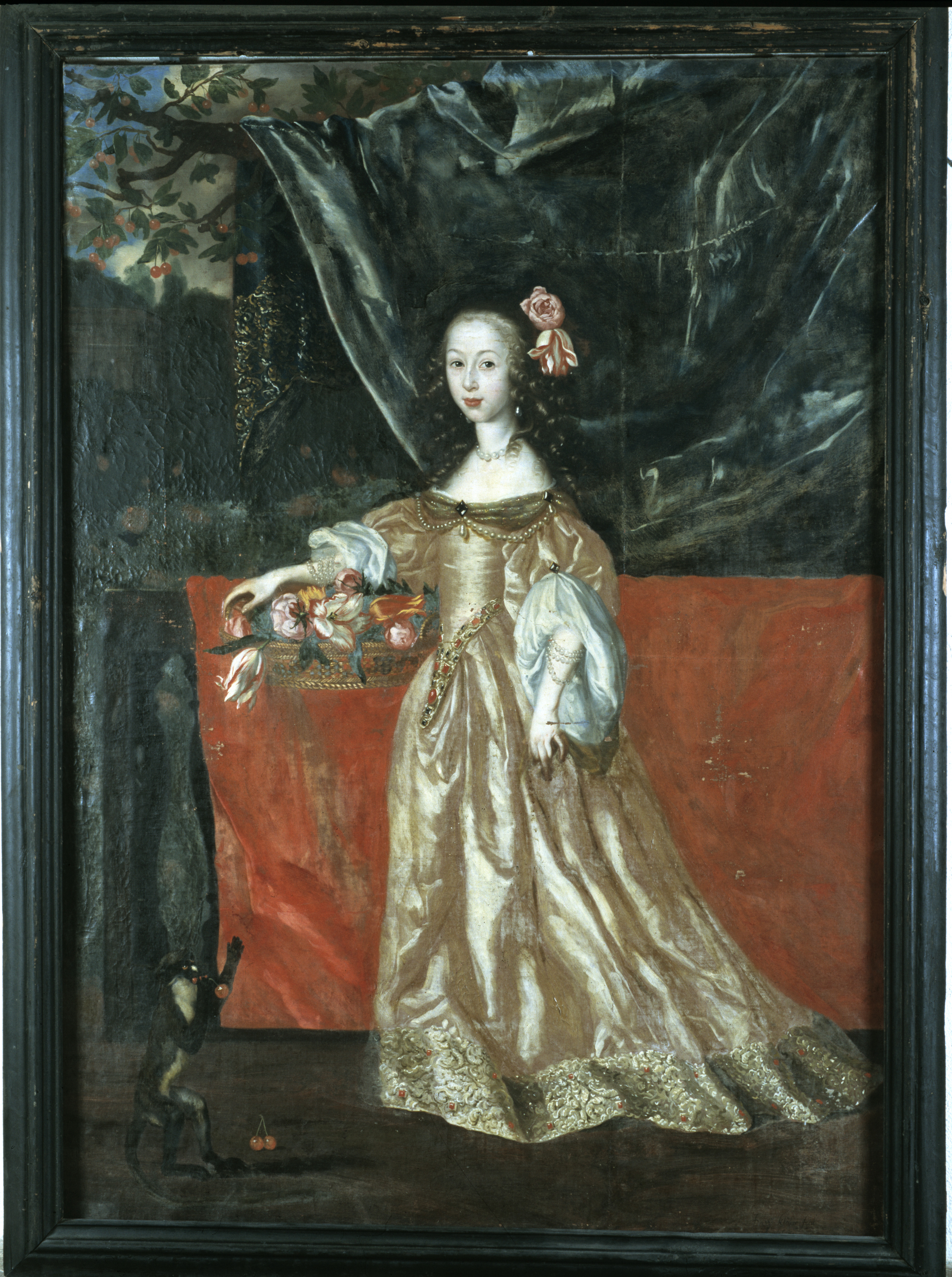

Events from the year 1651 in Sweden

== Incumbents ==
- Monarch – Christina

== Events ==
- Queen Christina declared her wish to abdicate in favor of her cousin, but is convinced not to.
- National Board of Trade (Sweden) is founded
- National law of hotels states that all hotels must have at least three bedrooms excluding that of the proprietor.
- The Queen's favorite Magnus Gabriel De la Gardie loses favor with the monarch.

== Births ==
- Carl Gustav Rehnskiöld, field marshal (died 1722)

== Deaths ==
- 7 April - Lennart Torstensson, field marshal (born 1603)
- Arnold Johan Messenius, historian (born 1607)
