= 1650 in Sweden =

- Years in Sweden: 1647 1648 1649 1650 1651 1652 1653
- Centuries: 16th century · 17th century · 18th century
- Decades: 1620s 1630s 1640s 1650s 1660s 1670s 1680s
- Years: 1647 1648 1649 1650 1651 1652 1653

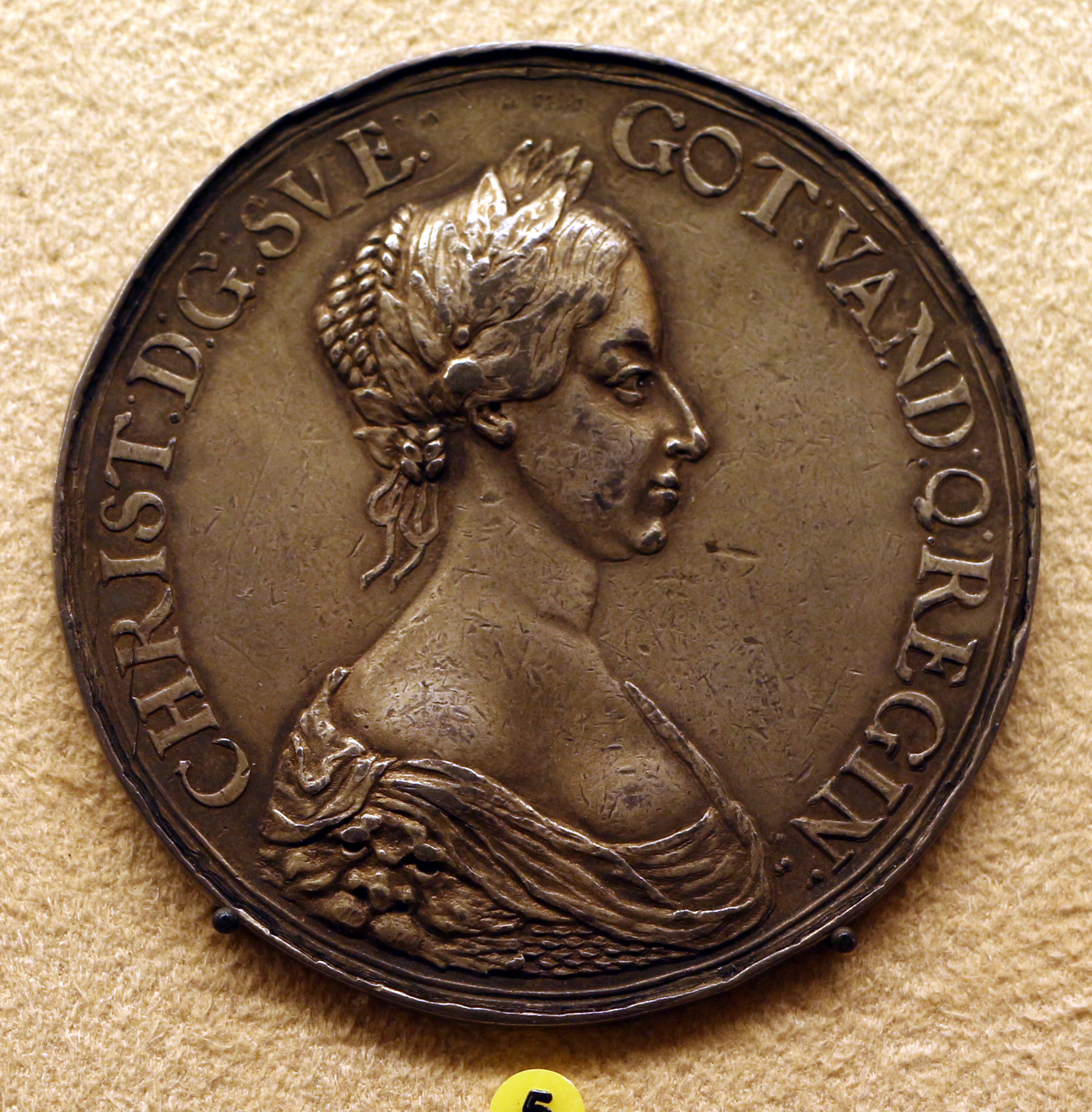

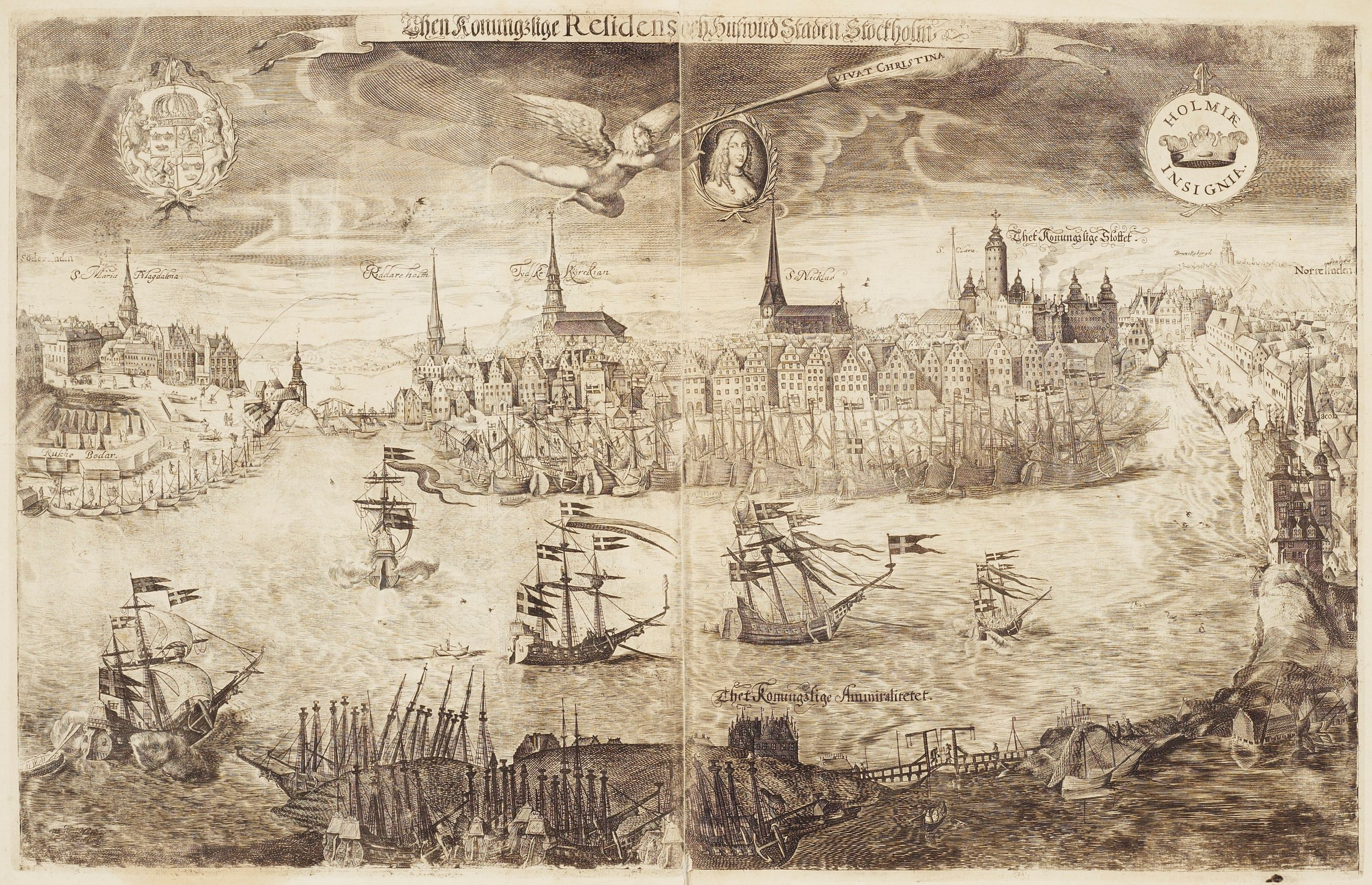

Events from the year 1650 in Sweden

== Incumbents ==
- Monarch – Christina

== Events ==
- - Coronation of Queen Christina.
- - The harvests fail over all Sweden.
- - The Swedish crown is made hereditary among the male descendants of Palatine Count Karl Gustav.
- Swedish copper mining breaks a record with 3,000 tonnes.

== Births ==
- Unknown date - Eva Margareta Frölich, mystic, prophet, visionary and Pietistic writer (died 1692)
- Lars Ulstadius, Lutheran minister and a schoolteacher (died 1732)

== Deaths ==
- 11 February – René Descartes, French philosopher (born 1596 in France)
- Carl Gyllenhielm, soldier and politician (born 1574)
