= 1724 in Sweden =

- Years in Sweden: 1721 1722 1723 1724 1725 1726 1727
- Centuries: 17th century · 18th century · 19th century
- Decades: 1690s 1700s 1710s 1720s 1730s 1740s 1750s
- Years: 1721 1722 1723 1724 1725 1726 1727

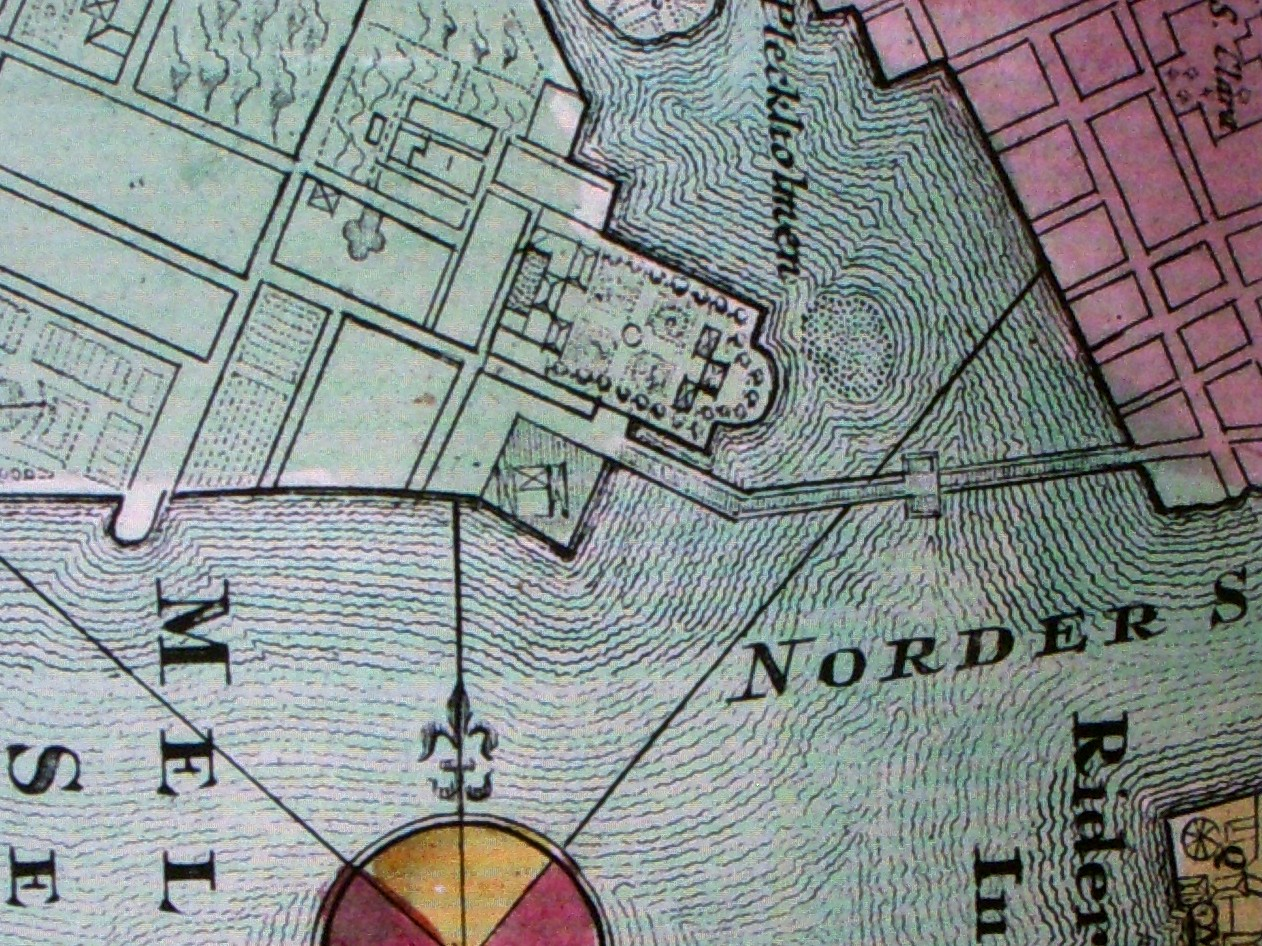
Kungsholmen östra del 1724

Events from the year 1724 in Sweden

== Incumbents ==
- Monarch – Frederick I

== Events ==
- - Defense treaty between Sweden and Russia.
- - The Product Act ban all foreign ships to import products from any other nations than their own.
- - New law on schooling: all parents are obliged to learn their children read and write, or have teachers to do so. This law is in effect until 1807.

== Births ==
- 16 January - Per Krafft the Elder, portraitist (died 1793)
- 10 July - Eva Ekeblad, scientist (died 1786)
- - Ulrika Strömfelt, politically active courtier (died 1780)

== Deaths ==
- 20 September - David von Krafft, painter (born 1655)
- - Urban Hjärne, chemist (born 1641)
- - Beata Sparre, politically active courtier (born 1662)
