= 1654 in Sweden =

- Years in Sweden: 1651 1652 1653 1654 1655 1656 1657
- Centuries: 16th century · 17th century · 18th century
- Decades: 1620s 1630s 1640s 1650s 1660s 1670s 1680s
- Years: 1651 1652 1653 1654 1655 1656 1657

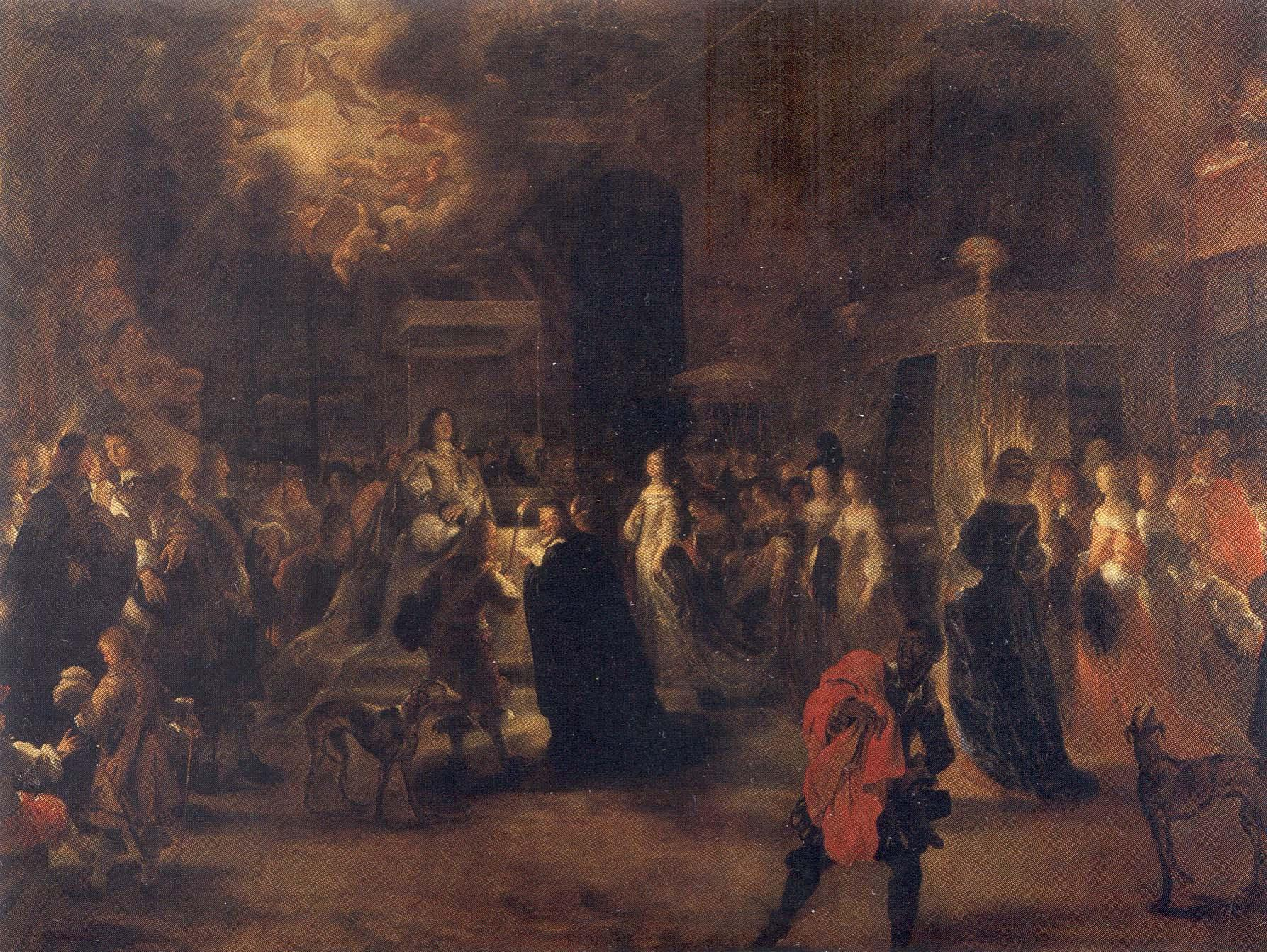
Consummation ceremony after the wedding of King Charles X Gustav and Queen Hedwig Eleanor in 1654.

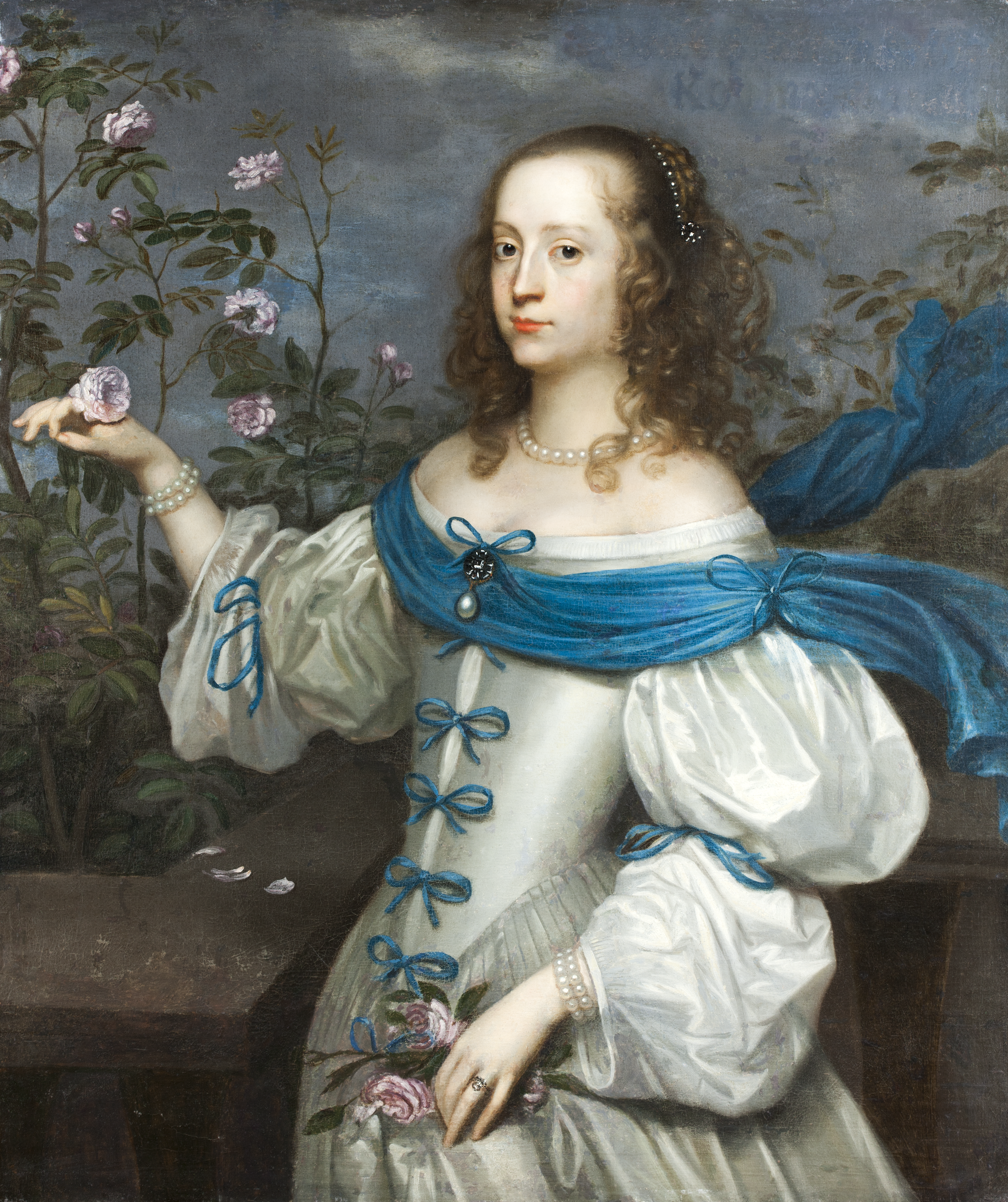

Events from the year 1654 in Sweden.

== Incumbents ==
- Monarch - Christina then Charles X Gustav

== Events ==
- April - The 1654 Anglo-Swedish alliance is forged to offset the Danish-Dutch alliance.
- 6 June - Charles X Gustav succeeds his cousin Christina on the Swedish throne. After her abdication on the same day, Christina, now the former reigning queen of a Protestant nation, secretly converts to Catholicism.
- 24 October - The wedding between Charles X Gustav and Hedwig Eleonora of Holstein-Gottorp.

== Births ==
- 23 May - Nicodemus Tessin the Younger, architect (died 1728)
- 6 October - Johan Peringskiöld, antiquarian (died 1720)
- Anna Lohe, banker (died 1731)

== Deaths ==
- 25 January - Ebba Mauritzdotter Leijonhufvud, courtier (born 1595)
- 28 August - Axel Oxenstierna, politician (born 1583)
- Louise van der Nooth, courtier (born 1630s)
