= 1588 in Sweden =

Events from the year 1588 in Sweden

== Incumbent ==
John III of Sweden

== Events ==
The Bubonic plague reaches Stockholm.

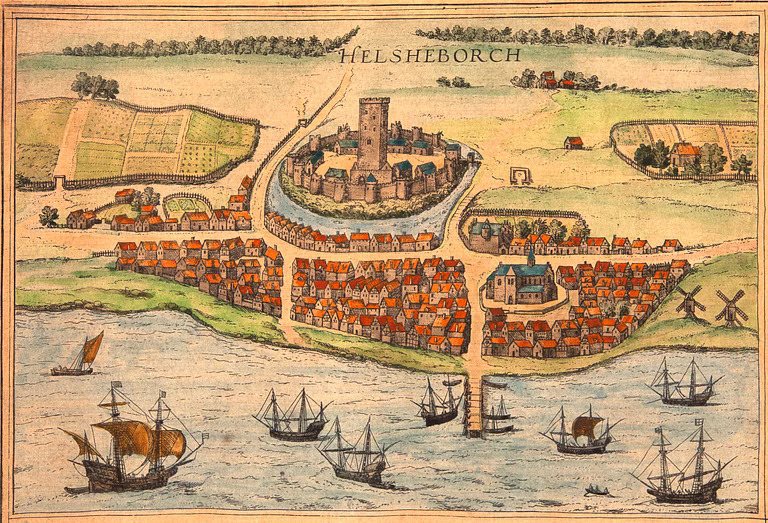
Helsingborg 1588

Stockholm Castle receives the name "Tre Kronor" (Three Crowns) after three gilded crowns were placed on top of the central spire.

== Births ==
- 28 June - Per Gustafsson Banér, noblemen and member of the Privy Council of Sweden. (died.1644)
- Unknown - Lars Eriksson Stormhatt, officer during The Ingrian War, ennobled 1646. (died. 1667)
- 24 August - Laurentius Olai Wallius, Rector of Uppsala University, bishop and court chaplin for the Queen Dowager. (died. 1637)
- 6 September - Johan von Ridderhusen, Swedish civil servant for the Royal Chancellery and the first secretary of the House of Nobility. (died. 1648)

== Deaths ==
Ebba Axelsdotter af Bielke - Swedish noblewomen who died in childbirth
