= 1619 in Sweden =

Events from the year 1619 in Sweden

== Incumbents ==
- Monarch – Gustaf II Adolf

== Events ==
- The Älvsborg Ransom (1613) is finally paid in full to the Danes, and Älvsborg is returned to Sweden.

== Births ==
- Gustaf Adolf Lewenhaupt, soldier and politician (died 1659)
