= 1616 in Sweden =

Events from the year 1616 in Sweden

== Incumbents ==
- Monarch – Gustaf II Adolf

== Events ==
- - Armistice between Sweden and Russia.
- - Johannes Messenius is imprisoned for treason.
- Sweden returns a large section of their country to Russia

== Births ==
- - Gustaf Gustafsson af Wasaborg, illegitimate son of the monarch (died 1653)
- - Christina Magdalena of the Palatinate-Zweibrücken, princess (died 1662)
