= 1715 in Sweden =

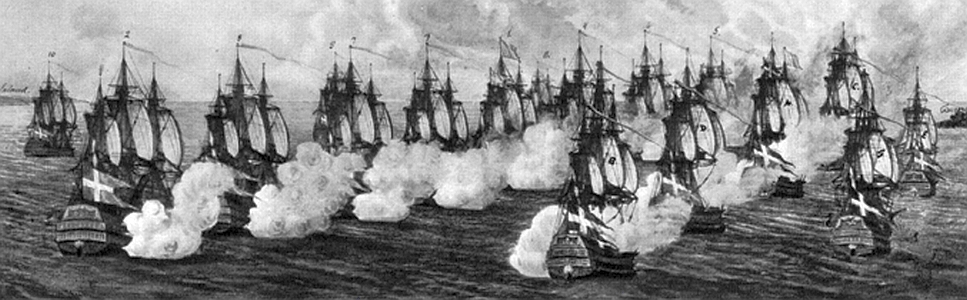
Battle of Fehmarn, 1715

Events from the year 1715 in Sweden

== Incumbents ==
- Monarch – Charles XII

== Events ==
- 24 March - The wedding between Princess Ulrika Eleonora and Frederick of Hesse.
- 12 April - Danish frigate Ørnen (1694) is captured by Swedish Captain Printz
- 24 April - Battle of Fehmarn (1715)
- 28 April - Treaty of Stettin (1715)
- 18 August - Battle of Rügen (1715)
- - Hanover declares war on Sweden.
- - Charles XII leaves Stralsund.
- - Stralsund taken by Denmark and Prussia.
- - Charles XII arrives in Scania.
- - Lars Gathenhielm is ennobled.
- - Solar eclipse over Sweden.
- 15 November - Battle of Stresow

== Births ==
- 23 April - Carl Tersmeden, diarist (died 1797)
- - Carl Fredrik Scheffer, privy councillor and writer (died 1786)
- 1715 – Asmund Palm, Swedish consul and merchant (d. 1780)

== Deaths ==
- 24 November - Queen Dowager Hedwig Eleonora, queen dowager (born 1636)
