= 1793 in Sweden =

- Years in Sweden: 1790 1791 1792 1793 1794 1795 1796
- Centuries: 17th century · 18th century · 19th century
- Decades: 1760s 1770s 1780s 1790s 1800s 1810s 1820s
- Years: 1790 1791 1792 1793 1794 1795 1796

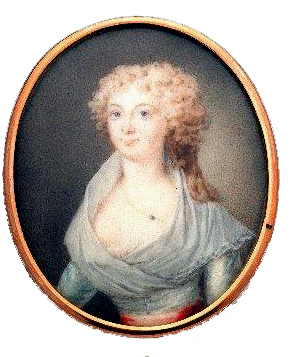
Magdalena Charlotta Rudenschöld

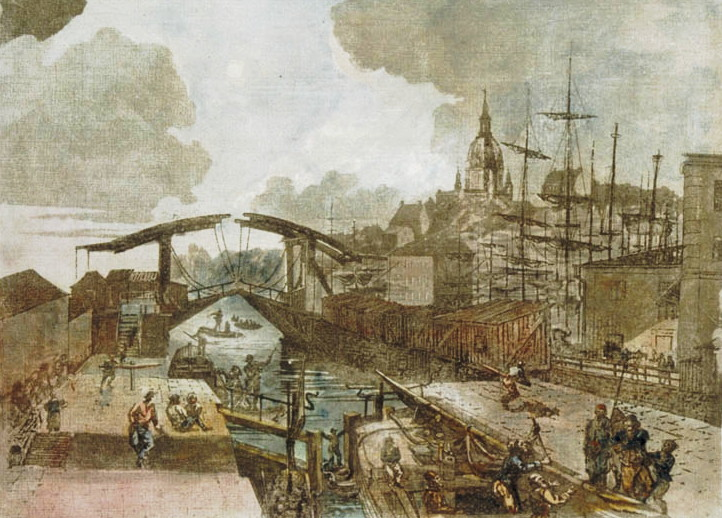

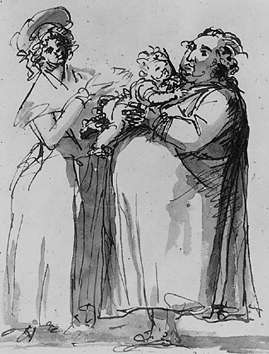

Events from the year 1793 in Sweden

== Incumbents ==
- Monarch – Gustav IV Adolf

== Events ==
- 7 January - Ebel riots in Stockholm.
- 9 March - Riot among students in Scania.
- May - Reuterholm completes a defense treaty with revolutionary France.
- 18 December - Magdalena Rudenschöld is the first to be arrested when the Armfelt Conspiracy of the Gustavian Party against the guardian government is exposed.
- - The Royal Dramatic Theatre changes localities from the Bollhuset to Makalös in Stockholm, and the Bollhuset building is torn down.
- - The Royal Dramatic Training Academy is regulated and given its organization by Anne Marie Milan Desguillons and Joseph Sauze Desguillons.

== Births ==
- 27 February - Elisabeth Frösslind, opera singer and actress (died 1861)
- 20 August - Ulrika Sofia De Geer, salonnière (died 1869)
- 14 October - Erik Johan Stagnelius, romantic poet (died 1823)
- 28 November - Carl Jonas Love Almqvist, romantic poet, early feminist, realist, composer, social critic and traveller (died 1866)
- 2 September - Caroline Ridderstolpe, composer (died 1878)

== Deaths ==
- 4 January - Bengt Lidner, poet (born 1757)
- 2 March – Carl Gustaf Pilo, painter (born 1711)
- 15 May - Peter Adolf Hall, painter (born 1739)
- 19 May – Jean Eric Rehn
- 5 July - Alexander Roslin, painter (born 1718)
- 10 August - Daniel Rolander, biologist and an apostle of Carl Linnaeus (born 1722)
- Maria Carowsky, painter (born 1723)
- Ingrid Maria Wenner, courtier (born 1731)
