= 1695 in Sweden =

- Years in Sweden: 1692 1693 1694 1695 1696 1697 1698
- Centuries: 16th century · 17th century · 18th century
- Decades: 1660s 1670s 1680s 1690s 1700s 1710s 1720s
- Years: 1692 1693 1694 1695 1696 1697 1698

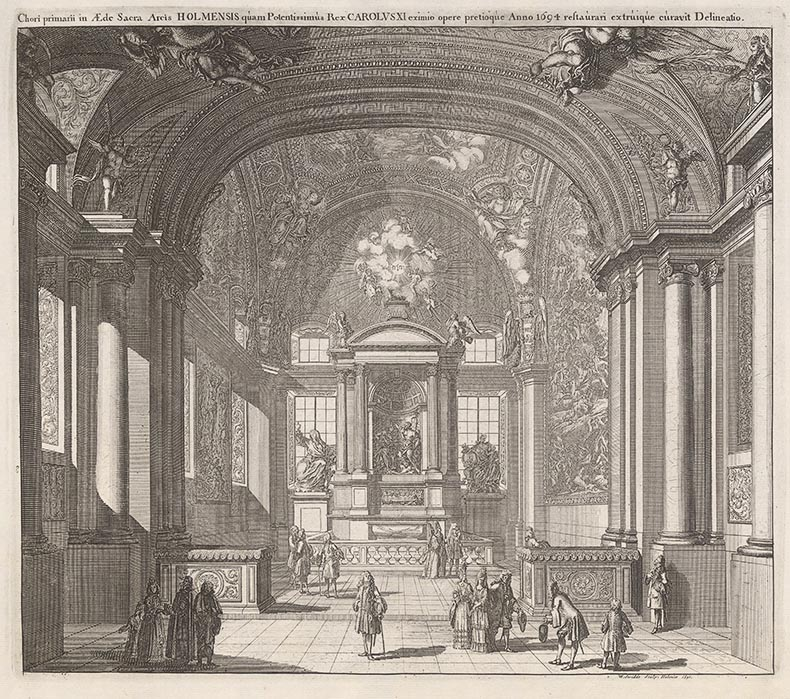
Slottskyrkan

Events from the year 1695 in Sweden

== Incumbents ==
- Monarch – Charles XI

== Events ==
- Winter - Seven years of bad harvests result in the beginning of the Great Famine, and 1695 being known as the Black Year.
- The king dissolves the tapestry school Tapetskolan vid Karlberg.

== Births ==
- - Hedvig Catharina Lillie, politically active salon hostess (died 1745)
- June 24 - Martin van Meytens, painter (died 1770)
- 17 August - Gustaf Lundberg, rococo pastelist and portrait painter (died 1786)
- 5 September - Carl Gustaf Tessin, Count and politician (died 1770)

== Deaths ==
- - Armegot Printz, colonial noblewoman (born 1625)
