= 1553 in Sweden =

Events from the year 1553 in Sweden:

1553 was an important year for Sweden as it marked the beginning of a transition under the rule of King Gustav Vasa. It was in this year that the Lapvesi peasant Revolt (1551-53) came to an end. The uprising, begun by Finnish peasants who were rebelling against very heavy taxes, in South Karelia (which was then a part of Sweden), was ended by the King, in 1553.

The King introduced a new and specialised tax in the Norrland region to fund the repair of the Sala Silver mine and at the same time the King insisted that the royal Navy be reconstructed so that the defenses against Lubeck were more effective. pages 8-9

In this same year, the Een Liten Songbook was printed. This was an important step adding credance to the development of the Swedish Reformation. This also helped establish vernacular Lutheran hymn singing in the country

The Royal navy expanded and it was also the year in which a key Royal minister and one of King Gustav Vasa's most trusted political advisors,Conrad von Pyhy the Lord High Chancellor of Sweden, died

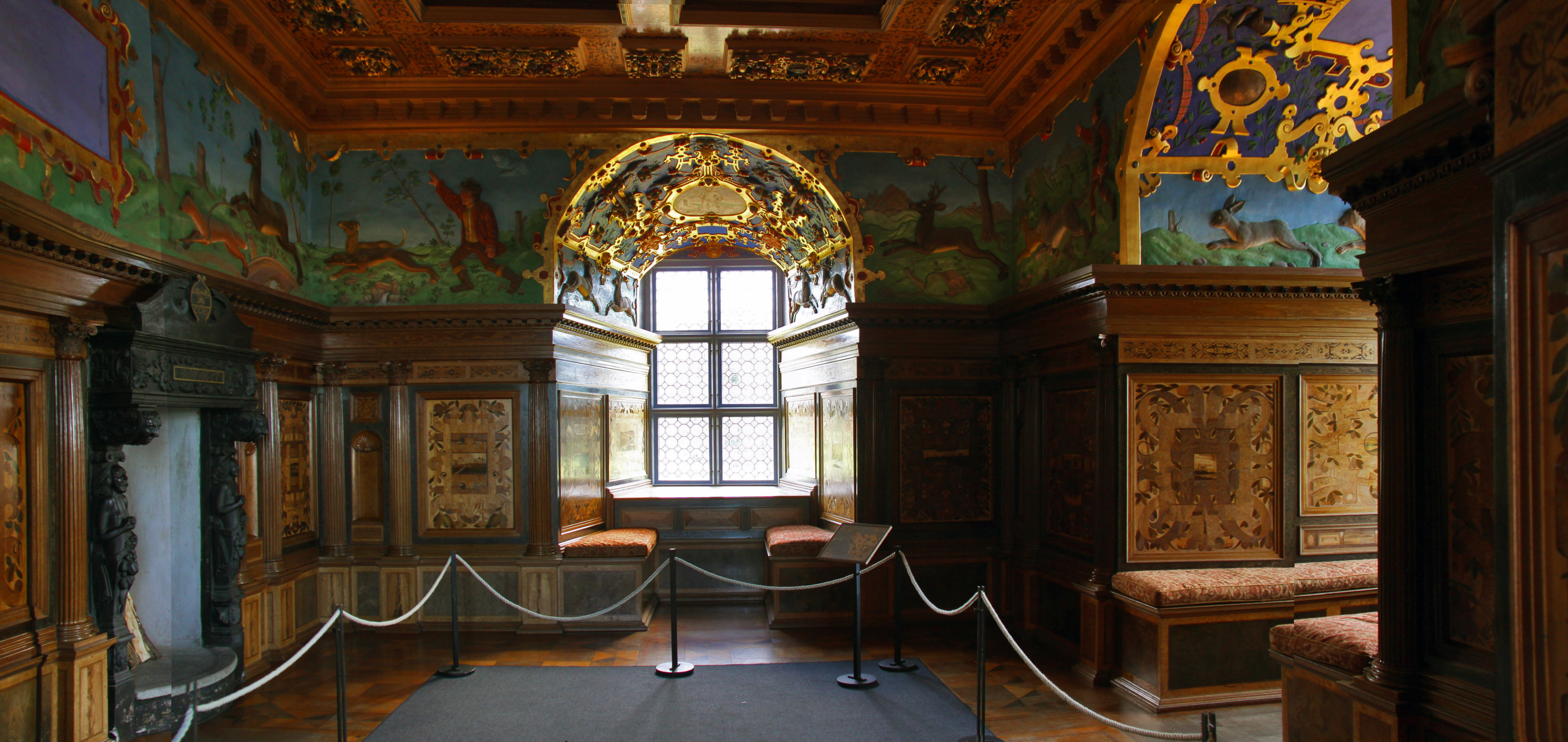

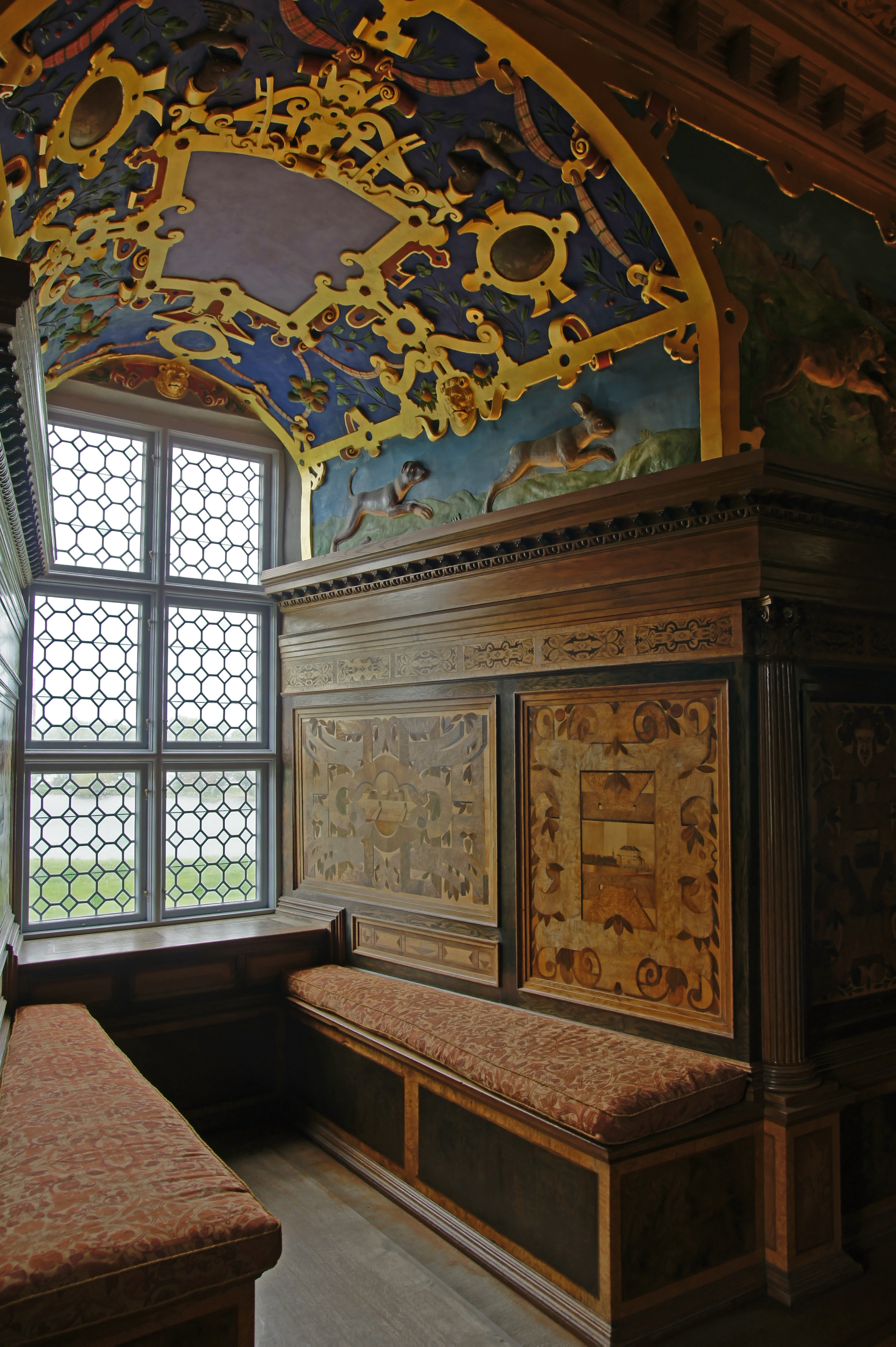

== Incumbents ==
- Monarch – Gustav I

== Events ==
07),%20OCR.pdf

- - Publication of the song book Een liten Songbook.
- - A tax is introduced in Norrland for the repair of Sala Silver Mine.
- - Decoration of the royal rooms at Kalmar Castle.
- -The King urges the increased Production of Naval Vessels to defend against Lübeck

== Deaths ==
- 7 April - Gunilla Bese, defender of Vyborg Castle (born 1475)
- - Conrad von Pyhy, Lord High Chancellor of Sweden
- - Barbro Eriksdotter (Bielke), landowner, role model of the infamous pintorpafrun
