= 1693 in Sweden =

- Years in Sweden: 1690 1691 1692 1693 1694 1695 1696
- Centuries: 16th century · 17th century · 18th century
- Decades: 1660s 1670s 1680s 1690s 1700s 1710s 1720s
- Years: 1690 1691 1692 1693 1694 1695 1696

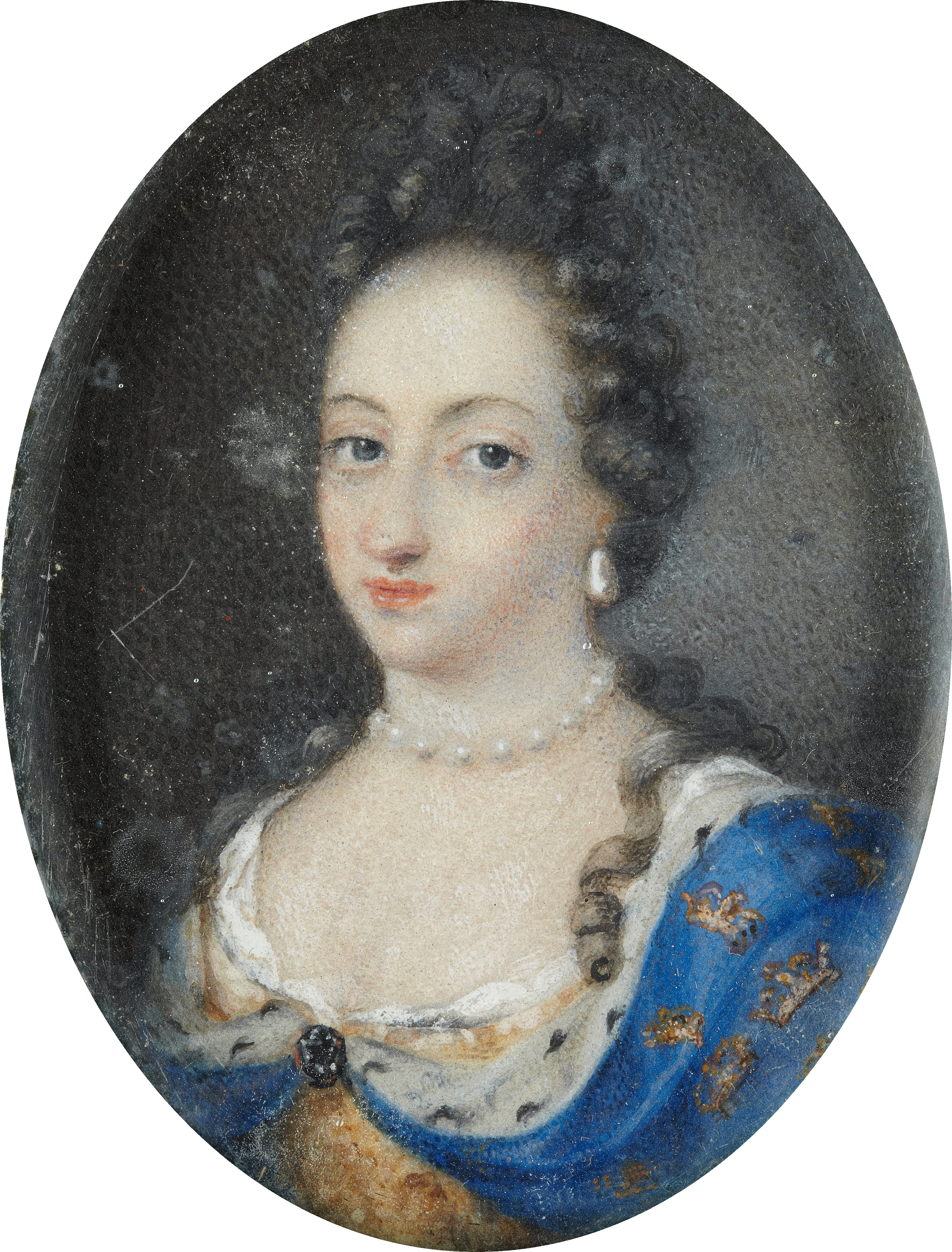
Miniature portrait of Queen Ulrika Eleonora the Elder, Queen of Sweden 1680–1693 - Google Art Project

Events from the year 1693 in Sweden

== Incumbents ==
- Monarch – Charles XI

== Events ==
- - The Riksdag of the Estates is forced to confirm that the King and the Crown Prince has been granted their power from God and are answerable to no one.
- - A new law on schooling is introduced.
- The process against Lars Nilsson (shaman), who is sentenced to death for Paganism for being a follower of the Sami religion.

== Deaths ==
- 22 February - Henrik Horn, friherre, military, field marshal (1665), admiral (1677) and member of the Privy Council of Sweden (1677) (born 1618)
- 17 April - Rutger von Ascheberg, soldier, officer and civil servant (born 1621)
- - Lars Nilsson (shaman), Sami shaman (born unknown date)
- 26 July - Ulrika Eleonora of Denmark, queen (born 1656)
- 9 October - Maria Elisabeth Stenbock, courtier
