= 1544 in Sweden =

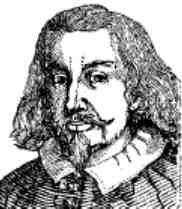
Johannes Magnus

Events from the year 1544 in Sweden

== Incumbents ==
- Monarch – Gustav I (1523 - 1560)

== Events ==
- January 13 - The Västerås arvförening declare Sweden to be a Hereditary monarchy, with the right of the eldest legitimate son to be heir to the throne and the younger sons to be Dukes. It is also officially declared a Protestant Kingdom: Requiem, the worship of saints and pilgrimages is banned, crucifixes is removed from the churches, and the opposition to the new religious order is declared heretics.
- - Olaus Magnus is appointed Catholic Arch Bishop of Sweden by the pope in his exile in Rome.
- The former nuns of the Skänninge Abbey are forcibly moved to Vreta Abbey.

== Deaths ==
- - Johannes Magnus, last Catholic archbishop (born 1488)
