= 1546 in Sweden =

Events from the year 1546 in Sweden

== Incumbents ==
- Monarch – Gustav Vasa

== Events ==
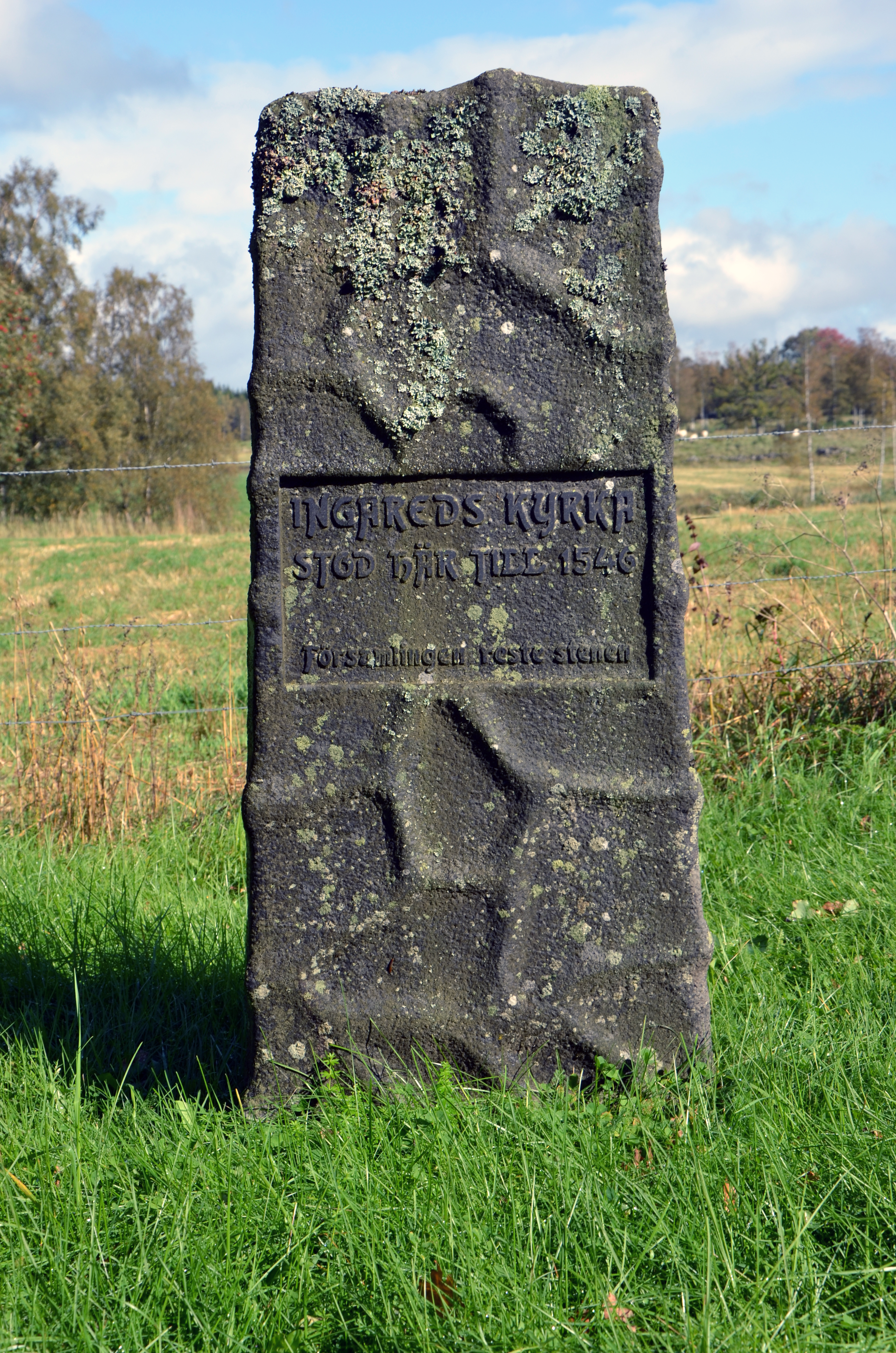
Memorial stone for the church of Ingared am Lönnern. Inscription: "Ingareds Kyrka stod här till 1546 Församlingen reste stenen"

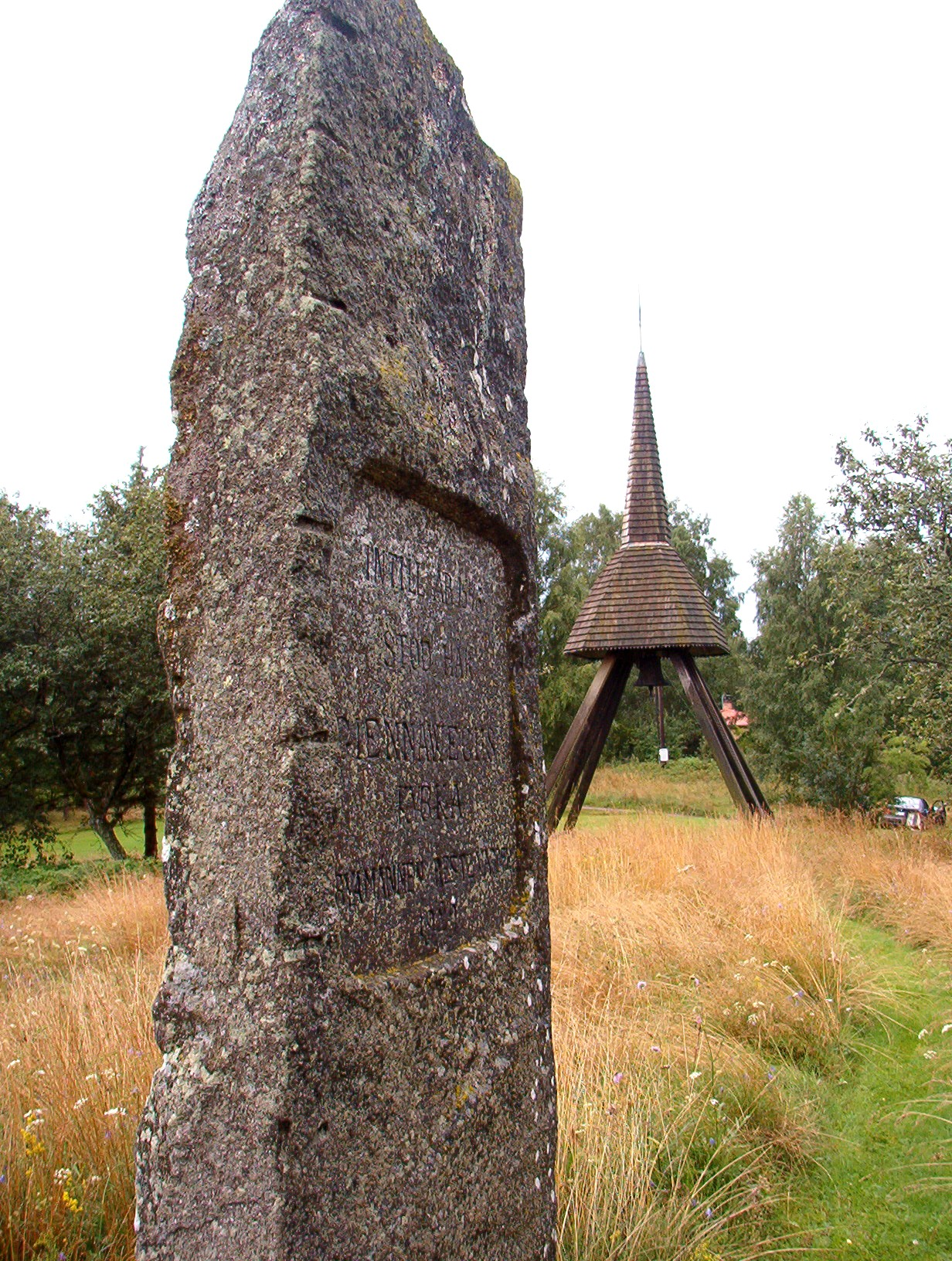
Genneved's church site in Stora Mellby parish in Bjärke, Västergötland. The church site is located in the northern part of Alingsås municipality in Västra Götaland County, Sweden.

- - The city of Linköping burns down.
- - Ekenäs is granted city privileges.
- - Ingared's church is destroyed.
- - Genneved's church site in Stora Mellby is destroyed in Bjärke, Västergötland.
