= Carl Gustaf Kröningssvärd =

Swedish historian and lawyer (1786–1859)

- Born: 19 January 1786; Västerfärnebo parish, Västerås, Kingdom of Sweden
- Died: 6 September 1859 (aged 73); Sweden
- Education: Uppsala University
- Occupations: Lawyer; historian

Carl Gustaf Kröningssvärd (1786–1859) was a Swedish lawyer and historian.

He was born on 19 January 1786 at Stavre in Västerfärnebo parish in Västerås to Major Abraham Zacharias Kröningssvärd and Elsa Magdalena Polhammar. He received his law degree in 1806 from Uppsala University and was appointed 1813 to the county clerk in Kopparberg. He died on 6 September 1859 in Sweden.
