= 1531 in Sweden =

Events from 1531 in Sweden.

== Incumbents ==
- Monarch – Gustav I

== Events ==
- - Laurentius Petri is appointed the first Lutheran Arch Bishop of Sweden.
- - Wedding between the King and Catherine of Saxe-Lauenburg.
- - Olaus Petri writes the first Lutheran church service in Sweden.
- - The third of the Dalecarlian Rebellions begins.

== Births ==
- Sten Axelsson Banér (1531–1599) – He was a Swedish nobleman and a significant military leader.

== Deaths ==
- Nils Dacke (circa 1510–1543) – Although he died in 1543, he was a significant figure during the early 1530s.
- Bengt Nilsson (Oxenstierna) (circa 1480–1531) – A prominent Swedish noble and politician
