= 1532 in Sweden =

Events from the year 1532 in Sweden

== Incumbents ==
- Monarch – Gustav I

== Events ==
- - Dissolution of the Varnhem Abbey.
