= 1540 in Sweden =

Events from the year 1540 in Sweden.

== Incumbents ==
- Monarch – Gustav I

== Events ==
- 4 January - Prince Erik is officially greeted as heir to the throne by nobility and bishops in Örebro.
- January - The reformers Olaus Petri and Laurentius Andreae are sentenced to treason but pardoned.
- - The first Evangelic mass is held in Vadstena Abbey.
- - Georg Norman inspects the churches in Västergötland and Östergötland, confiscates superfluous church valuables and registers dissident priests.

== Births ==
- November - Princess Cecilia of Sweden, princess (died 1627)
- - Abraham Angermannus, archbishop (died 1607)

== Deaths ==
- Gustav Vasa
