= 1722 in Sweden =

- Years in Sweden: 1719 1720 1721 1722 1723 1724 1725
- Centuries: 17th century · 18th century · 19th century
- Decades: 1690s 1700s 1710s 1720s 1730s 1740s 1750s
- Years: 1719 1720 1721 1722 1723 1724 1725

Events from the year 1722 in Sweden

== Incumbents ==
- Monarch – Frederick I

== Events ==
- - Women are banned from working in the Swedish Post office.

== Births ==
- 3rd of January - Fredrik Hasselqvist, naturalist and traveler (died 1752)
- 18th of March - Ulrika Eleonora von Düben, courtier and royal favorite (died 1758)
- 23rd of December - Axel Fredrik Cronstedt, mineralogist and chemist who discovered nickel (died 1765)
- - Anna Elisabeth Baer, ship owner (died 1799)

== Deaths ==
- 29th of January- Carl Gustav Rehnskiöld, Fältmarskalk (field marshal) (Born 6th August 1651, Died Age of 70)
