= 1828 in Sweden =

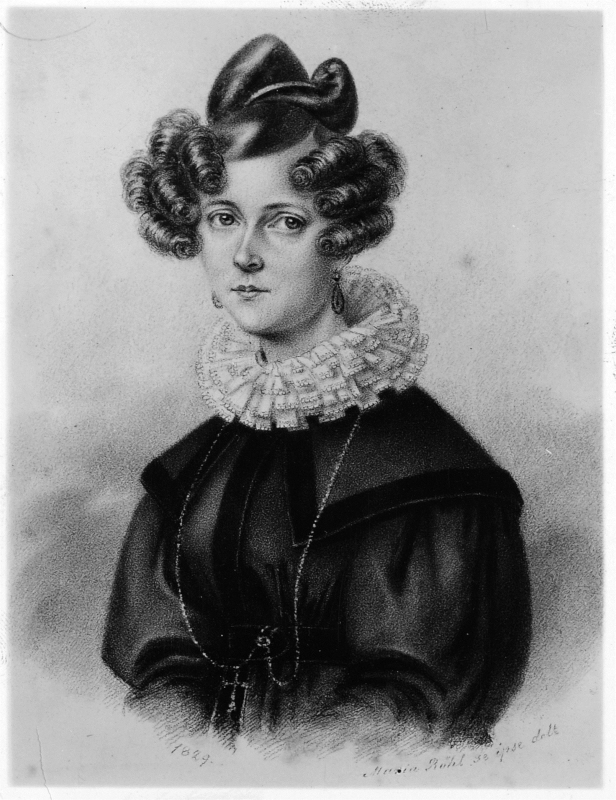
Maria Röhl - Self portrait

Events from the year 1828 in Sweden

== Incumbents ==
- Monarch – Charles XIV John

== Events ==
- - The wood trade is liberalized.
- - Sällskapet till belöning för trotjänare is created.
- Malte-Brun map of scandinavia is published as part of Conrad Malte-Brun's System of Geography, Vol. I.

== Births ==
- 20 January – Johanna Sundberg, ballerina (d. 1910)
- 9 February - Carl d'Unker, painter (died 1866)
- 2 March - Frans Hedberg, dramatist, playwright, and poet (died 1908)
- 6 August – Lotten von Kraemer, philanthropist (died 1912)
- 17 September - Louise Flodin, journalist (died 1923)
- 18 December - Viktor Rydberg, writer (died 1895)

== Deaths ==
- 26 March – Elisabeth Olin, opera primadonna (born 1740)
- 7 April - Helena Charlotta Åkerhielm, dramatist and translator (born 1786)
- 1 July - Euphrosyne Löf, actress and courtesan (born 1772)
- 25 September – Charlotte Seuerling, concert singer, harpsichordist, composer and poet, known as "The Blind Song-Maiden" (born 1782)
