= Sala Silver Mine =

Silver mine in Sweden

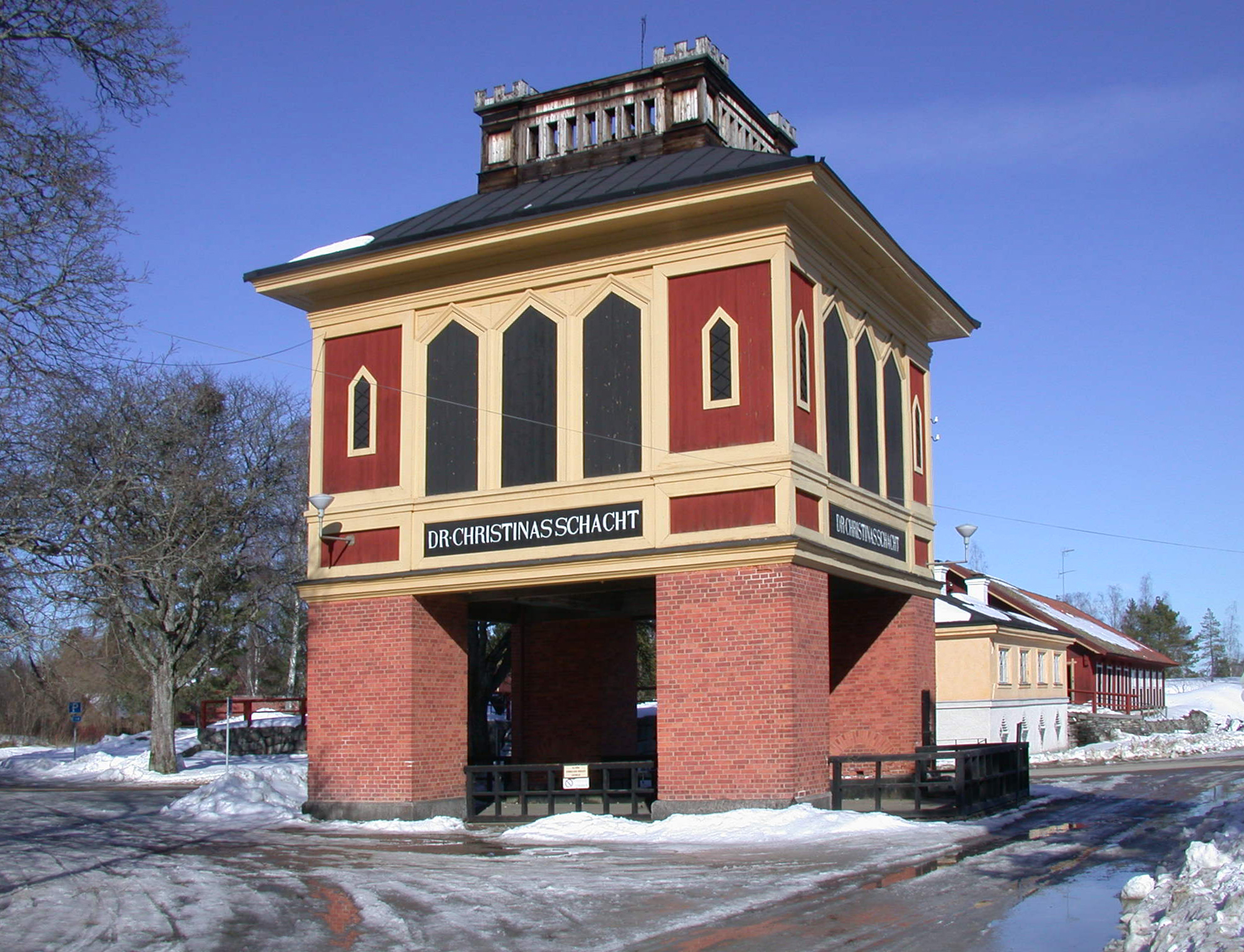
- The Queen Christina shaft of the mine

- Location within Sweden
- Location: Sala Municipality, Västmanland County, Sweden; 59°55′N 16°34′E
- Products: Silver
- Type: Underground
- Active: 15th century–1908, 1950–51

Sala Silver Mine (Swedish: Sala silvergruva) is a mine in Sala Municipality, in Västmanland County in Sweden. The mine was in continuous production from the 15th century until 1908. Additional mining occurred in 1950–1951 and also in 1945–1962 in the neighbouring Bronäs Mine.

== Geology ==
The Sala ore is mainly known for its high silver content though the ore also contained economic amounts of lead and zinc. The zinc was hosted by the mineral sphalerite while lead was hosted by the mineral galena. Silver occurred as a native phase rarely but was mainly hosted by complex antimonides and sulphosalts, dispersed in the matrices of galena and sphalerite, invisible to the naked eye but visible in microscope. The silver content in typical galena-dominated Sala ore was about 0.15% to 1%, the latter being one of the highest contents of silver in galena ever reported. In the sphalerite-dominated ore, the silver content is only about 0.015-0.02%, which was still enough to exploit and would even be at present days, given that a sufficient tonnage of metallurgically advantageous ore could be found.

The bedrock was created about 1.89 billion years ago during the paleoproterozoic era. The host rock to the mined ore is dominated by white dolomitic marble, proximal to the ores commonly rich in skarn minerals such as tremolite, serpentine, diopside and chlorite, giving the dolomitic marble at Sala a characteristic green colour. Approximately 100 meters away from the mine, more pure white dolomitic marble poor in skarn minerals is extracted at the Tistbrottet dolomite quarry.

== History ==
The mine has had three major heydays, the main one in the early 16th century, a second less significant one in the mid-17th century and a last one in the late 19th century. The last period involved re-organisation of the mine organisation (a transition from state-owned to company-owned) as well as the introduction of several new technological innovations, e.g. leaching methods employed on older mine tailings. These innovations produced temporal production peaks, yet a general lack of high-grade ore made continued production uneconomic which finally led to closure. At most, 5 million tons of rock were mined from which more than 200 million ounces of silver and about 35,000 tons of lead were extracted. The maximum depth of the mine is 318.6 metres and the length of the mine is ≈700 metres, the width is ≈100 metres.

The town of Sala emerged as a miners settlement near the mine, first in the form of a small mining village in the early days, then moved to its present location on order from the king. The king Gustavus Adolphus of Sweden gave the town its privileges in 1624. Around Sala there are numerous lakes and dams with canals, constructed to supply the mine with hydro-power for driving machines for water pumping, ore hoisting and ore smelting. None of these machines are preserved to present days.

Earlier, granite ('Sala granite') was extracted to be used as bricks for construction material northeast of the mine. Several foundations for the buildings in the mine area are built from Sala granite.

The mine was owned during later years by AB Svenska Metallverken in Västerås and Avesta Jernverks AB that until 1962 extracted lead, zinc and very little silver. The extraction was made in a mine not physically connected to the old mine. Since 1988 the mine is owned by the municipality of Sala and serves as a mining museum.

== Today ==
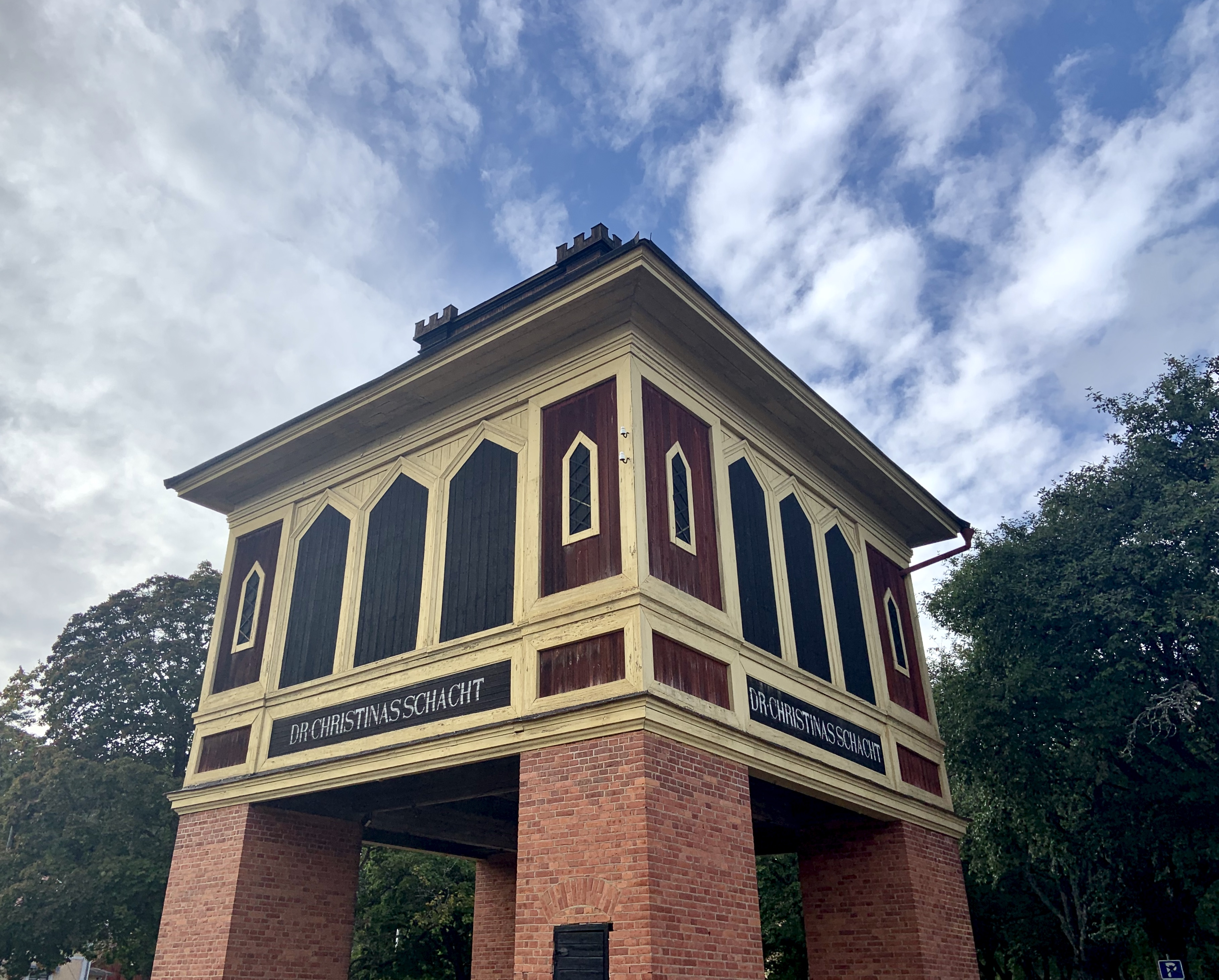
The Queen Christina shaft

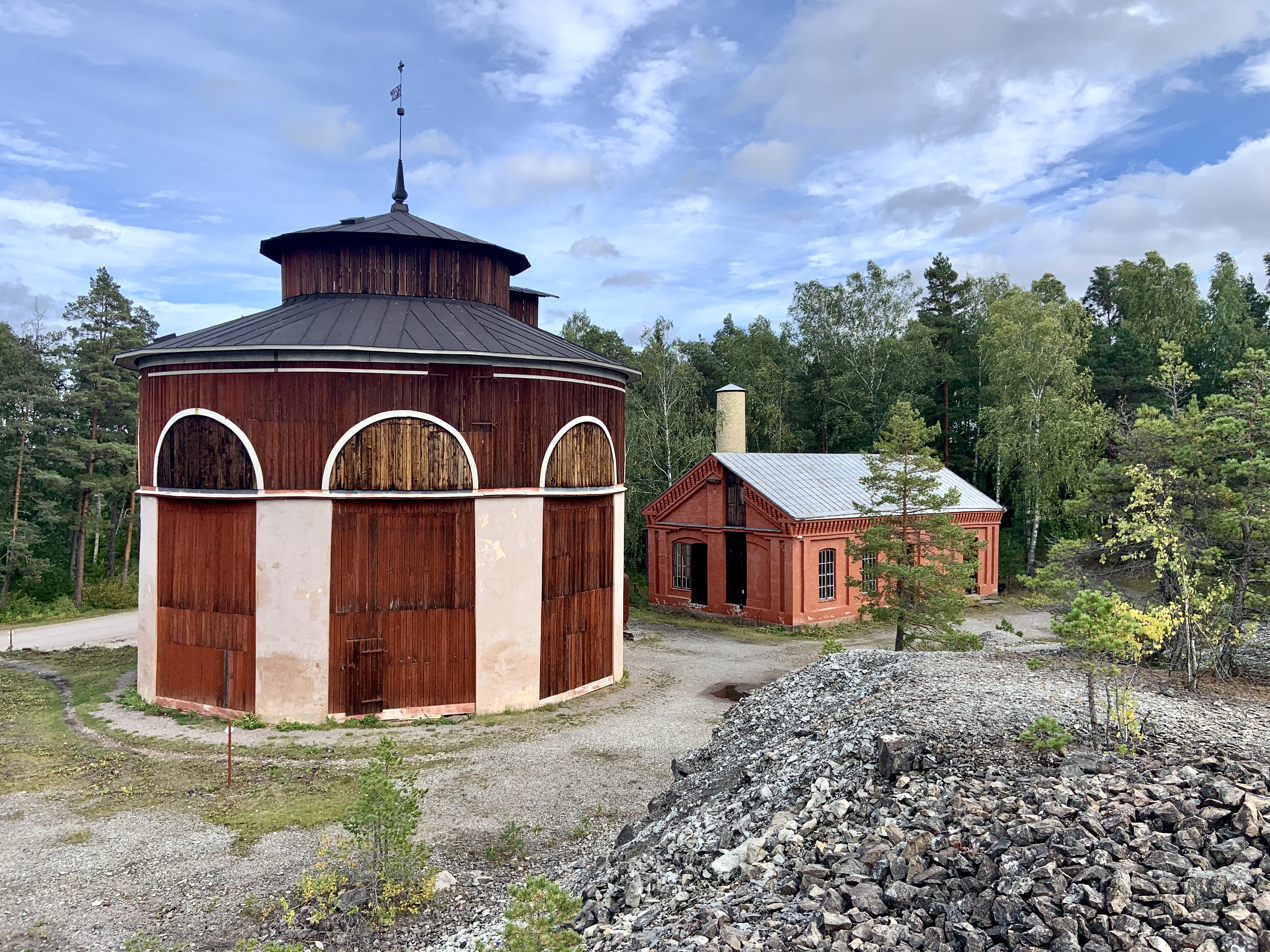
The Charles XI shaft

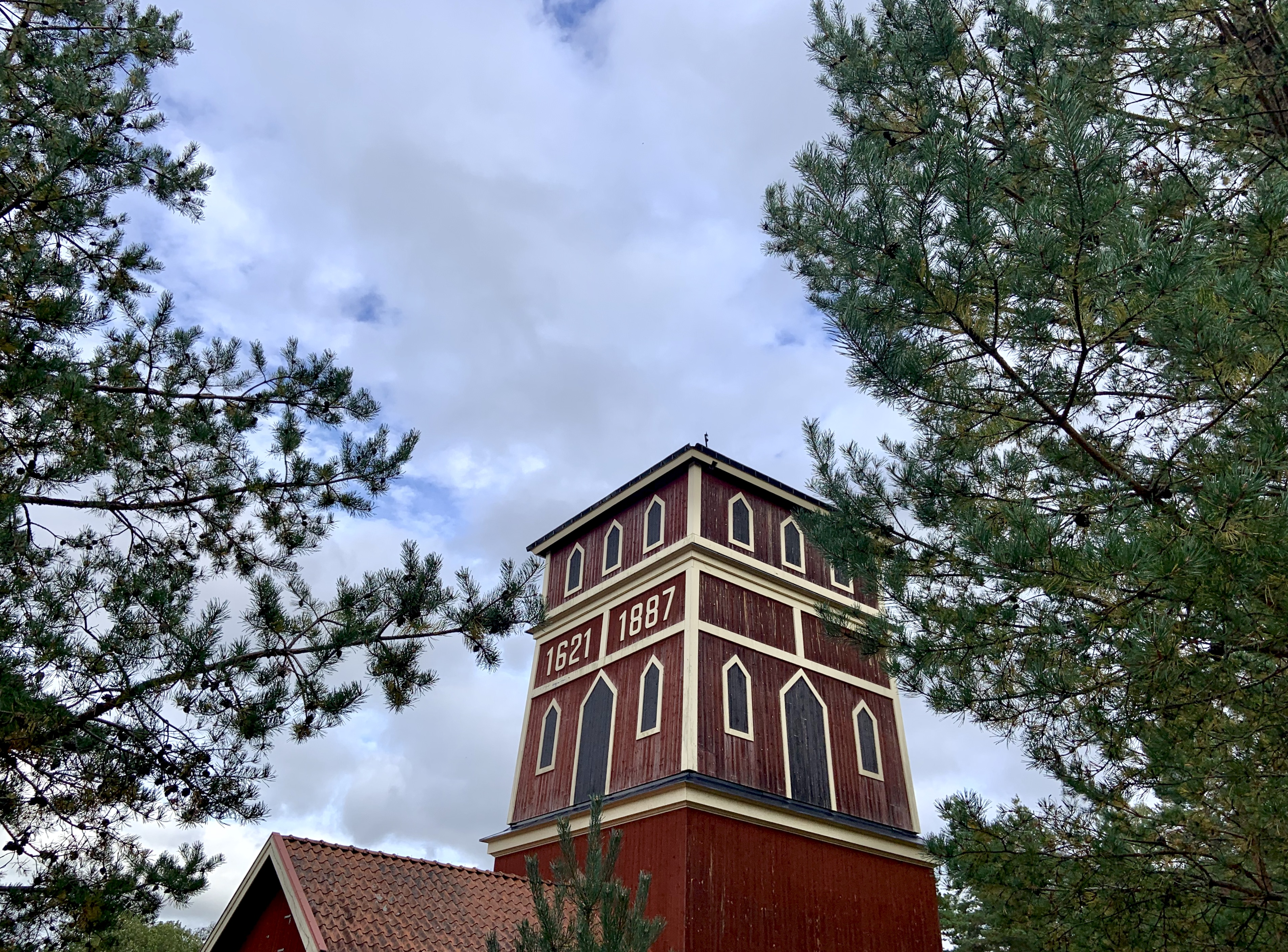
Knektschaktet

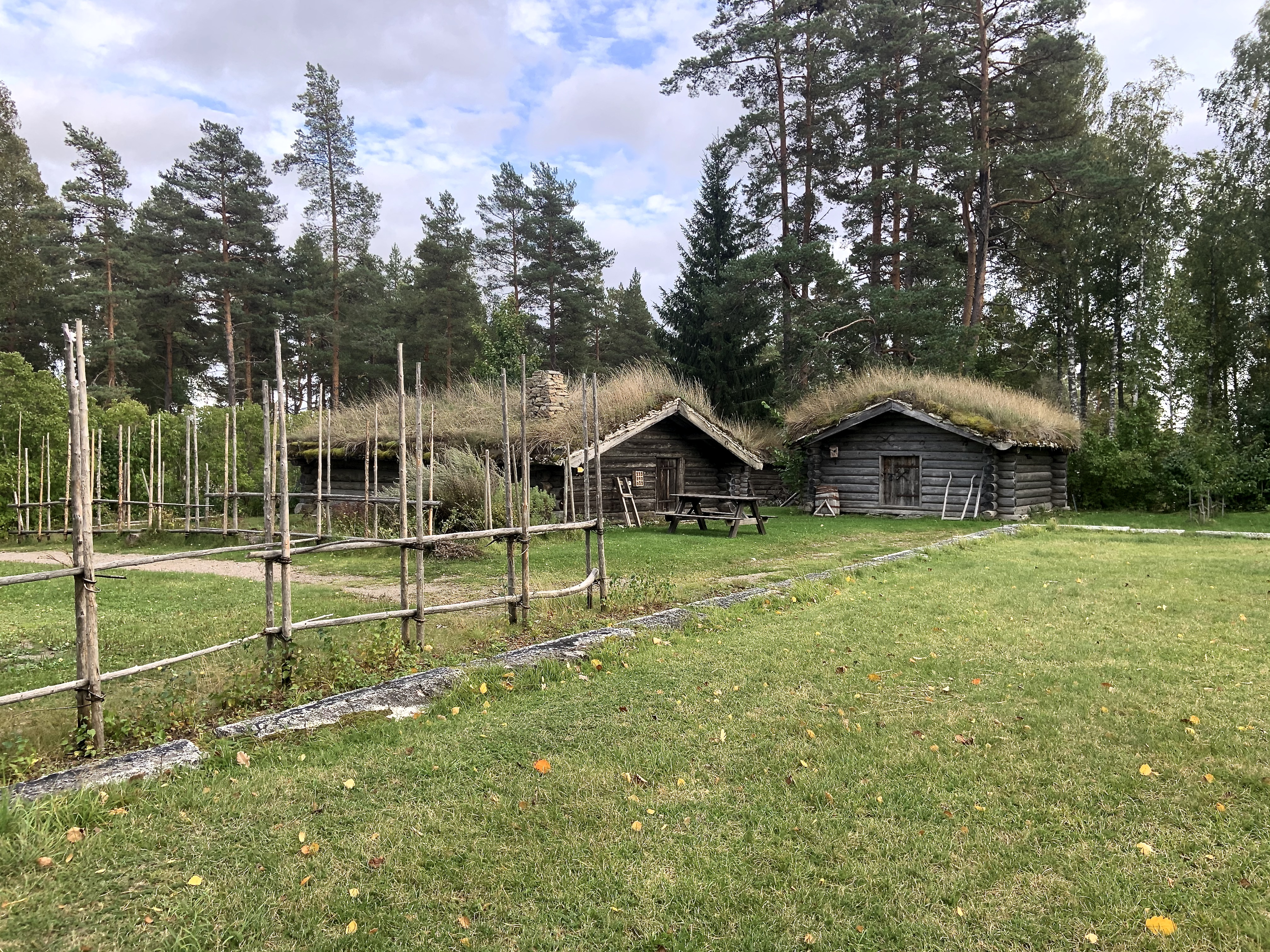
Lillgruvan, displaying life and work on a mine in the Middle Ages

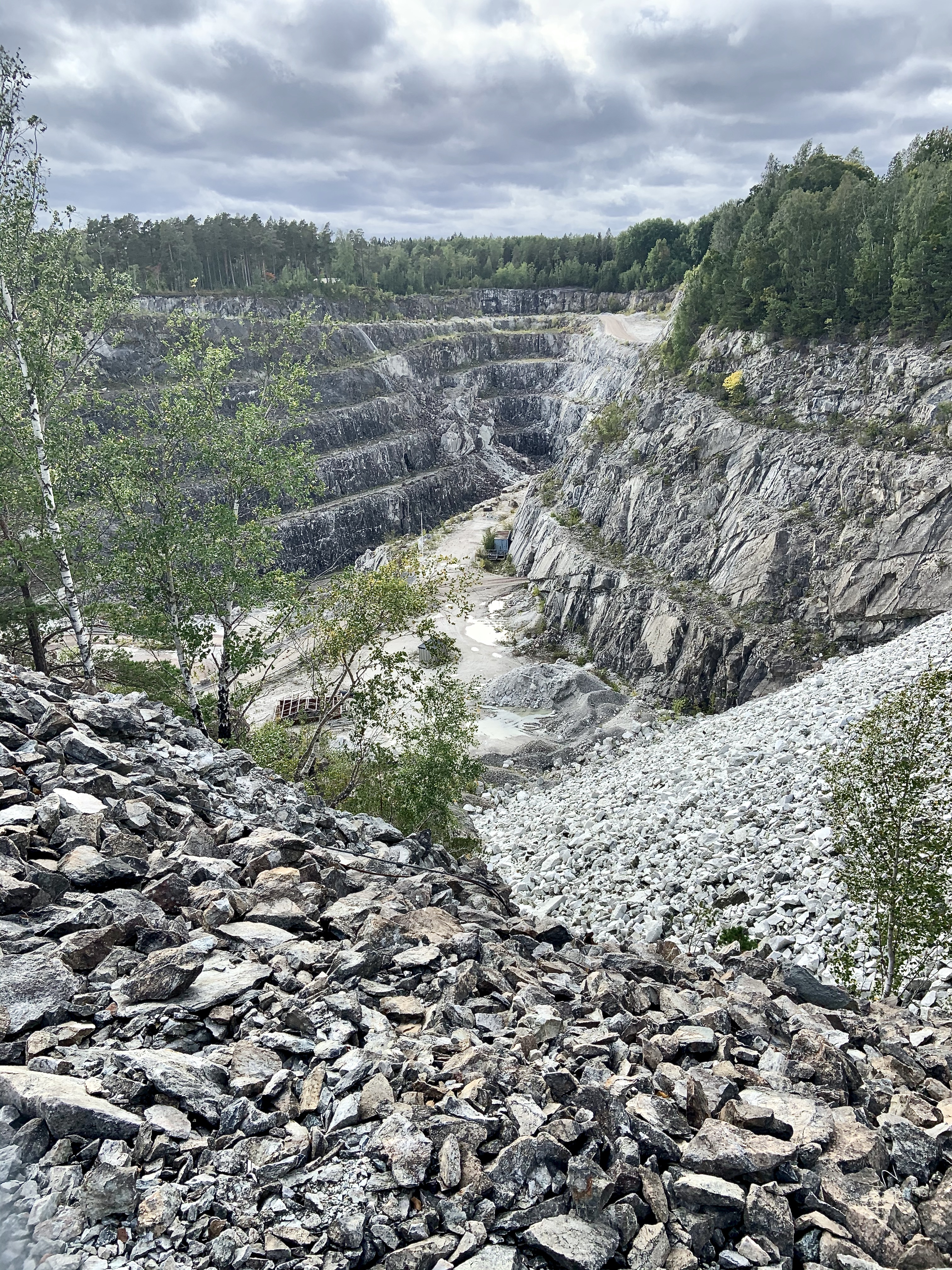
Tistbrottet dolomite pit, close to the silver mine, view towards WSW.

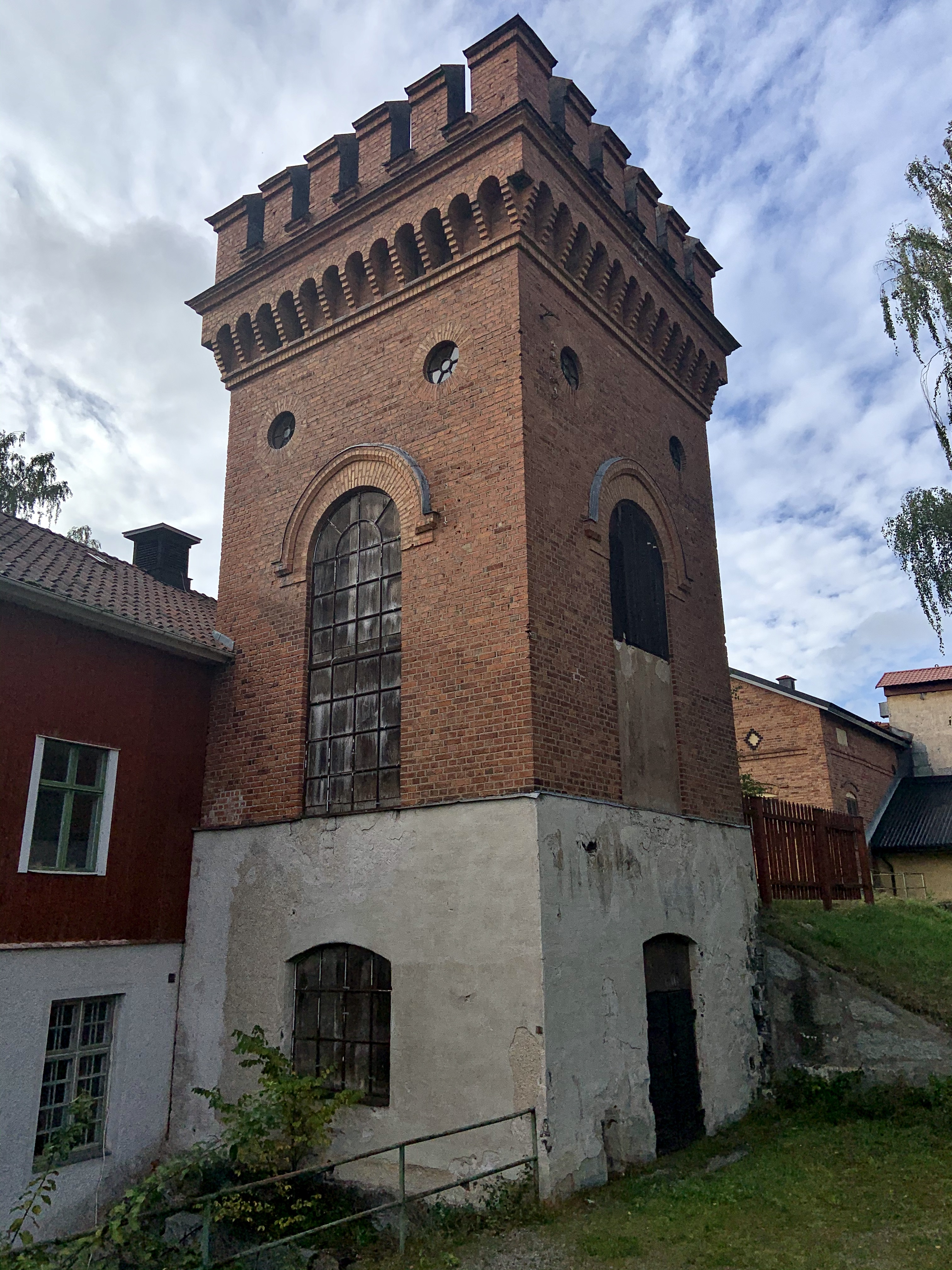
Part of a former office building

Today the mine functions mostly as an attraction, where guided tours down in the mine are arranged. In the big empty rooms in the mine, concerts and other entertainment are arranged. One of these rooms can be availed of as a bedroom, allowing for a unique overnight stay. New test-drillings have been made lately, because it is believed that a second silver treasury exists around the old one. During the 18th century people searched for the second treasury, but its depth made it hard to find. Around the old mine, cracks and erosions have caused danger for people visiting restricted areas.

Above ground, the old buildings are still used, but today they are mostly souvenir shops and museums, like an art gallery and a police museum. In July every year, the Mine's days are arranged and in December there are Christmas markets every weekend until Christmas.

In March 2008, the mine was visited by the Swedish crown princess Victoria, who left her signature down in the mine as her father, Carl XVI Gustav of Sweden, had done previously.

In August 2013 a Canadian exploration company applied for a mining lease covering a second zinc-lead-silver ore approximately 100 meters west of the historic mine.
