= 1786 in Sweden =

Events from the year 1786 in Sweden

== Incumbents ==
- Monarch – Gustav III

== Events ==
- 5 April - The Royal Swedish Academy is founded.
- 1 May – King Gustav III summon the Riksdag of the Estates to Stockholm.
- 23 June - The Riksdag of the Estates is dissolved.
- 23 October - Charter rights are given to Östersund.
- 31 October - Foundation of the Swedish West India Company
- Date unknown- The first school to give higher education to female students, the Societetsskolan, is founded in Gothenburg.
- Date unknown - Maria Christina Bruhn becomes the first woman to be given a patent as an inventor in Sweden.
- Date unknown - The first hot air balloons are released in Sweden by the popular acrobat Antonio Bartolomeo Spinacuta.

== Births ==
- 19 January – Carl Gustaf Kröningssvärd, lawyer and historian (died 1859)
- 13 May - Anna Ehrenström, poet (died 1857)
- 8 August - Bengt Erland Fogelberg, sculptor (died 1854)
- 18 September – Leonhard Fredrik Rääf, folklorist, local historian and conservative politician (died 1872)
- Helena Charlotta Åkerhielm, dramatist and translator (died 1828)

== Deaths ==
- 18 March – Gustaf Lundberg, painter (born 1695)
- 11 May - Anna Sofia Ramström, courtier (born 1738)
- 15 May - Eva Ekeblad, scientist (born 1724)
- 21 May – Carl Wilhelm Scheele, pharmaceutical chemist (born 1745)
- 22 May – Carl Fredrik Mennander, bishop (born 1712)
