= 1563 in Sweden =

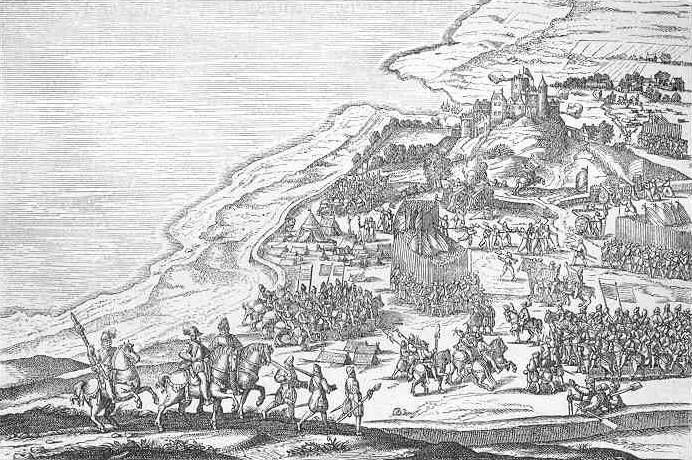

Events from the year 1563 in Sweden

== Incumbents ==
- Monarch – Eric XIV

== Events ==
- 7 June – The King's brother Duke John and his spouse are accused of treason in their absence.
- 9 August – Northern Seven Years' War
- August – A fleet conquers the province and Duchy of Finland from the King's brother John on the order of the king.
- 12 August – Duke John and his spouse are arrested for treason after the Siege of Turku, and imprisoned at Gripsholm Castle.
- 22 August – Danish occupation of Älvsborg.
- 9 November – Danish victory at the Battle of Mared
- 30 December – Swedish commander Nils Persson is given the order to invade and pillage the Danish province of Blekinge.
- – Erik XIV encourages the peasantry of Norway to rebel against Denmark.
