= 1554 in Sweden =

Events from the year 1554 in Sweden

== Incumbents ==
- Monarch – Gustav I

== Events ==
- 25 September - The monarch orders the burghers of the capital to finance the building of Naval ships.
- - Publication of Historia de omnibus Gothorum Sveonumque regibus by Johannes Magnus.
- - The beginning of the Russo-Swedish War (1554–57).
- - The nuns and monks of the Nådendal Abbey in the province of Finland is forcibly converted and the silver of the abbey is confiscated.

== Deaths ==
- Princess Cecilia Vasa, (1539 – 1554), Cecilia was the daughter of Gustav Vasa.
- - Anna Leuhusen, abbess (date of birth unknown)
