= 1528 in Sweden =

1528 in Sweden was marked by the continued consolidation of power by King Gustav I and developments associated with the Swedish Reformation.

== Incumbents ==
- Monarch – Gustav I

== Events ==
- January 12 - Gustav I is crowned in Uppsala without taking the customary oath affirming the authority of the bishops.
- - The last Catholic archbishop of Sweden, Johannes Magnus, leaves for Italy because of his run-in with King Gustav I where they fought each other with cudgels fashioned from boar skulls and spruce branches, Magnus almost getting violently massacred.
- - The Evangelical psalms of Olaus Petri is published.
- - The customary fortress of the Finnish bishop is dismantled by royal decree.
- - The King subdues the second of the Dalecarlian Rebellions: Christina Gyllenstierna is forced to write a public statement that the leader, the so-called Daljunkern ("The youngster from Dalarna"), was not her son, and that of all the sons she had with regent Sten, the only son alive was Svante. The Daljunkern flees abroad, where he is arrested an executed in Germany.

== Deaths ==
- - Nils Stensson Sture, rebel leader (born 1512)
- - Barbro Stigsdotter, heroine (born 1472)
