= 1617 in Sweden =

Events from the year 1617 in Sweden

== Incumbents ==
- Monarch – Gustaf II Adolf

== Events ==
- - The Ordningen för ständernas sammanträden 1617; the Riksdag is given a formal organization.
- - Treaty of Stolbovo
- - By the Örebro stadga, conversion to Catholicism is made punishable by death and fortitude of property.
- - Coronation of the King.
- - Ethica christiana by Laurentius Paulinus.
- - Polish–Swedish War (1617–18)

== Deaths ==
- Johannes Stephani Bellinus, a Swedish prelate and vicar in Enköping, Sweden
