= 1607 in Sweden =

Events from the year 1607 in Sweden

== Incumbents ==
- Monarch – Charles IX

== Events ==
- Coronation of Charles IX.
- Sweden retakes Paide

== Deaths ==
- February - Gustav of Sweden (born 1568)
- November - Mauritz Stensson Leijonhufvud, nobleman (born 1559)
- December - Abraham Angermannus, archbishop (born 1540)
