= 1541 in Sweden =

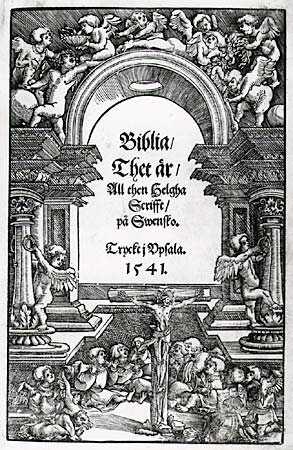
Gustav Vasa Bible

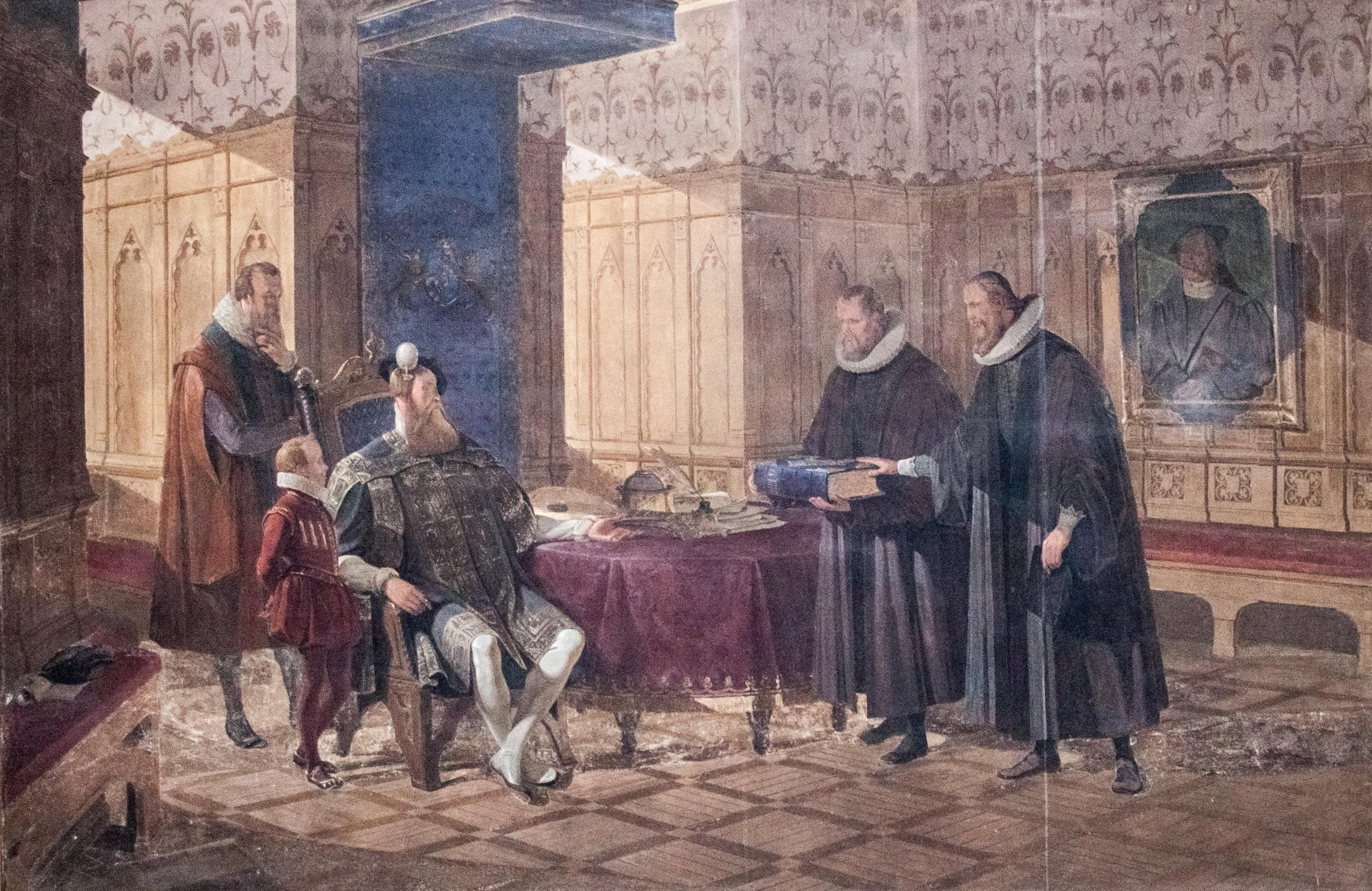

Events from the year 1541 in Sweden.

== Incumbents ==
- Monarch – Gustav I

== Events ==
- 15 September - Peace treaty between Sweden and Denmark for a period of 50 years.
- - The Gustav Vasa Bible, the first bible in the Swedish language, is printed.
- - Georg Norman inspect the churches of Småland on commission of the king, and confiscate all the church silver deemed not necessary for church service.

== Births ==
- date unknown - Anna Svantesdotter Sture (Swedish countess)

== Deaths ==
- date unknown
  - Margareta von Melen, Swedish noblewoman (b. 1489)
