= 1534 in Sweden =

Events from the year 1534 in Sweden

== Incumbents ==
- Monarch – Gustav I

== Events ==
- 2 February – Sweden joins the Count's Feud to support the Danish throne claimant Christian against the Lübeck -supported Christian II.
- - The King's brother-in-law John VII of Hoya, vassal of Viborg, joins the enemy Lübeck in the ongoing Counts Feud.
- - The Pagan holy well at Sånga is destroyed on the order of Laurentius Petri.
- 31 October – Halmstad is taken by the Swedish army.
- - The monarch conquers Viborg in the province of Finland from his brother-in-law John of Hoya, who supported Lübeck, and thereby crushes the Hanseatic influence in Finland. John of Hoya flees to Estonia.
- - The Thaler is introduced in Sweden.
- Dissolution of Riseberga Abbey: the former nuns move to Germany.

== Deaths ==
- 17 May - Peder Månsson, monk (born 1460)
- Unknown - Anders Persson, miner (born unknown)
