= 1536 in Sweden =

Sweden-related events during the year of 1536

Events from the year 1536 in Sweden

== Incumbents ==
- Monarch – Gustav I

== Events ==
- 29 August - Armistice between Sweden and Lübeck in Copenhagen: the Swedish debt to Lübeck is no longer valid.
- 1 October - Marriage between the King Gustav Vasa and Margaret Leijonhufvud.
- 2 October - Coronation of the queen.
- The Church of Sweden is made official church of the state, and the mass is to be given in the Swedish language in all of the Kingdom.
- Several members of the burgher class are arrested in Stockholm and Kalmar and executed over a suspected plot against the king. The plan was supposedly to place gunpowder under the king's seat in Storkyrkan, take Tre Kronor Castle and wait for the support of the Hanseatic League.

== Births ==
- Petrus Johannis Gothus, Swedish author and translator is born
- Olof Stenbock, noble and member of the Riksråd is born

== Deaths ==
- 31 December - Margareta Eriksdotter Vasa, the sister of the king (born 1497)
