= 1527 in Sweden =

Events from the year 1527 in Sweden

== Incumbents ==
- Monarch – Gustav I

== Events ==
- The Swedish Reformation is initiated. All sermons in henceforth to be held in the native language, the military power of the bishops is dissolved, all goods belonging to the Catholic convents is open to confiscation by the crown and the relatives of those who once donated it to the convent in accordance with the Reduction of Gustav I of Sweden, and Catholic convents are banned from accepting new novices without a special dispensation from the crown.
- Dissolution of the St. Clare's Priory, Stockholm
- Dissolution of the Vårfruberga Abbey
- The second of the Dalecarlian Rebellions.

== Deaths ==
- Sigrid Eskilsdotter (Banér), landowner and grandmother of the king
- Peder Jakobsson, Catholic priest – 18 February
- Knut Mikaelsson, Catholic priest – 21 February
- Peder Bengtsson Gylta, official and monastic priest – 24 April
- Anna Swenonis, manuscript illuminator – 31 July
