= Catharina Justander =

Finnish missionary (1723–1778)

Catharina Justander (Lempäälä, 1723 - Zeist, 5 October 1778) was a Finnish (Swedish) missionary. As a missionary, she played a leading role in spreading the Moravian Church in Stockholm (Sweden), Turku (Finland) and Zeist (The Netherlands), and was made an Acolyte.
