= 1728 in Sweden =

Events from the year 1728 in Sweden

== Incumbents ==
- Monarch – Frederick I

== Births ==
- date unknown - Johan Philip Korn, painter (died 1796)

== Deaths ==
- 10 April - Nicodemus Tessin the Younger, architect, city planner (died 1654)
- 16 February - Maria Aurora von Königsmarck, courtier, royal mistress, amateur actress and famous beauty (died 1662)
