= 1634 in Sweden =

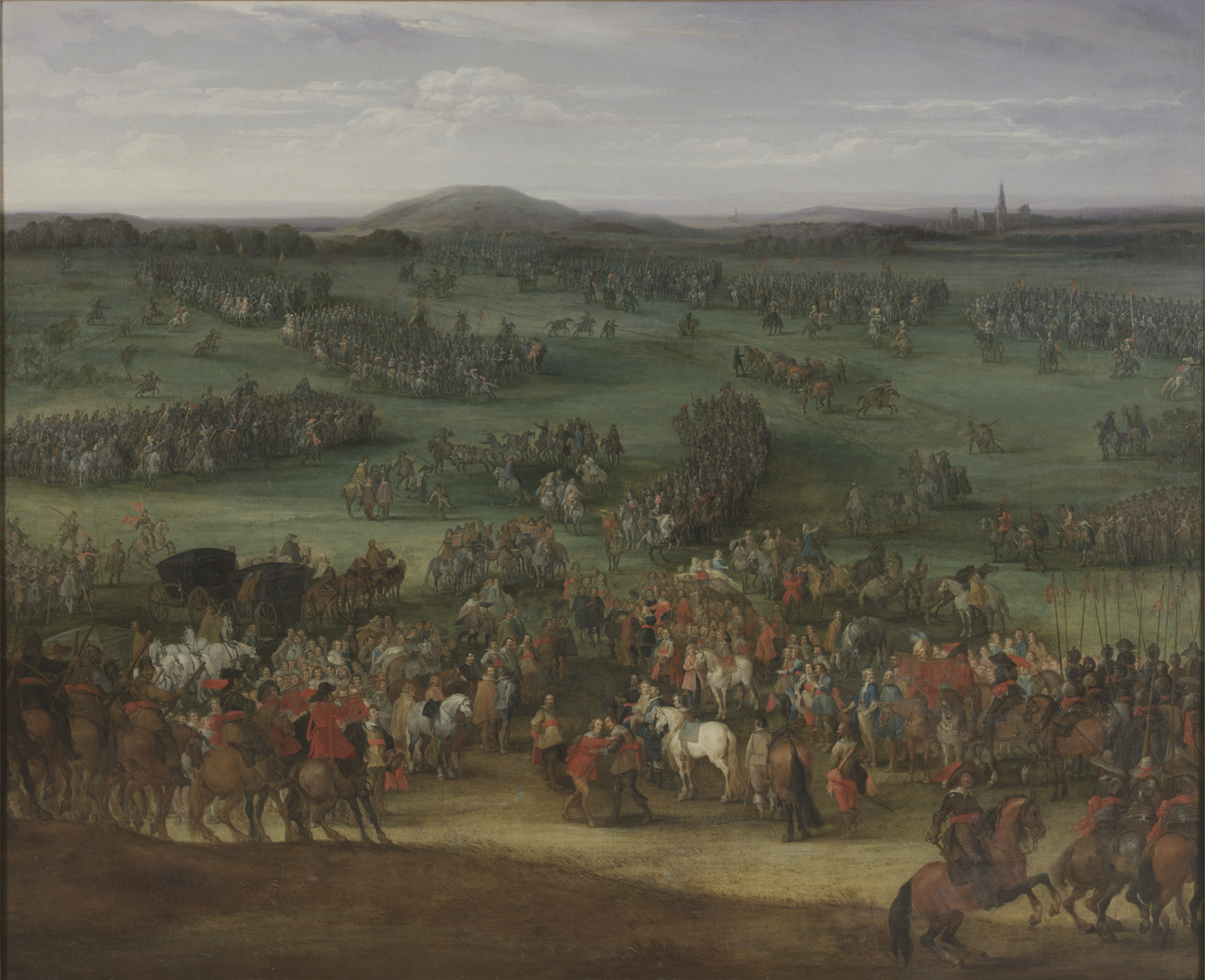
The Battle of Nördlingen by Pieter Meulener

Events from the year 1634 in Sweden

== Incumbents ==
- Monarch – Christina

== Events ==
- Swedish victory at the Battle of Liegnitz.
- Burial of the dead King.
- Instrument of Government (1634)
- Battle of Nördlingen (1634)
- Ramsele witch trial

== Births ==
- Tomas Polus, statesman and diplomat (d. 1708).
