= 1723 in Sweden =

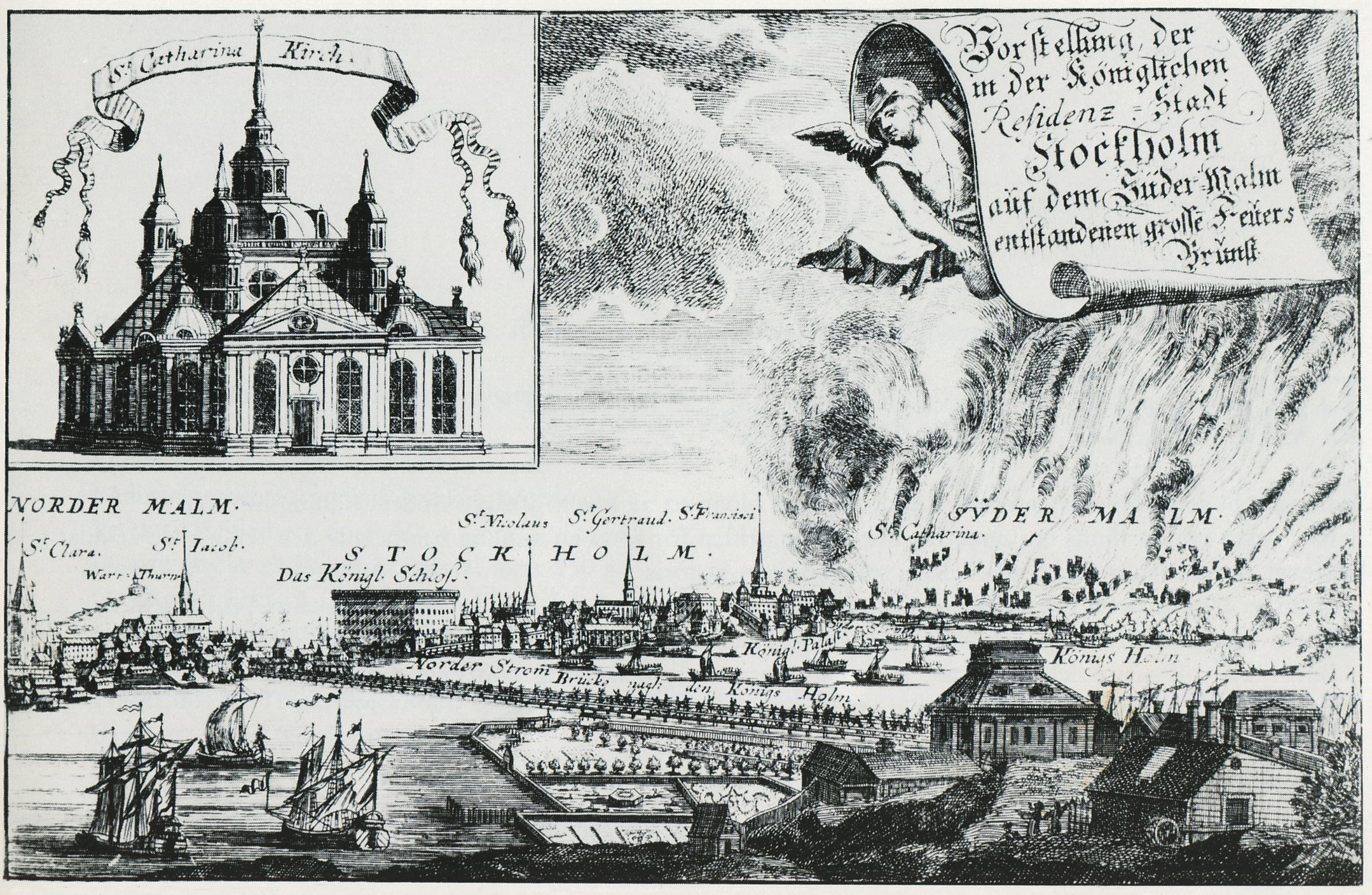
Katarinabranden 1723

Events from the year 1723 in Sweden.

== Incumbents ==
- Monarch – Frederick I

== Events ==
- January – The Estates of the Realm is assembled. The party in favor of naming Charles Frederick, Duke of Holstein-Gottorp as heir to the throne is strengthened, supported by the Empire of Russia.
- The Estates of the Realm passes a new Order on Parliamentary Proceedings, which will be a cornerstone of the Age of Liberty in Sweden. It is one of the fundamental laws of Sweden together with the Instrument of Government of 1719/1720.
- January – Frederick I tries, but fail, to strengthen the royal power against the parliament with the support of Hovpartiet, the Holstein Party fills the royal council with its followers, and Arvid Horn become a leading force within Swedish politics.
- 1 May - A great fire in Stockholm destroys the Katarina Church and a large part of the city around it.
- 17 October - A law is passed, in which the Riksdag of the Estates is granted power over the monarch and the royal council.
- - The farmers of the state are allowed to buy the land they use.
- - The Lutheran church begin to persecute Pietism, which is becoming popular in Sweden and spreading by the home coming Carolean soldiers from the Great Northern War.
- - A new educational law is passed were all parents are obliged ensure that their children knows how to read and write.
- - A French opera company, the Académie royale de musique (Stockholm), are employed to perform at Bollhuset.

== Births ==
- 5 April - Catherine Charlotte De la Gardie, countess and heroine, famed as a pioneer of vaccination and for preventing a witch trial (died 1763)
- 9 May - Pehr Osbeck, explorer, naturalist (died 1805)
- 11 October - Hedvig Strömfelt, psalm writer and a leading member of Moravian Church (died 1766)
- - Maria Carowsky, painter (died 1793)
- - Eva Merthen, war heroine (died 1811)
- Catharina Justander, Finnish (Swedish) pietist missionary (died 1778)

== Deaths ==
- Gabriel Stierncorna, baron and civil servant (born 1669)
- Beata Elisabet von Königsmarck, countess and landowner (born 1637)
