= 1659 in Sweden =

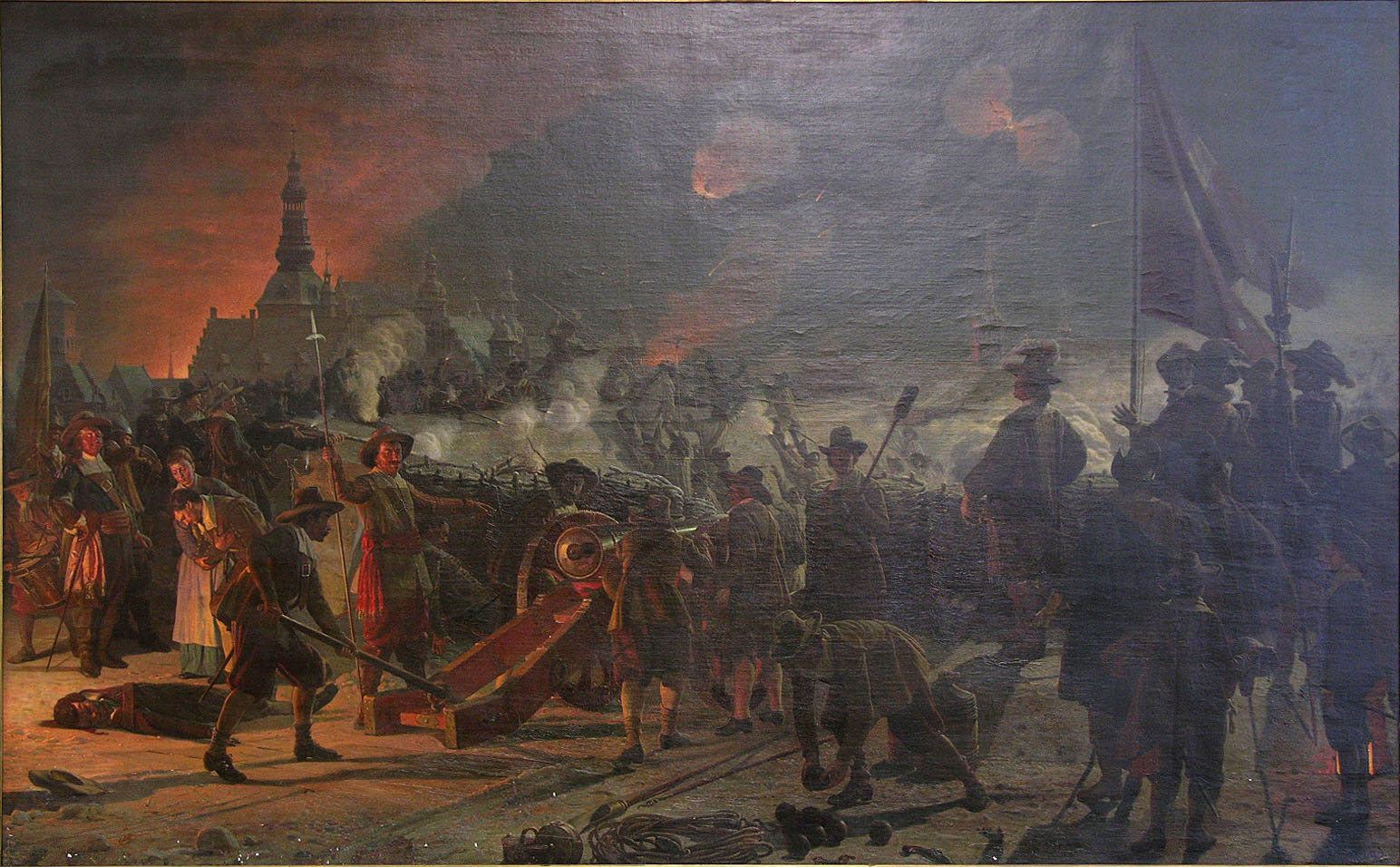
Assault on Copenhagen (1659) during the 1658/59 siege

Events from the year 1659 in Sweden

== Incumbents ==
- Monarch – Charles X Gustav

== Events ==
- The Assault on Copenhagen begins.
- Swedish occupation of Chojnice.
- 11 February - Failed Swedish attempt to storm Copenhagen.
- Swedish occupation of Langeland.
- Battle of Femerbält.
- Swedish occupation of Falster, Lolland and Nakskov.
- Swedish occupation of Fredericia.
- Swedish occupation of Møn.
- 23 July - Battle of Ebeltoft.
- End of the Swedish occupation of Courland.
- 14 November - Battle of Nyborg.

== Births ==
- 29 April - Sophia Elisabet Brenner, writer (died 1730)
- 15 April - Adam Ludwig Lewenhaupt, general (died 1719)
- 29 September - Michael Dahl, painter (died 1743)
