= 1637 in Sweden =

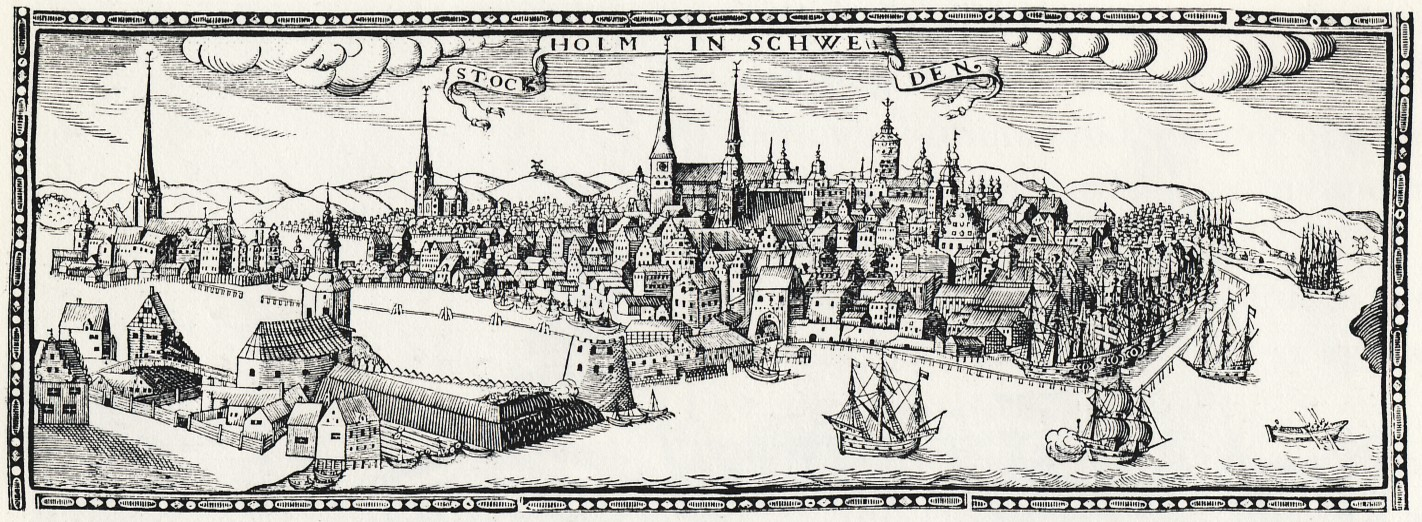
Stockholm panorama 1637

Events from the year 1637 in Sweden

== Incumbents ==
- Monarch – Christina

== Events ==
- The first regulation of the Romani, Placat om Tatrarnes fördrifvande av landet, declares all Romani expelled from Sweden: all adult men are sentenced to death while women and children are to be hunted over the borders.
- The last Duke of Pomerania Bogislaw XIV dies without a clear heir and leaves the duchy to the Swedish Crown
- Johan Banér's host is forced to abandon their siege of Leipzig as an Imperial relief force nears the city, they pull back to Torgau before once more being forced to retreat to Pomerania due to fears of an encirclement
- Laurentius Paulinus Gothus is made Archbishop of Uppsala and Primate of Sweden
- Gese Wechel becomes the first female manager of the Swedish Post Office.
- The New Sweden Company is endorsed by the Swedish Government.
- Peter Minuit from Holland sails with Kalmar Nyckel and Fogel Grip to Delaware in order to create a settlement called New Sweden.

== Births ==
- Axel Julius De la Gardie, field marshal and governor general (died 1710)
- Beata Elisabet von Königsmarck, countess and landowner (died 1723)
- Catarina Wentin, Royal Midwife (Died 1707)
- Petrus Aurivillius, theologian, philosopher and Rector at Uppsala University (died 1677)
- Didrik Wrangel, Swedish cout and royal advisor (died 1706)
- Joel Gripenstierna, Swedish investor and civil servant, one of the richest men in Sweden at the time (died 1697)

== Deaths ==
- Peder Falck, Swedish Rittmaster ennobled 1626
- Hans Matthiæ, personal priest to the then Duke Charles IX of Sweden
- Didrik Yxhull, son of Hofmarschall Wollmar Yxhull
