= 1648 in Sweden =

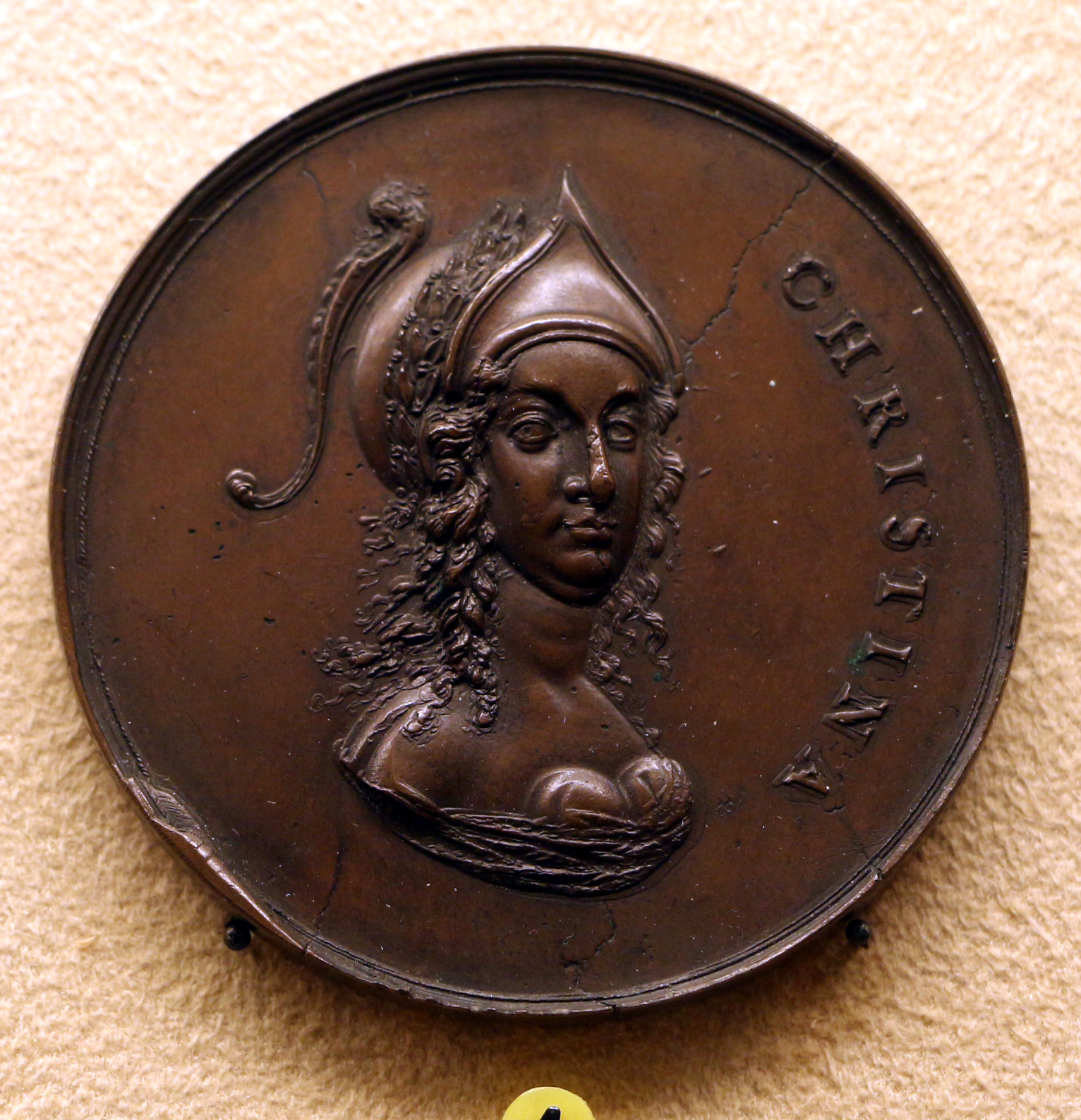

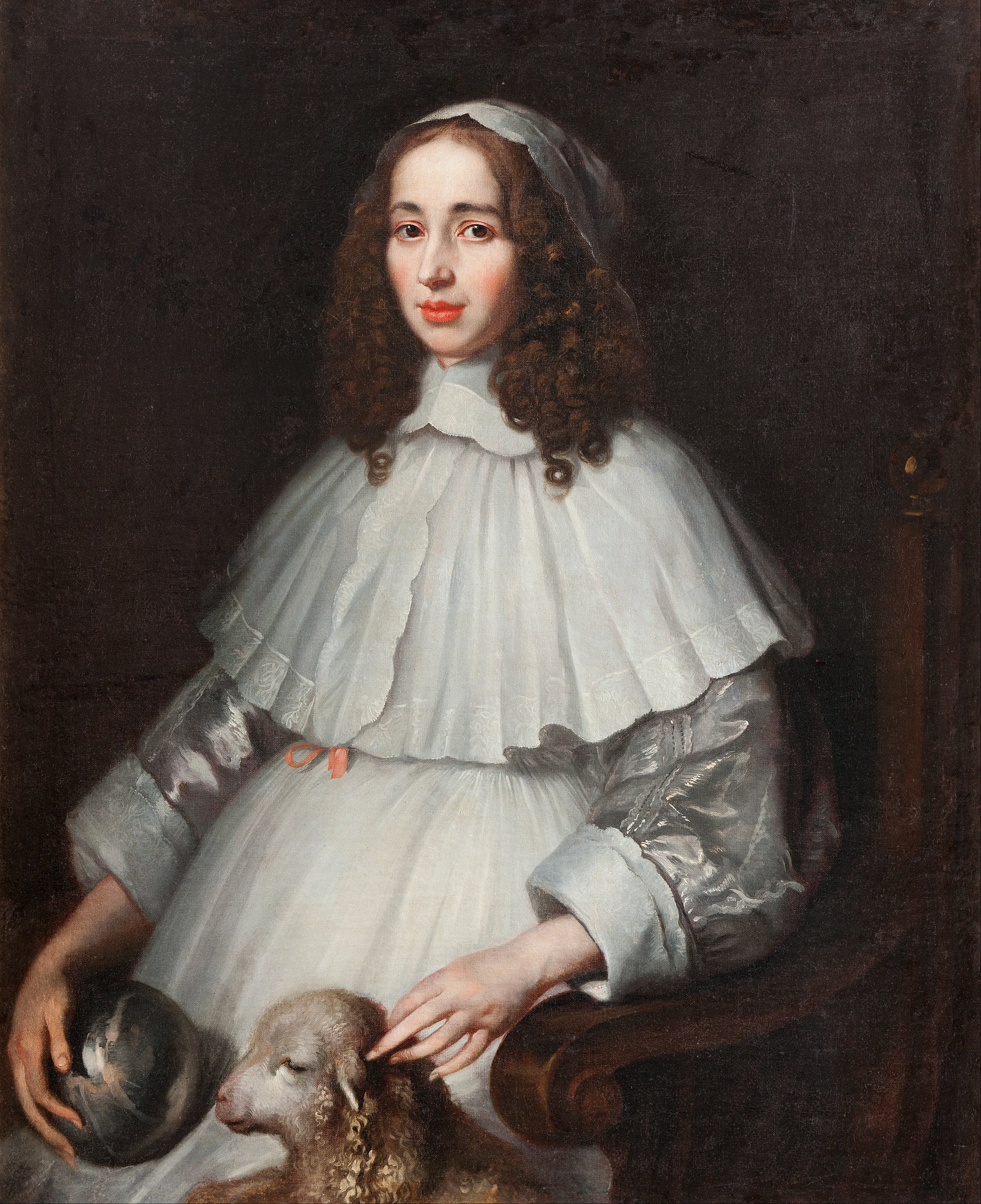

Events from the year 1648 in Sweden

== Incumbents ==
- Monarch – Christina

== Events ==
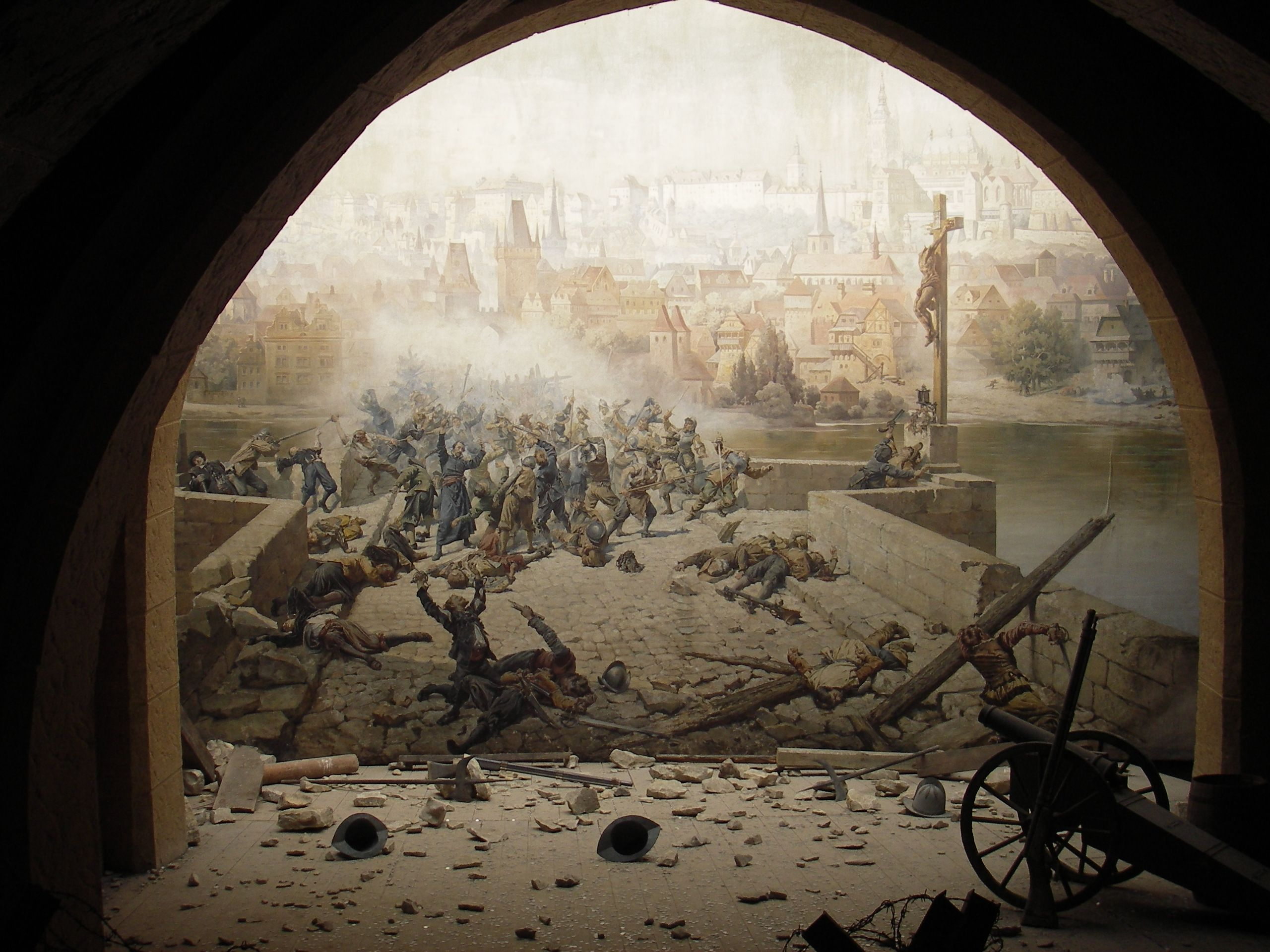
Battle on Charles Bridge - 1648

- 17 May - Battle of Zusmarshausen
- 16 July–19 July – The Battle of Prague takes place in the Thirty Years' War. The west bank of Prague (including Prague Castle) is occupied and looted by Swedish armies.
- October 24 – Signing of the Treaties of Münster and Osnabrück conclude the Peace of Westphalia, ending the Thirty Years' War. Rulers of the Imperial States have powers to decide their state religion, Protestant, Catholic, or Calvinist, with the minorities of each of those faiths granted toleration of worship, and there is general recognition of exclusive sovereignty, including that of the Dutch Republic and Switzerland. France and Sweden gain territory, and the latter is granted an indemnity. However, France remains at war with Spain until 1659.
- - Johan Adler Salvius appointed riksråd by the Queen despite the opposition of the Oxenstierna party.
- - Queen Dowager Maria Eleonora returns from exile.

== Births ==
- - Martin Mijtens the Elder, painter (died 1736)

== Deaths ==
- Emerentia Pauli, heroine of Gullberg Fortress (born year unknown)
