= 1653 in Sweden =

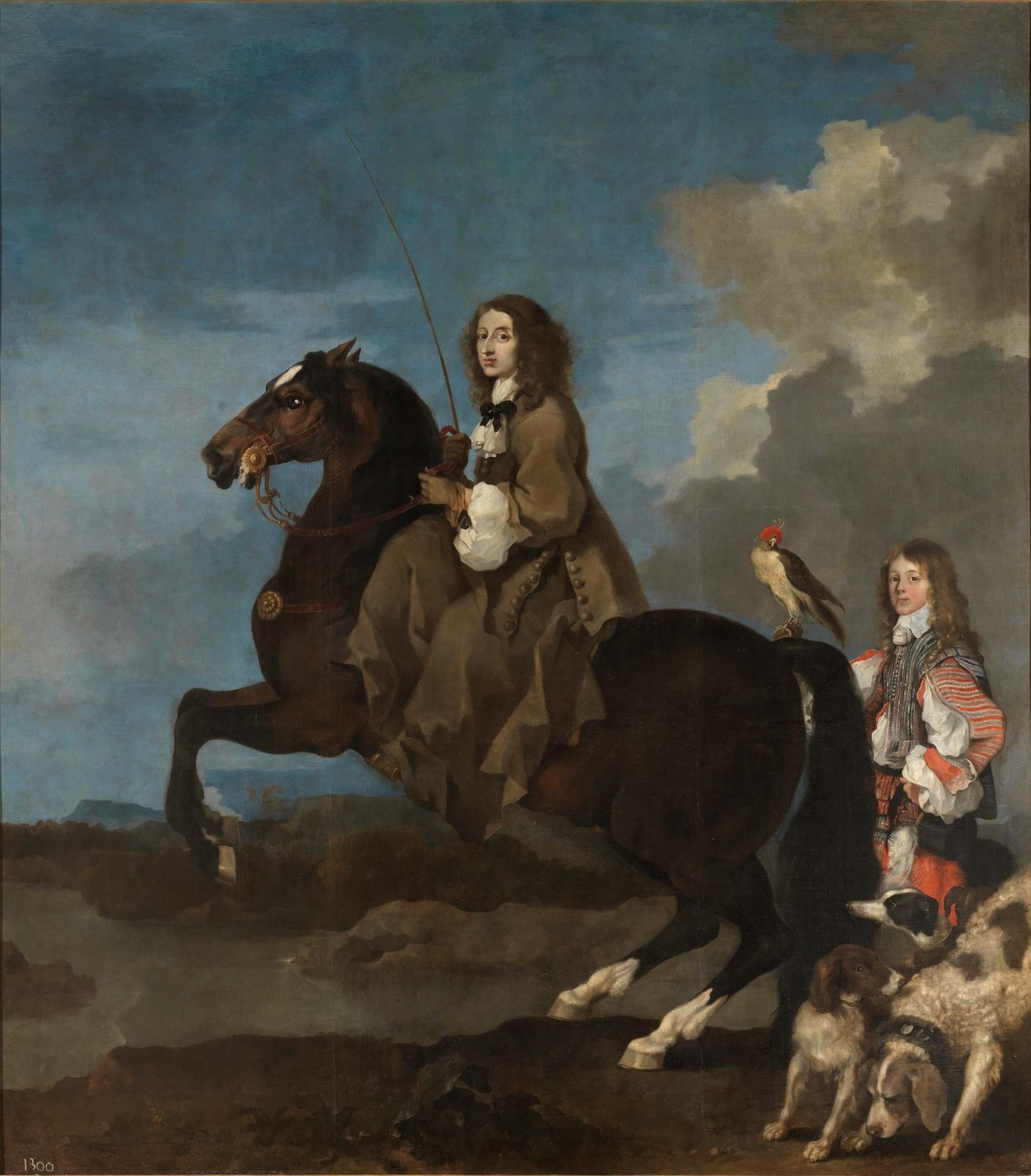
Sébastien Bourdon and Queen Christina of Sweden, in 1653.

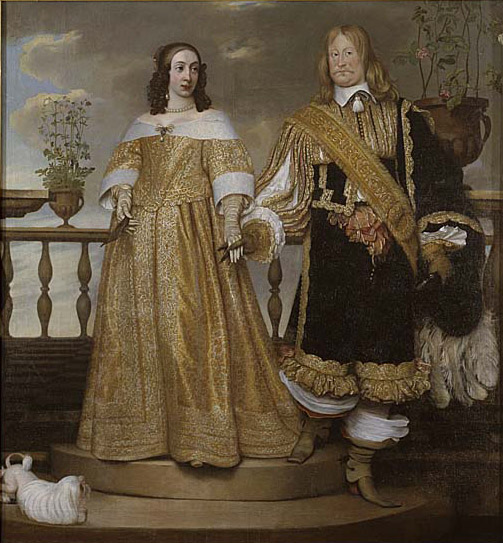

Events from the year 1653 in Sweden

== Incumbents ==
- Monarch – Christina

== Events ==
- Magnus Gabriel De la Gardie is removed from his office and exiled from court.
- March-April - A small peasant rebellion takes place in Närke, called Morgonstjärneupproret (Rebellion of the Morning Star), against famine and conscription: the uprising is quickly defeated.
- End of The fronde in France. Cardinal Mazarin becomes First Minister.
- Queen Kristina establishes the Amaranthe Order in Stockholm.
- Gustaf Horn becomes a Swedish Royal Marshal.

== Births ==
- 2 March: Jonas Petri Linnerius

Bishop in Lund.

- 26 August: Per Banér

Swedish military officer.

- Nils Gripenhielm

Swedish politician and landowner.

- Per Hård

Swedish general and landowner.

- Gustaf Adolf af Wasaborg

Swedish count and military officer, son of Gustaf Gustavsson af Wasaborg, illegitimate son of Gustav Adolf II.

== Deaths ==
- 7 April: Elsa Beata Brahe

Swedish noblewoman.

- 2 October: Hans Drake

Swedish military officer.

- 25 October: Gustaf Gustavsson af Wasaborg

Swedish count and royal advisor, illegitimate son of Gustav Adolf II.
