= 1520 in Sweden =

- Decades: 1500s; 1510s; 1520s; 1530s; 1540s
- See also: Other events of 1520; Timeline of Swedish history

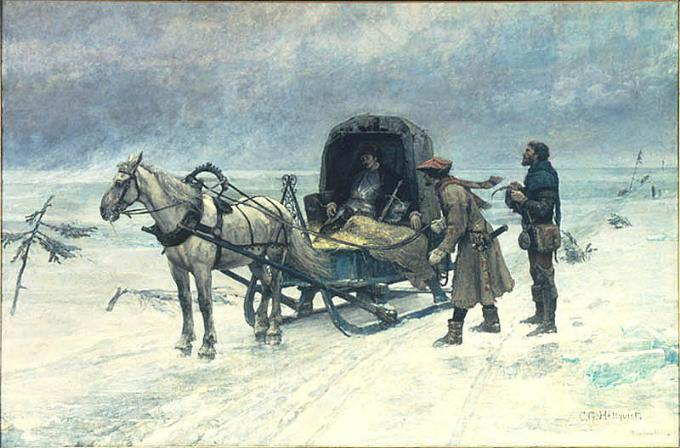
Death of Sten Sture the Younger

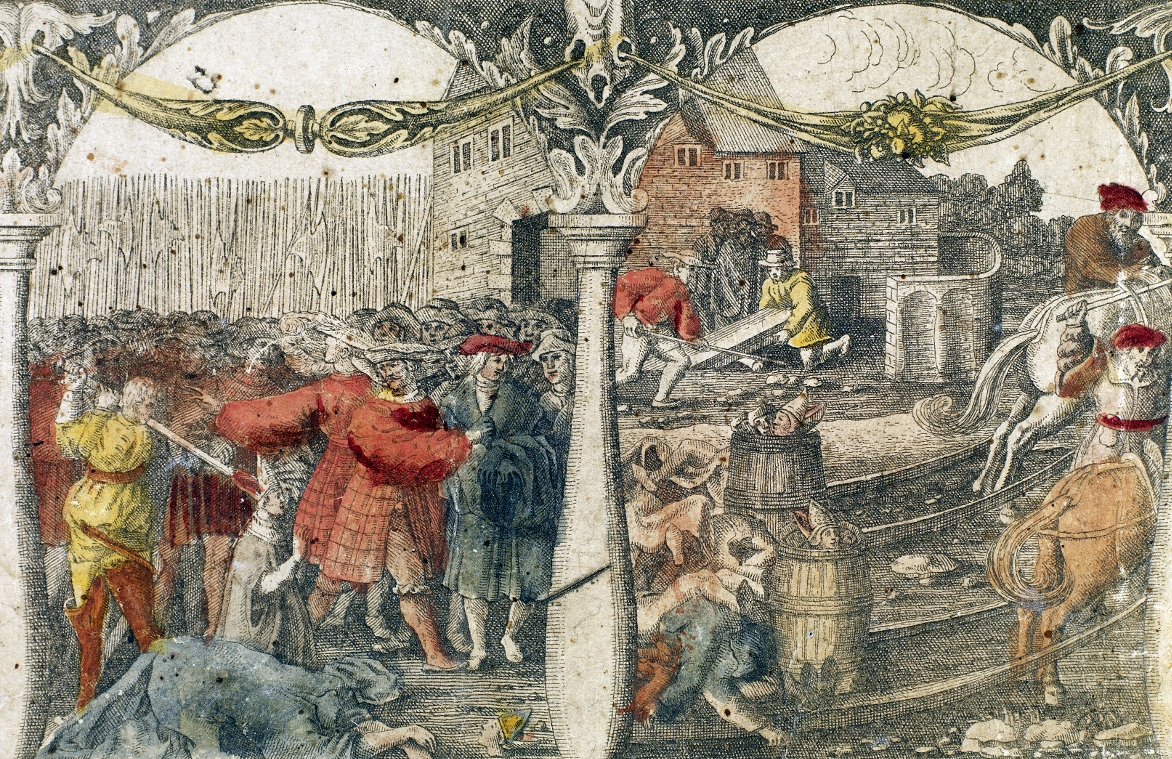
Stockholm Bloodbath

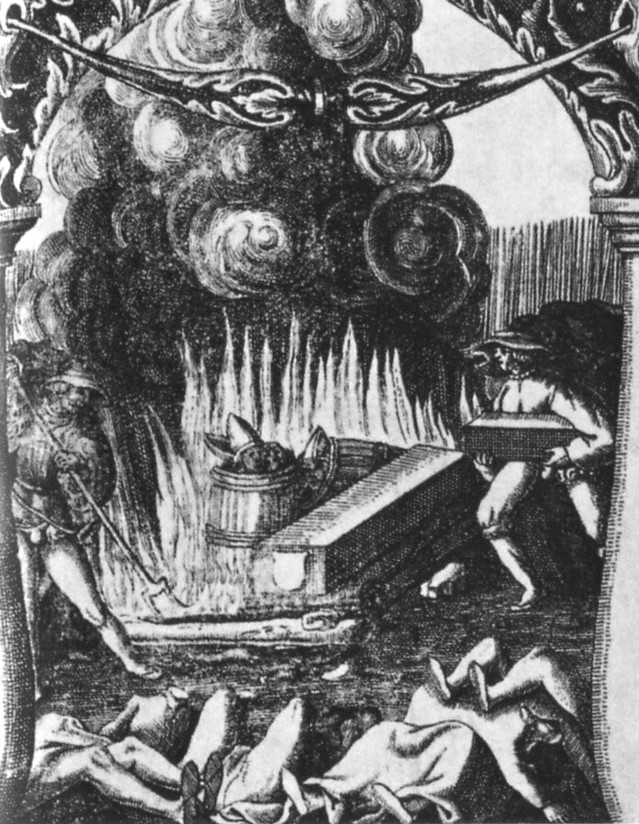
Blodbadstavlan scen 5

Events from the year 1520 in Sweden.

== Incumbents ==
- Monarch – Christian II

== Events ==
- January - Danish invasion by Christian II of Denmark.
- January 19 - Battle of Bogesund.
- 3 February – Sten Sture the Younger dies. Danish troops takes Västerås. Sture's widow Christina Gyllenstierna takes command of the city of Stockholm as the head of the Sture party. Anna Eriksdotter (Bielke) take command of the city of Kalmar.
- 6 March – Several members of the Swedish riksråd make peace with Christian II of Denmark and acknowledge him as Swedish monarch in Uppsala.
- 29 March - Swedish defeat at the Battle of Badelundaåsen.
- 6 April - Swedish defeat outside Uppsala.
- 31 May - Gustav Vasa return to Sweden at Kalmar.
- 5 September – The Siege of Stockholm is put to an end after a peace treaty between Christian II and Christina Gyllenstierna, were full amnesty are guaranteed all the participants in the Swedish rebellion against Denmark.
- 7 September – The official entry of Christian II in Stockholm.
- October - Christian II introduces the right of his family to inherit the throne of Sweden. He also reinstate the deposed arch bishop Gustav Trolle.
- 1 November – Christian II formally elected monarch of Sweden.
- 4 November – Coronation of Christian II in Stockholm by Gustav Trolle. Sören Norby, Berend von Mehlen and Otto Krumpen is knighted.
- 7 November – The coronation festivities is interrupted with the arrest of those implicated in the deposition of Trolle. Participants in the rebellion in Denmark, the amnesty are circumvented as they are sentenced to death for heresy by participation in the deposition of an arch bishop.
- 7-10 November - Stockholm Bloodbath.
- 25 November – Gustav Vasa escape Stockholm for Dalarna. His adventurous escape is later made national legend, and includes the incident with Barbro Stigsdotter.
- December - Gustav Vasa fail in persuading the peasantry to rebel against the Danes in his speech in Mora, and leaves Sweden for Norway.
- December - A rebellion against the Danes by Klas Kyle in Småland fails.

== Births ==
- 31 May– Dorothea of Denmark, Electress Palatine, princess (died 1580)
- May – Per Brahe the Elder, riksråd (died 1590)
- 5 November – Pontus De la Gardie, soldier (died 1585)
- 24 December – Martha Leijonhufvud, politically active noble and landholder (died 1584)
- Unknown date – Andreas Laurentii Björnram, Archbishop of Uppsala (died 1593)
- Unknown date – Katarina Bengtsdotter Gylta, Abbess (died 1593)

== Deaths ==
- 3 February – Sten Sture the Younger, regent (b. 1493)
- 5 March – Christina Brask, writer (b. 1450)
- 8 November – Erik Johansson Vasa, riksråd (b. 1470)
- 16 December – Hemming Gadh, bishop and politician (b. 1450)
