= 1523 in Sweden =

- Decades: 1500s; 1510s; 1520s; 1530s; 1540s
- See also: Other events of 1523; Timeline of Swedish history

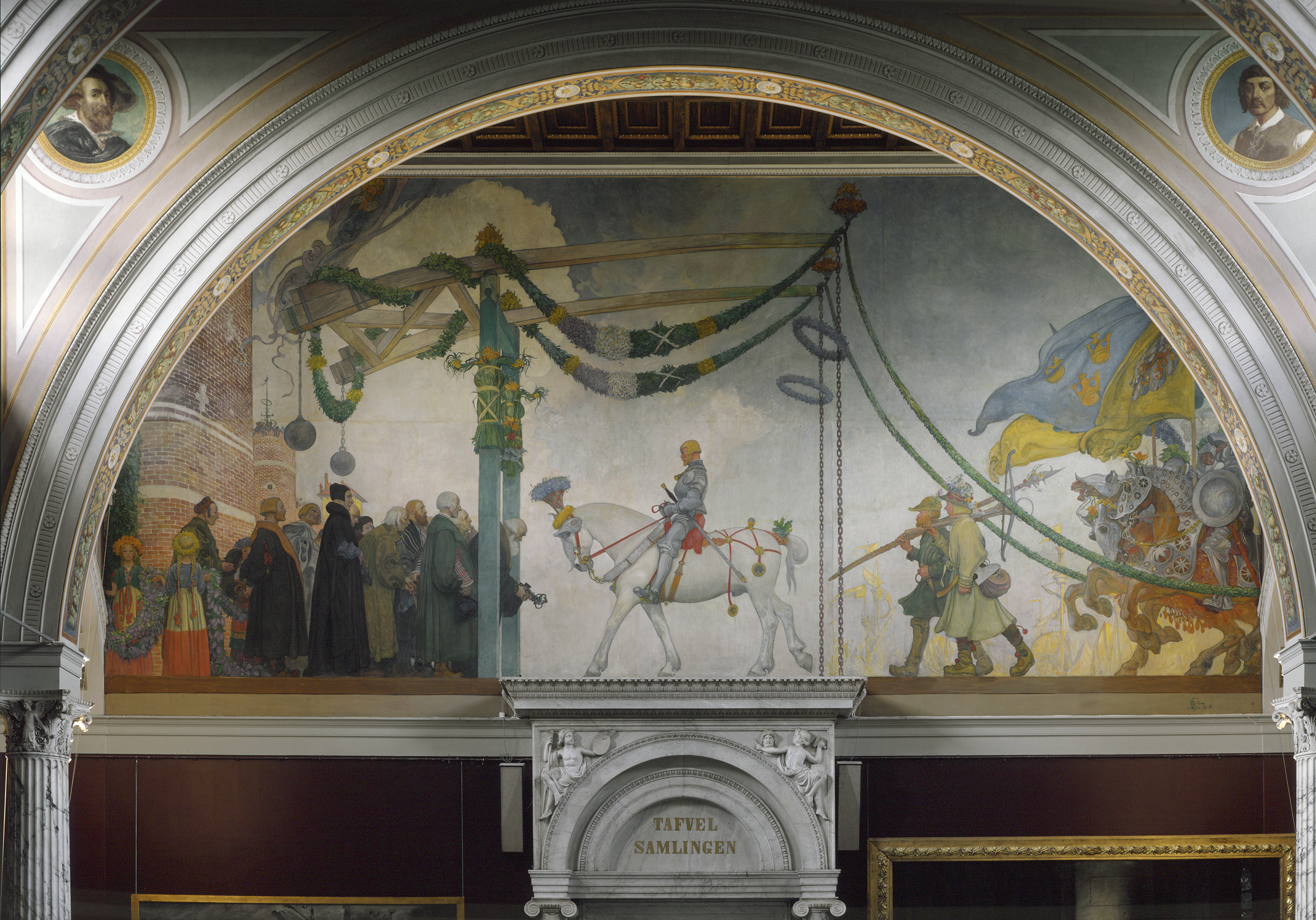
The Entry of King Gustav Vasa of Sweden into Stockholm - color

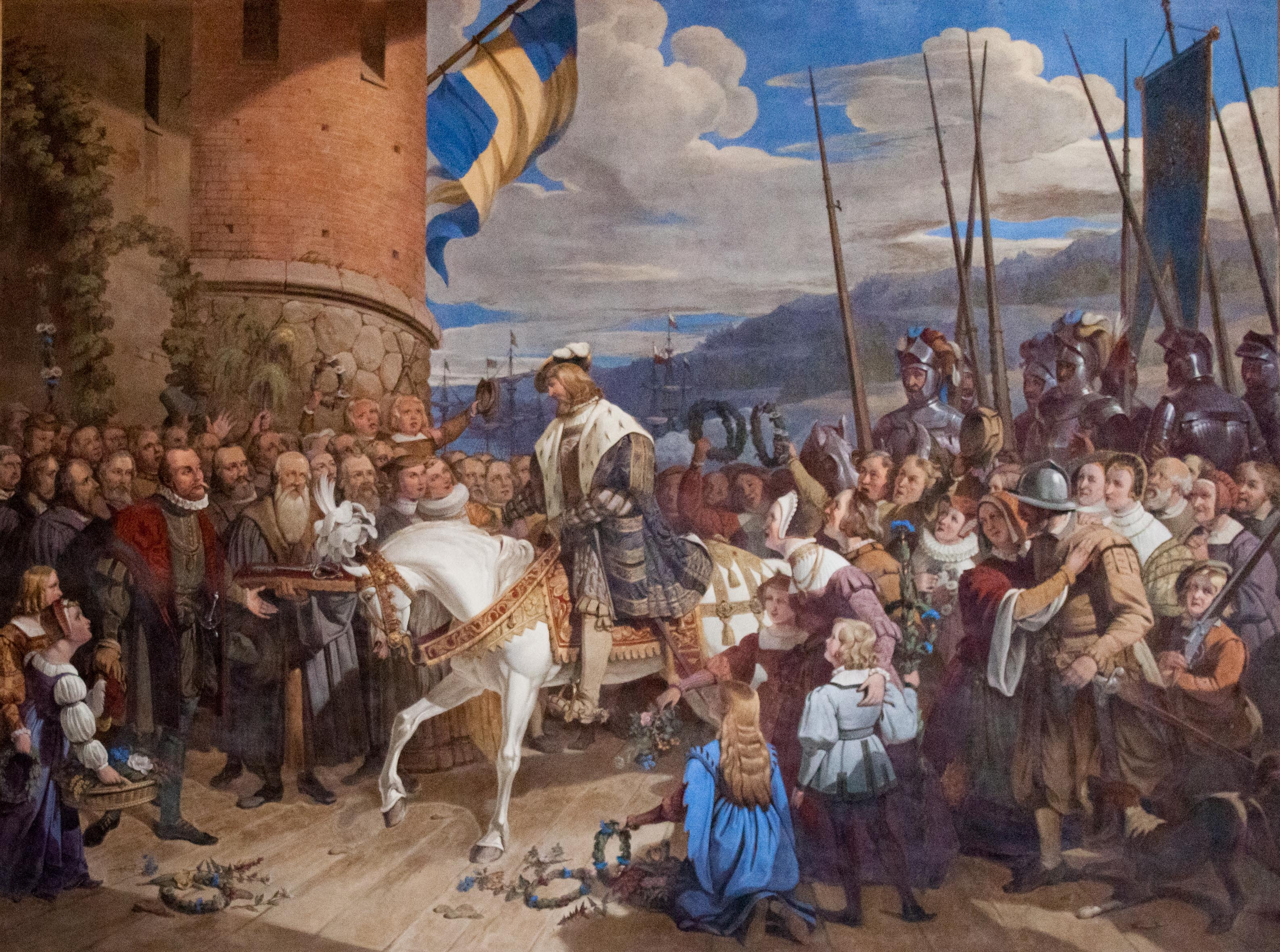

Events from the year 1523 in Sweden

== Incumbents ==
- Monarch: Gustav I (starting 6 June)

== Events ==
- May - The Swedes takes Kalmar from the Danes after the Conquest of Kalmar.
- June - Gustav Vasa is elected King in Strängnäs and the Kalmar Union is thereby formally dissolved.
- June - The city of Stockholm is taken by the Swedes after the Conquest of Stockholm.
- June - Stockholm Castle is taken by the Swedes.
- June - Gustav Vasa make his formal entry to Stockholm and is celebrated as King.
- November - The last Danish-held stronghold in Sweden (with Finland), Viborg Castle, is taken by the Swedes.
