= 1522 in Sweden =

- Decades: 1500s; 1510s; 1520s; 1530s; 1540s
- See also: Other events of 1522; Timeline of Swedish history

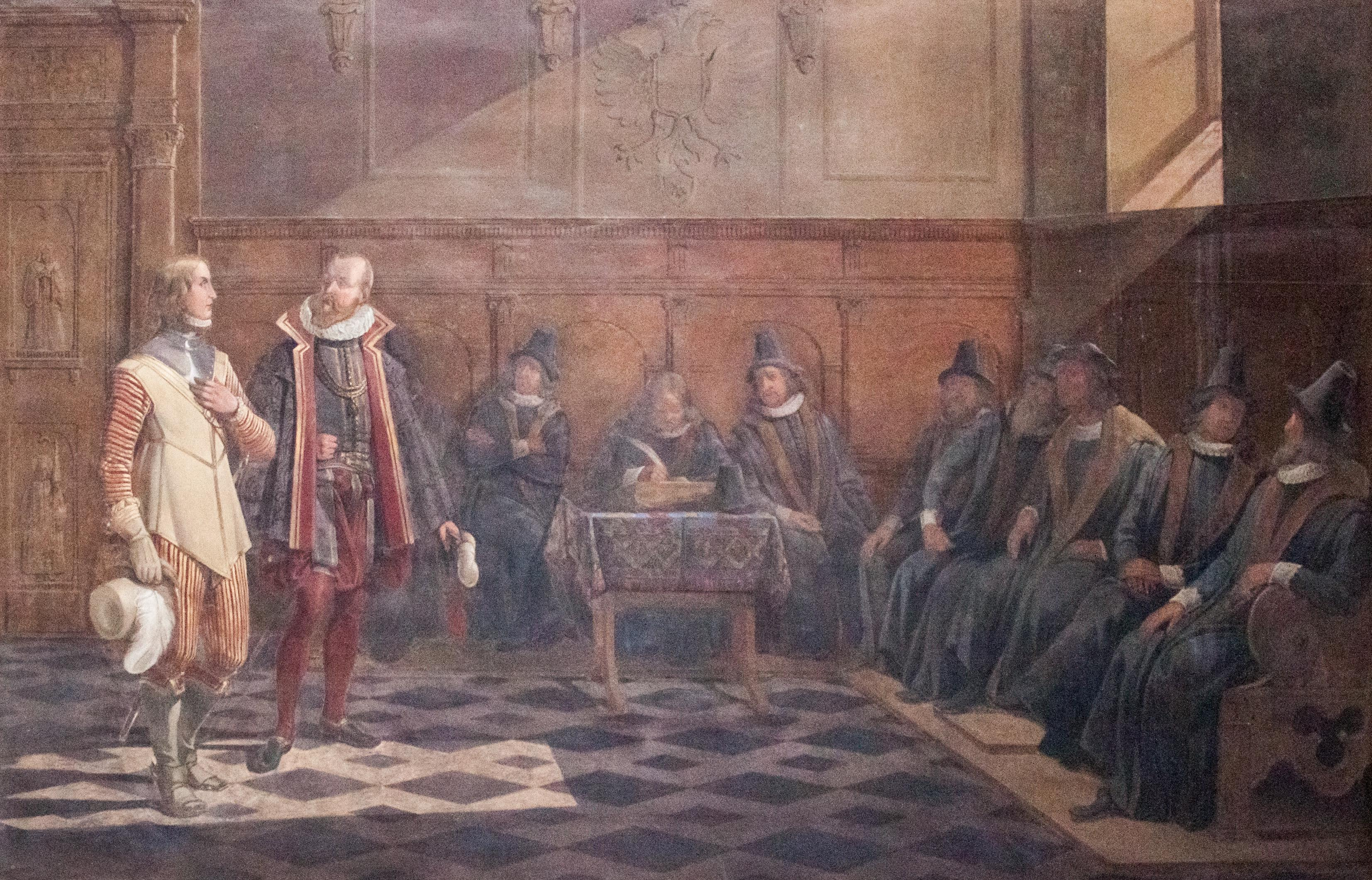

Events from the year 1522 in Sweden

== Government ==
- Christian II
  - Last monarch to hold all three crowns (Denmark, Norway, and Sweden).
    - Reigned as King of Denmark and Norway from 1513 until 1523.
    - He was briefly King of Sweden in 1521.
- Gustavus I
  - Leader of the rebels who begin the 1521 uprising to overthrow Christian II.
  - Controls five Swedish provinces by July 1522.
  - Elected King of Sweden in June 1523.

== Events ==
- - Örebro Castle is taken by the rebels.
- - Västerås Castle is taken by the rebels.
- - The Danish fleet burns Åbo (Turku).
- - The Danish fleet under command of Søren Norby reach the besieged Stockholm.
- - Gustav Vasa makes a treaty with Hanseatic Lübeck and establishes the Swedish fleet.
- - Lübeck declare war against Denmark.
- - Lübeck and Danzig form an alliance with Frederick I of Denmark against Christian II of Denmark.
- - With the assistance of the fleet provided by their Hanseatic allies, the Swedes conquer all the strongholds in Sweden (including Finland) except for Stockholm, Kalmar and Älvsborg.
- - The Swedish fleet rebuff another rescue expedition of Sören Norby to Stockholm.

== Deaths ==
- 22 July - Arvid Kurck, bishop (born 1464)
