= 1582 in Sweden =

- Decades: 1560s; 1570s; 1580s; 1590s; 1600s
- See also: Other events of 1582; Timeline of Swedish history

Events from the year 1582 in Sweden.

== Incumbents ==
- Monarch – John III

== Events ==
=== January ===
- January 17 - Kristinehamn is made a city when Duke Charles (future king Charles IX) issues a royal charter granting town privileges to the city then known as Broo.

=== February ===
- February 6 – Hudiksvall is granted town privileges.

=== Unknown dates ===
- The independence in taxation and granting of privileges given to Duke Charles is reduced by John III through the so-called Statute of Stockholm.
