= 1585 in Sweden =

- Decades: 1560s; 1570s; 1580s; 1590s; 1600s
- See also: Other events of 1585; Timeline of Swedish history

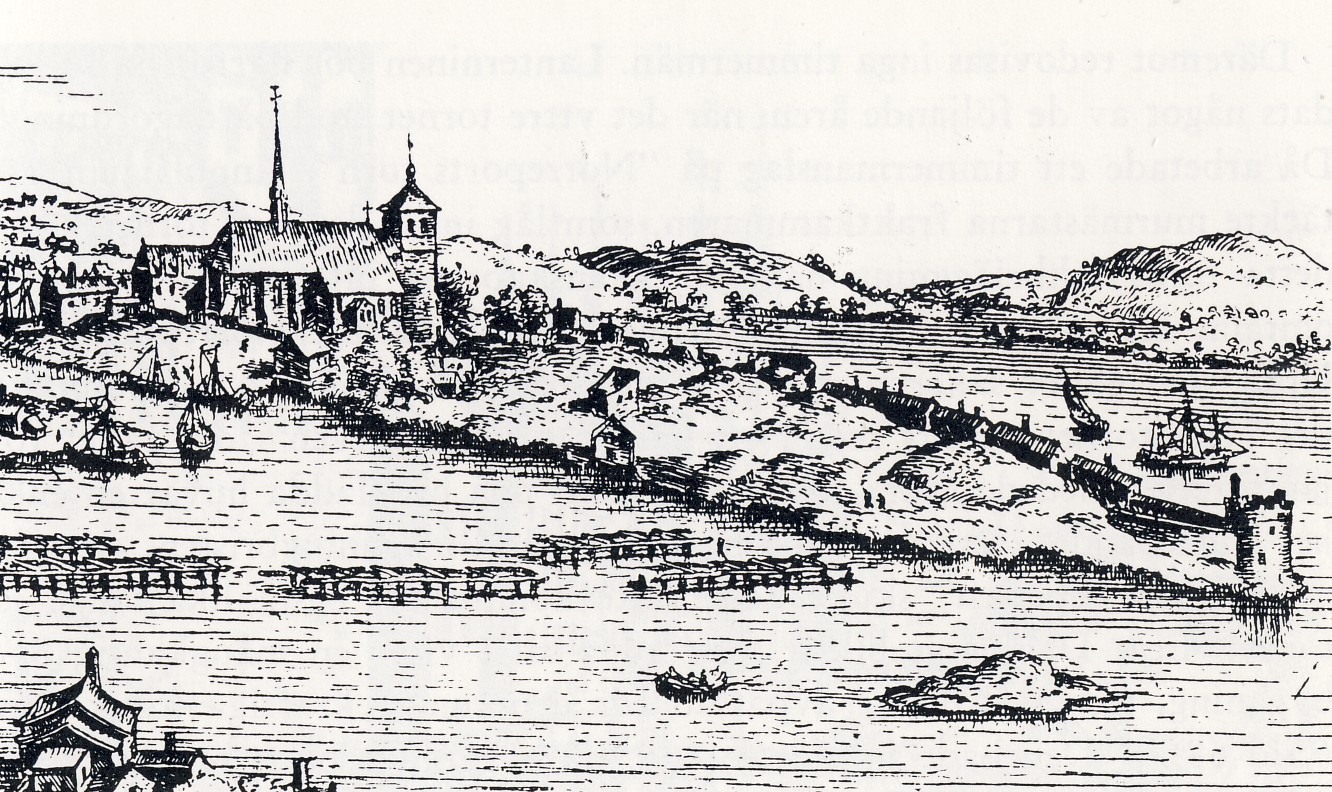
Hogenberg Gråmunkeholmen 1585

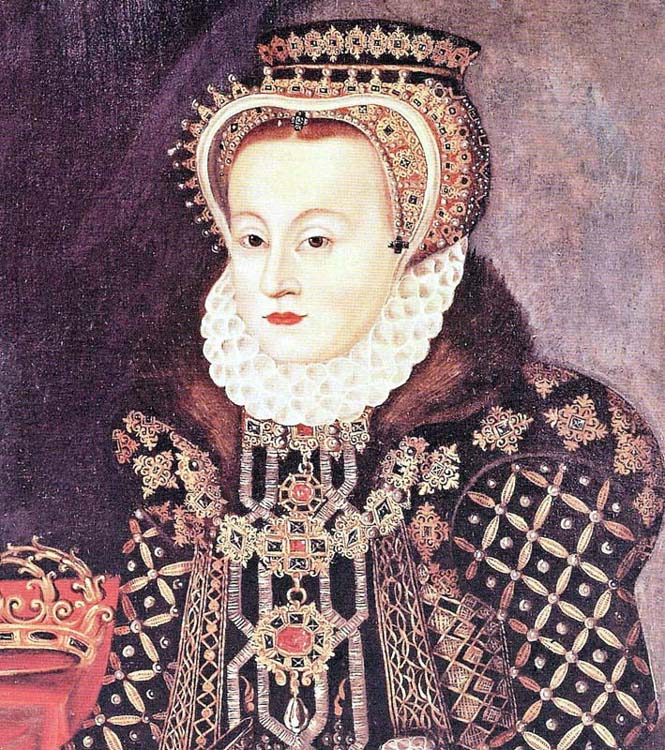
Gunilla Bielke

Events from the year 1585 in Sweden

== Incumbents ==
- Monarch – John III

== Events ==
21st of February – King John III married Gunilla Bielke at Västerås Cathedral. The wedding ceremony was followed by Gunilla's coronation as Queen of Sweden the following day, 22 February. The marriage was controversial, as Gunilla came from the Swedish aristocracy rather than foreign royalty. John III's siblings, including Duke Karl, refused to attend the wedding, further worsening the already tense relationship between the brothers. Gunilla acted as a mediator between the king and the Swedish aristocracy and influenced his religious policies in favour of Protestantism.

11th of March – Härnösands gets town privileges

December – Treaty of Plussa between Russia and Sweden is extended by four years

Oldest preserved Swedish almanac made by Petrus Olai Vadenstensis is from this year

== Births ==
- 14th of February – Marcus Kock, Belgian born Master of Mint for Gustavus Adolphus (d. 1657)
- 11th of June – Evert Horn, Swedish soldier (d. 1615)

== Deaths ==
- 3 April - Gabriel Kristiernsson Oxenstierna, soldier (b. around 1500)
- 5 November - Pontus De la Gardie, general (b. 1520)
- Lucretia Gyllenhielm, illegitimate royal child (b. 1561)
- 6 July - Elisabeth Sabina, child of Charles IX of Sweden (b. 13 March 1582)
- 26 August - Margareta Elisabeth, child of Charles IX of Sweden (b. 24 September 1580)
