= History of Åland =

The history of the Åland Islands spans more than six thousand years, from early human settlement to modern autonomy within Finland. Archaeological finds show that the islands have been inhabited continuously since the Neolithic period. Several Bronze Age sites and six hillforts from the Viking Age have been found on the islands.

Åland came under Swedish rule in the 13th century and remained under Swedish control until 1809, when the Russian Empire annexed both Finland and Åland. During the 19th century the islands were demilitarised and neutralised, and they stayed part of the Russian Empire until Finland declared independence in 1917.

In 1918, during the Finnish Civil War, Swedish and German forces intervened to protect civilians and secure control of the islands. The League of Nations resolved the Åland question in 1921, confirming Åland as part of Finland and granting the islands lasting autonomy while reaffirming their demilitarised status.

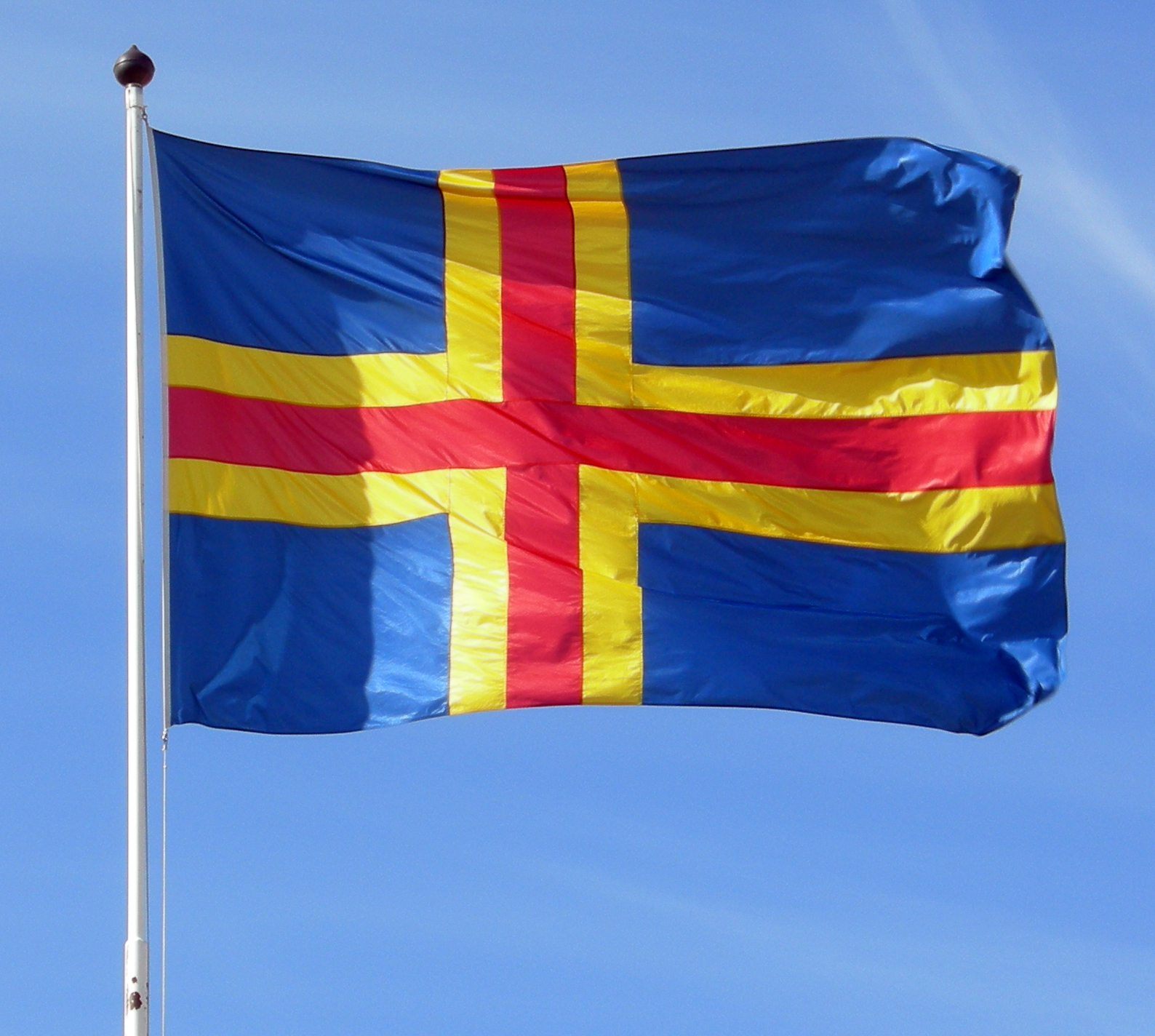
Flag of Åland

== Geological history ==
Åland's geological formation was shaped by repeated glaciations, and post-glacial uplift continues to reshape the archipelago today.

=== Paleolithic period ===
Approximately 18,000 BC, during the Weichselian glaciation, a thick ice sheet covered Scandinavia. The ice receded from Åland around 9000 BC. By 8000 BC, the highest peaks of the emerging archipelago became visible above the Baltic Sea. Sea levels fluctuated as the Baltic basin evolved, but no land bridge connected Åland to the mainland. The first human settlers likely reached the islands by boat or over seasonal ice. Post-glacial rebound continues to raise the land by several millimetres per year, gradually increasing the islands' land area.

== Prehistory ==
The earliest known human activity on the Åland Islands is evidenced by Neolithic and Bronze Age settlements.

=== Neolithic period ===
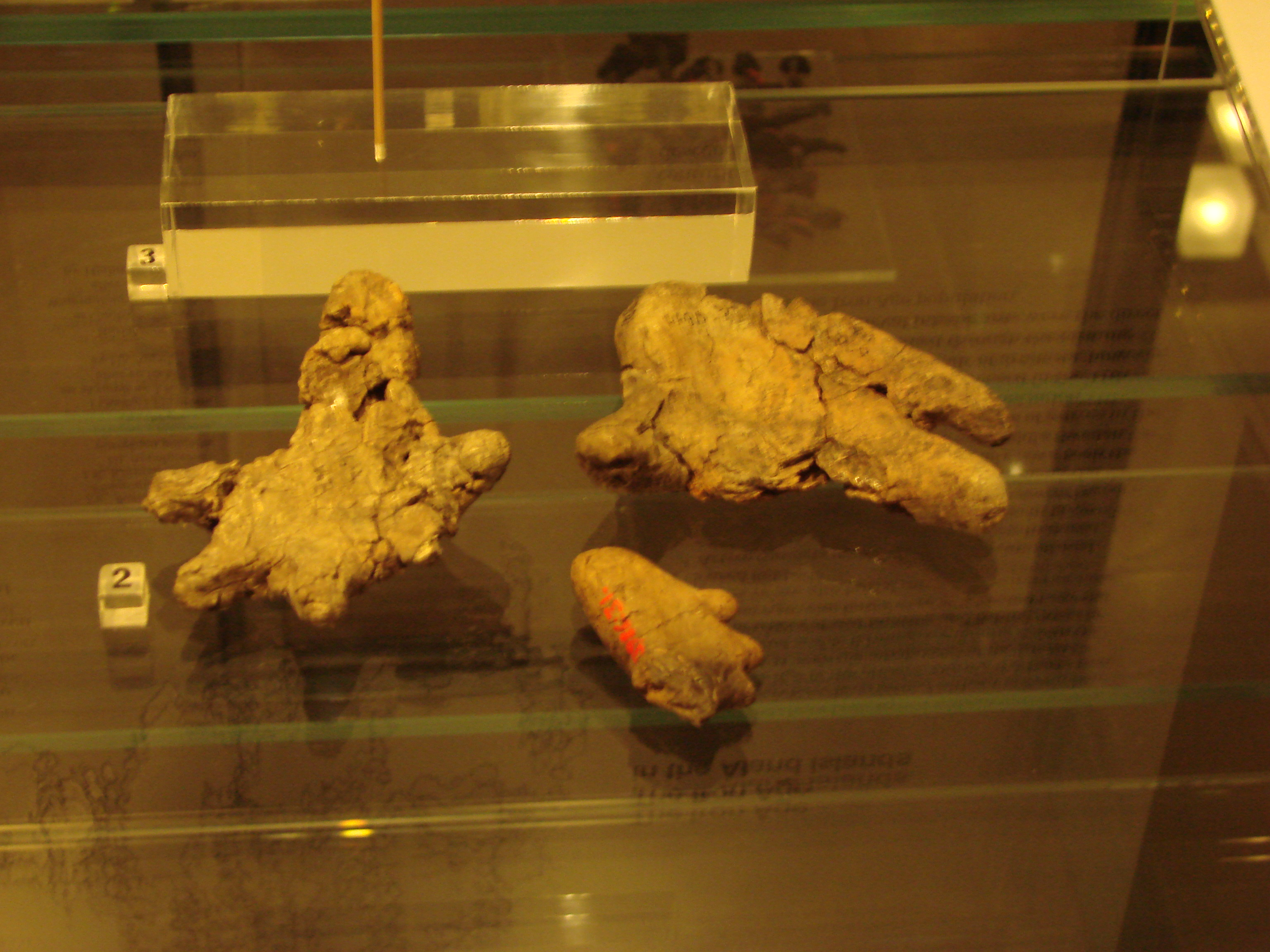
Stone Age clay bear-paw artifacts from Åland.

Human skeletal remains, pottery, and animal bones from the Middle Neolithic (about 4000 BC) provide the earliest evidence of human presence on the islands. These finds are linked to Scandinavian cultures: first the Pitted Ware culture, later the Comb Ceramic culture. Small-scale farming and animal husbandry began during this period. Settlement density increased during the Bronze Age, when several permanent sites were established.

=== Bronze Age ===
Several Bronze Age settlement sites have been identified on Åland. Finds from areas such as Kökar include ceramics, animal bones, and traces of early animal husbandry.

== Middle Ages ==
During the Middle Ages, Åland became part of the Swedish realm and developed permanent settlements, parishes, and early institutions.

The first wooden churches were built on the islands. In the late 14th and 15th centuries, stone churches replaced many of the earlier wooden buildings. The Franciscan order established a Monastery on Hamnö in Kökar during the 15th century.

At the same time, several noble families settled on Åland. Construction of Kastelholm Castle is believed to have begun in the 1380s, and the castle was first mentioned in 1388. In 1397, Åland became part of the Kalmar Union, which united Denmark, Norway, and Sweden under a single monarch.

== Swedish rule ==
After the Middle Ages, Åland came under firm Swedish control and developed closer administrative and economic ties with the Swedish crown.

In 1507, the Danish naval officer Søren Norby captured Kastelholm Castle. Several battles between Danish and Swedish forces took place around the castle between 1521 and 1523. In 1537, Gustav Vasa made Åland a royal castle county and established three breeding farms for the crown. Catholicism ended on Åland as monasteries were closed and church silver was confiscated by the state.

During the 17th century, Åland became more firmly integrated into the Swedish Empire. Many Ålanders were conscripted into Swedish wars, and a permanent Stockholm–Turku mail route was established through the islands. Later in the century, the Kastelholm witch trials led to the execution of more than twenty women. The first school on Åland was founded in Saltvik during the same period.

In the early 18th century, during the Great Northern War, many Ålanders fled west as Russian troops advanced. The Battle of Grengam during the Great Northern War took place near Ledsund on 7 August 1720, which was the last major naval battle of the war. Åland remained under Swedish rule for the following century. During the Napoleonic Wars, Russian forces occupied Åland in 1808 as part of the Finnish War. The following year, the Treaty of Fredrikshamn ended Swedish rule; Finland and Åland were ceded to Russia, marking the end of more than three centuries of Swedish control.

== Russian rule ==
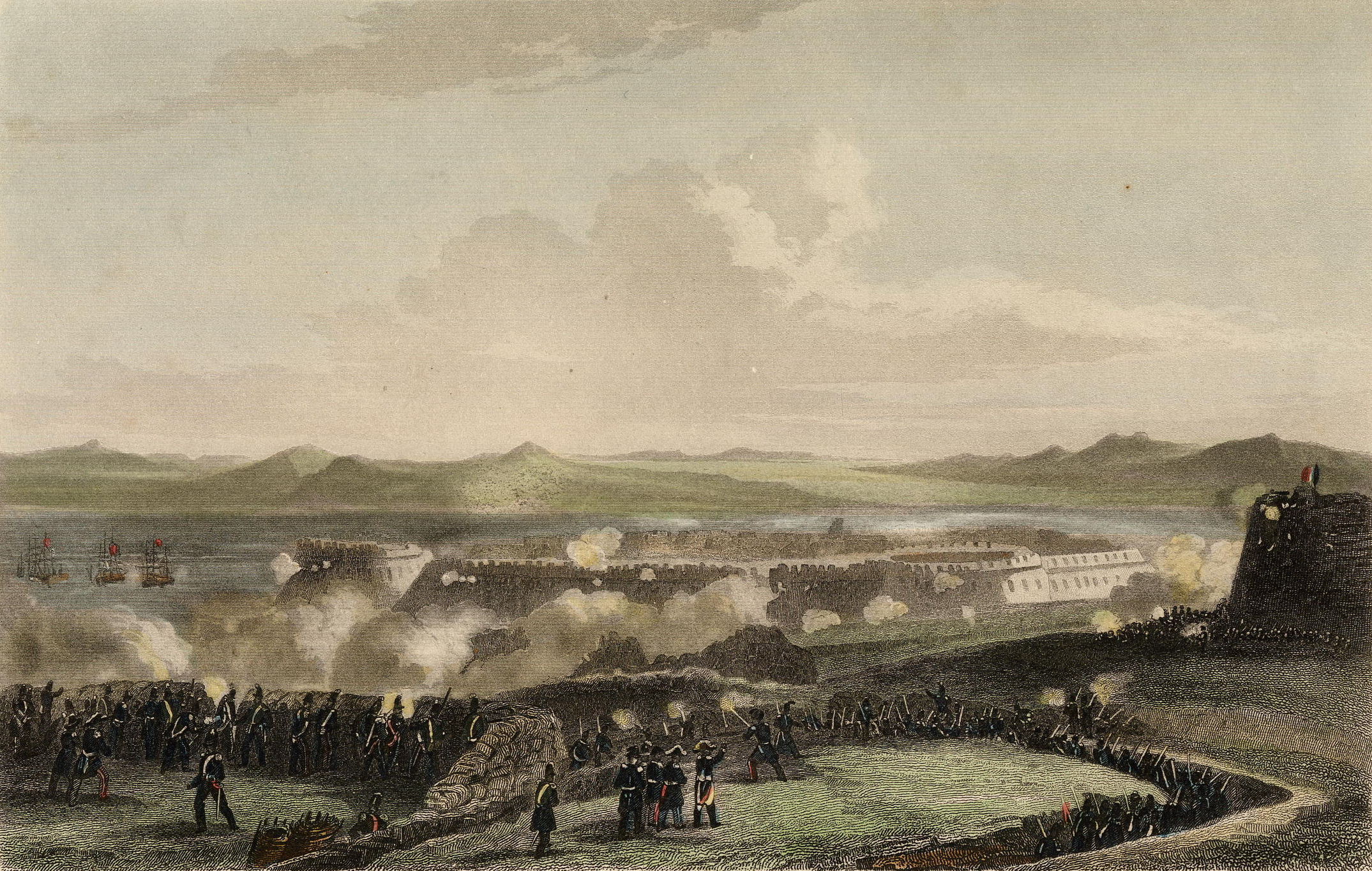
Soldiers in trenches and artillery batteries firing at the Bomarsund fortress during the Åland War (1854)

Following the Finnish War, Åland was incorporated into the Russian Empire in 1809. In 1829, construction began on the fortress of Bomarsund. British Prime Minister Palmerston protested against the fortification, but without effect.

During the Crimean War, the Anglo-French coalition attacked and destroyed Bomarsund in 1854 during the Battle of Bomarsund. After the war, the Treaty of Paris prohibited further fortification of the islands.

Malaria was endemic in Åland for at least 150 years, largely due to the abundance of Anopheles claviger mosquitoes. Severe outbreaks were recorded in the 18th century and in 1853 and 1862. In 1875, Kaj Himberg built his own six-unit code teleprinter which was the first to ever use a six-unit code, one year prior to Émile Baudot.

Several infrastructure and cultural developments took place during Russian rule. A telegraph cable connecting Mariehamn to Nystad was built by The Great Northern Telegraph Company in 1877, with the help of Kaj Himberg. In 1882, Lemström's canal opened to ship traffic, with the work being carried out by inmates of prisons from Finland, and costed 180,000 Finnish markka. The Önningeby artists' colony was established in 1886. The first telephone was installed in Mariehamn in 1892 by Himberg.

A Russian garrison was established in 1906. In 1907, the secret Treaty of Björkö between Russia and Germany gave Russia a free hand to place military forces on the islands. Russia, citing the need to stop smuggling of arms into Finland, stationed significant naval and military forces on Åland, despite the earlier Treaty of Paris.

=== World War I ===
When World War I broke out in 1914, Russia began constructing new fortifications on Åland. Forts were built on Saggö, Börkö, Sålis, Frebbenby, Mellantrop, Kungsö, Korsö, Herrö, Storklobb, and Kökar.

During this period, many Ålanders wished to join Sweden. A referendum on Åland showed that 95% supported unification with Sweden.

After Finland declared independence from Russia in 1917, Finnish troops landed to take control of Åland. Sweden sent troops on 13 February 1918. The Finnish Whites took Boxö and Saggö, while Finnish Reds landed on Åland on 17 February 1918. Fighting took place at Godby between the Whites and Reds, with the Whites prevailing. German forces landed on Åland on 28 February 1918.

== Interwar period ==
In 1918 the islanders internationally pled to reunite with Sweden. In 1919 Sweden brought the question before the Paris Peace Conference on 18 March, but the islands remained part of Finland. Also in 1919, the 1919 Ålandic status referendum took place, where the islanders had an unofficial referendum to integrate into Sweden. In 1921 the Åland convention re-established the demilitarised status of the islands.

== See also ==
- History of Finland
- Battle of Bomarsund
- Kastelholm Castle
- Wikimedia Atlas of Åland
