= Nils Stensson Sture =

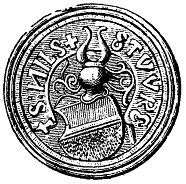
The Dale-Junker's seal, bearing the legend Nils.Stuure

Nils Stensson Sture (1512 – 1526 or 1528) was the eldest son and heir of Sten Sture the Younger. The so-called Daljunkern ('the Dale-Junker', i.e. the junker from Dalarna), the young leader of an unsuccessful rebellion against Gustav Vasa, claimed to be Nils Sture, and it is a much-discussed question in Swedish historiography whether they really were the same person or if Daljunkern was an impostor.

== Biography ==
Nils was the eldest son of Sten Sture the Younger and his wife Kristina Gyllenstierna. Sten Sture ruled Sweden through the 1510s with the title of regent (Swedish: riksföreståndare), but in February 1520 he suffered a mortal wound fighting against Christian II of Denmark at the Battle of Bogesund. Christian subsequently overran Sweden, and the seven-year old Nils was captured by the Danes and held prisoner in Copenhagen.

In 1521 the Swedish nobleman Gustav Vasa led a successful rebellion against the Danes and declared himself King of Sweden. In 1524 Nils was released by the new Danish king, Frederick I, and returned to Sweden. Two years later Nils fell sick with the plague, and was taken to Venngarn in Uppland to be cared for by his mother. According to the official version of events, he died soon afterward.

== Daljunkern ==
In 1527 a rebellion broke out against King Gustav in Dalarna, a conservative district alienated by his attempts to reform the Swedish Church. The rebel figurehead was the so-called Dale-Junker, a young man who claimed to be Nils Stensson Sture. In January 1528 he published a letter declaring his right to the Swedish throne and promising to freedom from taxes for ten years if he became king.

Later that year, Gustav's troops marched into Dalarna to suppress the rebellion, and the Dale-Junker fled to Norway, where he was acknowledged as the legitimate son and heir of Sten Sture the Younger by the authorities, notably Olav Engelbrektsson (the Catholic Archbishop of Nidaros) and Vincent Lunge, the governor of Bergen Castle and leading member of the Norwegian Council of the Realm.

In February 1528, an army of Norwegian troops and Swedish exiles, led by Peder Gröm, invaded Sweden from Norway, but was rapidly defeated by Gustav's forces. The Dale-Junker then relocated from Norway to Germany to seek support there, but was arrested at Rostock. The city authorities, under pressure from King Gustav, executed him in late 1528.

The question as to whether the Daljunker was indeed Nils Sture has been strongly debated. The traditional view, based on the official propaganda of King Gustav and the later House of Vasa, has been that Daljunkern was an impostor, a common farmhand named Jöns Hansson. However, revisionist historians have questioned this consensus, noting that Gustav I did not actually reject Daljunkern's claim to be Nils Sture in his contemporary letters. The historian and author Lars-Olof Larsson has been the leading proponent of the theory that Daljunkern really was genuine Nils Sture.

== See also ==
- Dalecarlian Rebellions
- Sture Family
- Sten Sture the Younger
- Gustav Vasa

== Sources ==
- Harrison, Dick; Eriksson, Bo (2010). Sveriges historia: 1350-1600. Stockholm: Norstedt. ISBN 978-91-1-302439-4.
- Carlsson, Gottfrid (1922). "Wulf Gyler i svensk tjänst". Historisk tidskrift.
- Carlsson, Gottfrid (1949). Peder Jakobsson Sunnanväder.
- Gillingstam, Hans (1952). Ätterna Oxenstierna och Vasa under medeltiden.
- Larsson, Lars-Olof (2002). Gustav Vasa - landsfader eller tyrann?.
- Lindberg, Folke (1942). Historiska studier tillägnade Sven Tunberg.
- Stensson, Rune (1947). Peder Jakobsson Sunnanväder och maktkampen i Sverige 1504–1527.
