= Dano-Swedish War (1512–1520) =

Wars of the Kalmar Union

- Part of Union wars of the sixteenth century
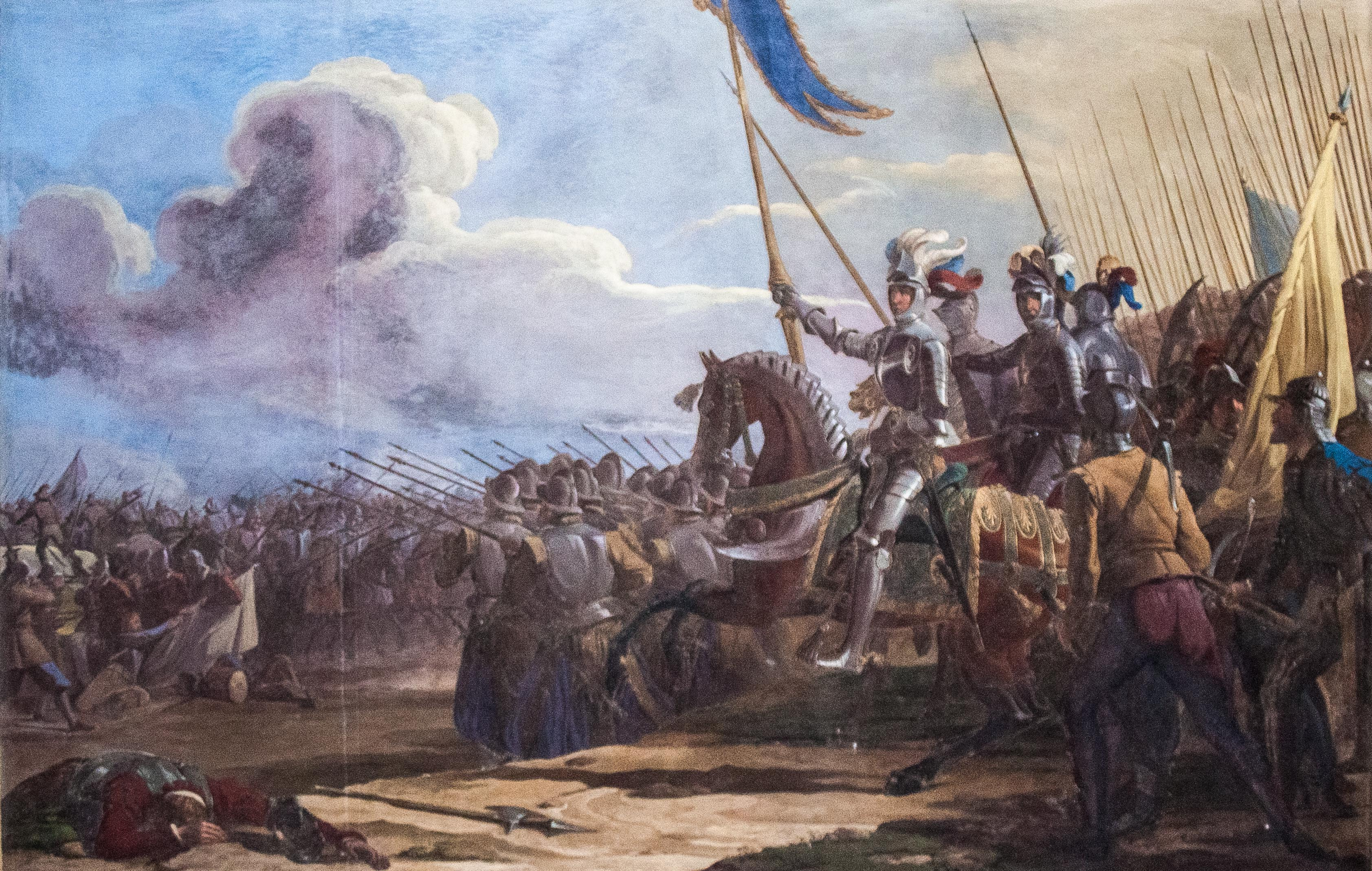
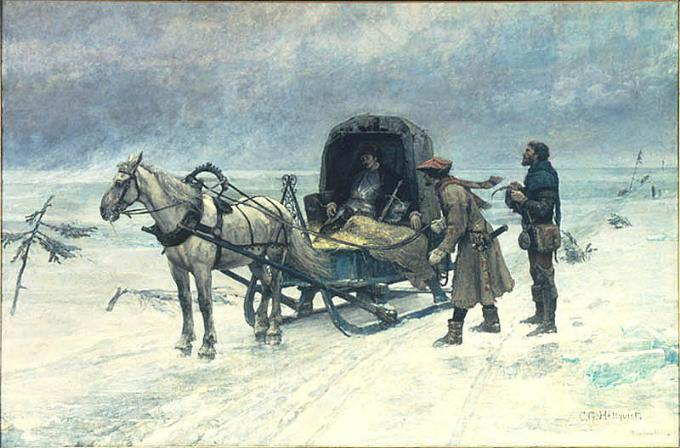
- Top: Battle of Brännkyrka, 27 July 1518; Bottom: Death of Sten Sture the Younger, February 3, 1520
Date	1512 – 1520
Location	Sweden
Result	Danish victory
Territorial changes	Sweden reincorporated into the Kalmar Union

Belligerents
Kalmar Union; Denmark	Sweden

Commanders and leaders
Christian II; Sören Norby; Otte Krumpen	Sten Sture the Younger (DOW); Christina Gyllenstierna (surrendered)

Strength
Unknown	Unknown

Casualties and losses
Unknown	Unknown

The Dano-Swedish War (1512–1520), is the name of the conflict that lasted 1512–1520 and was part of the Union Wars at the time of the Kalmar Union. The war was between the opponents of the union and the Danish king Hans, later against his son Christian II, and ended in 1520 after Sten Sture the Younger died as a result of injuries at Battle of Bogesund and Christian II marched into Stockholm in September of the same year.

== Background ==
When Svante Nilsson died in 1512, his 19-year-old son Sten Sture the Younger took over as Reichsverweser. However, the pro-Danish Riksråd had elected Erik Trolle as Rikspreneur in January but was forced to withdraw that decision because by then, Sten Sture the Younger already had the commoners on his side and controlled most key strongholds.

== War ==
=== 1512–1516 ===
At the beginning of the year 1512, a formal state of war prevailed, but military activity was low. On April 23, 1512, a Treaty of Malmö (1512) was concluded, which was to last until midsummer in 1513. The truce was later extended until midsummer in 1514. The Swedes were faced with two options: either choose the Danish king to the king also in Sweden, or pay an annual tribute to Denmark. None of the alternatives appealed to the Swedes, which is why the issue was delayed, including through a meeting on 29 July 1515.

On February 20, 1513, the Danish king Hans died and was succeeded by his son Christian. Christian had already been elected heir to the throne in Sweden in 1497.

The Danes finally grew tired of the Swedes' procrastination, and in the spring of 1516, began mobilizing for an attack. The attack was to be coordinated with an action against Sten Sture, initiated by his political opponent Archbishop Gustav Trolle, his father Erik Trolle, Sten Kristiernsson and Nils Bosson. The Swedish campaign aimed to put Christian II on the Swedish throne. Opposition leader Gustav Trolle's father Erik Arvidsson had been elected by the Riksdag to be Rikspresenter after Svante Nilsson's death, but the election had thwarted by Sten Sture. This had secured the loyalty of the bailiffs in his father's largest fataburslän Stockholm, Turku, Västerås and Borgholm and tried to confiscate the collected tax. The election of the head of state was postponed until after the peace negotiations with Denmark, in exchange for the board being left to a council committee and for Sten Sture to waive the tax.

=== 1517 ===
In May 1517, the Danish fleet set sail from Copenhagen towards Stockholm. During the journey, Västervik and Stegeholm were attacked, whereby the city was sacked and burned down. Söderköping fire assessment and devastation took place along the Småland and Östergötland coasts. The Danish fleet arrived in Stockholm on 3 August and disembarked at Gärdet. Sten Sture's cavalry met the Danes at Vädla, which resulted in a Swedish victory. The Danish fleet then set sail.

At a national meeting in Stockholm in November, it was decided that Gustav Trolle would be deposed as archbishop and that Almarestäket, which was held by Trolle, would be demolished. It was on this occasion that the bishop of Linköping, Hans Brask, put a note under his seal, the so-called brasklapen. After the deposition as archbishop, Gustav Trolle obtained a papal bull against Sten Sture and the bishop of Roskilde excommunicated him, after persuasion by Christian II.

=== 1518 ===
At the beginning of 1518, Sten Sture sent troops to Västergötland, which were to attack the Danes. However, the Danes managed to avoid battle through negotiations.

On June 6, Christian II set sail with a new army for Stockholm, where they arrived at midsummer. They set up a camp on Brunkebergsåsen, but later moved to Södermalm, where it was easier to defend themselves, but where they could also bombard Stockholm with cannons. Two Danish storming attempts were repulsed, after which Sten Sture decided to attack Christian II's troops from the south. At the end of July there was the battle of Brännkyrka, which was won by the Swedes, however with losses of around 1,600 people.

The Danes retreated to Södermalm, where they were besieged. After six weeks, food shortages caused Christian II to set sail to obtain provisions, but during their attempts to stock up they were attacked by Sten Sture's forces.

Negotiations began at the end of August. Christian II expressed wishes for a personal conversation with Sten Sture in Österhaninge church. As security, a hostage was exchanged from both sides. From the Swedish side, Hemming Gadh, Gustav Eriksson Vasa, Lars Sparre, Jöran Sparre, Olof Ryning and Bengt Nilsson. No conversation took place and the Danes set sail in early October with the Swedish hostage on board.

=== 1519 ===
In January 1519, Christian II's troops entered Västergötland. As revenge, Erik Abrahamsson marched towards northern Halland and Bohuslän. During the summer, battles took place in southern Sweden, among other things Sören Norby attacked Öland and captured Borgholm Castle. A Swedish attempt to retake Borgholm failed, as did the attempt to take Älvsborg.

=== 1520 ===
A strong Danish attack took place in January 1520. From Helsingborg, Danish troops broke into Småland and then moved on towards Östergötland. When news of the Danish attack reached Sten Sture, he marched towards Västergötland, where a defense of Bogesund on lake Åsunden was being prepared.

On January 19, the Danes attacked Sten Sture's positions at the Battle of Bogesund, whereupon Sten Sture was hit by a projectile and fell badly wounded from his horse. After that, the Swedish army was quickly disbanded due to a lack of leadership. On 3 February Sten Sture died as a result of his injuries. The Danish troops advanced further into Västergötland and Bogesund, Falköping, Skövde and Skara were burned.

On March 6, negotiations took place between Otto Krumpen and the Swedish National Council in Uppsala, which resulted in the council swearing allegiance to Christian II.

== Consequences ==
The Swedish peasant armies continued the battles against the Danes, among other things the Danish siege force was attacked at Västerås Castle and on March 29, 1520, the battle at Badelundaåsen took place east of Västerås. On April 6, Uppsala was attacked by a large peasant force, which was reinforced by people from Stockholm. After initial successes for the peasants, the battle ended with a Danish victory.

Christian II started negotiations with the Hanseatic League which supplied Stockholm with provisions, and got it to refrain from helping Sten Sture's followers and stop calling on Stockholm. In May 1520, Christian II came to Stockholm, who was defended by Sten Sture's widow Kristina Nilsdotter. A siege was launched, but it was fruitless. Only after Hemming Gadh went over to the Danish side and began capitulation negotiations with Kristina Nilsdotter on September 2, was Christian II able to march into Stockholm on September 7, 1520.

Two months later, the Stockholm Bloodbath occurred, whereby 80 opponents of King Christian were executed. In December, the first rebellions against King Christian took place and in 1521 the War of Liberation began.

== Sources ==
- Landgrén Lars-Folke, Westerbom Thomas, Lena (2008). Med blod och svärd 1000-1520. Krigen kring Östersjön; 1 (in Swedish). Helsingfors: Schildt. pp. 222–225. ISBN 9789515018205. LIBRIS: 11132856.
- Larsson, Lars-Olof (1997). Kalmarunionens tid: från drottning Margareta till Kristian II (in Swedish). Stockholm: Rabén Prisma. ISBN 91-518-3165-1. LIBRIS: 7408324.
- Sundberg, Ulf (2002). Medeltidens svenska krig (in Swedish) (2. uppl. ed.). Stockholm: Hjalmarson & Högberg. pp. 395–401. ISBN 91-89660-11-0. LIBRIS: 8666286.
