= Battle of Uppsala =

Battle in the Dano-Swedish War

Battle of Uppsala (1520)
- Part of the Dano-Swedish War (1512–1520)
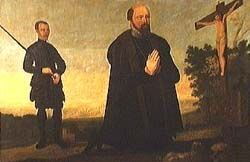
- Danish commander Otto Krumpen
Date	6 April 1520
Location	Uppsala 59°51′29″N 17°38′41″E
Result	Danish victory

Belligerents
Kalmar Union	Sweden

Commanders and leaders
(Kalmar Union) Otto Krumpen	(Sweden) Unknown

Strength
c. 6,000 men	Unknown, but greater than the Danish

Casualties and losses
2,000 men	Greater than the Danes'

The Battle of Uppsala also called the Battle of Good Friday was a bloody battle between the Danish mercenary army and a Swedish peasant army in Uppsala during the Dano-Swedish War (1512-1520). It was the bloodiest battle in the Dano-Swedish war, with casualties in the thousands.

== Background ==
Denmark and Sweden had continued their war after an armistice in 1517. The Danish moved their army up through central Sweden. On January 19, 1520, the Swedish regent Sten Sture the Younger was wounded in a battle with the Danes on the Åsunden ice outside Bogesund. He tried to move back to Stockholm, but died of his injury’s two weeks later. On Good Friday of the same year, the Danish forces were stationed in Uppsala awaiting orders to attack Stockholm. In March 1520, an agreement was concluded between the Swedish council and the Danish commanders, where it was concluded that Christian II would become king of Sweden in return for granting amnesty to Sten Sture's followers. However, Christina Gyllenstierna, Sten Sture's widow, refused to give up and she took over the leadership of the resistance against Christian II. She and her followers still controlled Stockholm and important Swedish castles. The Danish troops were prepared to take Stockholm. In April 1520, the Danes were in Uppsala, while Swedish troops gathered in Västerås with support from Dalarna and Stockholm.

== Battle ==
The Danish army was mostly made up of highly trained and well armed mercenaries from France, Scotland and Germany, which gave the Danes an advantage from the start. The Swedish army was made up of poorly equipped peasants. An estimated 7,000 people participated in the battle.That gave the Danes an advantage from the start. But the Swedes compensated for this with the terrain. On the morning of Good Friday, April 6, the Swedes attacked the Danish forces in Uppsala. The Swedes assumed that the Danish commanders were in the church at mass and that their troops were unprepared. The Swedes attacked the city from the northwest, west and south, but it is not certain exactly where the battle took place. Good Friday 1520 brought a heavy snowfall which made it difficult for the Danes, who at first had difficulty organizing themselves. The guns misfired and their horses slipped.The Swedes first managed to push the Danes back. But instead of holding their positions, the Swedes began looting and ravaging the city, which gave the Danes time to regroup and gather for a counterattack and defeat the Swedish peasant soldiers.

== Aftermath ==
On Easter Eve 1520, Uppsala's population, which at the time consisted of roughly 2,000 people woke up to wailing and death. The Danish casualties amount to about 2,000. The Swedish casualties are unknown.

Christina Gyllenstierna claimed the battle to be a Swedish victory. Christian II wrote to his north German relatives that the Swedes had lost 12,000 men. Both statements cannot be seen as reliable, since propaganda during the war was widespread. The memory of the battle is partially overshadowed by the drama surrounding Stockholm bloodbath that took place later in autumn that year.

== 2001 excavation ==
In 2001, workmen making improvements to a road uncovered a mass grave containing some of the thousands who fell at the Battle of Uppsala. Archaeologists went on to recover the remains of about 60 men aged in their 20s and 30s. Their skulls and bones had cut marks showing where they had been struck by swords and other weapons. The grave contained some whole skeletons, while others were reduced to random limbs and articulated sections, as well as co-mingled remains of multiple individuals tossed together. From what the archaeologists could observe 52 skulls, 60% showed evidence of sharp force trauma, from these, they averaged about 2.7 wounds per person. Some heads had as many as 5 cuts, implying that they could have been outnumbered, that the Danes were very angry and went for overkill, and/or that the Swedes had little to no protective headwear.
