= 1561 in Sweden =

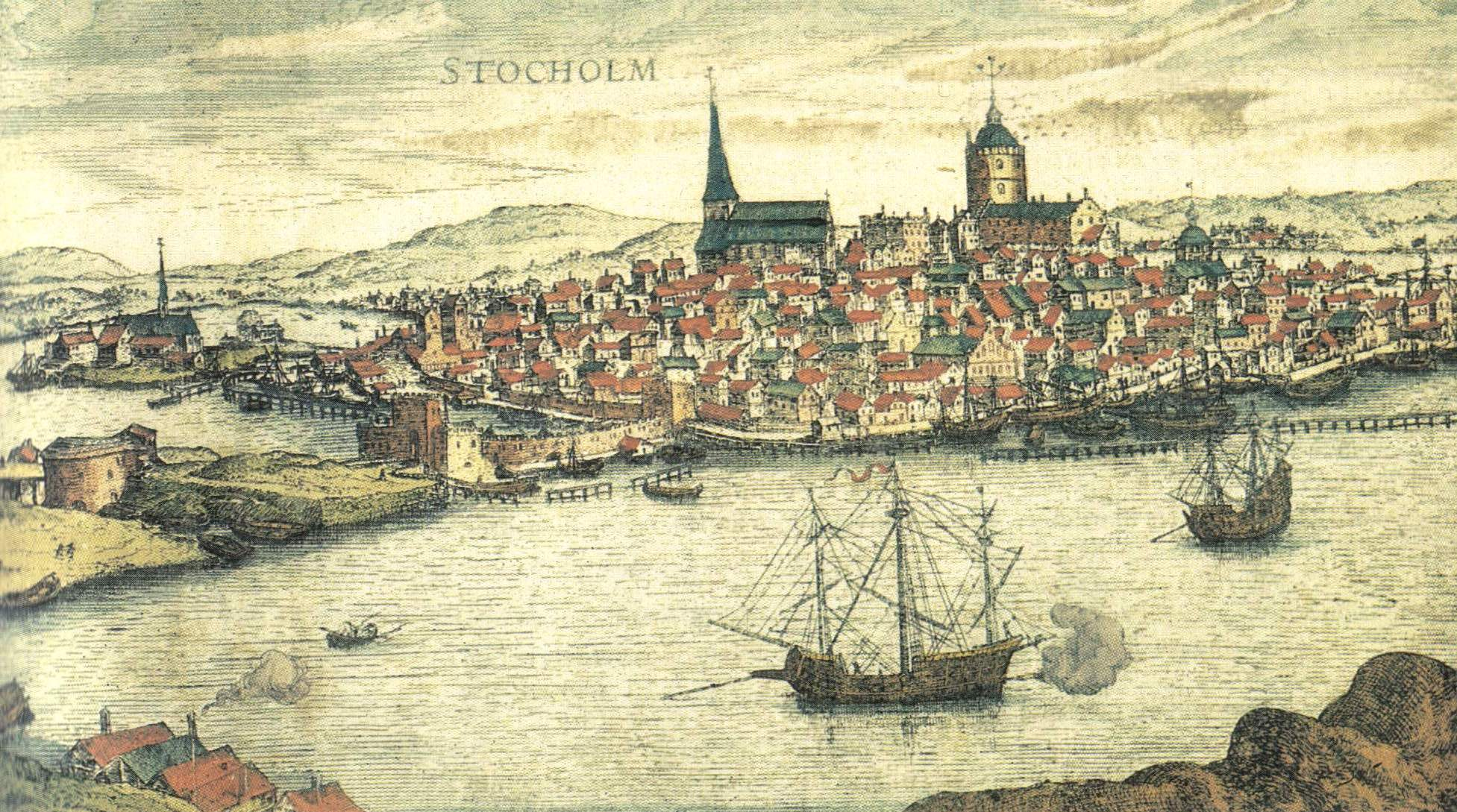
Stockholm 1560s copperplate Frantz Hogenberg

Events from the year 1561 in Sweden

== Incumbents ==
- Monarch – Eric XIV

== Events ==
- 1 March - Inauguration of the Kullen Lighthouse.
- 14 April - The Arboga artiklar regulates the power within the Swedish duchies, limiting the political power of the King's brothers.
- May - The King creates the Höga nämnden, a private court of the King.
- June - Swedish Estonia is created.
- 29 June - Coronation of Eric XIV. The hereditary titles friherre (Baron) and count are introduced in Sweden.
- - Swedish patrol boats patrols the Östersjön to protect ships from pirates.
- - A law on inns are proclaimed in which the hosts are instructed to keep sufficient supply for humans and horses and the prices are regulated.

== Births ==
- - Lucretia Gyllenhielm, illegitimate royal daughter (died 1585)
- 24 July - Maria of the Palatinate
