= 1545 in Sweden =

Events from the year 1545 in Sweden.

== Incumbents ==
- Monarch – Gustav I

== Events ==
- Vadstena Castle is built.
- Olaus Magnus represents Sweden at the Council of Trent.
- The last note in the Diarium Vadstenense.

== Births ==
- Princess Anna Maria of Sweden, (died 1610)
- Valborg Eriksdotter, royal mistress (died 1580)
