= 1593 in Sweden =

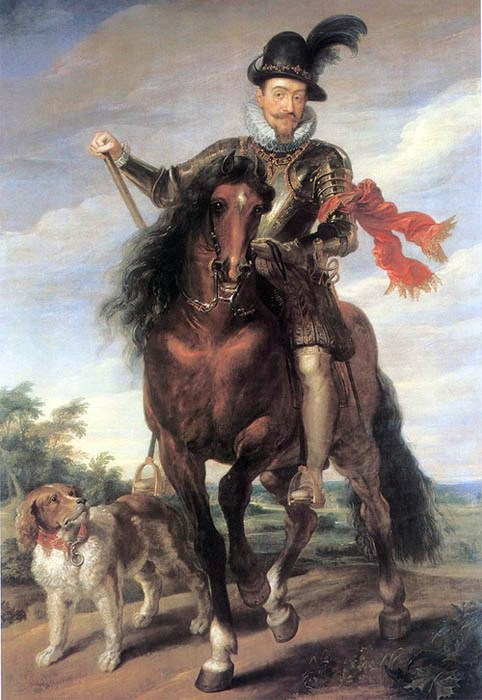
Sigismund at horse

Events from the year 1593 in Sweden

== Incumbents ==
- Monarch – Sigismund

== Events ==
- March - The Uppsala Synod introduce the confession of faith and ends the Liturgical Battle.
- A decision to re-open the Uppsala University is taken.
- The new King arrives in Sweden from Poland.

== Births ==
- Torsten Stålhandske

== Deaths ==
- 3 June - Katarina Bengtsdotter Gylta, abbess (born 1520)
