= 1555 in Sweden =

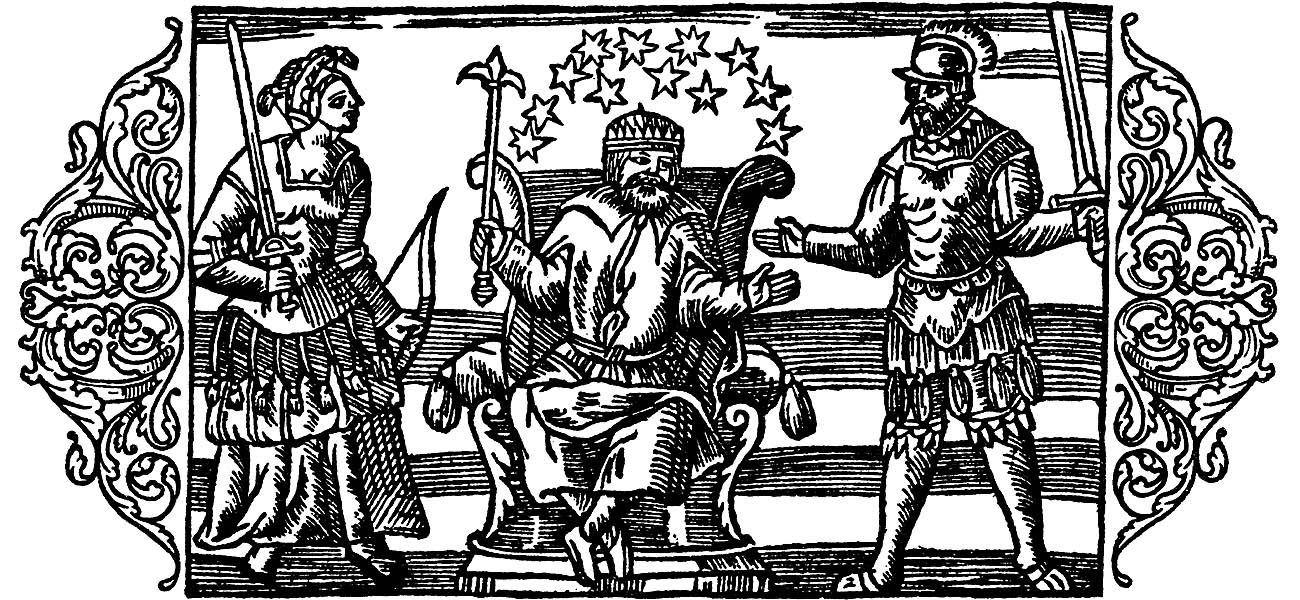
"On the three Main Gods of the Geats." From left to right; Frigg, Thor and Odin.

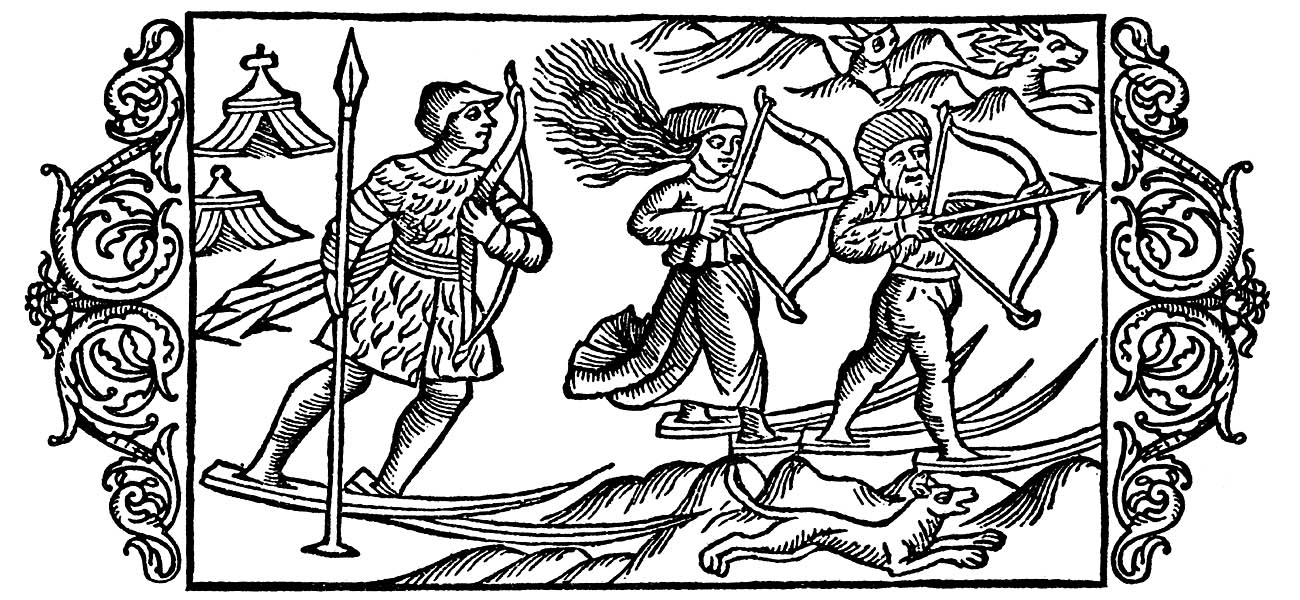
Olaus Magnus - More on the Location and Nature of the Land of the Skrickfinns

Events from the year 1555 in Sweden

== Events ==
- The population of the Swedish province of Finland was instructed to receive training in national defense against Russian incursions.
- A Description of the Northern Peoples, written by Bishop Olaus Magnus, was printed in Rome in 1555.
- 11 March - The Russo-Swedish War (1554–57): the Russian Empire breaks its 1537 treaty by attacking Sweden, which results in the Russian defeat at the Battle of Kivinebb.
- 30 May - King Gustav Vasa introduced mandatory internal passports.

== Births ==
- Axel Kurck, colonel (died 1630)
- Petrus Kenicius, Archbishop of Uppsala (died 1636)

== Deaths ==
There are no widely documented notable deaths in Sweden for the year 1555.
