= 1584 in Sweden =

Events from the year 1584 in Sweden

== Incumbents ==
- Monarch – John III

== Events ==
- Duke Charles retracts the charter and town privileges granted to Bro (what is today Kristinehamn) two years earlier.

== Births ==
- 10 November - Catherine of Sweden, Countess Palatine of Kleeburg, princess (died 1638)

== Deaths ==
- 15 January - Martha Leijonhufvud, politically active countess (born 1520)
