= Finnish campaign (1523) =

1523 campaign of the Swedish War of Liberation

- Part of the Swedish War of Liberation
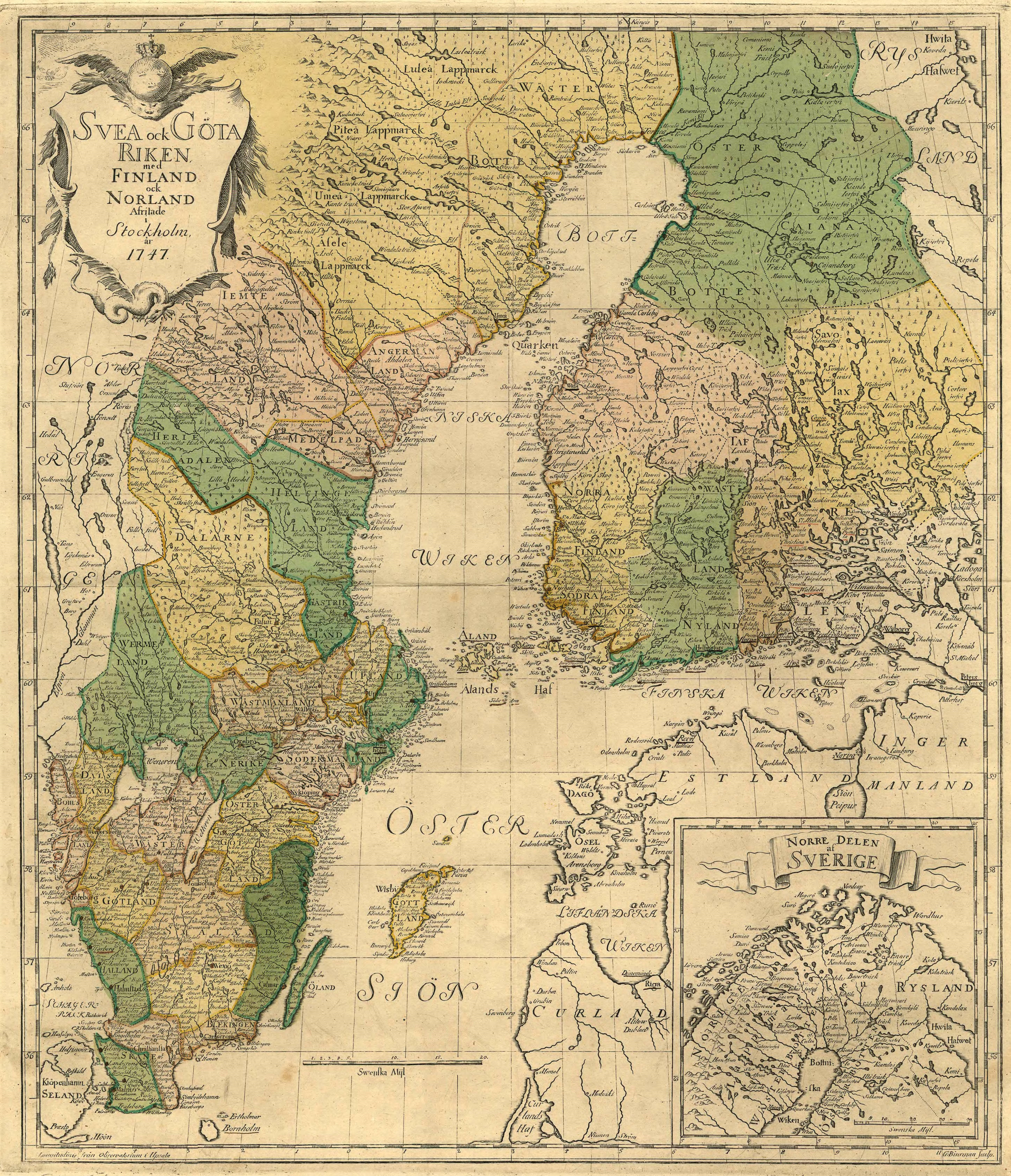
- A map of Sweden and Finland in 1747
Date	August–October 1523
Location	Finland
Result	Swedish victory
Territorial changes	Finland is conquered by the Swedes

Belligerents
Sweden	Kalmar Union; Denmark

Commanders and leaders
Erik Fleming; Ivar Fleming; Vieregk; Nils Grabbe	Søren Norby; Rolef van Leveren; Junker Moritz (surrendered); Tile Giseler

Units involved
Unknown	Kastelholm garrison Åbo garrison Viborg garrison

Strength
2,000 men 400 cavalry	c. 2,000 men 10 ships

Casualties and losses
Unknown	Unknown

The Finnish Campaign was a successful campaign under Erik Fleming, Ivar Fleming, Nils Grabbe, and a certain Vieregk to liberate Finland from Danish control during the Swedish War of Liberation.

== Background ==
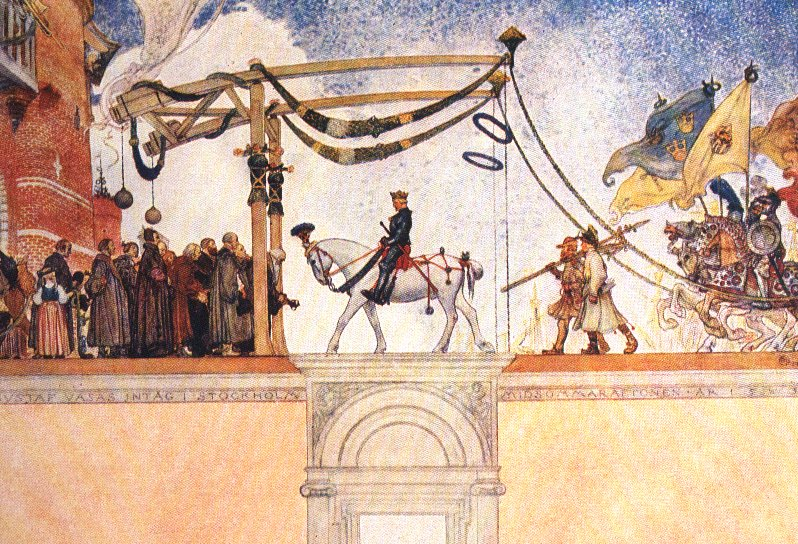
The Entry of King Gustav Vasa of Sweden into Stockholm

=== Gustav Vasa's election as king ===
On 6 June, the Swedish Estates gathered in Strängnäs. The representatives were peasants, miners, burghers, the council, and a large portion of the nobility. Bered von Melen, along with two observers from Lübeck, Berut Bombouwer, and Hermann Plonnies were present as well. At first, Gustav Vasa was hesitant about his ability to be the king, however, after speaking with members of his council and the Germans, Gustav preceded with his election.

He was proclaimed the king of Sweden and took his oath of office the same day. Previously, on 22 May, Søren Norby had arrived in Finland with around 2,000 men and 10 ships.

== Campaign ==
In August, an army of 2,000 men and 400 cavalry under the command of Erik and Ivar Fleming, Vieregk, and Nils Grabbe was sent to Finland to liberate it from Danish control. At Åbo, Junker Moritz would resist the Swedes so seriously that it developed into a battle. The battle ended with a decisive victory for the Swedes, with Åbo being taken on August 10 and its castle and Junker capitulating after a two-week long siege. Erik Fleming also stormed and captured Kustö Bishop's Castle. After its submission to the Swedes, Erik Fleming stayed in western Finland and handed over supreme command to Ivar Fleming. In September, Erik and Ivar Fleming had taken control of most of Finland except Viborg and Olofsborg, however, these would later capitulate after Ivar signed the conditions for their surrender in October.

== Aftermath ==
Because of the campaign, all pro-Danish forces in Finland were successfully driven out by the Swedes, and as a reward for his services, Erik Fleming was appointed as a Councillor in 1523 and later in 1525 as a lawman in Söderfinne Lagsaga.
