= Battle of Brännkyrka =

Battle in the Dano-Swedish War

- Part of Dano-Swedish War (1512–1520)
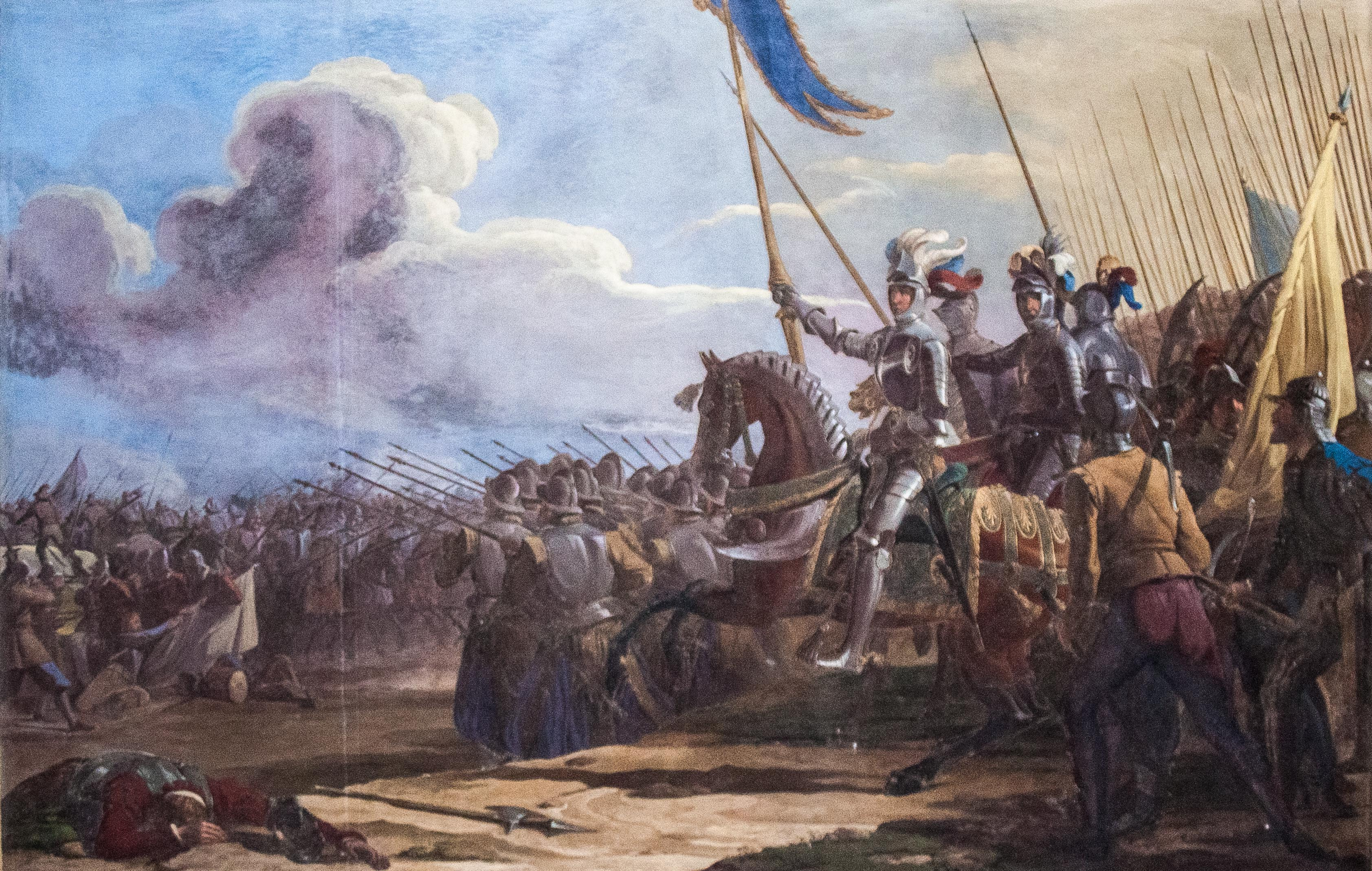
- A fresco depicting the battle in Vasa Choir in Uppsala Cathedral
Date	27 July 1518
Location	Disputed
Result	Swedish victory
Territorial changes	Union troops retreat to Södermalm

Belligerents
Kalmar Union; Denmark	Kingdom of Sweden

Commanders and leaders
(Denmark) Christian II	(Sweden) Sten Sture the Younger

Casualties and losses
Hundreds captured	~1,000 killed

The Battle of Brännkyrka took place on 27 July 1518 in Sweden, during a Swedish uprising against the Danish dominance in Kalmar Union, between Danish forces and Swedish rebel troops. The battle resulted in decisive Swedish victory.

== Background ==
On the Summer of 1518 the Danish king Christian II started a siege of Stockholm in an attempt to quell the rebellion of the party of Sten Sture the Younger, regent of Sweden. With an army, mostly composed of Danish troops and reinforced by German mercenaries, he firstly camped on Norrmalm, but later moved to Södermalm. In July, Sten Sture the Younger advanced from the south along with an army to break the siege. Christian's troops then took the siege off and marched southwards to meet the approaching Swedish forces.

== Location ==
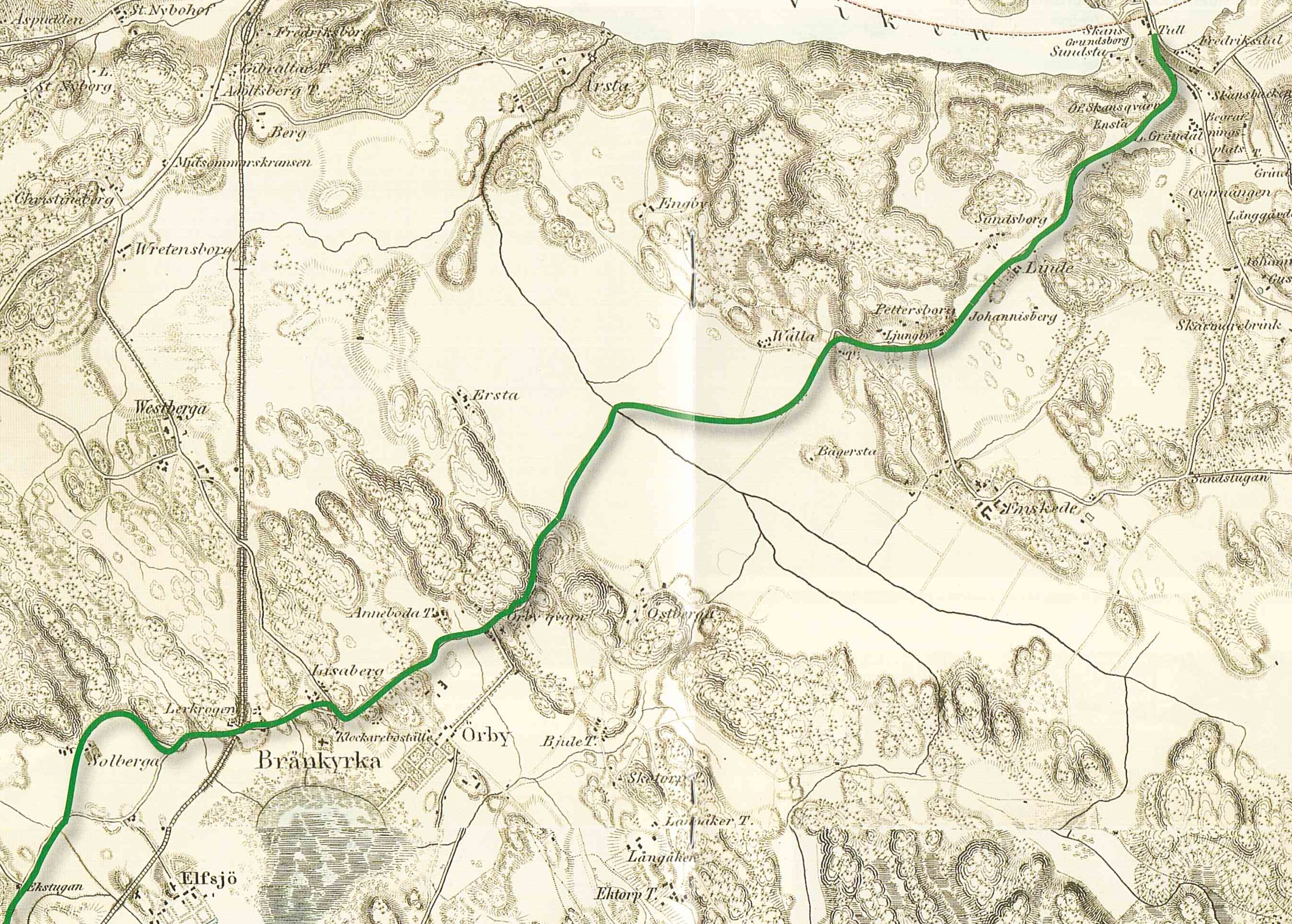
A map dated by 1861 of the area with the Göta highway depicted.

The main sources of the Battle of Brännkyrka is an account in Latin of a Danish eyewitness, Lars Werman (Lawrence Wermannus), and one in German by a man in Sten Sture’s service. None of them mentions Brännkyrka. It is however, mentioned in later sources: Olaus Petri, Peder Svart, the Great Swedish historical chronicle (Stora rimkrönikan) and others.

Werman doesn't specify the exact location of the battle but mentions the place had mountains and hills overgrown with bushes on the left side and on the right side there were swamps and fences. The German narrative reports ene schermüslinth by Aerstede op eyne enge, "a skirmish at Aerstede in a meadow". In a note in Latin that says Annerstedt Aerstede refers to Årsta farm and therefore the battle should have taken place at Årstafältet between Årsta yard and Brännkyrka church. The historian Sigurd Rahmqvist believes that Aerstede refers to Ersta, a farm that no longer exists, but that laid west of Årstafältet, northwest of Göta highway. This would indicate that at least the concluding part of the battle took place on the slope towards Årstafältet between Östberga and Ersta, just to the north of Örby mill.

The Great Swedish historical chronicle states instead that the battle was fought near Brännkyrka church where it was said were found the traces of what was then assumed to be remnants of the Swedes' camp.

Taking into account the circumstances preceding the battle, that Sten Sture's troops marched towards Stockholm from the South and Christian's ones from his camp on Södermalm to meet them, makes a location along the Göta highway a likely place for the skirmish. This is consistent with the above sites, also located around the same site: Brännkyrka church, Örby mill and southern slopes towards Årstafältet. Valla field which are also listed as a possible site is a direct continuation of the northern slope towards Årstafältet.

A number of other places have also been suggested. One theory is that the battle was fought at Victory Memorial (Sigridsmynde), between Brännkyrka and Huddinge churches.

== Battle ==
No reference to the battle were made by the contemporaries but it was mentioned in Swedish and Danish sources several years later.

=== According to Swedish sources ===
Swedes attempted the attack first during the daylight but the Danes were alerted by a sentry located around Långbro gård, Älvsjö so the attack failed. Consequently, the Danish army attacked the southern flank but the Swedes repelled the attack and eventually broke through their defense line. This coincided with the appearance of Swedish reinforcement as a part of the foot soldiers that were not yet involved into the battle and who intervened in the attack. In result the Danish front was dissolved and fled. During the escape Danish heavy cavalry was caught in the swamps. Sture took 300 prisoners with him in Stockholm. It is reported that 1600 farmers have remained on the battlefield.

It was believed that Gustav Vasa held the Swedish banner during the battle but this is now contested. On the other hand, he possibly participated in the battle, at least he was shortly afterwards among Sten Sture's troops.

=== According to Danish sources ===
The Danish historian Professor Allen writes: "The first Swedish attack was repulsed and at the second they were thrown away and was chased into the woods. During the persecution the Danish troops were disordered and divided into small clusters. Swedes took advantage of the situation. Under the coverage of the woods they gathered again and broke unexpectedly into a single attack. Danes could not withstand due to the disordered state, whereby they were. Especially the German soldiers were driven out in a quagmire or marsh, and found their death over there. The Danes retreated to Södermalm."

== Aftermath ==
After the battle the Danes withdrew to their camp on Södermalm. After that negotiations were started and an agreement was reached on September 12, 1518 to set up a treaty for a new meeting in July 1519. After that Christian sailed away with the hostages he had before the negotiations.

The Swedish troops managed to capture hundreds of Union troops, at the cost of at least 1,000 of their own being killed.

== References in arts and literature ==
The Peder Svart's chronicle, written upon Gustav Vasa's request, gives the battle a major role in Gustav Vasa's life. And while the fact that he hold the Swedish banner during the battle is now considered as less likely, the battle is still represented as the first significant achievement of his.

In the Vasa Choir of Uppsala Cathedral there are seven frescoes painted by Johan Gustaf Sandberg between 1831 and 1838 that depict important events in Gustav Vasa's life, where the painting of the Battle of Brännkyrka with Gustav Vasa in the background is the first.

There are multiple references to the battle in literature where it is represented as a major event in Gustav Vasa's life. As well as in poetry and folk songs. One of the earliest references in 1800s it is mentioned in Geijer and Afzelius, Swedish Folk Songs in 1880, that begins with Swerighis menn achtar iagh att loffwa.
