= 1583 in Sweden =

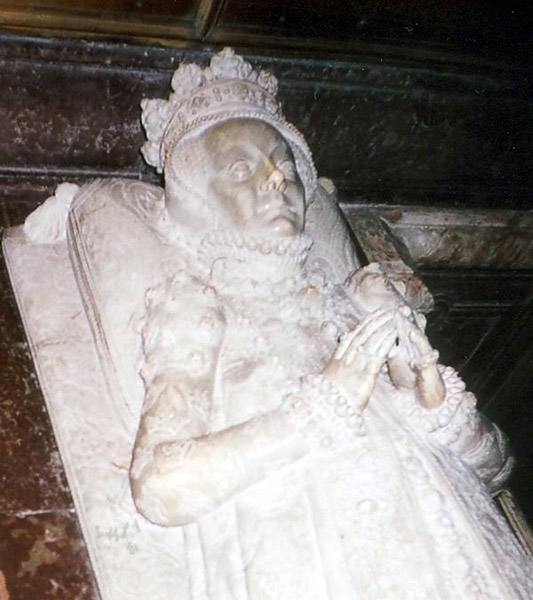
Catherine's tomb

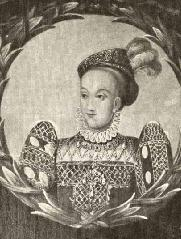
Sofia Gyllenhielm

Events from the year 1583 in Sweden

== Incumbents ==
- Monarch – John III

== Events ==
- 10 August - The Livonian War is ended by the Treaty of Plussa.
- - Creation of the - Diocese of Mariestad
- - A new sumptuary law bans the use of velvet for hats and jackets and silk skirts for women not belonging to the nobility.
- Jean Allard began negotiations with Henry III of France with the aim of overthrowing King John III of Sweden.

== Births ==
- 16 June - Axel Oxenstierna, statesman (died 1654 in Sweden)
- 20 June - Jacob De la Gardie, statesman and soldier (died 1652 in Sweden)

== Deaths ==
- 16 September - Catherine Jagiellon, queen (born 1526)
- - Sofia Johansdotter Gyllenhielm, illegitimate royal daughter (born 1556)
