= 1636 in Sweden =

Catherine of Sweden, 1630s

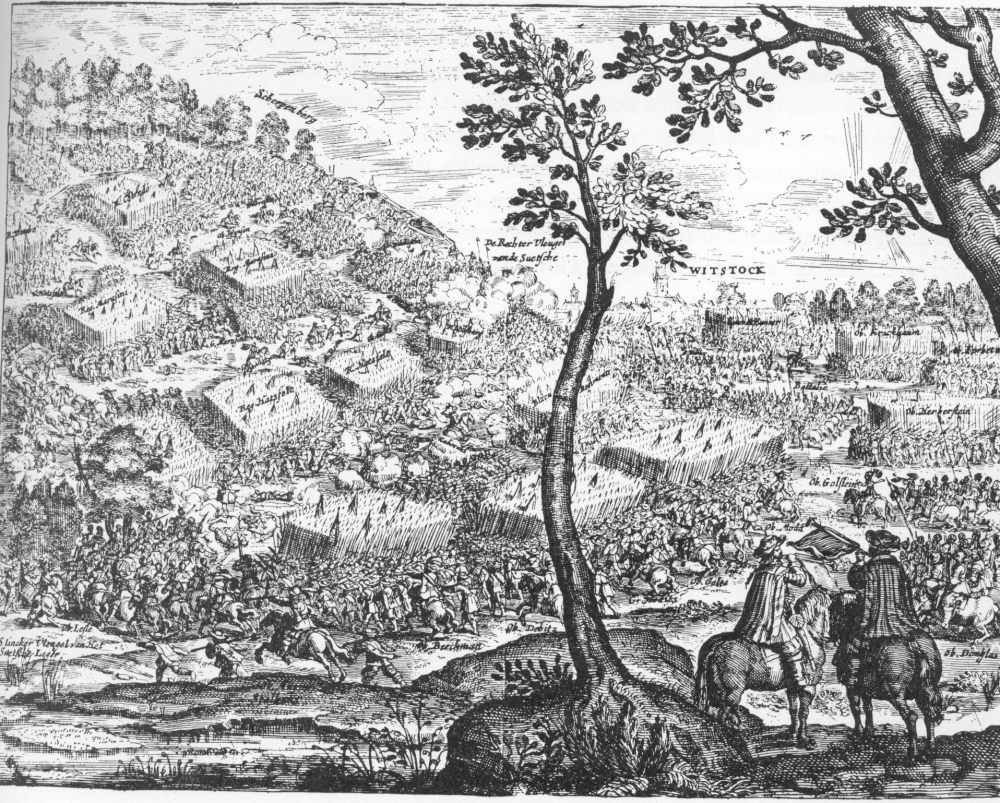
The Battle of Wittstock 1636

Events from the year 1636 in Sweden

== Incumbents ==
- Monarch – Christina

== Events ==
- Posten AB was established as Kungliga Postverket (The Royal Postal Agency).
- Axel Oxenstierna return to Sweden.
- Battle of Wittstock
- All cities north of Stockholm and Åbo (Turku) are prohibited from foreign trade.
- Establishment of the Nya smedjegården.
- Treaty of Wismar

== Births ==
- Queen Maria Eleonora of Brandenburg (1599–1655), the wife of Gustavus Adolphus, was prominent in Swedish history, but she died later, in 1655.
- March 24 - John Casimir of Sweden (1631–1665), John Casimir was the son of King Gustavus Adolphus and Maria Eleonora of Brandenburg.

== Deaths ==
- February 3 – Petrus Kenicius, archbishop (born 1555)
- Euphrosina Heldina von Dieffenau, royal governess and courtier (born unknown year)
- Johannes Messenius, historian, dramatist and university professor (born 1579)
