= Danish attack on Åland (1507) =

1507 attack on Åland

- Part of the Dano-Swedish War of 1501–1512
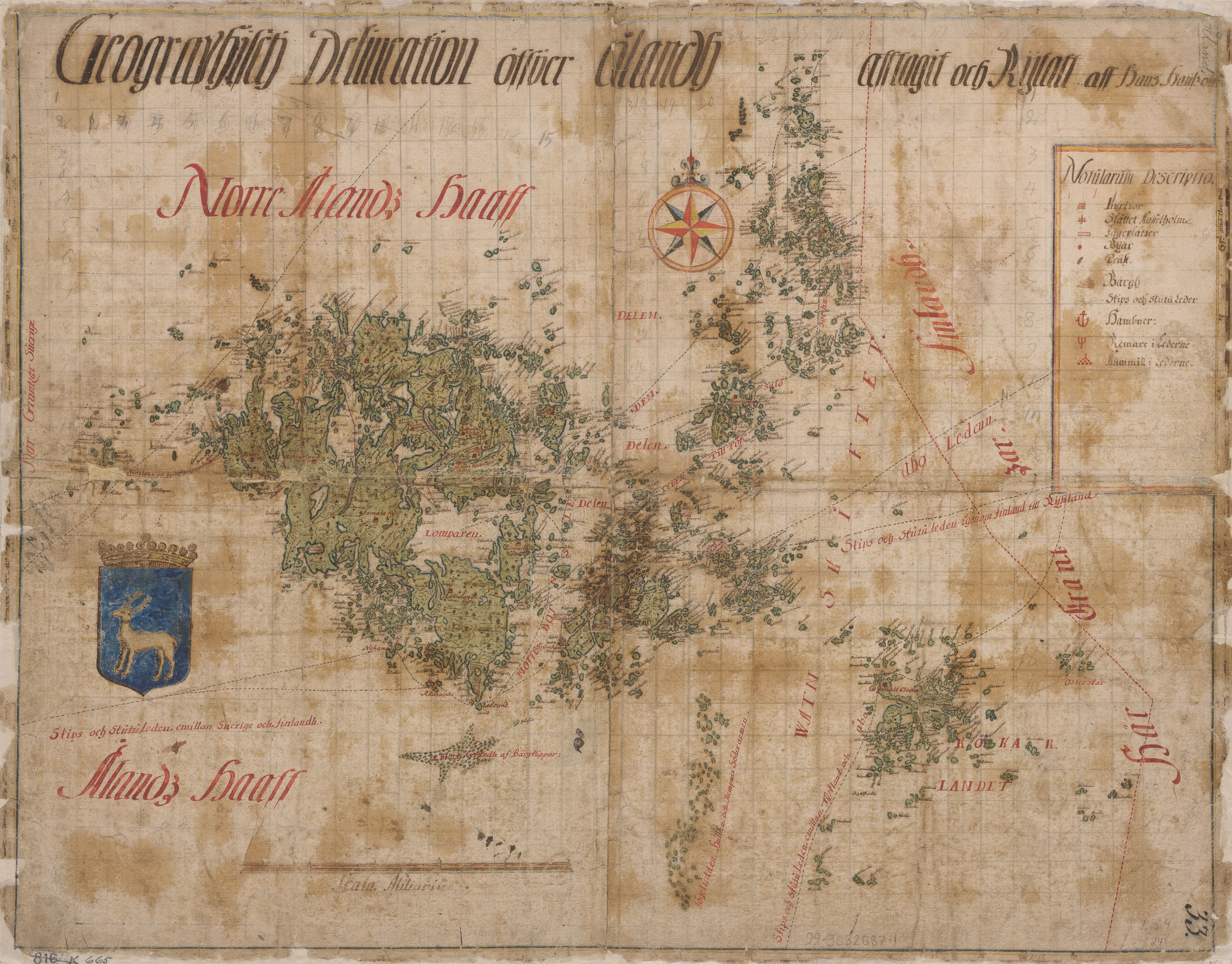
- Map of Åland made prior to 1667 by Hans Hansson
Date	July 1507
Location	Åland, Sweden
Result	Danish victory
Territorial changes	Kastelholm is razed by Danish forces

Belligerents
Sweden	Denmark

Commanders and leaders
Sten Turesson (POW)	Søren Norby

Units involved
Kastelholm garrison	One squadron

Strength
Unknown	9 ships

Casualties and losses
Several captured	Unknown

The Danish attack on Åland occurred during the Dano-Swedish War of 1501–1512 in July 1507, when Søren Norby attacked the island with a squadron of nine ships. He besieged Kastelholm, eventually forcing it to capitulate and bringing its commander Sten Turesson along with others back to Copenhagen. The Danes also forced the island to pay 1,500 marks in brandskattning (Ransom) and several villages were razed.

== Background ==
In early May 1507, four Danish ships arrived outside Stockholm, raiding parts of it. In the Gulf of Finland, two other Danish ships with 60 crew had made sailing there dangerous, having captured 12 ships off Nargö in the spring. During the capture of these ships, Hans von Eken jumped into the water and managed to save himself.

== Attack ==
On July 21, a Danish squadron of nine ships under the command of Søren Norby arrived off Åland, and there was little hope of the Swedes being helped by Viborg. Sten Turesson held command over the island's main castle, Kastelholm. However, he had not held the position for long, and his stockpiles were running low. Instead, he requested that his brother come to the rescue since Norby's forces were plundering the countryside. Unfortunately for Turesson, the request did not arrive to Viborg until 21 July. While the message was in transit, Kastelholm had already been captured, plundered, and razed after a brief defense, with Sten Turesson, his wife, and others being captured. Turesson was later blamed for this as Svante Sture believed he had a small garrison and blamed him for not putting up a better defense. Around 1/8 of Åland's farms had been burned, and the rest were forced to pay a brandskatt (ransom) of 1,500 marks.

== Aftermath ==
News of the attack quickly reached Stockholm and Åbo, and people from both sides came and provided assistance. This was made easier after Norby's fleet left.

== Works cited ==
- Styffe, Carl Gustaf [in Swedish] (1884). Sverige under de yngre Sturarne, särdeles under Svante Nilsson, 1504-1520 [Sweden under the younger Sture's, especially under Svante Nilsson, 1504-1520]. Bidrag till Skandinaviens Historia ur utländska arkiver (in Swedish). Stockholm: P.A. Norstedts och söner.
- Hildebrand, Hans (1879). Sveriges medeltid kulturhistorisk skildring [Cultural and historical depiction of Sweden's Middle Ages] (in Swedish). P.A. Norstedts och söner.
- Carlsson, G. (1924). "Sten Turesson (Bielke)". sok.riksarkivet.se. National Archives of Sweden.
- Starbäck, Carl Georg [in Swedish] (1885). Berättelser ur svenska historien: Medeltiden. II. Kalmare-unionen [Stories from Swedish history: The Middle Ages. II. The Kalmar Union] (in Swedish). P. O. Bäckström.
- Schybergson, M.G. [in Swedish] (1887). Finlands historia [Finland's history] (in Swedish). Helsinki: G.W. Edlund.
