= Dalecarlian rebellions =

16th century rebellions in Sweden

A map of Dalarna.

The Dalecarlian rebellions (Swedish: Dalupproren) were a series of Swedish rebellions which took place in Dalarna in Sweden: the First Dalecarlian Rebellion in 1524-1525, the Second Dalecarlian Rebellion in 1527–1528, and the Third Dalecarlian Rebellion (also known as the Bell Rebellion) in 1531–1533. The rebellions were conducted by the peasantry of Dalarna against the Swedish monarch, King Gustav Vasa. Mutual reasons for all three rebellions were loss of support of Gustav I among the Dalecarlian peasantry because of the economic crisis, the increased royal power, and the unpopular Swedish Reformation.

== First Dalecarlian Rebellion ==
Economic crisis occurred after the Swedish war of liberation because of the trade monopoly the king had granted the Hanseatic Lübeck in exchange for their support in recapturing the capital during the war. The discontent was used by two Catholic priests, former Bishop Peder Jakobsson of Västerås, a follower of Sten Sture the Younger, and Knut Mickelsson, who opposed the inclinations of Lutheranism which the king had displayed as early as 1524, who stirred up the emotions against the king and for the Sture family in the province. In the spring of 1525, the Dalecarlians held a meeting and wrote a letter in which they complained of the foreign bailiffs and the imprisonment of Sten Sture's widow Christina Gyllenstierna, and stated that they would renounce their fealty unless their demands were met. They reportedly contacted Søren Norby, who offered Christina marriage. The king managed to subdue the discontent by promising to meet their demands in May 1525, and the leaders fled to Norway. They were extradited in 1526, and executed through breaking wheel in February 1527.

== Second Dalecarlian Rebellion ==
In 1527, the continuing discontent over the economic crisis, a new tax on Lübeck, and the Swedish Reformation, which was launched that year, unleashed the second rebellion in Dalarna, centered around the so-called Daljunkern (The Youngster from Dalarna), who had come from Norway claiming to be Nils Stensson Sture, son of Sten Sture the Younger and Christina Gyllenstierna. This resulted in a feud between the Dalecarlian parishes, which were divided between their loyalties toward the king and the Sture family. The king called representatives of the rebels to negotiations in Uppsala in May 1527, and kept ongoing contacts with them. The Daljunkern left for Norway, but continued to support the rebels from there. In February 1528, the king led an expedition to the Tuna parish, summoned the peasantry at the church, and declared them rebels and outlaws with no right to decide whom to be monarch, and gave them the choice to present all taking part of the rebellion, or else all in the parish were to be executed. This resulted in the rebels being brought forth and executed on the spot, until the king decided for the end of the bloodbath and accepted to show mercy to the remaining rebels. In April, one of the leaders, Peder Grym, was publicly executed in the capital.

== Third Dalecarlian Rebellion ==
In 1531, the Reduction of Gustav I of Sweden of the ongoing Swedish Reformation and a new tax, where every parish were obliged to contribute with one of their church bells, resulted in a rebellion where rebels from several of the parishes killed and abused the kings bell collectors. In May, they offered to pay the worth of the bells in money, which the king accepted. At that point, Christian II of Denmark was attempting to regain his throne, and the king was occupied elsewhere. In January 1533, he was free to deal with the rebellion. He summoned the Dalecarlians to a meeting, where he met them with an army, threatened them, fined them, extradited the bell tax with force, and arrested several of the leaders, Måns Nilsson, Anders Persson, and Ingel Hansson, and took them to the capital, where they were executed in early 1534.

== See also ==
- Dalecarlian Rebellion (1743)
- Westrogothian rebellion

== Sources ==
- Daluppror i Nordisk familjebok (andra upplagan, 1906)
