= 1525 in Sweden =

Events from the year 1525 in Sweden

== Incumbents ==
- Monarch – Gustav I

== Events ==
- - The marriage of the reformer Olaus Petri: on this occasion the mass is celebrated on the Swedish language for the likely first time.
- - Bishop Hans Brask publicly condemns the teachings of Luther in Linköping, which spreads the ideas of the reformation.
- - The King confiscate and dissolves the convent in Mariefred.
- - The first of the Dalecarlian Rebellions.

== Deaths ==
- Date unknown - Anna Eriksdotter (Bielke), war heroine (born 1490)
