= 1526 in Sweden =

Events from the year 1526 in Sweden.

== Incumbents ==
- Monarch – Gustav I

== Events ==
- The New Testament and a psalm book is published in the Swedish language by Olaus Petri.
- Kungliga Hovkapellet
- The King demands confiscation of clerical property.
- The German Melchior Hoffman holds apocalyptic sermons in the German congregation in Stockholm.
- The King sends a monk from Vadstena Abbey to mission Christianity among the Sami.
