= 1579 in Sweden =

Events from the year 1579 in Sweden.

== Incumbents ==
- Monarch – John III

== Events ==
- Princess Cecilia of Sweden is exiled to Germany.

== Births ==
- Johannes Messenius, historian, dramatist and university professor (died 1636)

== Deaths ==
- Laurentius Petri Gothus, Lutheran Archbishop of Uppsala (birth year unknown)
