= 1524 in Sweden =

Events from the year 1524 in Sweden

== Incumbents ==
- Monarch – Gustav I

== Events ==
- – The Protestant reformer Olaus Petri begins his sermons in Stockholm.
- – The first of the Dalecarlian Rebellions occurs, staged by the deposed bishops Peder Sunnanväder and Knut Mikaelsson, and supported by Christina Gyllenstierna and Berent von Mehlen.
- 11 September – Treaty of Malmö signed with Denmark–Norway, ending the Swedish War of Liberation.

== Deaths ==
- 24 March – Ingrid Persdotter, potentially fictitious nun famed for her love letters
