= 1556 in Sweden =

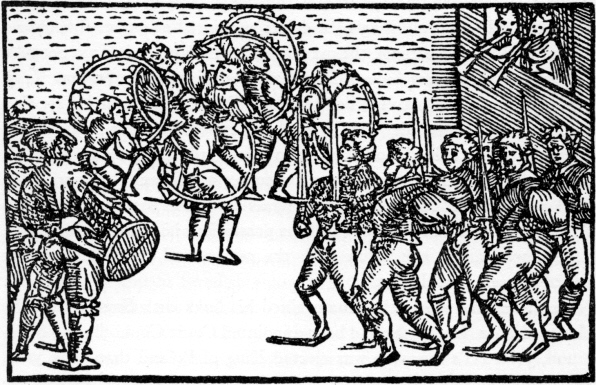
Olaus Magnus Sword dance

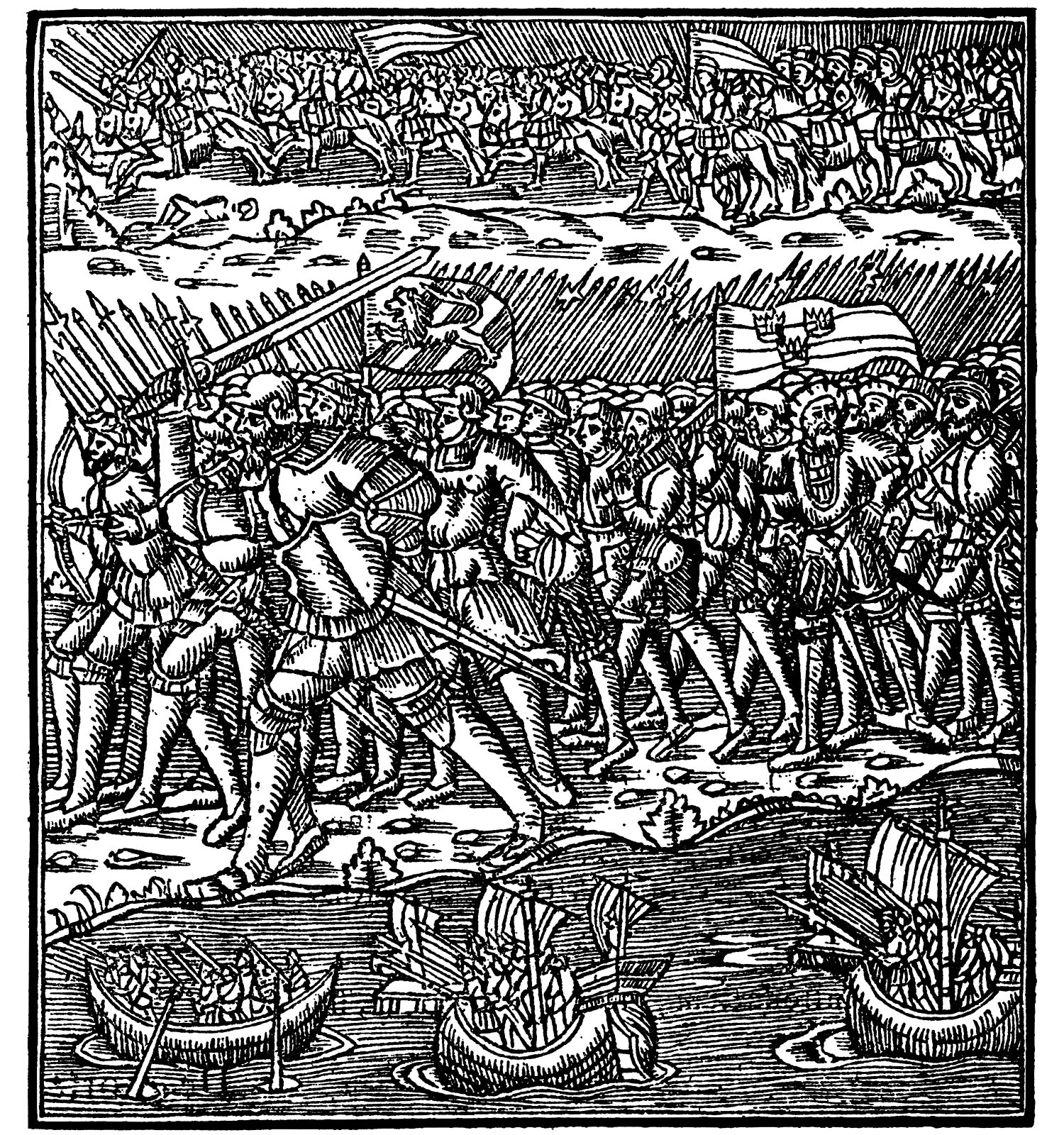
War Between Swedes and Danes - Olaus Magnus 1555

Events from the year 1556 in Sweden

== Incumbents ==
- Monarch – Gustav I

== Events ==
- 10 January - Breeding farms for cattle and horses are introduced by decree of the monarch.
- 25 January - A Russian attack on Viborg is repelled.
- 21 March - Armistice between Sweden and Russia i Käräjäkallio.
- 29 June - Prince John establish himself as the ruler of his Duchy of Finland.
