= Otte Krumpen =

Danish bureaucrat (1473–1569)

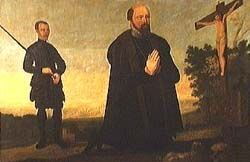
Otte Krumpen

Otte Krumpen (1473–1569) was a Danish bureaucrat, who was Marshal of Denmark from 1554 to 1567, and held seignory over various land holdings throughout his career. He held a ceremonial position in the coronation of Danish kings Christian II and Frederick I. He was the older brother of Danish Catholic bishop Stygge Krumpen. The Krumpen family name died with him.

== Biography ==
Otte Krumpen was born the son of Jørgen Krumpen of Skjøtterup and Anne Styggesdatter Rosenkrantz. He was the brother of later Catholic bishop Stygge Krumpen. Nothing is known of his youth, and it is speculated he served as a soldier in foreign armies. He was first mentioned in 1514, as he presented the crown at the coronation of Christian II of Denmark. In 1517, he was granted seignory of Aalholm near Nysted. In 1520, he led Christian II's army to war against Sweden. He defeated Sten Sture the Younger at the Battle of Bogesund, was injured at the Battle of Uppsala, and was knighted by Christian II following the Swedish surrender in Stockholm.

He was granted seignory over Helsingborg in 1521, and fought off a Lübeck invasion at nearby Råå in 1522 alongside Archbishop of Lund Johan Weze. He was then granted seignory of the profitable Tranekær. During the rebellion against Christian II, Krumpen joined new king Frederick I of Denmark. He carried the ceremonial sword during the coronation, and became a member of the Rigsraadet privy council. He successfully expelled Christian II-loyal Søren Norby from Gotland in 1525, travelled with Prince Christian to Norway in 1529, and secured a treaty with the Netherlands against Lübeck in the fall of 1533.

Alongside his brother Stygge, Otte Krumpen was opposed to the Reformation in Denmark. During the Count's Feud civil war between new Protestant king Christian III and Catholic Christian II's supporter count Christopher of Oldenburg, Krumpen surrendered Tranekær to Christopher without resistance. He was granted seignory of Aalholm in exchange, but was evicted by peasant uprising. He was imprisoned first at Nykøbing castle, before Jürgen Wullenwever brought him as hostage to Mecklenburg. Krumpen returned to Denmark in 1536, but it took him much convincing to earn the forgiveness of Christian III.

He re-entered Rigsraadet in 1542, was made seignory of various lucrative land holdings, and took part in various diplomatic dealings for Christian III. He was named Marshal of Denmark in 1554. He once again carried the ceremonial sword at the coronation of Frederick II of Denmark in 1559, but did not have a good relationship with the new king. During the Northern Seven Years' War from 1563 to 1570, Krumpen was given command of the army by Frederick II in 1564, was relieved of his duty again in 1565, and resigned as marshal in 1567. He died in 1569 as the last of the family Krumpen, and was interred at Mariager Abbey.
