= 1521 in Sweden =

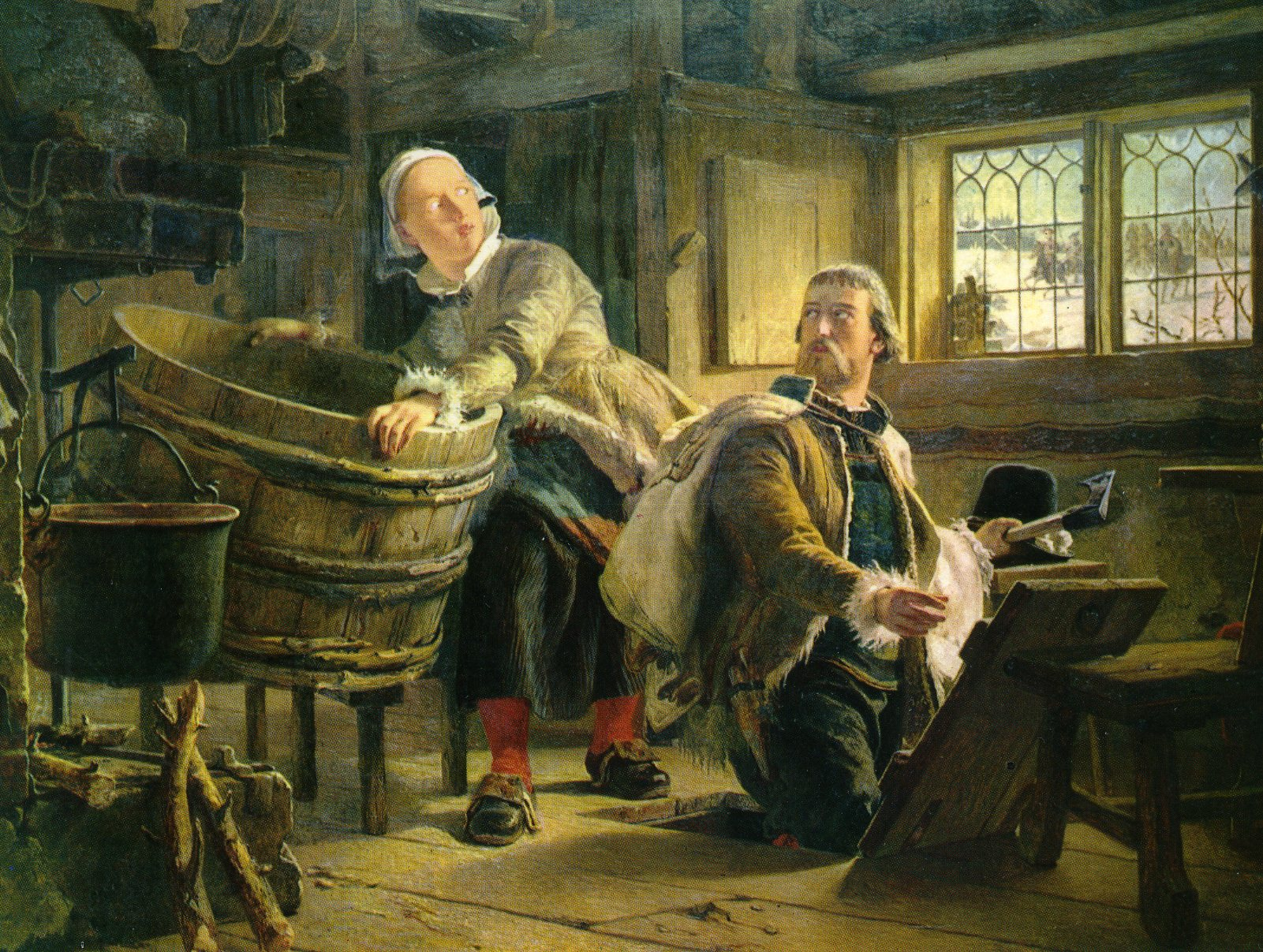

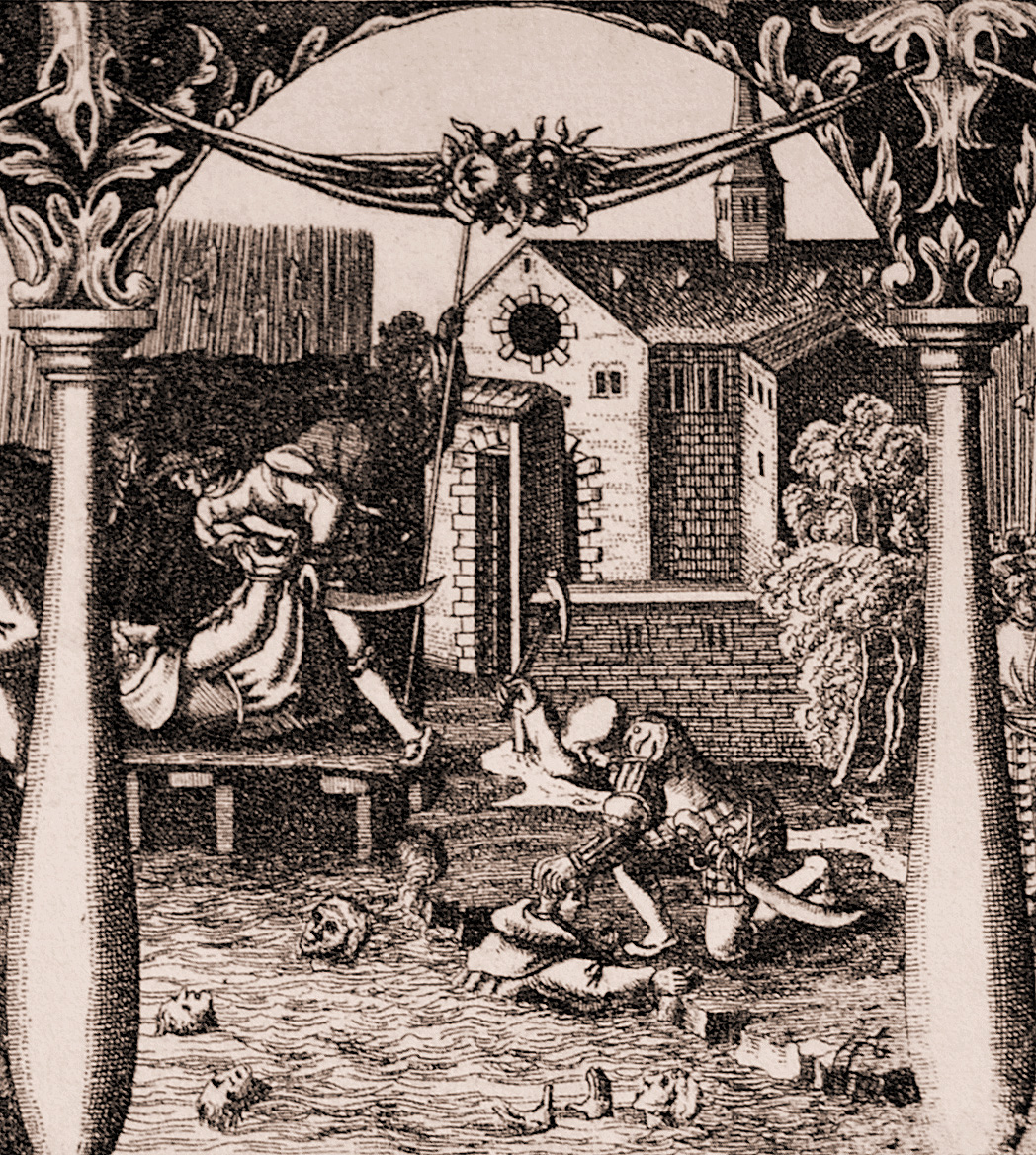

Events from the year 1521 in Sweden

== Incumbents ==
- Monarch – Christian II

== Events ==
- January - The men in Mora, who denied the plea of Gustav Vasa to rebel against the Danes, change their mind and send their best skiers after the fleeing Vasa to tell him this, which inspires the Vasaloppet. The Dalecarlians then elect Vasa as their leader, which is the beginning of the Swedish War of Liberation.
- February 2 – The Nydala Abbey Bloodbath take place in Nydala Abbey.
- March - The rebel army takes control of Falun after the Battle of Falun.
- March - Gustav Trolle is given the task to subdue the rebellion, but fail in Hälsingland and retreat.
- April - Siege of Örebro Castle by the rebels.
- April - Rebel victory at Battle of Brunnbäck Ferry.
- April - Rebel victory at Battle of Västerås, which makes the nobility to choose the side of Vasa against the Danes.
- May - Rebel victory in the Conquest of Uppsala.
- June - Siege of the capital of Stockholm by the rebels.
- August - Gustav Vasa is elected King of Sweden at Vadstena.
- December - Nyköping Castle and Stegeborg Castle fall to the rebels.

== Deaths ==
- - Jakob Ulvsson, archbishop (born 1430s)
