= 1580 in Sweden =

Events from the year 1580 in Sweden

== Incumbents ==
- Monarch – John III

== Events ==
- August - Antonio Possevino inspect the Vadstena Abbey. During his visitation the abbey was reformed according to the latest regulations of the Catholic Church, and Katarina Bengtsdotter Gylta and her prioress swore the Tridentian oath from 1564.
- 4 November - Conquest of Kexholm in Russia

=== Unknown date ===
- Pontus de la Gardie becomes Swedish commander, to combat the Russian war.
- The Dutchman Willem de Wijk is authorized by the crown to command the Swedish mines.
- The so-called Spanish plague reaps victims in Sweden, mainly in Uppland. Uppsala University is temporarily closed.

== Births ==
- Christina Natt och Dag, court official (died 1642)

== Deaths ==
- Unknown date - Valborg Eriksdotter, royal mistress (born 1545)
