= Battle of Bogesund =

Part of Sten Sture's war against Denmark

Coordinates: 57°46′12″N 13°23′43″E

- Part of the Dano-Swedish War (1512–1520)
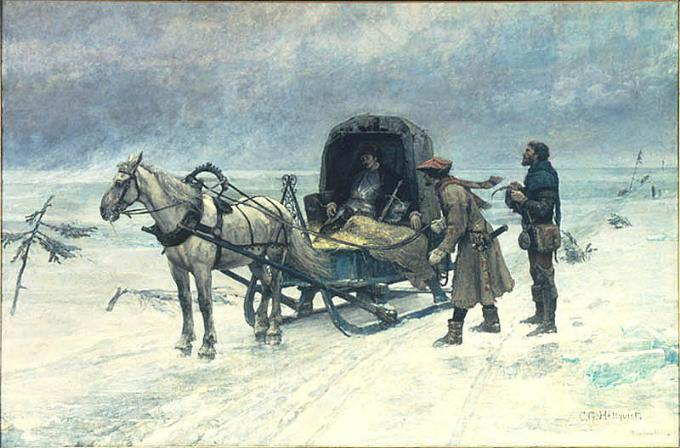
- The Death of Sten Sture the Younger on the ice of lake Mälaren, by Carl Gustaf Hellqvist (1880).
Date	January 19 1520
Location	Lake Åsunden, near Bogesund
Result	Danish victory

Belligerents
Denmark	Sweden

Commanders and leaders
Otte Krumpen	Sten Sture the Younger (DOW)

Strength
10,000	10,000

Casualties and losses
Unknown	Unknown

The Battle of Bogesund was an important conflict in the campaign of Christian II to gain power over Sweden. In 1520, Christian's army of mercenaries had landed in Sweden, seeking to consolidate Christian's powers over Sweden within the Kalmar Union and to unseat the rebellious Swedish riksföreståndare Sten Sture the Younger. On the ice of lake Åsunden near Bogesund, Christian's army led by Otte Krumpen was intercepted by a force led by Sten Sture.

Little is known of the details of the battle. At an early stage, a cannonball ricochetted off the ice, hitting Sten Sture in the leg and killing his horse. Deprived of their leadership, Sture's forces (mostly armed peasants) fell into disarray and fled. Sture himself retreated towards Stockholm, but died of his wounds on the ice of lake Mälaren on February 5.

The anti-union resistance was continued by Sture's widow Christina Gyllenstierna and ultimately Gustav Vasa.

== See also ==
- Stockholm Bloodbath
- Christian II of Denmark
- Gustav I of Sweden
