= Søren Norby =

Danish admiral (1470–1530)

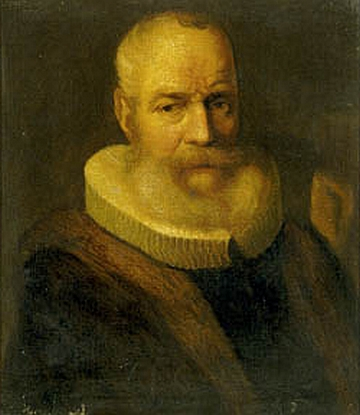
- Portrait, 1525
- Born: c. 1470
- Died: 1530 (aged 59–60)
- Military career
- Allegiance: Kalmar Union; Habsburg Monarchy
- Rank: Admiral
- Conflicts: Dano-Swedish War (1501–1512); Danish attack on Åland (1507); Dano-Swedish War (1512–1520); Siege of Stockholm (1520); Swedish War of Liberation; Finnish campaign (1523); War in Gotland (1524); War of the League of Cognac; Siege of Florence (1529–1530)

Søren Norby, self-styled as Severin Norbi (c. 1470 – 1530), was a Danish leading naval officer in the fleets of Danish kings John and Christian II. He commandeered the greatest ship of the Danish fleet in naval wars against Sweden and Lübeck. Norby governed various land possessions in Scandinavia, ruling Gotland from 1517 to 1525. His rebellion against Frederick I of Denmark in 1525 was defeated, and he fled Denmark, ending his life in the employ of Charles V, Holy Roman Emperor.

Norby had two children with unknown women; a son named Olov and a daughter, of whom little is known.

== Biography ==
Norby was of poor Funen nobility, probably born between the late 1460s and the early 1480s. The first mention of Norby is as a sailor for Swedish regent Svante Nilsson Sture during peace time in 1504. In 1507, he was a captain for Hans I of Denmark and pillaged Åland. Norby commanded the largest ship of Hans' fleet during the war against Sweden and Lübeck from 1507 to 1512, and served alongside Jens Holgersen Ulfstand. In 1510, Norby received a letter of marque from Hans, allowing him to capture enemy vessels as a privateer. For his success in the war, Norby was rewarded with Börringe Priory in Scania and also owned Haraldsborg near Roskilde.

Under new King Christian II of Denmark, Norby was sent as leader of a fleet to aid Charles II of Burgundy against Geldern in 1514. He was granted seignory of Iceland from 1515 to 1517, and in 1517 he was granted Visborg on Gotland, which was made a life-time grant in exchange for Börringe Priory and Haraldsborg in 1518. During Christian II's war to win the throne of Sweden against Lübeck and Sweden from 1517 to 1520, Norby was the leader of the Danish fleet, and attacked both military and merchant vessels from his strategic position at Visborg. Norby was officially allowed to continue with privateering in 1518. He captured, and was subsequently granted, Borgholm on Öland in 1519, and his blockade of Stockholm helped Christian II secure the Swedish throne in 1520. Norby helped make arrests during the Stockholm Bloodbath, but is said to have rescued many Swedes by sailing them out of Stockholm. He was then granted Kalmar Castle. Norby was tasked with finding a sea route to the West Indies via Greenland, but had to abandon his plans due to the rise of Gustav Vasa who was crowned King of Sweden in 1521. In the following years, Norby lost his possession of Öland, but was granted Finland and Norrbotten.

When Christian II abdicated under great pressure in April 1523, Norby was the only seignory who stayed loyal to him. Norby lost Kalmar and Finland that year, and fortified himself at Visborg. He was isolated and began minting his own coins in order to pay his men, bearing the name insignia Severin Norbi. He negotiated with both the new Danish king Frederick I, Sweden, and Lübeck to keep his possession of Visborg. After diplomatic machinations, Norby eventually stayed at Visborg, and he launched a rebellion in Blekinge in April 1525, in the name of Christian II. Frederick I's general Johan Rantzau defeated Norby, and he reached a settlement with Denmark, in which Norby exchanged Visborg for land in Blekinge. During the surrender of Visborg, Norby was double crossed by Frederick I's advisor Otte Krumpen and left for capture by Lübeck. However, he was promptly released as his men rejected leaving Visborg without him, and they then resettled in Blekinge as agreed. While in Blekinge, Norby continued his piracy against Lübeck and Sweden, and carried on supporting Christian II against Frederick I. His three enemies finally united to attack him in August 1526.

Norby escaped to Livonia, and travelled to Vasili III of Russia in Moscow. With the help of King Ferdinand I of Bohemia, Norby travelled to Mechelen where he was reunited with Christian II around November 1528. As Christian II's position was too weak to attempt a reconquest of Denmark, Norby travelled to join Charles II of Burgundy, now known as Charles V, Holy Roman Emperor, in 1529. He wrote to Christian II of his partaking in the Siege of Florence in February 1530, where he died shortly thereafter.
