= Magdalena Stenbock =

Swedish countess and salon holder (1649–1727)

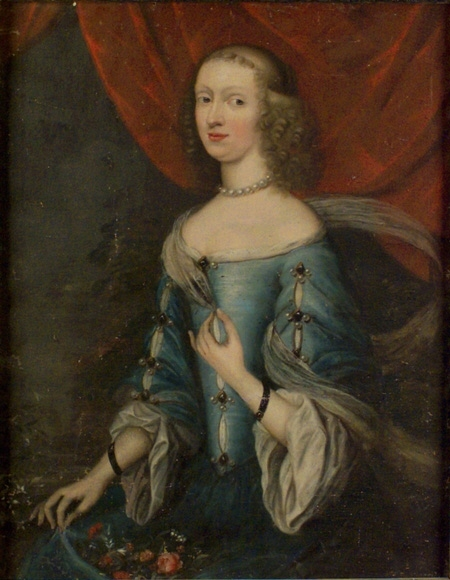
- Born: 14 September 1649
- Died: 24 January 1727 (aged 77)
- Other name: Magdalena Eriksdotter Stenbock
- Spouse(s): Bengt Gabrielsson Oxenstierna (m. 1667–1702; his death)
- Children: 15
- Parent(s): Erik Stenbock; Catharina von Schwerin

Magdalena Eriksdotter Stenbock (14 September 1649 – 24 January 1727) was a politically active Swedish countess and salon holder. She married the Council President and count Bengt Gabrielsson Oxenstierna and was recognized as an important contact by foreign diplomats, promoting an anti-French and pro-Austrian foreign policy through her spouse's office.

== Biography ==
Magdalena Stenbock was the ninth of 14 children born to Count Erik Stenbock (1612-1659), a descendant of Queen Catherine Stenbock, and his first wife Catharina von Schwerin (1619-1655). Magdalena's mother died in childbirth when the girl was just six years old; her father remarried the following year to Occa Johanna von Riperda. Her family was one of the most powerful in Sweden, and she had a strong position at court through her connections: her stepmother served as Mistress of the Robes from 1671–80; her sister, Hedvig Eleonora Stenbock, served as maid of honour to the queen; and her three nieces (among them Beata Sparre, who became influential in her own right) also served as maids of honour.

In 1667, Magdalena Stenbock married riksråd count Bengt Gabrielsson Oxenstierna, who was appointed Council President in 1680. Like her mother, she was constantly pregnant during much of her marriage, giving birth almost once a year. The union produced 15 children in just 20 years, but only seven of them lived to maturity.

Magdalena Stenbock played an influential role in politics during her spouse's tenure in office. During the 1680s and 1690s, Magdalena and Bengt played a similar role as Christina Piper and Carl Piper in the 1700s and Margareta Gyllenstierna and Arvid Horn in the 1720s and 1730s: that of a married couple acting as political colleagues.

Through her marriage, she was seen as a potential channel to her spouse (and through him, the monarch), a role she was very willing to play, and diplomats and supplicants courted her. Foreign diplomats pointed her out as a key figure in Swedish politics because of her influence and saw her as an important person to cultivate. Her salon at the family city residence Hessensteinska palatset was a meeting place for foreign ambassadors in Stockholm, where her gambling table was described as a center of Swedish foreign policy, and it was regarded as a privilege to be invited there and to Rosersberg Palace, the family's country estate. The ambassadors of Austria (Franz Ottokar Starhemberg), the Netherlands (Walraven van Heckeren), Lüneburg (Görtz) and Saxony (Senff von Pilsach) were all frequent guests in her salon.

As a person, Magdalena Stenbock has been described as proud and haughty, a skillful intriguer and "in wisdom above her husband and her gender". In the reports of foreign diplomats, the views of her spouse, which were important due to his office, were often described in connection to that of his spouse: it was seldom mentioned what the count himself thought as a person, but rather what the count and countess thought collectively. She was known to openly state her views: in April 1698, for example, she openly declared that her spouse had found a way to oppose an alliance between Sweden and France and that he was about to write a memorial proving why such an alliance would be a mistake.

During the late 17th century, the alliance policy was an important factor in which she was an active participator. She was anti-French and pro-Habsburg, supporting an alliance between Sweden and Austria against France. She also endorsed a marriage alliance between Sweden and Austria and tried to prevent a marriage alliance between Austria and Poland. According to the Danish ambassador Jens Juel, she and her spouse were both bought by bribes from the Holy Roman Emperor.

Around 1700, Bengt Gabrielsson Oxenstierna lost his leading position in Swedish politics to Carl Piper and Magdalena Stenbock to Christina Piper, which was reportedly taken as an insult by them, as the Pipers were only newly ennobled and considered upstarts. Nevertheless, Magdalena Stenbock acted and courted Christina Piper with gifts to promote the careers of her relatives. After becoming a widow in 1702, it was reportedly thanks to Carl Piper that Magdalena Stenbock could keep her late spouse's pension. During the fire of the royal palace Tre kronor in 1697, the royal family took refuge in her home.

Unfortunately, most of Magdalena's children died prematurely; only three of them were still alive at the time of her death.

== See also ==
- Hedvig Catharina Lillie
