= Anna Catharina von Bärfelt =

Anna Catharina Charlotta Wilhelmina von Bärfelt (1673 – Linköping, 2 April 1738), was a Swedish courtier and an influential royal favourite of Queen Hedwig Eleonora. She was immensely unpopular and rumoured to abuse her influence and position to receive bribes for influencing the queen and stealing from the royal possessions. She was convicted of theft and expelled from court.

== Royal favourite ==
Anna Catharina von Bärfelt was the daughter of Lieutenant Colonel Bernhard Bärfelt. In 1687, she became seamstress and in 1695 the lady's maid of the Queen Dowager Hedwig Eleonora: this was, at that point, a position which could be filled by a member of the lesser nobility.

Von Bärfelt soon became a personal favourite of the queen dowager, which placed her in a position of power at court. She was rumored to accept bribes from supplicants. According to the French envoy, Jacques de Campredon, von Bärfelt had accumulated a fortune amounting to the sum of 100.000 ecus from supplicants to the queen dowager. Among the supplicants were clients from both the nobility and the public, and she was able to secure positions for applicants through her influence.

Reportedly, she had the talent to caricature people, and made enemies by ridiculing them before the queen. Her position as a favorite made her unpopular, and she was exposed to slander. As a person, she was described as a cunning, bold, promiscuous and greedy character, and was accused of stealing from the royal residences and from the household of the queen dowager herself, and of using poison against her enemies. On one occasion, von Bärfelt was attacked and mistreated on the street by unknown men.

== Exile from court ==
In 1709, the queen dowager's alleged lover, Count Carl Gyllenstierna, attempted to convince Hedwig Eleonora to exile von Bärfelt from court. Von Bärfelt retaliated by accusing Gyllenstierna of greed and embezzlement. This caused an open conflict, upon which Gyllenstierna openly gave the queen dowager an ultimatum: "Either miss Bärfelt leave or I will leave". The queen dowager reacted by leaving the room.

Gyllenstierna now united with a party of von Bärfelt's enemies consisting of the queen dowager's confessor Molin, Arvid Horn, Christina Piper, Märta Berendes and Beata Sparre, and united in their request to Hedwig Eleonora that von Bärfelt should be investigated and banished. Hedwig Eleonora eventually relented and agreed to send von Bärfelt away from court. However, she refused any charges put against her and banned any one from searching the luggage of von Bärfelt to investigate of any stolen goods were there.

Gyllenstierna gave the order that the door of Hedwig Eleonora be locked the last night von Bärfelt was in the castle to prevent her from having any chance to gain access to the queen dowager and convince her to let her stay. Von Bärfelt left her position with a full royal pension. During her departure from the capital, she was reportedly followed by a mob of street urchins who sang insulting songs and threw stones after her.

== Trial ==
After her departure, however, it was found that several of the missing goods she was suspected of having stolen, were stored by her friend, the royal court painter Andreas von Behn, and with her alleged lover, the steward of Karlberg Palace.

In 1712, von Bärfelt was arrested and put on trial for theft despite the opposition of Queen Dowager Hedwig Eleonora. Her lover and accomplice committed suicide once he learned of her arrest. Among her possessions, several objects were found traditionally used for the practice of magic: a collection of teeth from pigs and snakes and feet of hares. Evidently, she had manufactured several magic objects and practiced a form of ritual magic to keep the affection of the queen dowager, and control which supplicants the latter should approve or turn down. Because of this, witchcraft was formally added to her charges, though it seems that this charge was not regarded as something of importance, and the trial against her focused on the charge of theft.

Von Bärfelt was found guilty of the theft of a velvet jacket. While in prison awaiting the final verdict, she sent a letter of appeal to the court in which she included a counter accusation against Gyllenstierna on the same charges that she was herself accused of. She was sentenced to death. However, in July 1712, the sentence was soon after commuted to fourteen days on water and bread followed by imprisonment in a work house.

In May 1715, her property was restored and she was by that time evidently released from prison. From 1721, von Bärfelt lived a life of poverty in Linköping.

== See also ==
- Emerentia von Düben
