= Christinehof Castle =

Manor house in Scania, Sweden

- Christinehofs slott
- Kristianstad Municipality
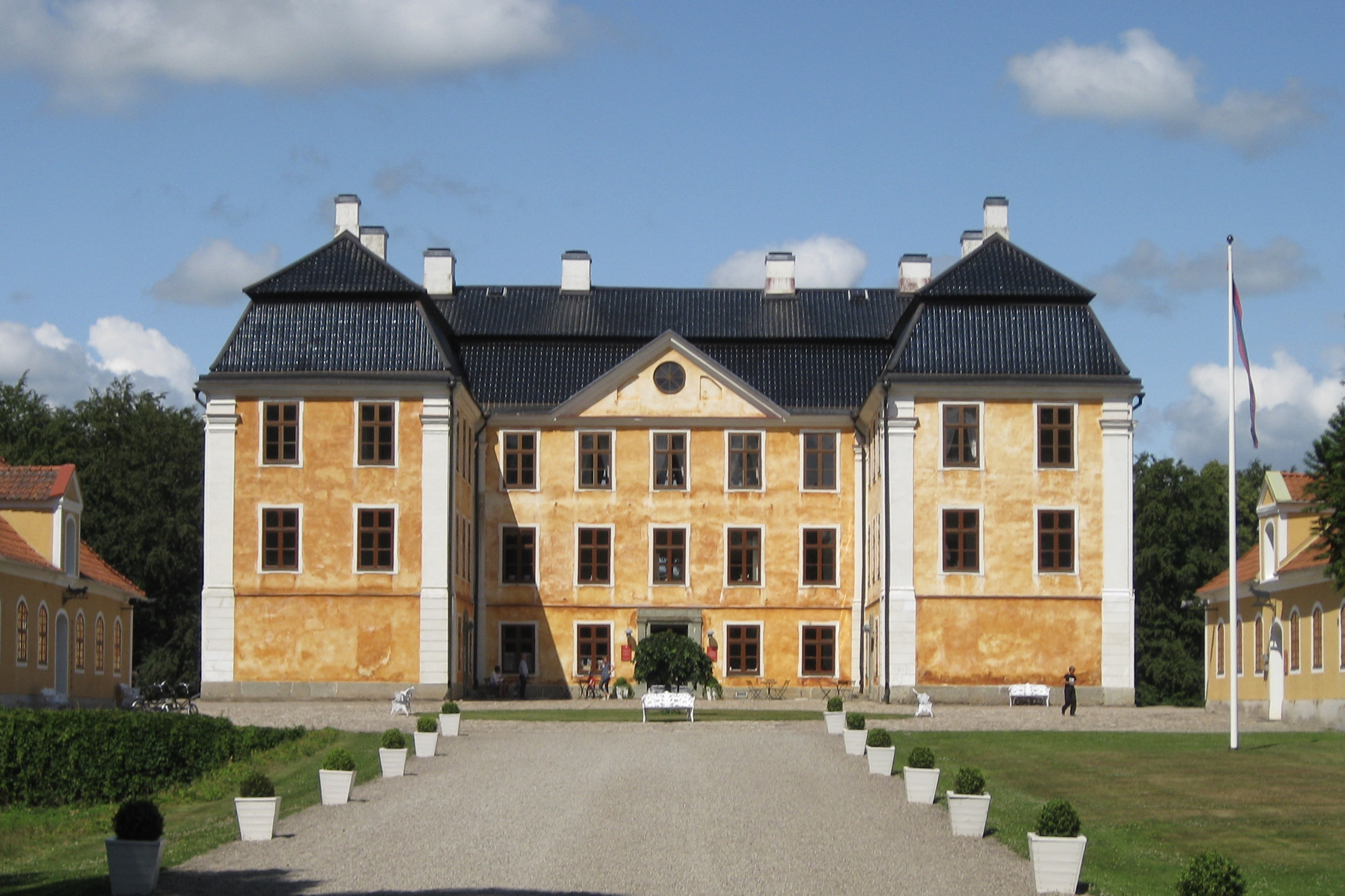
- Christinehof Castle

Site information
- Type: Manor House
- Open to the public: Yes

Location
- Scania, Sweden
- Location within Skåne
- Coordinates: 55.7179°N 13.9607°E

Site history
- Built: 1730s

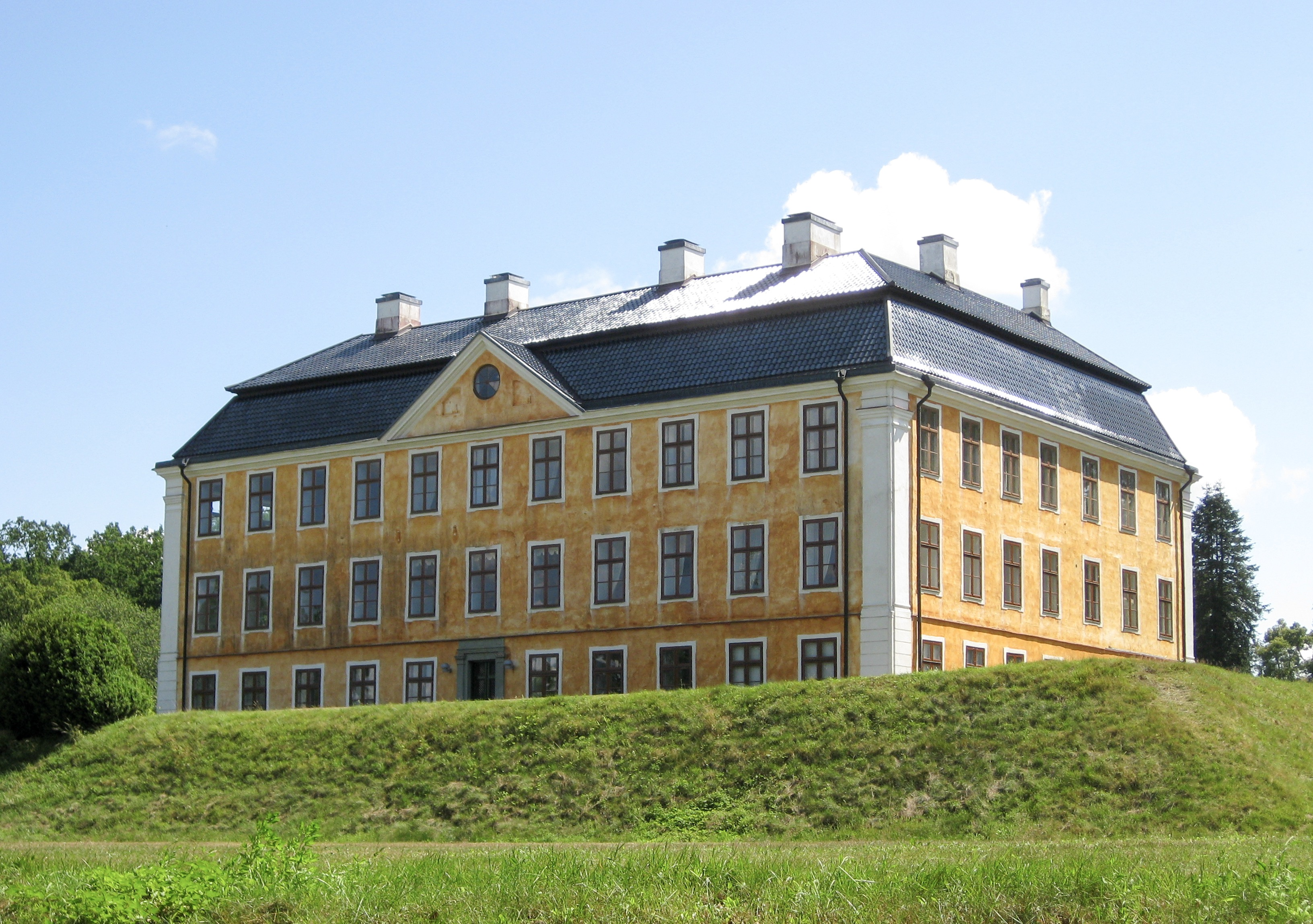
The castle from the north

Christinehof Castle (Swedish: Christinehofs slott) is a manor house in Tomelilla Municipality, Scania, Sweden.

== History ==
The first estate mentioned on the site was situated in the 14th-century, and named Sjöstrup, according to tradition owned by a German noble named Snakenborg. In 1387, the estates Kolstrup and Sjöstrup were united to the estate Andrarum, which was bought in 1725 by Christina Piper (1673–1752), widow of Carl Piper (1647–1716), head of the field chancellery under King Carl XII . The present castle was built in 1737–1740 by Christina Piper and named Christinehof after her. It was built in the German Baroque style.

== See also ==
- List of castles in Sweden
