= Andrarum Church =

- Andrarums kyrka
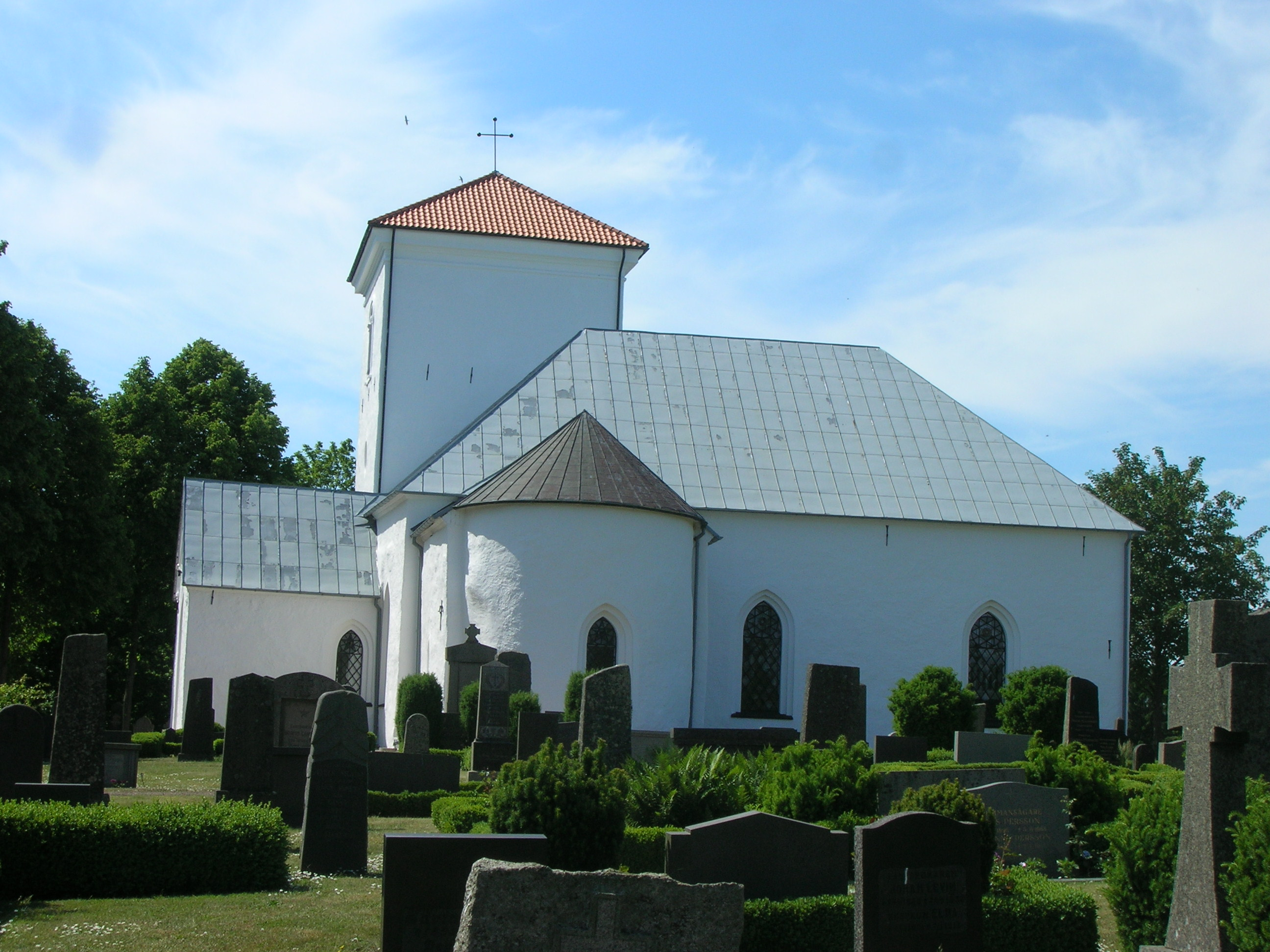
- Andrarum Church

- 55°42′27″N 13°57′48″E
- Country: Sweden
- Denomination: Church of Sweden

Administration
- Diocese: Lund

Andrarum Church (Swedish: Andrarums kyrka) is a church in Andrarum in the Swedish province Skåne. Built in the 12th century, it attained its present look in the 18th century.

== History and architecture ==
The church in Andrarrum was built in the 12th century. Originally it consisted of a nave, chancel and an apse. During the 15th century, the earlier ceiling was replaced with vaults. A small southern transept was built in 1709, and in 1768 a large northern transept was constructed, to house the congregation which had grown because of the foundation of the nearby alum factory, an early example of industrialisation in Sweden. With the new, large transept, the altar was moved to the southern transept, while the earlier nave was more or less destroyed during the rebuilding. The tower was built in 1817, and the sacristy in 1862.

The chancel still contains some late medieval murals from the second half of the 15th century. They depict the Four Evangelists and their symbols. The baptismal font is the oldest item in the church, and was probably installed when the church was originally built in the 12th century. The pulpit and altarpiece are both from 1742, and in Baroque style. They were donated to the church by Christina Piper.
