= Märta Berendes =

Märta Berendes (21 January 1639 – 18 October 1717), was a Swedish Baroness and diary writer. She served as överhovmästarinna (Mistress of the Robes) at the Swedish royal court from 1693 to 1717. She is the author of a diary written between 1676 and 1698, which has been published and has been the object of research.

== Life ==
Märta Berendes was the daughter of the nobleman Johan Berendes (d. 1652) and Ingeborg Kurck (d. 1654). She inherited a fortune after her father's death.

In 1656, she married her uncle's brother-in-law, baron Johan Sparre of Bohnerö and Walstanäs (d. 1659). She describes this marriage as happy, but her spouse was sickly, and left her a widow with two children.

In 1662, she married secondly to riksråd baron Gustaf Posse af Hedensund till Arnäs (1626-1676). She also described this marriage as happy, but her second spouse, like the first, was sickly, and he and four of her children all died of smallpox in 1675-76. After her second widowhood, she attended to the management of her fortune and estates to support her children, until she was given an office at court in 1687.

She had eleven children, but only two survived her. In 1689 she lost her two adult sons, Axel Sparre and Carl Gustaf Posse, who fell in battle in military service on the continent, and in 1698 she lost her daughter Margareta in childbirth.

=== Court career ===
Märta Berendes served as maid of honour to queen Christina of Sweden in 1652-1654, and to the next queen, Hedvig Eleonora of Holstein-Gottorp, in 1654-1656, her aunt Kerstin Kurck having already held that position. In her autobiography, she commented that she did not wish to become a maid of honour as she disliked the life at court and accepted the office only to avoid offending the queen, and that she in fact seldom served, having to take leave to attend her sick mother.

From 1687 until 1715, she served as Mistress of the Robes to the queen dowager Hedvig Eleonora. After the death of the queen, Ulrika Eleonora of Denmark in 1693, the queen dowager was in effect the first lady of the Swedish court, making Berendes in effect first in rank of all female courtiers.

From 1693 until her death, she had was additionally given the office of överhovmästarinna (in this case in effect that of royal governess) at the court of the princesses, Hedvig Sophia of Sweden and Ulrika Eleonora of Sweden.

Berendes was described as a melancholic and passionately religious widow.

She had an important position at court, being treated with familiarity by the royal family: King Charles XII of Sweden referred to her as 'Old Aunt'.

In 1709, she participated in the court camarilla consisting of herself, Arvid Horn, the queen dowager's priest Molin, Beata Sparre and Christina Piper who formed an alliance with Carl Gyllenstierna and successfully evicted Anna Catharina von Bärfelt from court.

== Author ==
Märta Berendes wrote her autobiography or diary in the back pages of her prayer book, which recounts her life from the death of her first spouse in 1659 until the death of her daughter in 1698, when the pages of her prayer book ended.

It is written in the form of a litany of sorrows, depicting her misfortune caused by the death of her husbands and children, describing life as a martyrdom possible to endure only by the help of religion. Her description of her life centers on the sorrow she felt for the illness of her mother, the illnesses and deaths of her first and second husband, and the deaths of all but two of her eleven children.

It has been published and subject to research.

Court offices
Preceded by Occa Maria Johanna von Riperda	Chief Court Mistress of Hedwig Eleonora; 1687–1715	Succeeded by None
Preceded by ?	Royal Governess (Sweden); 1693–1717	Succeeded by Hedvig Elisabet Strömfelt
