= Hedwig Eleonora of Holstein-Gottorp =

Queen of Sweden from 1654 to 1660

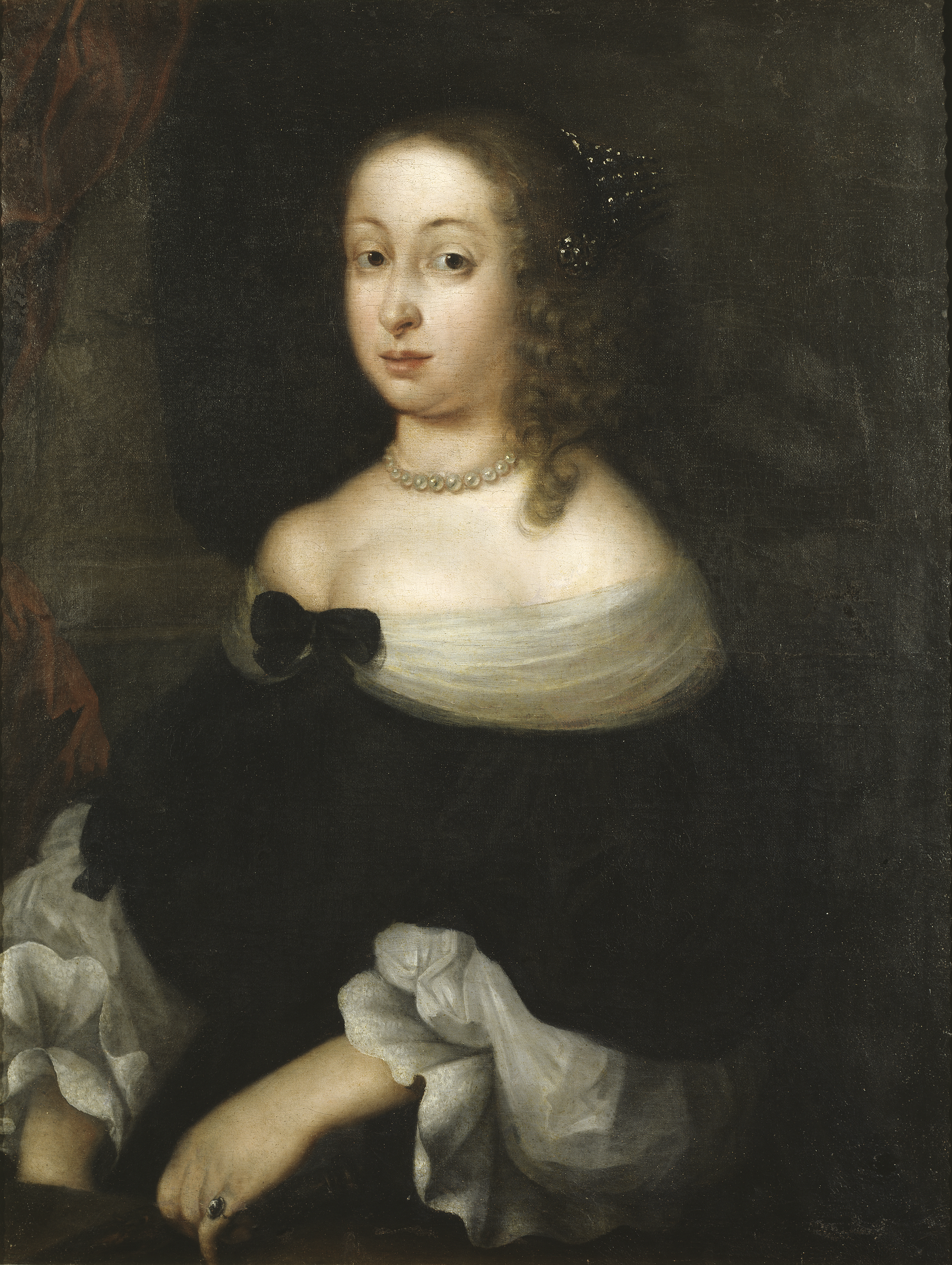
- Portrait by Nicolas Vallari

Queen consort of Sweden
- Tenure: 24 October 1654 – 13 February 1660
- Coronation: 27 October 1654

Queen regent of Sweden
- Tenure: 13 February 1660 – 18 December 1672
- Monarch: Charles XI
- Tenure: 5 April 1697 – 15 December 1697
- Monarch: Charles XII
- Born: 23 October 1636; Palace of Gottorp, Schleswig
- Died: 24 November 1715 (aged 79); Sweden
- Spouse: Charles X Gustav of Sweden (m. 1654; died 1660)
- Issue: Charles XI of Sweden
- House: Holstein-Gottorp
- Father: Frederick III, Duke of Holstein-Gottorp
- Mother: Duchess Marie Elisabeth of Saxony

Hedwig Eleonora of Holstein-Gottorp (Swedish: Hedvig Eleonora; 23 October 1636 – 24 November 1715) was Queen of Sweden from 1654 until 1660 as the wife of King Charles X Gustav. She served as regent during the minority of her son, King Charles XI, from 1660 until 1672, and during the minority of her grandson, King Charles XII, in 1697. She also represented Charles XII during his absence in the Great Northern War from 1700 until the regency of her granddaughter Ulrika Eleonora in 1713. Hedwig Eleonora was described as a dominant personality, and was regarded as the de facto first lady of the royal court for 61 years, from 1654 until her death.

== Biography ==
=== Early life ===
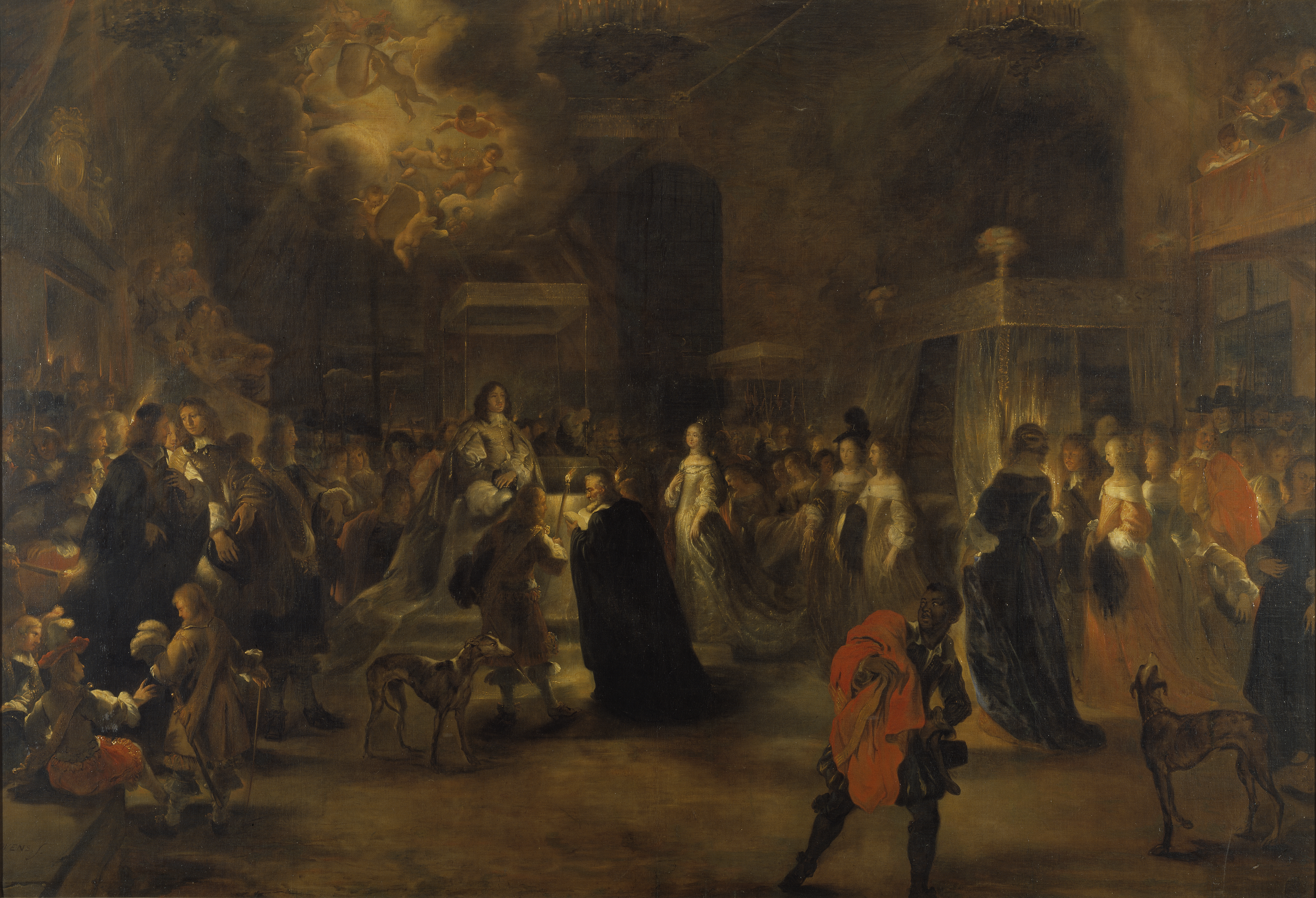
Consummation ceremony after the wedding of King Carl Gustav and Queen Hedwig Eleanor in 1654.

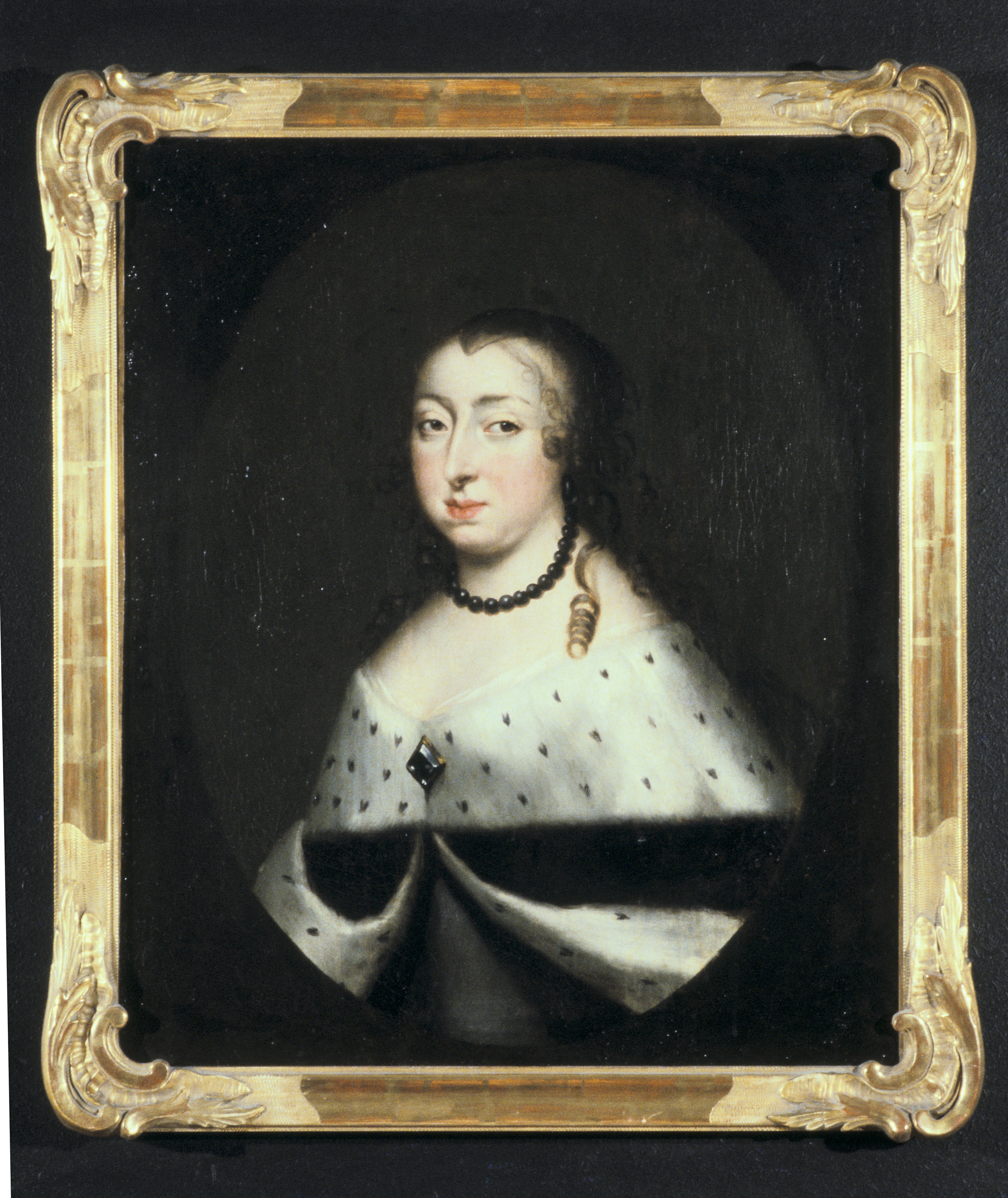
Hedwig Eleanor

Hedwig Eleonora was born on 23 October 1636 in the Palace of Gottorp in Schleswig, to Duke Frederick III of Holstein-Gottorp and Marie Elisabeth of Saxony. She was the sixth of the couple's sixteen children. One day after her eighteenth birthday, she was married to King Charles X Gustav of Sweden on 24 October 1654. Charles Gustav was the second cousin of Hedwig Eleonora's mother. He and Hedwig Eleonora were also third cousins twice. The marriage was arranged as an alliance between Sweden and Holstein-Gottorp against their mutual enemy Denmark. Queen Christina of Sweden met Hedwig Eleonora in Holstein-Gottorp on her way to Rome after her abdication. Christina was concerned that Charles Gustav was unmarried, and so she suggested the match. The suggestion was immediately accepted by Holstein-Gottorp, who agreed to all demands from Sweden, which made the negotiations quick. Hedwig Eleonora was at the time engaged to Gustav Adolph, Duke of Mecklenburg-Güstrow, and Queen Christina recommended Hedwig Eleonora's elder sister, Magdalene Sibylle of Holstein-Gottorp. After having seen portraits of both sisters, however, Charles Gustav chose Hedwig Eleonora because of her beauty, and her current fiancé was instead married to Magdalena Sibylle. In the marriage contract, Hedwig Eleonora was granted a dowry of 20.000 riksdaler, 32.000 riksdaler as a dower, and the incomes of the fiefs of Gripsholm, Eskilstuna and Strömsholm.

=== Queen of Sweden ===
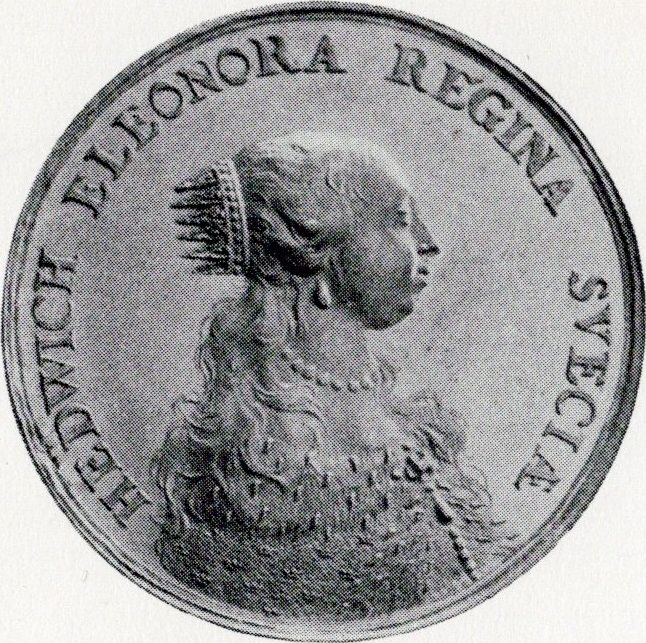
The new queen in 1654

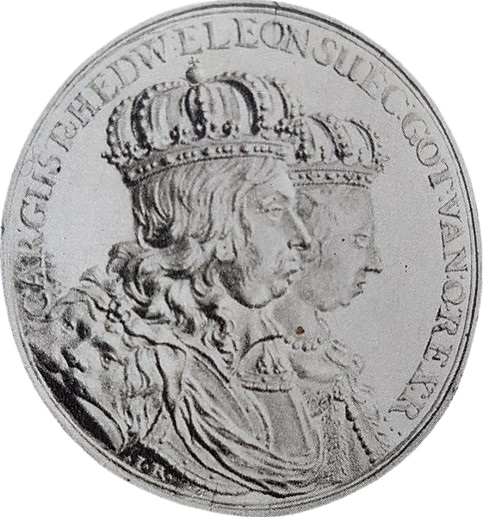
Medal for the royal couple

Hedwig Eleonora was welcomed by King Charles X Gustav at Dalarö in Sweden 5 October 1654, and stayed at Karlberg Palace before her official arrival at Stockholm for the wedding 24 October. She was greeted, dressed in silver brocade, by queen dowager Maria Eleonora of Brandenburg at the Stockholm Royal Palace, where the wedding was celebrated the same day. She was crowned queen at Storkyrkan 27 October. Shortly after, her husband left for Poland to participate in the Deluge. Hedwig Eleonora remained in Sweden for the birth of the future Charles XI the 24 November 1655 and the following Christmas. The spring of 1656, she left Sweden and followed Charles Gustav during his campaign, during which she displayed both physical and mental strength. She was present during the Battle of Warsaw (1656), during which she received the official praise from the Swedish army alongside her spouse. She returned to Sweden in the autumn of 1656. In Sweden, she took control over her dower lands, which she strictly controlled during her life. After the Dano-Swedish War (1657–1658)), she was called to join her husband at Gothenburg, then she followed him to Gottorp and Wismar. During the Dano-Swedish War (1658-1660), she and her sister-in-law Maria Eufrosyne of Pfalz lived at Kronborg in Denmark after it had been taken by the Swedish general Carl Gustaf Wrangel. At Kronborg, Hedwig Eleonora was visited by her husband and entertained the foreign ambassadors. She visited Frederiksborgs Palace and hunted in the woods with the English ambassador. During the Falster campaign, she entertained the ambassadors at Nyköbing Falster. Hedwig Eleonora left for Gothenburg in December 1659, where the Swedish parliament was to assemble in January 1660.

=== Regency ===
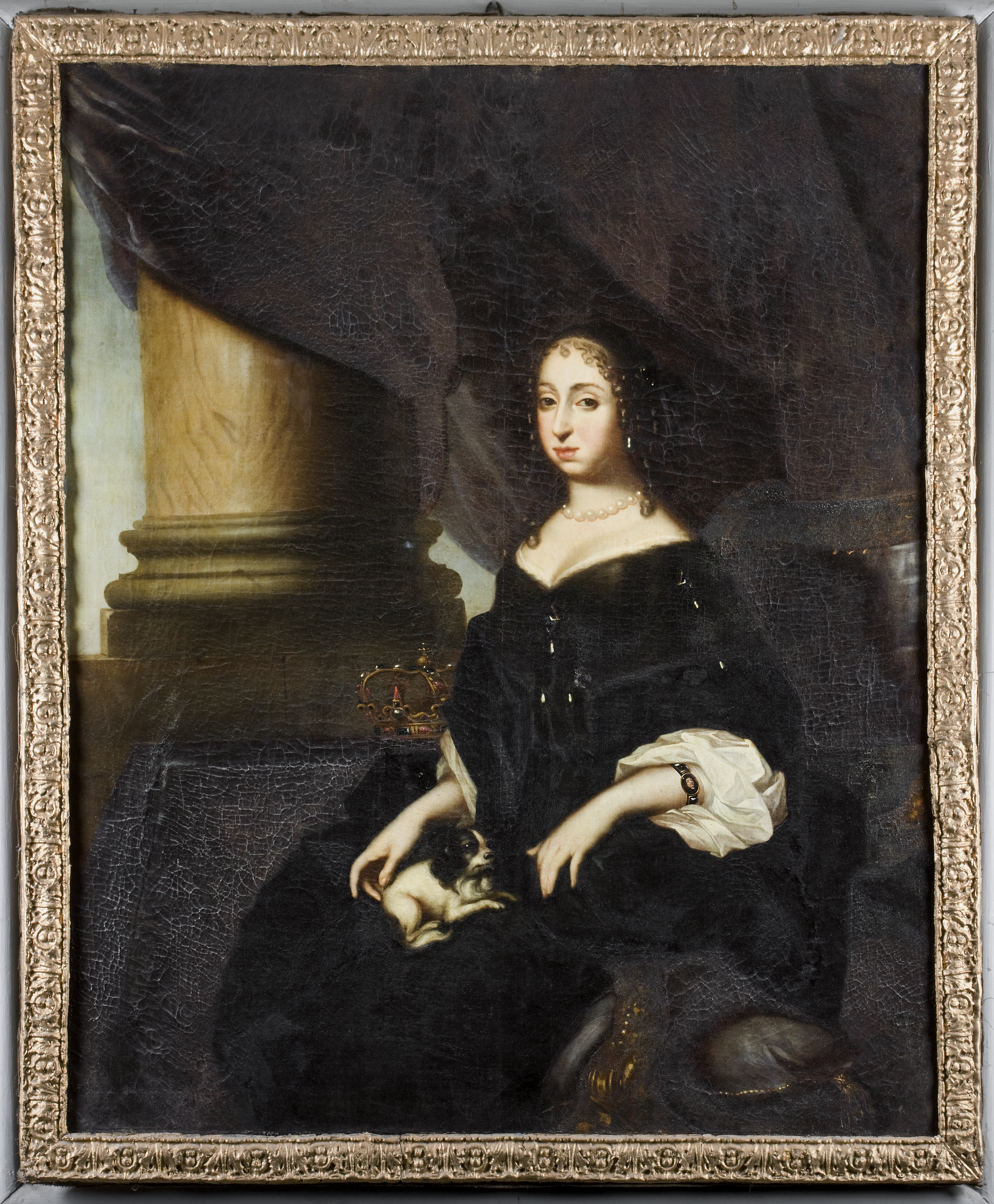
Hedwig Eleonora of Holstein-Gottorp, from 1661–1675.

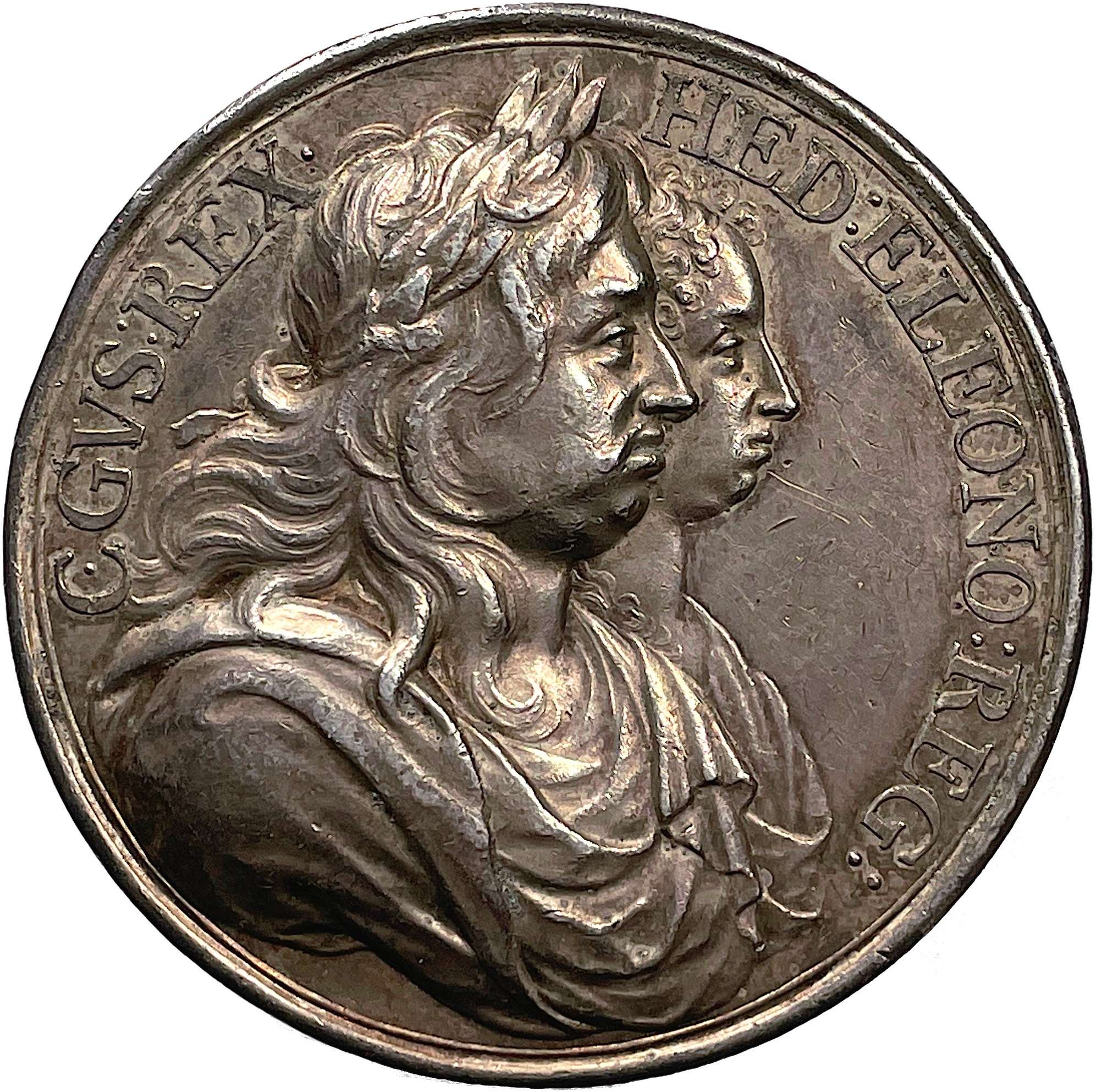
Queen Hedwig shown on a 1680 medal in memory of her late husband

After the death of her husband on 13 February 1660, Hedwig Eleonora became regent of Sweden and chair of the Regency Council of her son Charles XI during his minority. According to the will and testament of Charles Gustav, Hedwig Eleonora was to be the chair and regent with two votes and a final say over the rest of the council: the power over the government was shared with five high officials, including Per Brahe, but her vote was to be the preferred one. The will was immediately contested by the council, especially because her former brother-in-law Adolph John I, Count Palatine of Kleeburg, had been given power over the army. The day after the death of her husband, Hedwig Eleonora sent a message to the council that she knew that they contested the will, and she demanded that it should be respected. The council answered that the will must first be discussed with the parliament. At the following council in Stockholm 13 May, the council tried to keep her from attending. They questioned whether it would be good for her health or suitable for a widow to attend council, and that if not, it would be hard to keep sending a messenger to her quarters. Her reply that the council would be allowed to meet without her and only inform her when they considered it necessary was met with satisfaction from the council. Hedwig Eleonora's ostensible indifference to politics came as a great relief to the lords of the guardian government.

Despite her initial message, Hedwig Eleonora was in fact present at all council meetings except when she was away to administrate her dower lands. She used her position as regent foremost to protect her son's interests and rights toward the council, and thereby saw it as her duty to be informed and present in the decisions, although she did not take part in them. Adolph John of Kleeburg had lost command of the army and his status as a prince of Sweden, and her only support in the council came from Magnus Gabriel De la Gardie. Aware of the fact that she did not have enough support in the council to manage her own policy, she did not wish to risk being maneuvered from her position by challenging the council. She concurred with the anti-Danish and pro-French foreign policy during the regency years. She did, however, dislike war and gave her support to the peace party in the council: she gave her support to the Peace of Oliva, unsuccessfully opposed the war against Bremen, but successfully prevented a suggested war toward Russia, which is described as the only time when she forced her will upon the council.

Hedwig Eleonora herself described how she disliked politics and diplomacy, and she did not participate much in politics during her regency. Her minor part in politics during her time as regent resulted in the fact that her son exempted her when he later accused the guardian government for power abuse during their regency. During her son's first appearances in Parliament, he talked only to the members of the government through her; he would whisper the questions he had to the Parliament to her, and she would ask them loud and clear.

After the death of her son on 5 April 1697, Hedwig Eleonora again became the regent of Sweden, as the chair of the Regency Council during the minority of her grandson Charles XII. This time, her regency only lasted until the declaration of her grandson's majority in December the same year. During her second regency, she supported the marriage alliance between Sweden and Holstein-Gottorp through the wedding of her granddaughter Hedvig Sophia of Sweden to the Duke of Holstein-Gottorp. She opposed the early declaration of majority of Charles XII, but was forced to concede. She also unsuccessfully protested against the fact that her grandson was not asked to make any oath at his coronation.

During her regency, she kept thorough records of her contracts and accounts. She spent significant sums to restore the grandeur of the court, since Queen Christina had taken many of the treasures on her abdication. She was able to cover these costs from the significant income from her personal lands. She oversaw the construction of multiple manors and palaces, including Drottningholm Palace.

=== Queen dowager ===
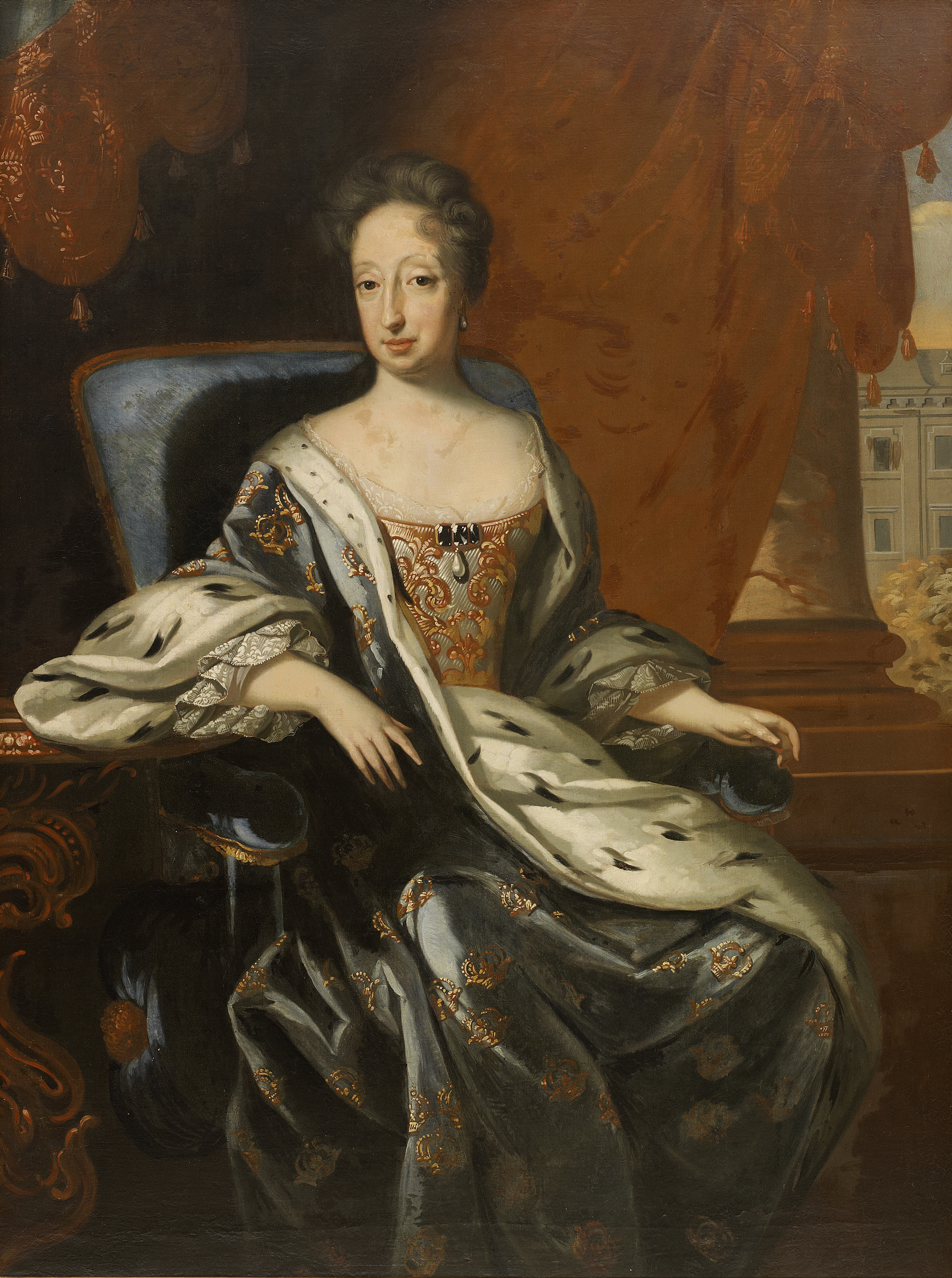
Hedwig Eleonora of Holstein-Gottorp by David von Krafft

Hedwig Eleonora enjoyed great respect as queen dowager. She focused more on the administration of her dower lands and the upbringing of her son rather than to politics. In her upbringing of her son Charles XI, she focused on religion and moral and physical training and athletics rather than on academic studies, and she has been criticized for having spoiled him by not having forced him to attend to his studies. Although she herself was interested in culture and the sciences, she put no demands on him and allowed him to skip his studies: as he had a frail health during childhood, she found it more important for him to strengthen his body, and to discipline his moral by studies of religion.

In 1661, Hedwig Eleonora was considered a possible wife for King Charles II of England. Nothing came of it, however, as she refused the proposal: the official ground for her refusal was that she claimed that she wished to remain faithful to her dead husband.

In 1667, the young nobleman Count Carl Gyllenstierna (1649–1723), was made chamberlain to Hedwig Eleonora. He became her favourite, served as her courier during the Scanian War, was promoted General-Governor of her dower lands in 1679 and was given the title of count in 1687. Carl Gyllenstierna was the favourite of Hedwig Eleonora and has been pointed out as her lover, and although this is not confirmed, his swift career at court was attributed to his good looks. There is a legend that the residence of Gyllenstierna, Steninge Palace, was built with a secret passage from his bedroom to the bedroom in the so-called Queen's Wing, which was used by Hedwig Eleonora during her frequents visits. During her later years, Hedwig Eleonora was criticized for her favourite, Anna Catharina von Bärfelt, whose influence led to an open conflict with Gyllenstierna. Bärfelt was known for taking bribes from supplicants to the queen dowager and rumoured to steal from her. Gyllenstierna made an ultimatum and asked Hedwig Eleonora to choose between him and Bärfelt, which eventually led to Bärfelt being banished from court after Gyllenstierna had formed an alliance with Christina Piper, Beata Sparre, the mistress of the robes Märta Berendes, Arvid Horn and the court chaplain Molin. The night before her departure, Gyllenstierna had to door to Hedwig Eleonora's bedroom locked to prevent Bärfelt from contacting the queen dowager.

Hedwig Eleonora corresponded with her German relatives and often entertained them as guests: she raised her niece Magdalena Sibylla of Hesse-Darmstadt as her foster child, as well as her late husband's niece, Juliana of Hesse-Eschwege. The latter was long unofficially understood to be the future queen by marriage to Charles XI when he became an adult, but the plan was abandoned when Juliana gave birth to a child outside of marriage (1672). Hedwig Eleonora had Juliana sent to the country side, but when she had a second child, she was forcibly married to the father and expelled.

Hedwig Eleonora had a very close relationship with her son, Charles XI, who “kept himself to her completely and unreservedly”. She accompanied him during his trips around the country, and during the Scanian war, she often stayed in Vadstena, where he visited her from the war front, to be closer to him. Even after her son's marriage to Ulrike Eleonora of Denmark, she essentially kept her position as the first lady of the court. Charles XI referred to his mother as “The Queen” or “Her Majesty the Queen My Dear Lady Mother” and to Ulrike Eleonora simply as "My Wife". Foreign ambassadors, mindful of this, always paid their respects to Hedwig Eleonora first, and then to Ulrike Eleonora. The hostility between Holstein-Gottorp and Denmark also made the relationship between Hedwig Eleonora and her Danish daughter-in-law tense. Charles XI regularly discussed the affairs of state with his mother, and while it does not appear that she purposely influenced him, he respected her opinions and usually followed them.

Charles XI is believed to have been affected by his mother when he judged the Catechism of the Bishops Terseri, Spegel and Emporagi as heresy: it is known that Hedwig Eleonora especially disliked the catechism of Bishop Emporagi, because it defined women as property. Also Charles XI decisions in the area of rank and art is believed to be influenced by her.

Her grandson Charles XII had great respect for her. There is a well-known episode from the so-called Gottorp Fury, when Charles XII spent his time drinking and partying with his brother-in-law and her nephew Frederick IV, Duke of Holstein-Gottorp. On one occasion, Charles XII in a state of drunkenness encountered his grandmother, upon which she gave him a long look and then turned her back to him. He reacted by emptying his cup and saying: “My Gracious Lady Grandmother is pleased to forgive me. From hereafter I will never more drink wine”, a promise he kept. During the Great Northern War, she represented her absent grandson and received the foreign ambassadors in his place. According to their reports, she treated them with silence or could laugh at them.

Hedwig Eleonora was closest to her elder granddaughter, Hedwig Sophia, and after the death of Hedwig Sophia, she supported Hedwig Sophia's son, Charles Frederick, Duke of Holstein-Gottorp, as heir to the throne after Charles XII before her younger granddaughter, Ulrika Eleonora.

The supporters of Charles Frederick also wished to have Hedwig Eleonora appointed regent during the minority of Charles Frederick, should he succeed. In 1713, however, she was forced to persuade Ulrika Eleonora to accept the position of regent during the absence of Charles XII. She supported the marriage of Ulrika Eleonora to Frederick of Hesse with the thought that Ulrika Eleonora would then move to Hesse, which would make it easier for Charles Frederick to succeed to the Swedish throne.

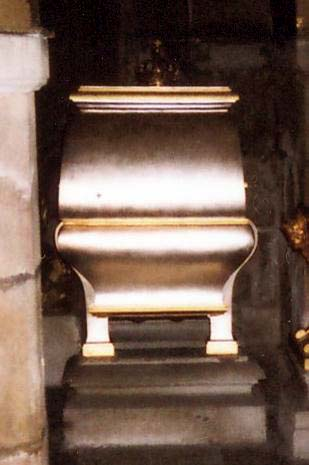
Hedwig Eleanor's coffin at Riddarholm Church

Hedwig Eleonora has been described as firm and dominant; she was popular at court for her humour and because of her fondness of parties, and was regarded as strict but fair by her employees. Among Hedwig Eleonora's interests were architecture and painting, as well as playing cards; her appetite for gambling was great, and she is reported to have continued playing well into the night. When her mourning period officially ended in 1663, the court was overwhelmed with parties hosted by the queen dowager. As part of the festivities, she opened the theatres Bollhuset and Lejonkulan. She also acquired the first spa in Sweden, Medevi (1688). She sponsored artists, such as Nicodemus Tessin the Younger and David Klöcker Ehrenstrahl.

Hedwig Eleonora of Holstein-Gottorp House of Holstein-Gottorp Born: 23 October 1636 Died: 24 November 1715
Royal titles
| Vacant Title last held by Maria Eleonora of Brandenburg | Queen consort of Sweden; 1654–1660 | Vacant Title next held by Ulrike Eleonora of Denmark |
