= Sturefors Castle =

Swedish castle

Coordinates: 58.325°N 15.776°E

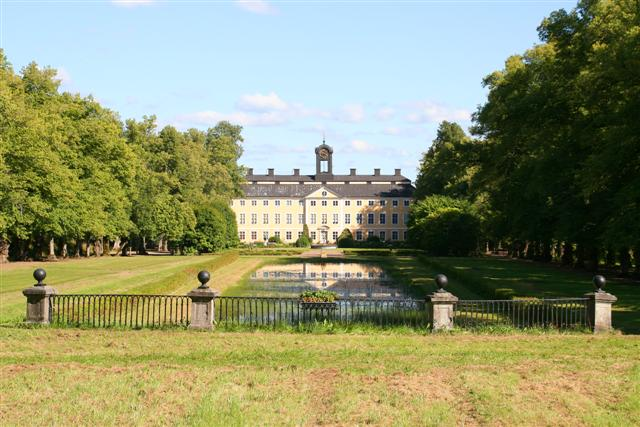
Sturefors Castle

Sturefors Castle is situated outside Linköping, by lake Ärlången, the province of Östergötland, Sweden. It is owned by Count Bielke and is not open to the public.

The first castle was constructed by riksråd nobleman Ture Bielke (1548–1600) in the 16th century. Only the north wing remains of this building. The present castle was constructed in 1704 by Carl Piper as a dower for his spouse Christina Piper. It was designed by Nicodemus Tessin the Younger. After the death of Christina Piper in 1752, it was inherited by her grandson Nils Adam Bielke, and has since then belonged to the Bielke family.
