= Beata Sparre =

Swedish courtier (1662–1724)

Beata Sparre (1662–1724) was a Swedish courtier. She used the net of contacts her office gave her to benefit the interests of both her family, herself personally as well as individual supplicants and foreign powers in exchange for money. She is known for her successful use of her service as lady-in-waiting for lucrative purposes, and considered a notable example of a female courtier who used her office and the net of contact it gave her as a way of creating influence and personal wealth.

== Biography ==
Beata Sparre was the daughter of Baron Axel Carlsson Sparre and Beata Stenbock. She served as a lady-in-waiting to Queen Hedvig Eleonora in 1680–1715 and to Princess Ulrika Eleonora of Sweden in 1715–1720.

She used her position as a courtier by creating a net of influential contacts, which she could use to accept and put forward requests from supplicants in exchange for money. This was a common way for a female courtier to earn money, but like her contemporary Anna Maria Clodt, Sparre was very successful in her line of business. Already during the 1680s, she had created a power base through which she could exact favors from the monarch. The French embassy pointed her out as one of the power holders in the Swedish court necessary to cultivate. She is known to have received gifts from France and may have acted as a French agent, which would make her a spy: it was noted that during the fire of the royal palace in 1697, she saved a portrait of Louis XIV of France which she had been given as a personal gift from France. Her petitions to Charles XII of Sweden went through the channel of the royal princesses and were normally successful. In 1709, she was a part of the group consisting of herself, Arvid Horn, the queen dowager's priest Molin, Christina Piper, and Märta Berendes who evicted Anna Catharina von Bärfelt from court by forming an alliance with Carl Gyllenstierna.

In 1703, she had Princess Ulrika Eleonora acquire a mansion for her by Charles XII. When she finally lost favor at court, she retired to this manor.
