= Christina Piper =

Swedish countess (1673–1752)

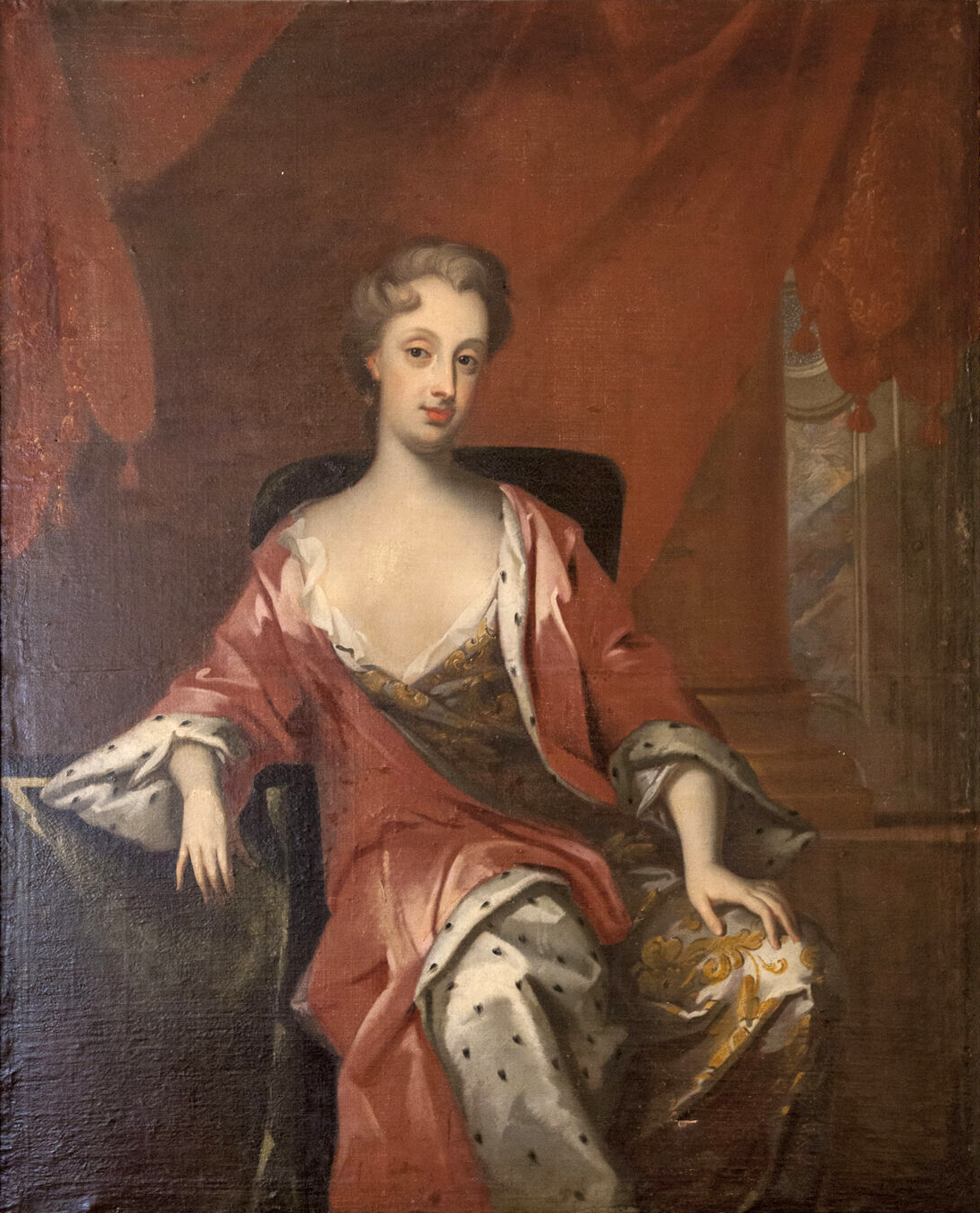
- Christina Piper by David Klöcker Ehrenstrahl, 1698
- Born: Christina Törne; 1 January 1673; Stockholm, Sweden
- Died: 25 March 1752 (aged 79); Krageholm Castle, Sweden
- Spouse(s): Carl Piper (m. 1690–1716; his death)
- Children: 9
- Parent(s): Olof Hansson Törne; Margareta Andersen

Christina Piper (née Törne; 1 January 1673 – 25 March 1752) was a Swedish countess, landowner and entrepreneur who was married to the statesman and military count Carl Piper. During the tenure of her spouse in office, she played a considerable political role. Christina Piper became known in history as a landowner and builder. She is known as one of the most successful female entrepreneurs in contemporary Scandinavia and as one of the greatest builders in the history of Scania.

== Biography ==
Christina Piper was born to the very wealthy merchant and city official Olof Hansson Törne and Margareta Andersen. Her father was ennobled with the name Törnflycht in 1698, but as Christina had married eight years before this, she never bore that name herself. On 13 February 1690, she married the royal official Carl Piper, who was 26 years her senior and the stepbrother of her father. The marriage was arranged for economic reasons: her husband was in need of funds, and as a relative with a good career (he had been ennobled during his career in royal service) he was seen as a good asset to keep in the family.

From 1691 to 1695, Christina Piper gave birth to five daughters, but only one of them survived past early childhood. She went on to have another three daughters and a son, all of whom survived into adulthood.

=== Political activity ===
In 1697, her spouse was appointed statsråd and the following year baron and count, and it became clear he had replaced Bengt Gabrielsson Oxenstierna as the perhaps most favored of the advisers of the monarch, a position he kept until 1709. As was normal for the wife of a politician at the time, this gave Christina Piper an influential role, as she was seen as a potential channel to her spouse, and she began to host a receptions and participate in court life, where she was besieged by diplomats and supplicants attempting to reach her spouse (and by him the King) through her. During the 1700s, Christina Piper and Carl Piper played a similar role as Magdalena Stenbock and Bengt Gabrielsson Oxenstierna in the 1680s and 1690s, and as Margareta Gyllenstierna and Arvid Horn in the 1720s and 1730s: that of a married couple acting as political colleagues. Carl and Christina Piper gained a notorious reputation by their contemporaries for being corrupted by bribes. It is noted that Carl Piper were often offered gifts in exchange for making recommendations for posts to the monarch on behalf of diplomats and supplicants, which was not unusual in that period, but that he normally refused to accept gifts. However, he did accept and even encouraged petitioners to give gifts to his wife: she would then make the recommendations on behalf of the petitioners to him, often successfully. This was, not an unusual method for contemporary officials – their predecessors as a political power couple, Bengt Oxenstierna and Magdalena Stenbock, had in fact done the same – and one reason to why they were given such a notorious reputation because of it may have been the fact that they, being members of a very recently ennobled noble family, were resented by the older nobility as upstarts.

In 1700, Carl Piper left Sweden in the entourage of Charles XII to participate in the Great Northern War, leaving Christina in charge of the family affairs. She visited him in the Swedish military headquarters on two occasions: the first one in Rawicz in 1705, and the second time in Altranstädt in 1707. On her first visit, she was received by the Polish queen Catherine Opalińska and introduced at the Polish court at Rydzyna Castle. Carl Piper was contemplating to visit Sweden for his health, as he was ill at the time, but she persuaded him to stay. During her second visit, in 1707, Carl Piper was approached by John Churchill, 1st Duke of Marlborough, who allegedly offered him a pension in exchange for advising Charles XII to attack Russia. After the Battle of Poltava, which became disastrous for Sweden, Carl Piper was blamed for having ultimately caused the defeat by persuading Charles XII to the Swedish invasion of Russia having been bribed by Marlborough. Carl Piper denied having accepted the bribe, but he did admit that he had accepted a gift of two valuable earrings from the Duke to his wife Christina Piper, who also admitted having accepted them, but denied having done so as a bribe. One her way home, she was escorted by the Prince of Württemberg and a large entourage, and visited Berlin, where she was given a grand welcome by the King of Prussia and the royal Prussian court. During her visit, a statue celebrating the Prussian victory over the Swedes at the Battle of Fehrbellin was removed after she had expressed a dislike for it, and she was given a brilliant bracelet as a gift by the King.

Back in Sweden, she participated in court life, where she was a member of the group consisting of herself, Arvid Horn, the queen dowager's priest Molin, Beata Sparre, and Märta Berendes who evicted the favorite Anna Catharina von Bärfelt from court by forming an alliance with Carl Gyllenstierna.

At the Battle of Poltava 1709, Carl Piper were taken as a prisoner to Russia, where he remained until his death seven years later. When the disastrous news of the Swedish defeat reached the capital of Stockholm, panic erupted and the bank was emptied: Carl Piper was blamed for having persuaded the King to attack Russia, and according to the reports of the Danish and French envoys, Christina Piper was attacked by a mob and forced to flee the capital. She managed negotiations with the government to trade her spouse for Russians prisoners in Sweden, which however did not succeed. According to contemporary unconfirmed rumors, she did in fact not wish for him to return, as she liked the independence she had in his absence. Carl Piper died in his captivity in Russia in 1716; he was brought home in 1718 and finally buried in 1719.

=== Later life ===
After the capture of her spouse, Christina Piper lost all influence over state affairs: she was not popular in the capital, and her connections were of no use after the fall of Carl Piper. For the rest of her life, she devoted herself to her position as a respected matriarch of her family, and her affairs as a major landowner, and traveled between her estates, having her base at Krageholm Castle in Scania. She used her position as a landowner to affect the local policies, and became an important figure in national economy: she was one of the greatest financiers of the Great Northern war. After the death of her daughter Charlotta in 1727, she became the foster mother of her grandchildren Eva Charlotta, Nils Adam and Christina Sofia (the youngest of whom became the mother of Magdalena Rudenschöld).

In 1712, she moved from the capital to her estates in Scania because of the costs. She acquired a great deal of additional estates to the ones she already had and became known as the most important builder in the history of Scania. She owned and managed the estates Sturefors Castle, Krageholm Castle, Björnstorp Castle and Östra Torup. In 1725, she acquired and estate in Andrarum, which she made the biggest producer of Alum in Scania, with 900 employees. She created schools, retirement homes, a prison, a court and hospitals for her employees; she also had a coin factory made, which produced coins with the stamp of her initials, "C.P.", which were only possible to use in the shops at her estate. Upon this estate, she had the Christinehof Castle built in 1740. Christina Piper also had six so called fideikomiss founded, estates which could not be sold but could only be inherited.

== See also ==
- Sofia Drake
