= Ornäs birch =

Species of tree

Betula pendula 'Dalecarlica'
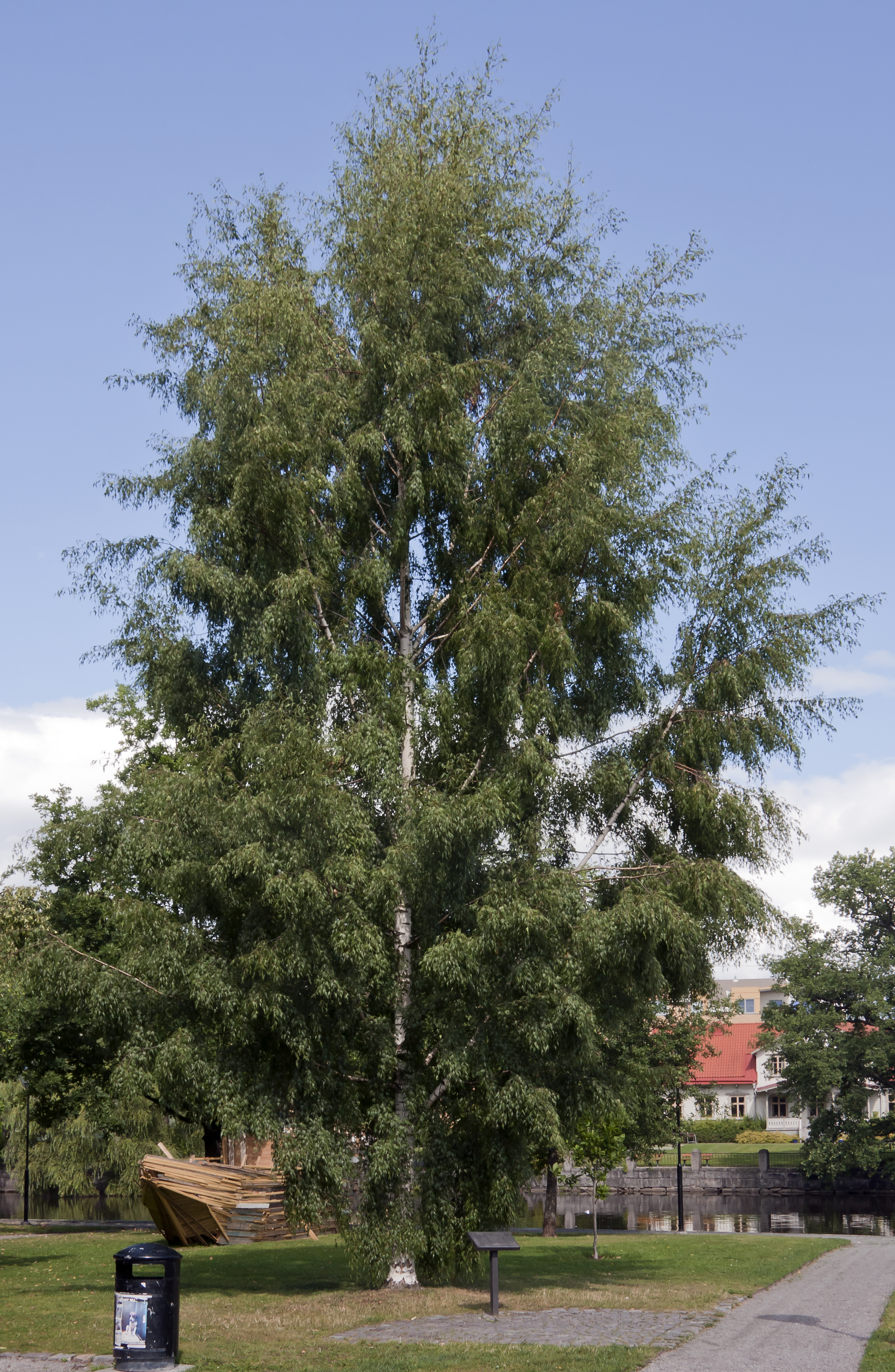
- Ornäs Birch in Örebro
- Species: Betula pendula
- Cultivar: 'Dalecarlica'
- Origin: Sweden

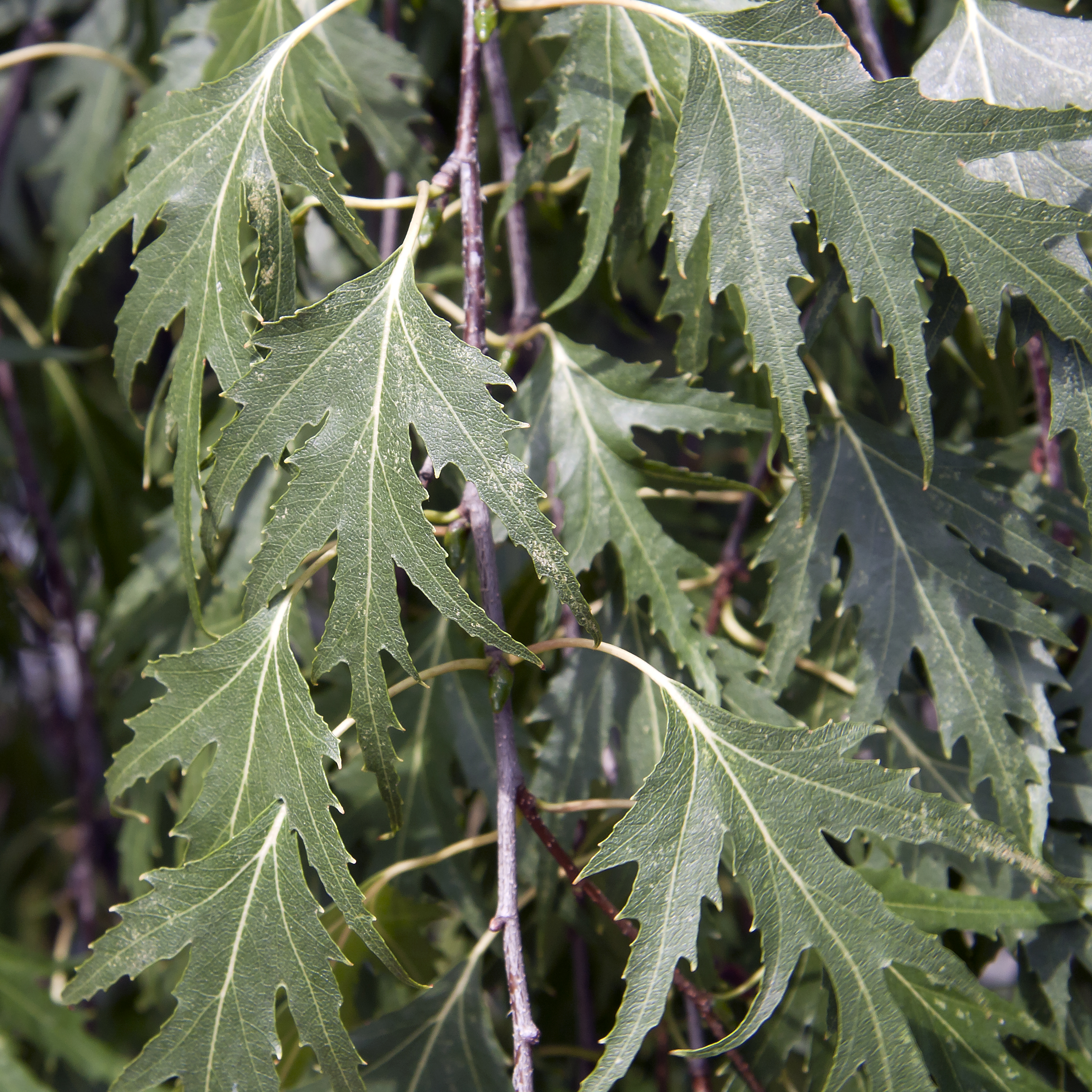
Ornäs birch leaves

The Ornäs birch, (Swedish Ornäsbjörk, Latin Betula pendula 'Dalecarlica') is a variety of silver birch with deeply indented leaves. It is the national tree of Sweden.

== History ==
The original Ornäs birch was discovered in 1767 by Hans Gustaf Hiordt in the village of Ornäs, in the central Swedish province of Dalarna. Hiordt sent a description of the tree to the University of Uppsala botanist Carl Linnaeus. Cuttings were taken from the original tree, from which all Ornäs birch trees have been propagated. The tree fell in a storm on 26 May 1890. Two new trees were planted in its place, taken from cuttings of the original tree. At a later time a third one was added. The location of the trees is 60°31′15″N 15°32′35.5″E

In 1985, the Ornäs birch was named as the national tree of Sweden, and examples have been planted in central locations in many Swedish towns.

In that same year, the first eight Betula pendula 'Dalecarlica' were exported to Pretoria, South Africa, from a nursery in Germany, by an avid tree lover, Karl Ernst Haese.

== Description ==
Ornäs birch trees grow to a height of 20–25 metres (66–82 ft), and have a rounded, somewhat uneven crown. The main branches have an acute angle to the trunk, and only the outermost branches are hanging. The Ornäs birch is often confused with the similar birches Betula pendula 'Crispa' and Betula pendula 'Laciniata', and all three varieties are sometimes sold commercially as "Swedish birch". The genuine Ornäs birch can be distinguished by its growth-form, and in that its leaves are more deeply indented than the other varieties.

Male flowers are absent, so the Ornäs birch can only be propagated from cuttings, or grafting onto normal Betula pendula rootstock. Female flowers are present however, so hybrids can be produced by cross-pollination.

== See also ==
- Birch
