= Andrarum =

Locality in Sweden

Coordinates: 55°43′N 13°59′E

Andrarum is a locality situated in Tomelilla Municipality, Skåne County, Sweden. Christinehof Castle is located in Andrarum. Andrarum Church was built in the 12th century and heavily rebuilt in the 18th century. It contains Baroque furnishings, donated by Christina Piper, and remains of late medieval murals.

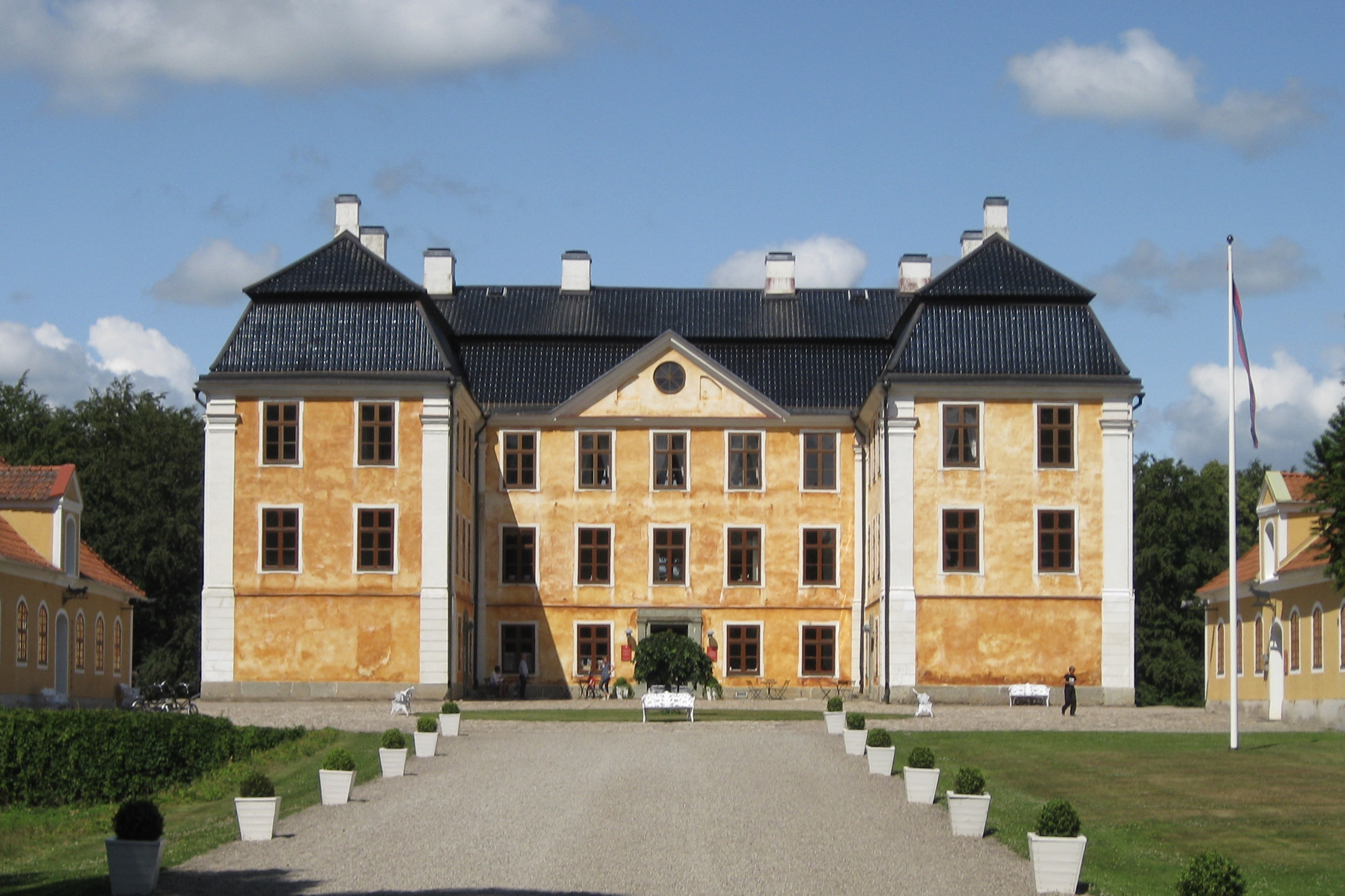
Christinehof

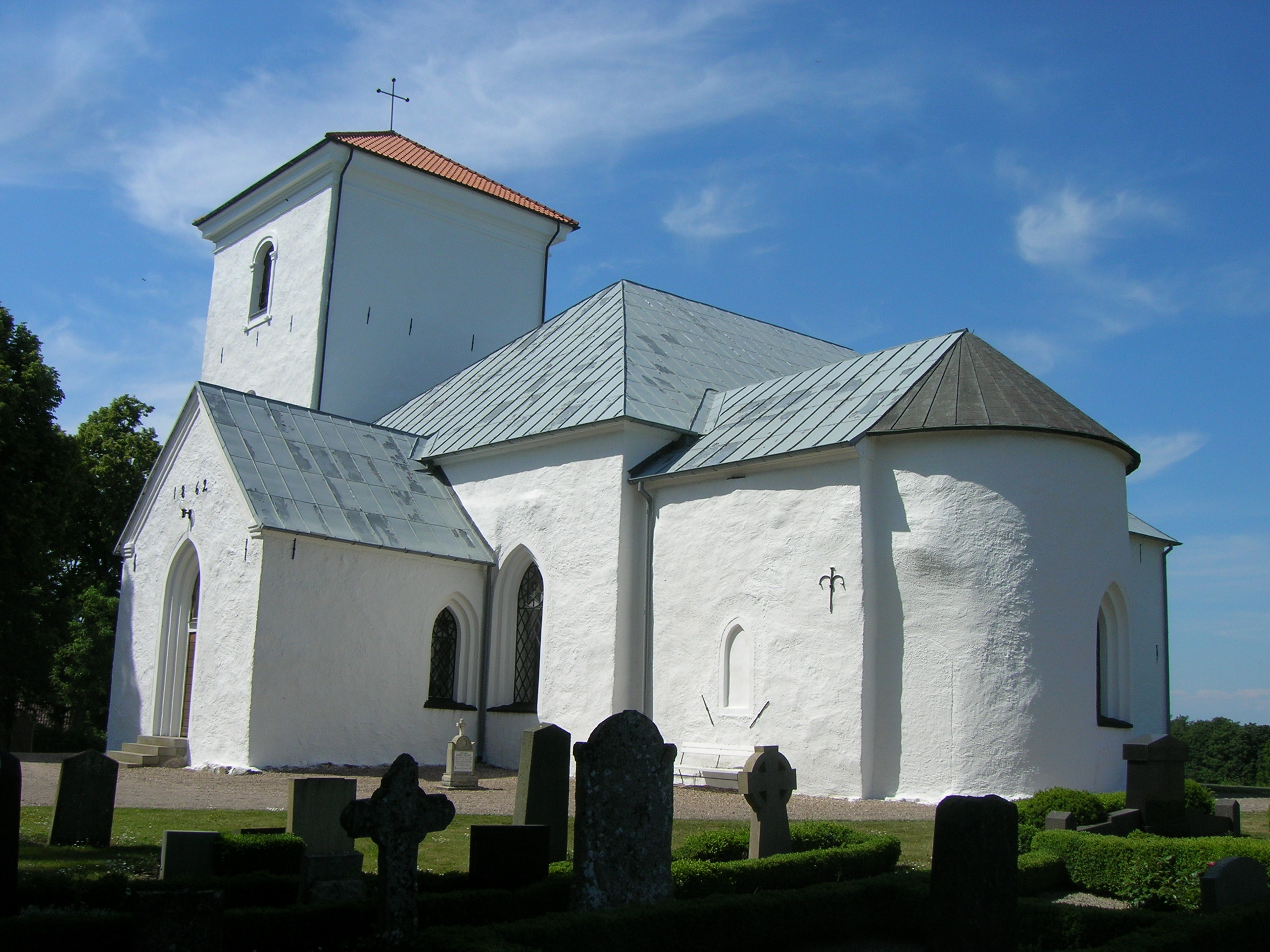
Andrarum Church

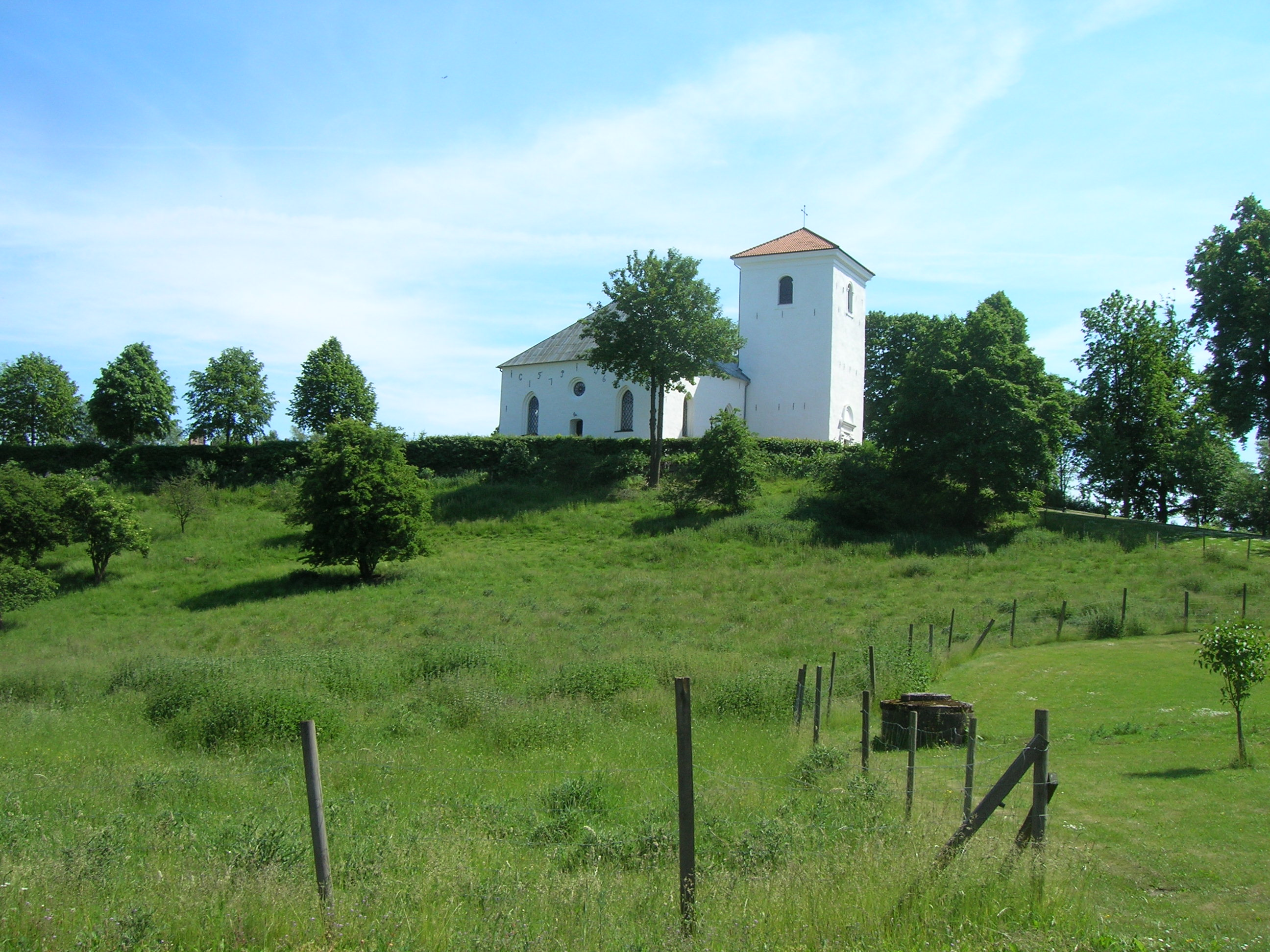

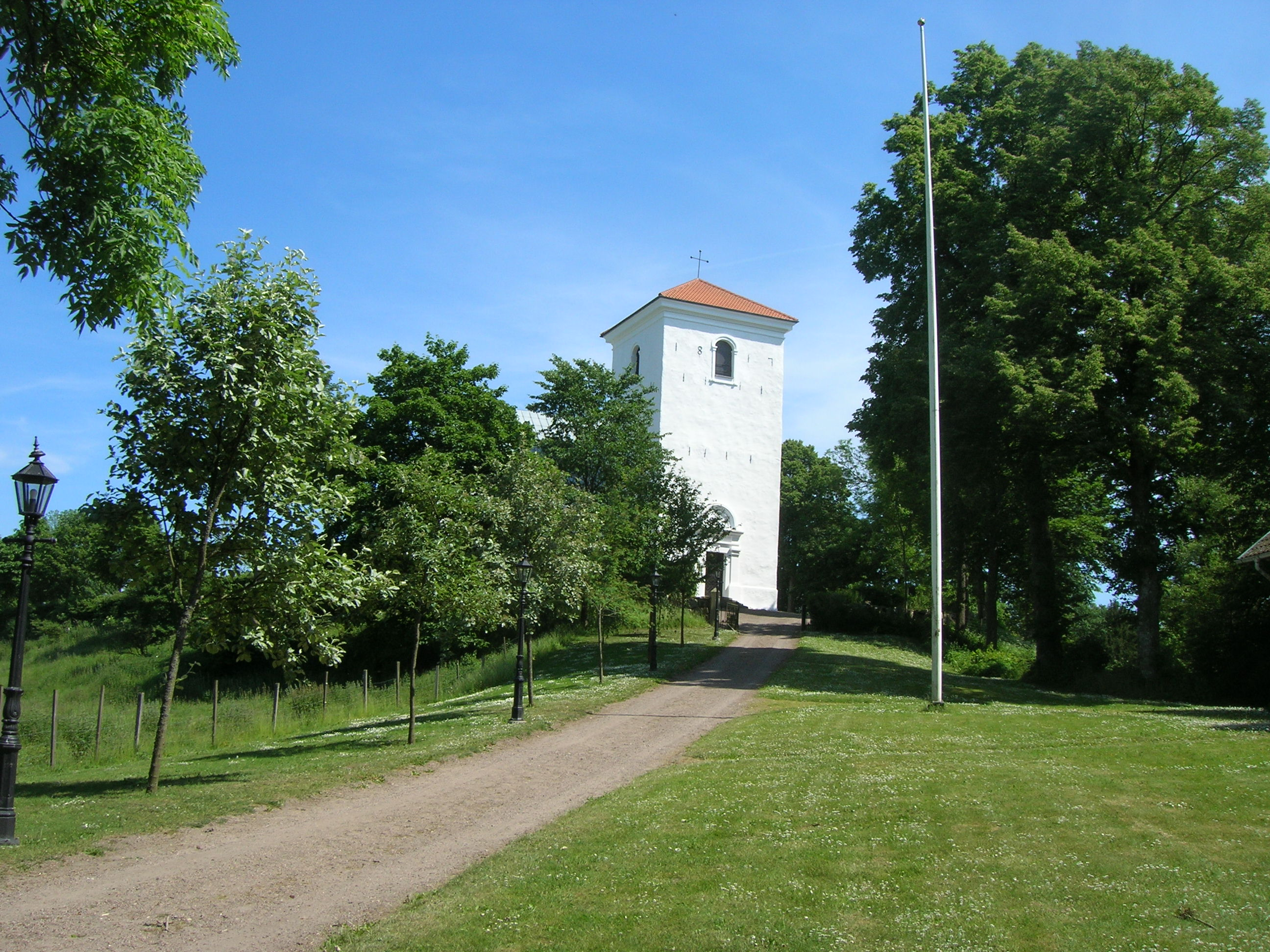
