= Älgö =

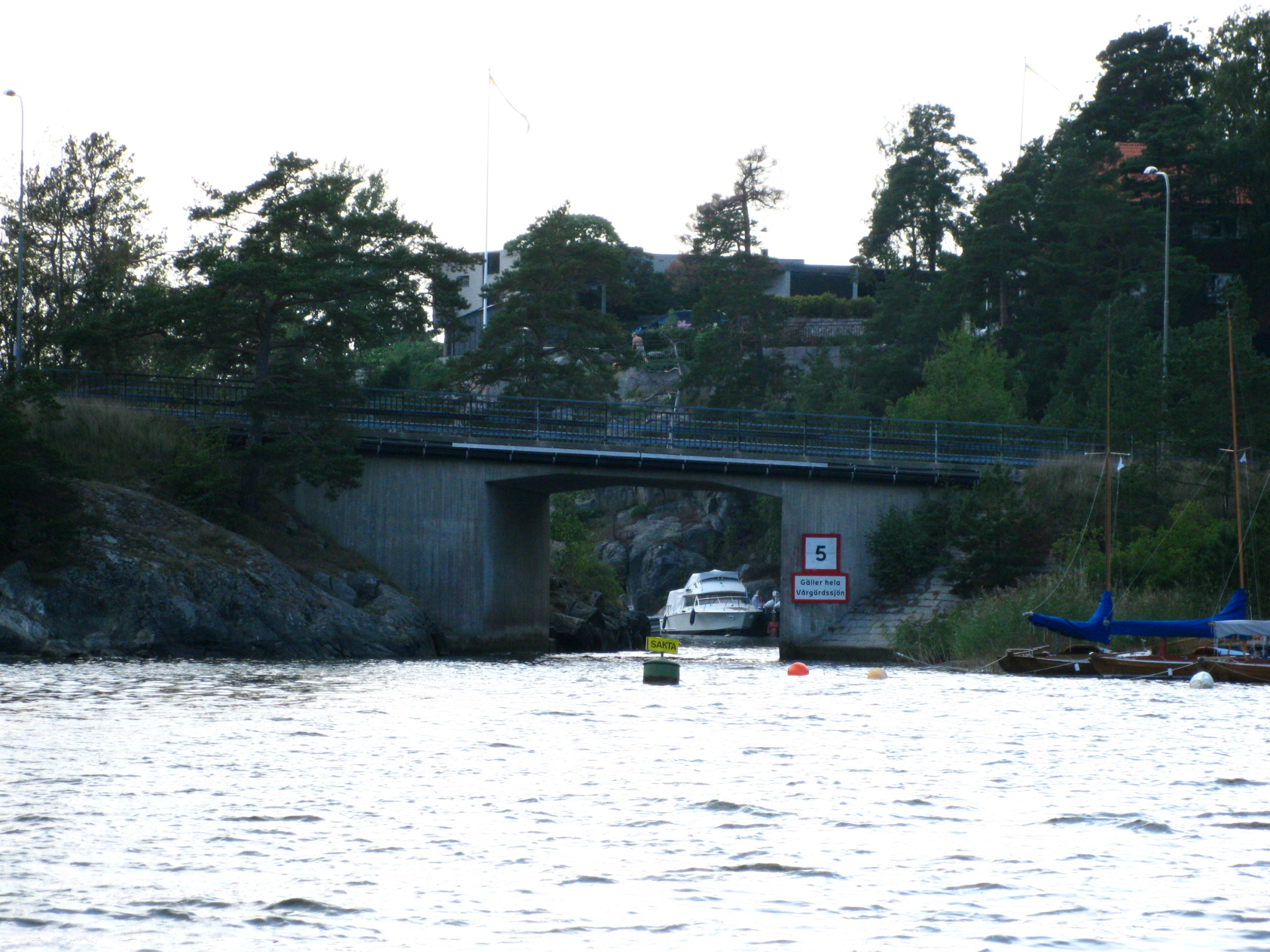

- Location within Stockholm Location within Sweden Location within European Union
- Coordinates: 59°15′55″N 18°20′35″E
- Country: Sweden
- Province: Uppland
- County: Stockholm County
- Municipality: Nacka Municipality

Area
  - Total: 0.201 km^{2} (0.078 sq mi)

Population (31 December 2020)
  - Total: 991
  - Density: 4,930/km^{2} (12,800/sq mi)
- Time zone: UTC+1 (CET)
  - Summer (DST): UTC+2 (CEST)

Älgö is a locality situated in Nacka Municipality, Stockholm County, Sweden. It is also a peninsula next to Saltsjöbaden, in Stockholm Archipelago. Älgö is surrounded by Baggensfjärden, Ingaröfjärden and Erstaviken.

Since 2015, the settlement has been constituted as its own urban area. The town already met the resident requirement for an urban area (200) by a very wide margin, but then had too high a proportion of leisure properties.

== History ==
Älgö, which then belonged to Brännkyrka parish, was mentioned for the first time in 1416 ('in Alghøø') when Katarina Erengisledotter redeemed 2/3 of the island from Kristoffer and Peter Kruse. In a land register for Årsta estates, probably from 1529, a farm on Älgön is occupied. Gabriel Kristersson (Oxenstierna) owned this croft in 1652, which then annually paid 2 öre money, 6 days' work and fodder for three horses in lease. In 1573, two tithe-obliging farmers were recorded on Älgö.
