= Ornäs =

- Location within Dalarna Location within Sweden
- Coordinates: 60°31′N 15°32′E
- Country: Sweden
- Province: Dalarna
- County: Dalarna County
- Municipality: Borlänge Municipality

Area
  - Total: 0.95 km^{2} (0.37 sq mi)

Population (31 December 2010)
  - Total: 1,068
  - Density: 1,126/km^{2} (2,920/sq mi)
- Time zone: UTC+1 (CET)
  - Summer (DST): UTC+2 (CEST)

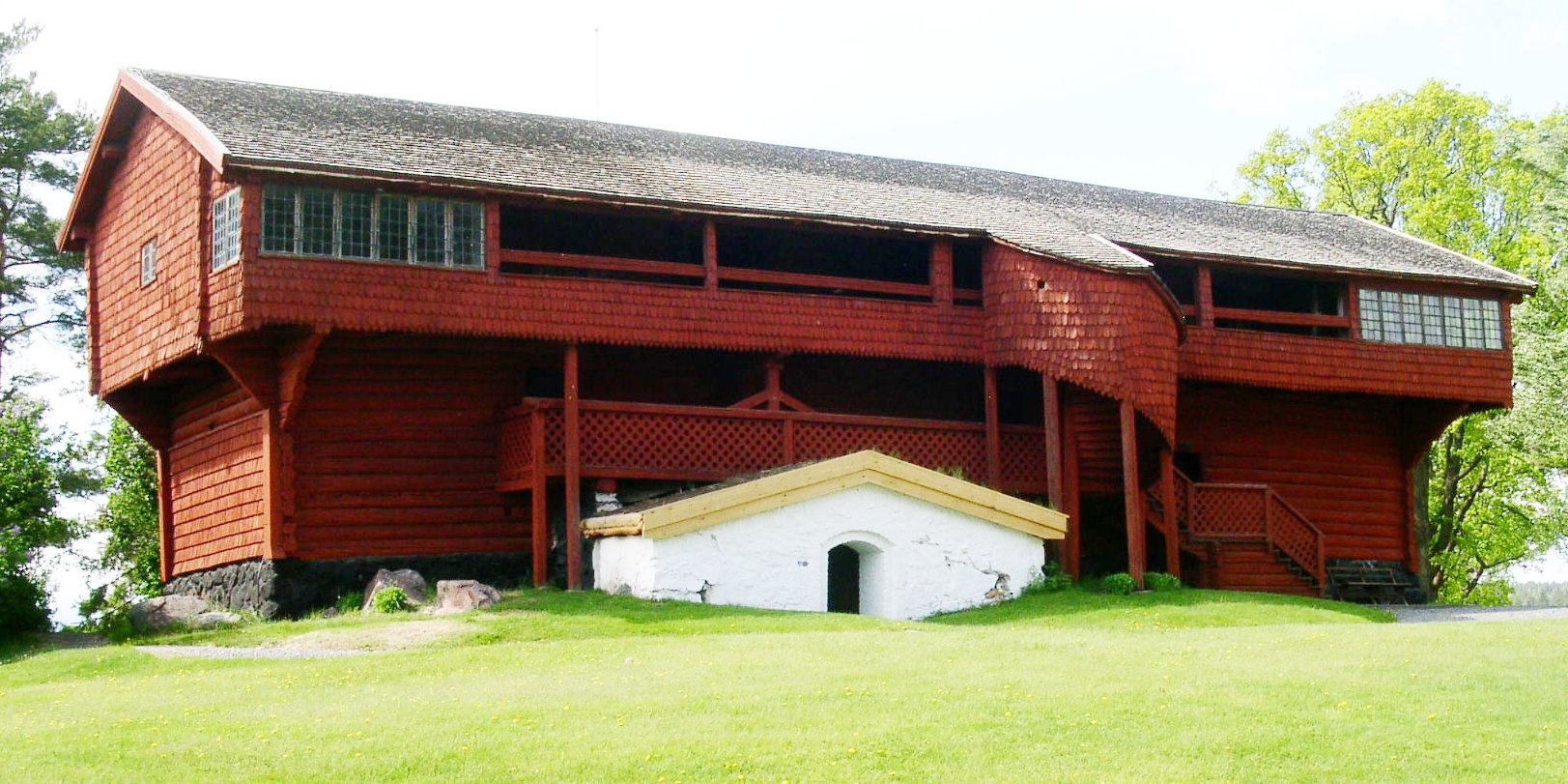
The Ornässtugan Museum

Ornäs is a locality situated in Borlänge Municipality, Dalarna County, Sweden with 1,068 inhabitants in 2010.

== History ==
In November of 1520, Gustav Vasa was hiding in the Ornässtugan when he was chased by the Danish military.

Ornäs has a population around a thousand people. Stora Ornäs was also built in Ornäs.

Barbro Stigsdotter also lived in Ornäs after marrying a Swedish noble.

The Ornäs birch also comes from Ornäs and is the national tree of Sweden.

== See also ==
- Ornäs Birch
