= Carl Piper =

Swedish statesman

His Excellency, Count Carl Piper
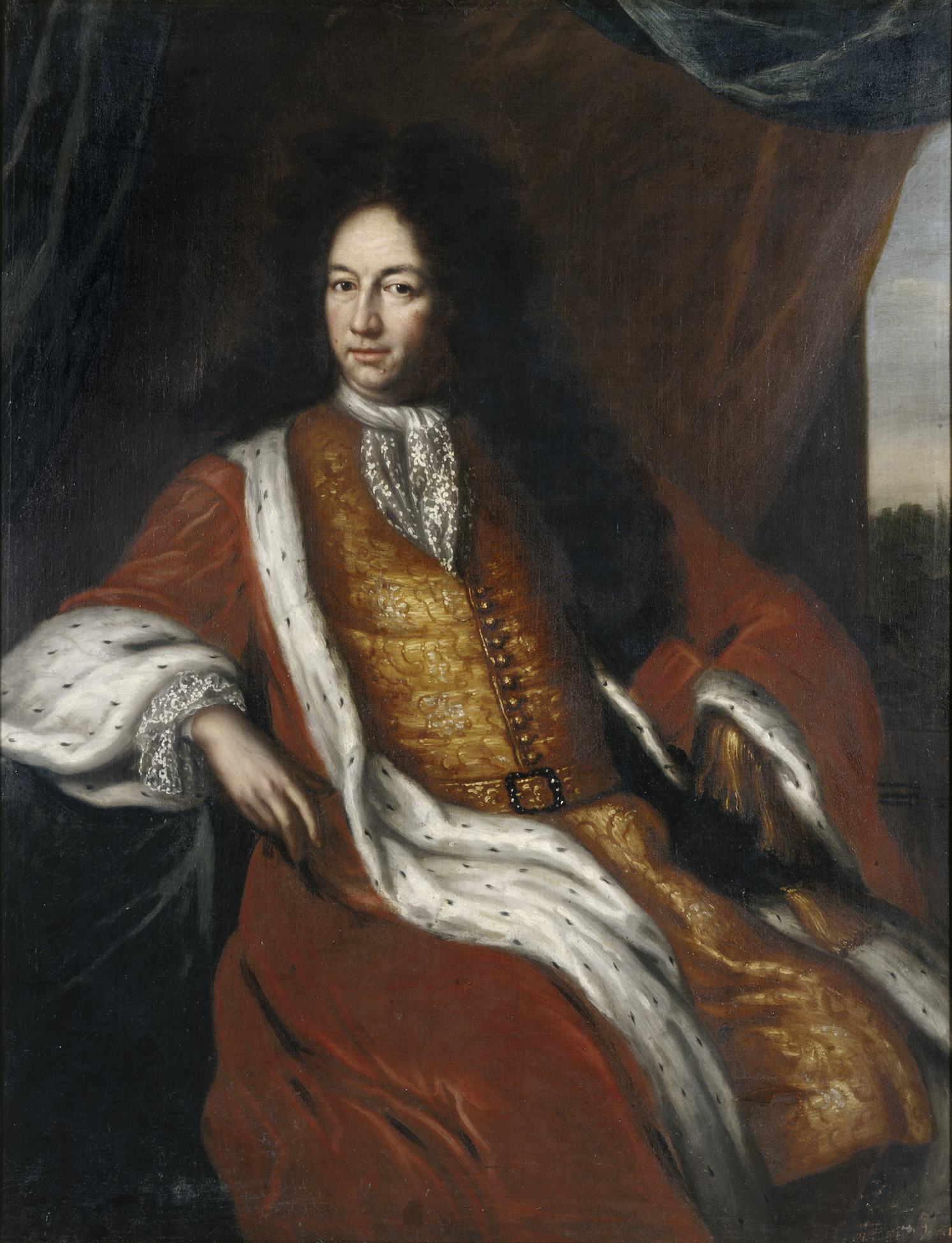
- Portrait by David Kock, after an original painting by David Klöcker Ehrenstrahl.

Marshal of the Realm
- In office October 1705 – 29 May 1716
- Monarch: Charles XII
- Preceded by: Johan Gabriel Stenbock
- Succeeded by: Nicodemus Tessin the Younger

Chancellor of Uppsala University
- In office 29 August 1702 – 29 May 1716
- Monarch: Charles XII
- Preceded by: Bengt Gabrielsson Oxenstierna
- Succeeded by: Arvid Horn

Royal Councilor and Minister
- In office 31 December 1697 – 29 May 1716
- Monarch: Charles XII

State Secretary
- In office 14 March 1689 – October 1705
- Monarch: Charles XI

Personal details
- Born: 29 July 1647 Stockholm, Sweden
- Died: 29 May 1716 (aged 68) Schlüsselburg, Russia
- Spouse(s): Christina Törne (m. 13 February 1690)
- Children: 9
- Parent(s): Carl Piper; Ingrid Charlotta Ekenbom

Count Carl Piper (July 29, 1647, Stockholm – May 29, 1716, Schlüsselburg) was a Swedish statesman. He entered the foreign office after completing his academical course at Uppsala, accompanied Bengt Gabrielsson Oxenstierna on his embassage to Russia in 1673, and attracted the attention of Charles XI during the Scanian War with his extraordinary energy and ability.

== Life ==
Carl Piper was the son of Carl Piper and Ingrid Charlotta Ekenbom. On 13 February 1690, he was married to Christina Törne; they had nine children of which only five survived past early childhood.

In 1679, he was appointed secretary to the board of trade and ennobled. In 1689, he was made one of the secretaries of state, and Charles XI recommended him on his deathbed to his son and successor, Charles XII. Piper became the most confidential of the new sovereign's ministers. In 1697 he was made a senator and set over domestic affairs while still retaining his position as state-secretary.

In 1698, he was made a count. In 1702 he was appointed chancellor of Uppsala University, and during the first half of the Great Northern War, as the chief of Charles' perambulating chancellery. It was his misfortune, however, to be obliged to support a system which was not his own.

He belonged to the school of Bengt Gabrielsson Oxenstierna and was therefore an avowed advocate of a pacific policy. He protested in vain against nearly all the military ventures of Charles XII; these included the war against Augustus II in Poland, the invasion of Saxony, and the campaign into Ukraine. Again and again, he insisted that the pacific overtures of Peter the Great should at least be fairly considered, but his master was always immovable. Piper's career came to an end with the Battle of Poltava (1709), where he was among the prisoners. The last years of his life were spent in captivity in Russia. He died in Schlüsselburg Fortress in 1716.
