= Carl Gyllenstierna =

17th-century Swedish statesman and nobleman

- Count of Steninge
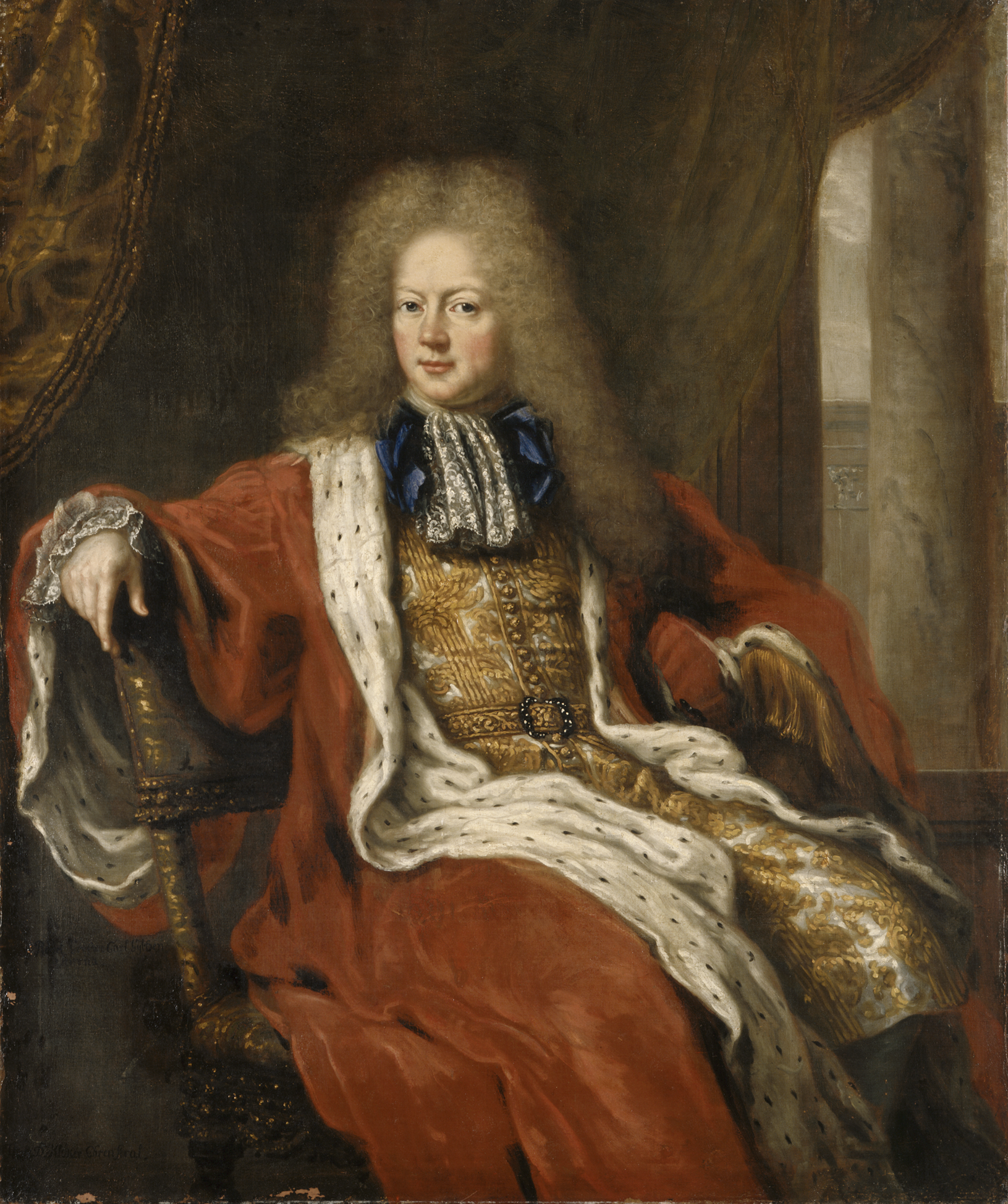
- Portrait by David Klöcker Ehrenstrahl

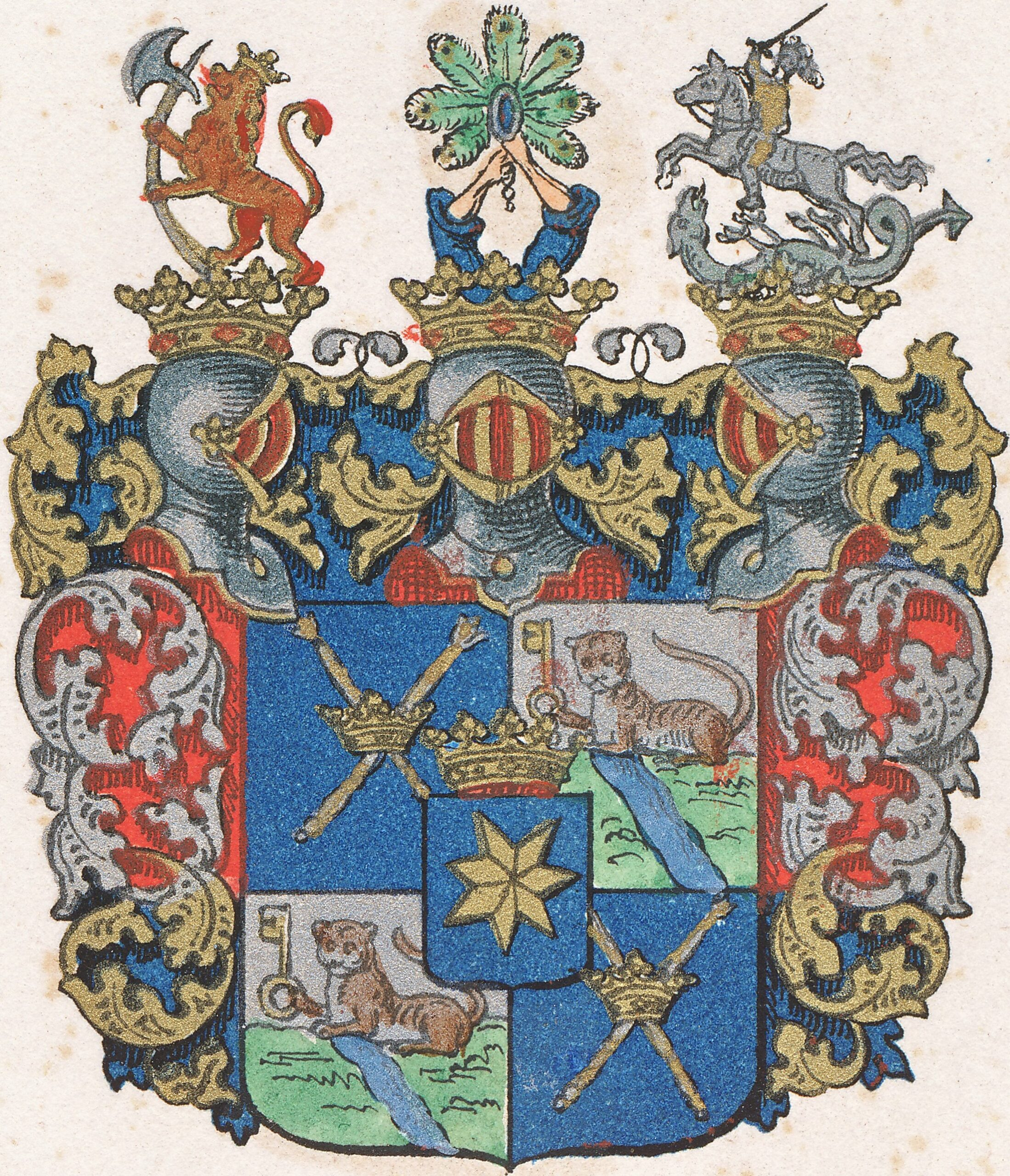
- Coat of arms
- Full name: Carl Gyllenstierna of Steninge
- Other titles: Baron of Limmared; Lord of Älgö, Bjälkesta, Ornäs, and Yxkullshof.
- Born: Carl Eriksson Gyllenstierna; February 4, 1649
- Died: June 6, 1723 (aged 74); Stockholm, Sweden
- Family: Gyllenstierna
- Wife: Anna Maria Soop (m. 1706)
- Issue: None
- Father: Erik Karlsson Gyllenstierna
- Mother: Beata von Yxkull
- Occupation: Landowner, statesman

Carl Gyllenstierna (4 February 1649 – 6 June 1723) was a Swedish statesman, and nobleman. He is best remembered for his service to Dowager Queen Hedwig Eleonora, and for constructing Steninge Palace.

Throughout his career, Gyllenstierna held several high ranking positions within the Swedish government. He was created Count of Steninge in 1687.

== Early life ==
Carl Gyllenstierna was born 4 February 1649 to Erik Karlsson Gyllenstierna and Beata von Yxkull of the noble Uexküll family. Some notable siblings of his were Conrad Gyllenstierna and Christopher Gyllenstierna. He was born into the noble Gyllenstierna family. In 1657, Gyllenstierna enrolled in Uppsala University and in 1666, he enrolled in Heidelberg University.

== Career ==
In 1668, Gyllenstierna was made Chamberlain to Dowager Queen Hedwig Eleonora and in 1672, he was made Chief Chamberlain. A year after being made Chief Chamberlain, he was appointed Chief Stablemaster.

In 1676, the Dowager Queen Hedwig Eleonora sent Gyllenstierna to King Charles XI who was fighting the Scanian War. The Dowager Queen had instructed Gyllenstierna to stay close to the King and give her frequent reports on the war. Simultaneously, she asked Field Marshal Simon Grundel-Helmfelt and General Rutger von Ascheberg to recommend Gyllenstierna.

Upon the wedding of Charles XI and Princess Ulrika Eleonora in 1679, Gyllenstierna was sent by the Dowager Queen to Copenhagen. In Copenhagen, Gyllenstierna delivered the Dowager Queen's gifts and congratulation to the Princess.

When Gyllenstierna had returned from Copenhagen, the Dowager Queen's governor of her dower, Gustaf Soop had passed away. The Queen Dowager appointed him as Soop's successor. Charles XI expressed doubt reagrding Gyllenstierna's suitability for the governorship, given that he was young and had not yet been tested in major administrative roles. It took the Dowager Queen 4 months to have Gyllenstierna appointed. Contemporaries speculated that the relationship between the two could have been more than platonic.

As the governor of the dower, Gyllenstierna managed large parts of Östergötland; Södermanland, and Västmanland with Gripsholm, Eskilstuna and Strömsholm as centres. In addition, he also managed Vadstena Castle, Svartsjö Palace, Drottningholm Palace and an estate in Livonia for the Dowager Queen.

In 1687, Gyllenstierna was made Count of Steninge and a member of the Privy Council of Sweden. In the same year, he was also made a member of the Liquidation Commission for the Great Reduction.

In 1695, the grain harvests were poor and copper sales and prices fell, which were important for the revenue of the dower estates. The Queen Dowager had previously taken out significant loans — including from the National Bank, and creditors were showing concern. The outbreak of the Great Northern War in 1700 only worsened the situation.

In 1697, Gyllenstierna was appointed President of the Chamber Revision, a predecessor to the Svea Court of Appeal. He was also made acting president of the Chamber College and the State Treasury.

In 1700, following the outbreak of the Great Northern War, Gyllenstierna was made member of the Defence Commission. In 1711, he resigned from the Chamber College.

The Queen Dowager's death in 1715 freed Gyllenstierna from the dower estate's financial burdens and he worked to liquidate her estate.

In 1718, Gyllenstierna was appointed president of the Svea Court of Appeal and in 1719, he was made the chancellor of Turku Academy.

== Estates ==
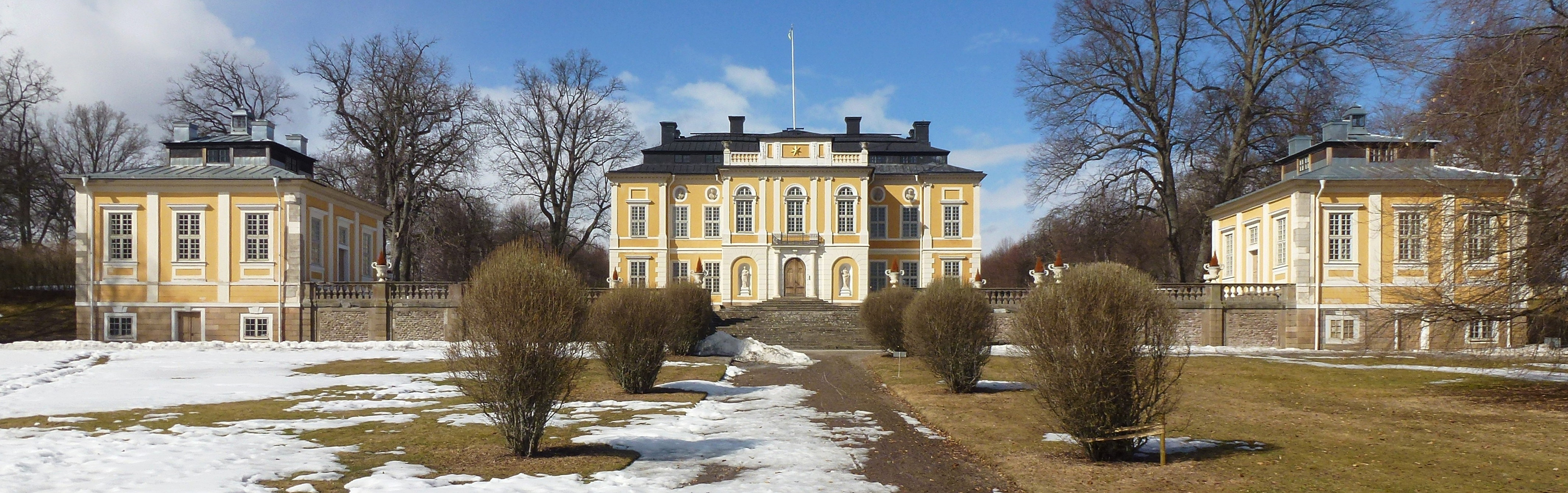
Steninge Palace

Gyllenstierna's primary seat was Steninge. However, he also had many other estates spread across Sweden.

In addition to Steninge, he held several other significant titles and properties:

- Baron of Limmared.
- Lord of Älgö, Bjälkesta, Ornäs, and Yxkullshof.

== Personal life and death ==
Contemporary accounts described Gyllenstierna as good looking, personable and popular with women. He is also described as lacking profundity and zeal.

In 1682, through the Dowager Queen, Gyllenstierna unsuccessfully proposed to Magnus Gabriel De la Gardie's youngest daughter.

In 1706, Gyllenstierna married Baroness Anna Maria Soop in her second marriage. Soop was previously married to Baron Axel Wachtmeister until he passed away in 1699. The marriage did not bear children.

On June 6, 1723, Gyllenstierna passed away in Stockholm. With his death, the comital Gyllenstierna af Steninge family went extinct.

Gyllenstierna is buried in Ytterselö Church with his wife.
