= Bengt Gabrielsson Oxenstierna =

Swedish soldier and statesman (1623–1702)

Count Bengt Gabrielsson Oxenstierna
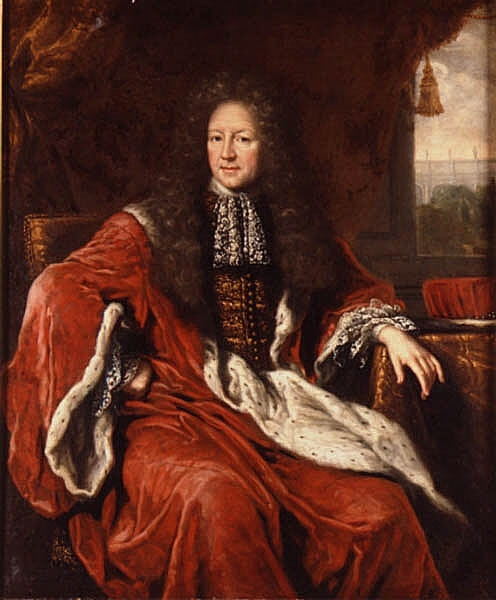
- Portrait, 1690

Minister for Foreign Affairs (President of the Court of Chancery)
- In office 1680–1697
- Monarch: Charles XI of Sweden

Ambassador to Vienna
- In office 1674–1676

Governor-General of Livonia
- In office 1662–1666

Personal details
- Born: 16 July 1623 Stockholm, Sweden
- Died: 12 July 1702 (aged 78) Stockholm, Sweden
- Resting place: Uppsala Cathedral, Sweden
- Spouse(s): Eva Juliana Wachtmeister; Magdalena Stenbock
- Children: 18
- Parent(s): Gabriel Bengtsson Oxenstierna (1586–1656); Anna Gustafsdotter Banér (1585-1656)
- Occupation: Diplomat and soldier

Count Bengt Gabrielsson Oxenstierna (1623–1702) was a Swedish soldier and statesman who served as Foreign Minister from 1680 to 1697. He ensured Sweden's neutrality during this period and moved the country away from its traditional alliance with France.

== Life ==
Bengt Gabrielsson Oxenstierna was born in Stockholm on 16 July 1623. He was the eldest surviving son of Gabriel Bengtsson Oxenstierna.

He was married twice to Eva Juliana Wachtmeister (1639-1666), then Magdalena Stenbock; the two marriages produced 18 children in all, but only nine of them lived to maturity. His marriage to Eva Juliana connected Oxenstierna to Hans and Axel Wachtmeister, senior Swedish noblemen who were both anti-French.

His second wife, Magdalena, came from one of the leading families of Sweden. She was an intelligent and influential individual in her own right and often acted as his political colleague.

== Career ==
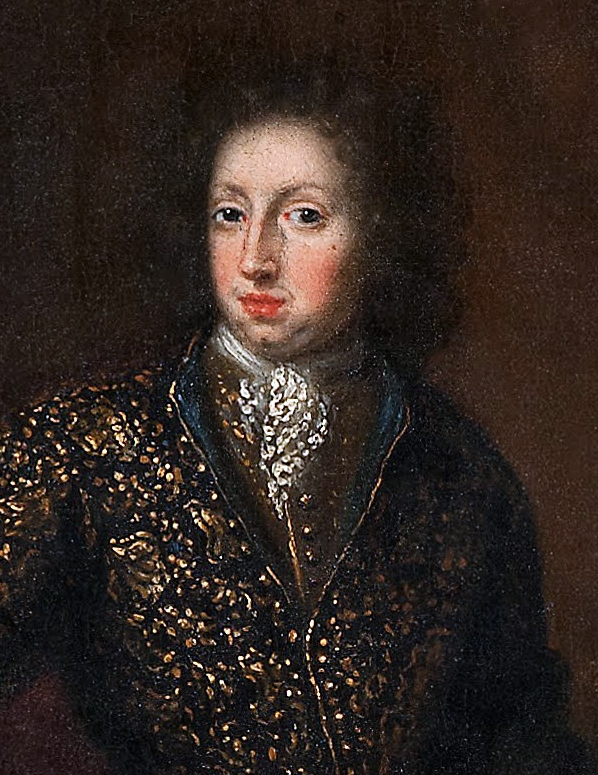
Charles XI of Sweden, ca 1691

After being educated abroad, Oxenstierna began his diplomatic career at the discussions which led to the 1648 Peace of Westphalia that ended the Thirty Years' War. During this time, he became a trusted confidant of the future Charles X of Sweden. Two years after Charles became king in 1652, Oxenstierna represented Sweden at the Lower Saxon Circle.

When the Second Northern War began in 1655, he took part in the Swedish invasion of the Polish–Lithuanian Commonwealth and became governor of the newly-conquered Duchy of Livonia. In July 1658, he commanded the garrison of Thorn, now Toruń when it was besieged by an Imperial/Polish force, surrendering in December; he later helped negotiate the peace of Oliva that ended the war.

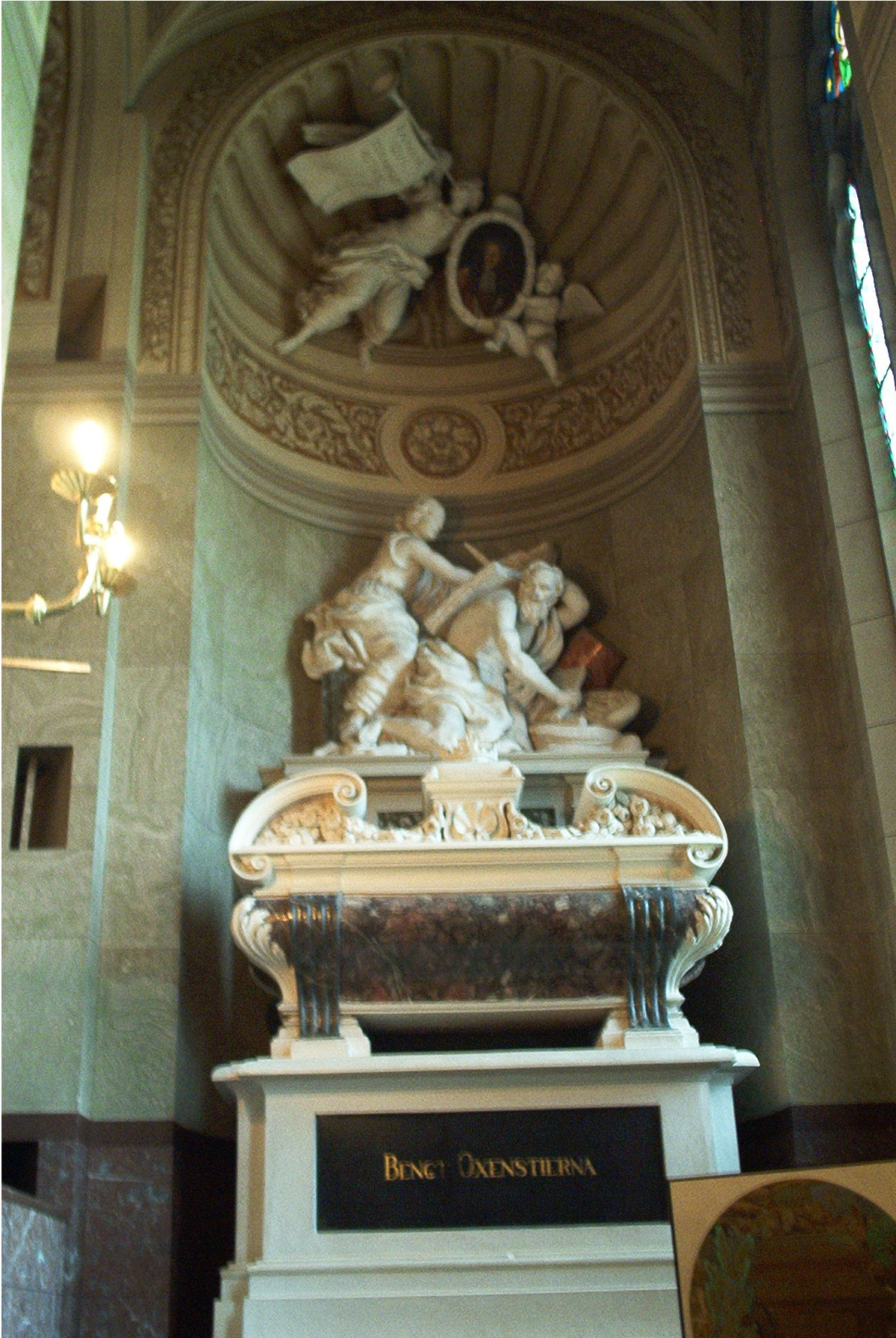
Oxenstierna's memorial, Uppsala Cathedral

Oxenstierna generally supported closer relations between Sweden and the Holy Roman Empire, placing him in opposition to the pro-French faction headed by Magnus de la Gardie. When Charles X died in 1660, his son Charles XI of Sweden was four years old and ruled through a regency; Oxenstierna was sidelined by De la Gardie and served as governor-general of Livonia from 1662 to 1666.

He recovered some influence when Charles XI attained his majority in 1672 and was ambassador to Austria from 1674 to 1676. While there, he presented a 'Memorial' or paper to Emperor Leopold titled The case of the persecuted and oppressed Protestants in some parts of Germany and Hungary, which was later published in London. During the 1675 to 1679 Scanian War, most of Swedish Pomerania was captured by Brandenburg-Prussia and Denmark-Norway. Oxenstierna helped negotiate the 1679 Saint-Germain-en-Laye, which restored most of these losses.

When his chief minister Johan Göransson Gyllenstierna died in 1680, Charles appointed Oxenstierna President of the Court of Chancery, a position that traditionally controlled foreign policy. A contemporary observed that their personalities were very different, describing Oxenstierna as 'sluggish and formal' but that both shared a passion for horses. They also believed Sweden needed peace to restore its economy and society, a guiding principle followed for 17 years.

Oxenstierna moved Sweden away from its traditional pro-French alliance, instead following a policy of friendship with England, the Dutch Republic and the Holy Roman Empire. This policy ensued in the 1681 Treaty of the Hague between Sweden, the Dutch Republic and Emperor Leopold, although he ensured Sweden remained neutral from 1688 to 1697 Nine Years War.

As President of the Court of Chancery, he was also de facto Minister of Culture, approving all publications; author and military engineer Erik Dahlbergh (1625-1703) dedicated several books to him.

When Charles XI died in 1697, Oxenstierna was one of the regents during the minority of his son Charles XII of Sweden, a talented soldier of great energy and ambition. Charles was drawn into the Great Northern War in 1700, and Oxenstierna retired from office; he died in July 1702 and was buried in Uppsala Cathedral. The 1911 Encyclopædia Britannica describes him as "a shrewd and subtle little man, of gentle disposition, but remarkable for his firmness and tenacity of character."

== Sources ==
- Frost, Robert (1993). After the Deluge: Poland-Lithuania and the Second Northern War, 1655-1660. Cambridge University Press. ISBN 978-0521420082.
- Lindstrom, Peter; Norrhem, Svante (2013). Flattering Alliances: Scandinavia, Diplomacy & the Austrian-French Balance of Power, 1648-1740. Nordic Academic Press. ISBN 978-9187351075.
- Nordin, Jonas (2019). Roling, Bernd (ed.). Boreas Rising: Antiquarianism and National Narratives in 17th- And 18th-Century Scandinavia. de Gruyter. ISBN 978-3110632453.
- Upton, AF (1998). Charles XI and Swedish Absolutism, 16601697 (Cambridge Studies in Early Modern History). Cambridge University Press. ISBN 978-0521573900.
