= 1784 in Sweden =

- Years in Sweden: 1781 1782 1783 1784 1785 1786 1787
- Centuries: 17th century · 18th century · 19th century
- Decades: 1750s 1760s 1770s 1780s 1790s 1800s 1810s
- Years: 1781 1782 1783 1784 1785 1786 1787

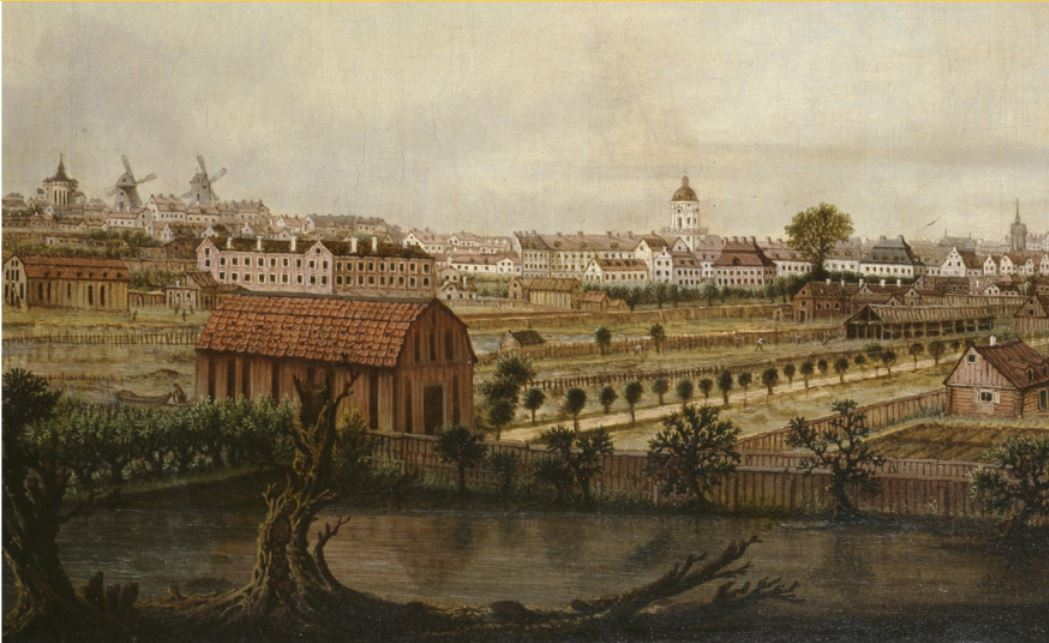
Stora barnhuset 1784

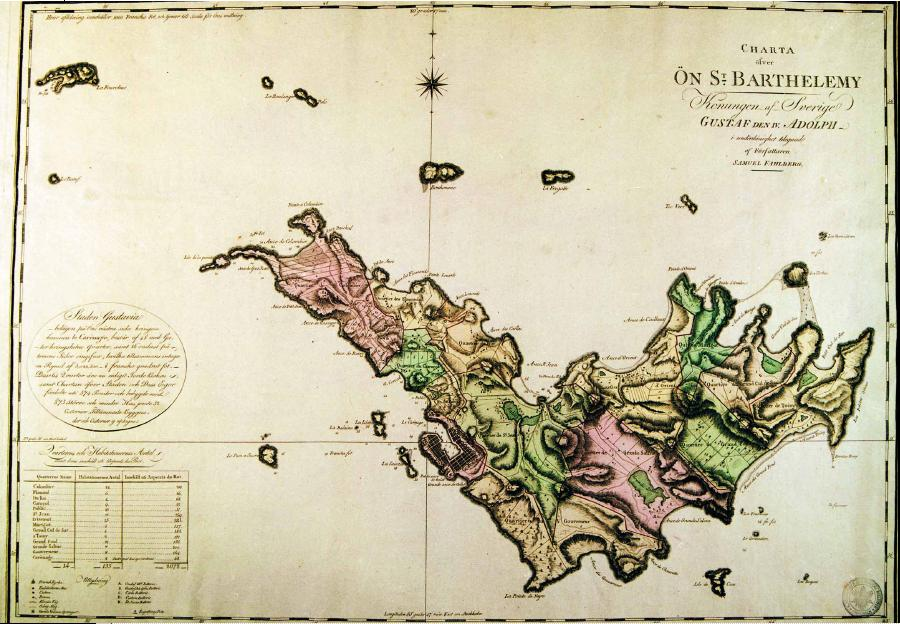
Saint-Barthélemy

Events from the year 1784 in Sweden

== Incumbents ==
- Monarch – Gustav III

== Events ==
- 1 July - Alliance treaty between Sweden and France: Sweden are given Saint-Barthélemy as a colony.
- August - Gustav III returns to Sweden.
- - Vänersborg Church is inaugurated.
- - The Illis Quorum is created.
- - Inauguration of the Stenborg Theatre.

== Births ==
- March 24 - Johan Gabriel Richert, jurist (died 1864)
- 21 August - Charlotta Berger, writer (died 1852)
- 23 August - Henriette Löfman, composer (died 1836)
- 31 August - Jeanette Wässelius, opera singer (died 1853)
- 15 October - Hans Olof Holmström, bishop (died 1855)
- 17 November - Julia Nyberg, poet (died 1854)
- 21 November - Gustaf Wilhelm Finnberg, painter (died 1833)

== Deaths ==
- 14 February - Charlotta Löfgren, poet (born 1720)
- 12 March - Henrik af Trolle, commander (born 1730)
- 18 September - Georg Haupt, cabinet maker (born 1741)
- Brita Laurelia, publicist, book printer, and poet (born 1712)
- Helena Ehrenmalm, landowner (born 1730)
