= 1649 in Sweden =

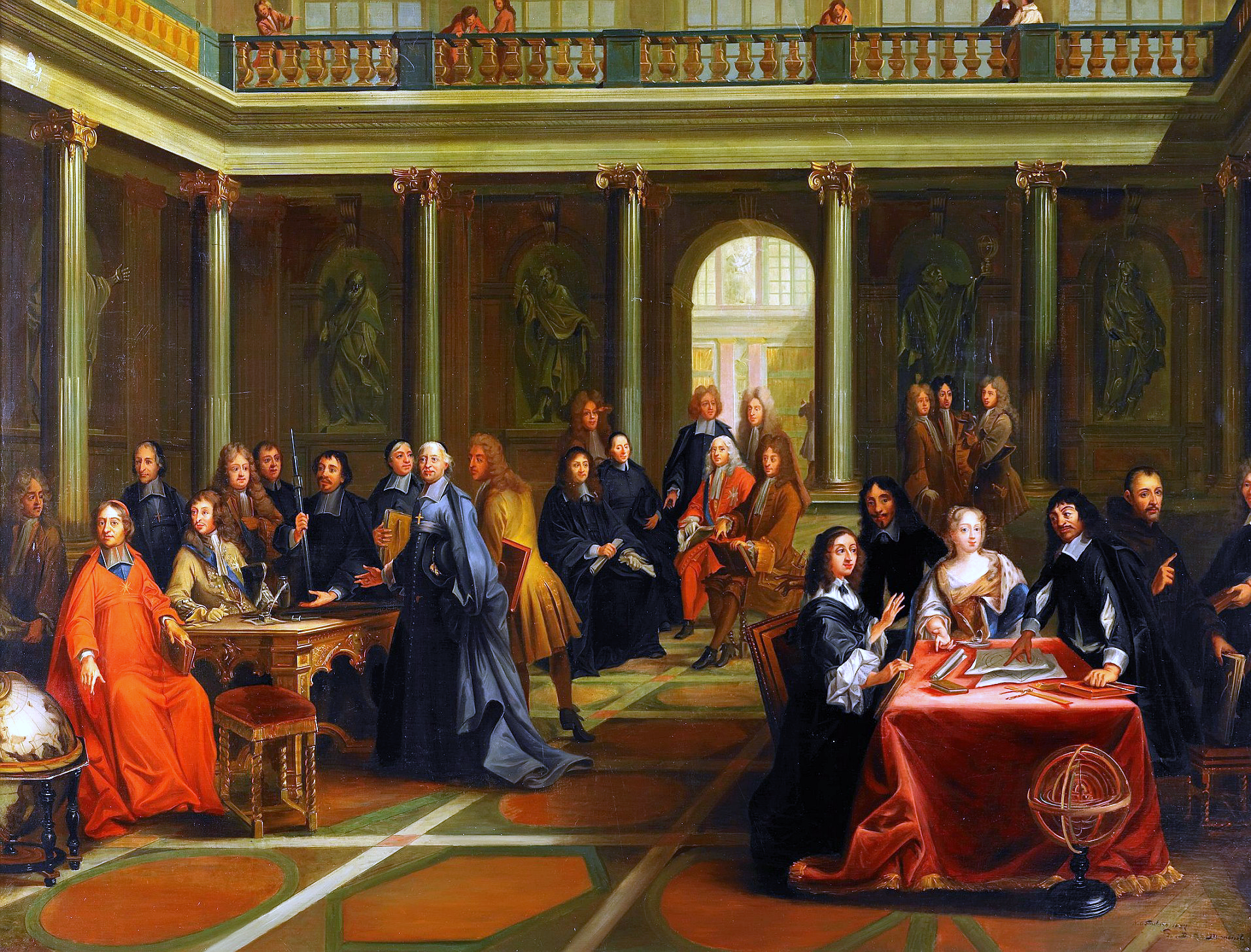
Dispute of Queen Cristina and René Descartes

Events from the year 1649 in Sweden

== Incumbents ==
- Monarch – Christina

== Events ==
- René Descartes arrives in Sweden.
- Swedish Africa Company is founded.
- A new school regulation is created, including the introduction of Pedagogium, Trivial school and Gymnasium Gymnasium.
- The public net of transportation is re-organised.
- Långholmens spinnhus is founded.

== Births ==
- Christina Eleonora Drakenhielm, convert (died 1712)
- Magdalena Stenbock, politically active countess and salon holder (died 1727)

== Deaths ==
- Constantia Eriksdotter, illegitimate daughter of Eric XIV of Sweden and Agda Persdotter (born 1560)
