= Eriksdotter =

Eriksdotter (daughter of Erik) may refer to:

- Anna Eriksdotter (Bielke) (1490–1525), Swedish noble, commander of the city and castle of Kalmar during the Swedish rebellion against Denmark
- Astrid Eiriksdotter (born c. 925), Queen consort of Viken, Norway in the 10th century
- Barbro Eriksdotter (died 1553), known as Barbro Påle, Swedish noble and landowner
- Constantia Eriksdotter (1560–1649), the illegitimate daughter of Eric XIV of Sweden and Agda Persdotter
- Ebba Eriksdotter Vasa (1491–1549), Swedish noblewoman
- Inger Eriksdotter (1100–1157), the wife of Asser Rig, tribal chief of Zealand (Sjælland) in today's Denmark
- Ingeborg Eriksdotter of Denmark, Danish princess, Queen of Norway (c. 1244 – 1287)
- Ingeborg Eriksdotter of Sweden (c. 1212 – c. 1254), princess and duchess, daughter of King Eric X of Sweden, mother of King Valdemar I of Sweden
- Katarina Eriksdotter (12th-century), Swedish princess, daughter of King Eric the Saint and his queen, Christina of Sweden
- Lisa Eriksdotter (born 1733 in Kalanti), Finnish preacher of the Rukoilevaisuus (Great Awakening)
- Margareta Eriksdotter (1516–1551), Queen of Sweden from 1536 to 1551 by marriage to King Gustav I
- Margareta Eriksdotter Vasa (1497–1536), Swedish noblewoman, sister of king Gustav I of Sweden
- Martha Eriksdotter (Märta Bonde), alleged daughter of Erik X, King of Sweden, flourishing in the first half of the 13th century
- Ragnhild Eriksdotter (died c. 984), daughter of Eric Bloodaxe and his wife, Gunnhild
- Sigrid Eriksdotter Vasa (1566–1633), Swedish princess, the legitimized daughter of King Eric XIV of Sweden and Karin Månsdotter
- Valborg Eriksdotter (1545–1580), the royal mistress of Magnus, Duke of Östergötland, between 1560 and 1567
- Virginia Eriksdotter (1559–1633), Swedish noble
