= 1712 in Sweden =

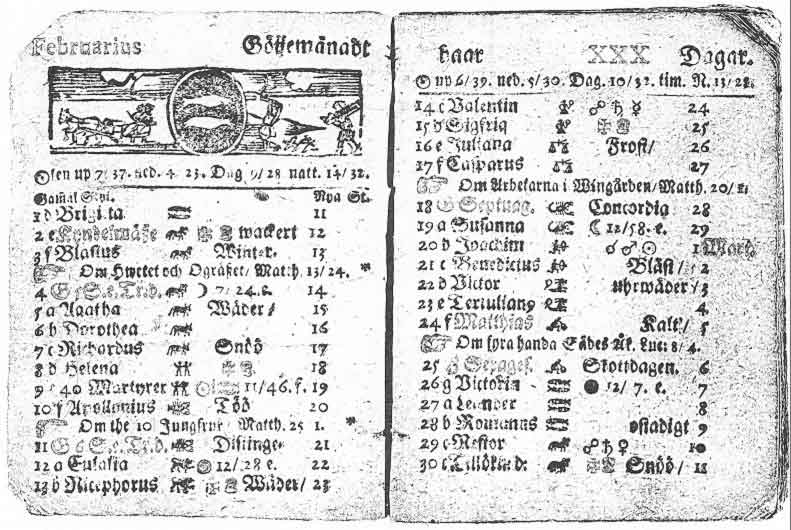
Swedish calendar for February 1712

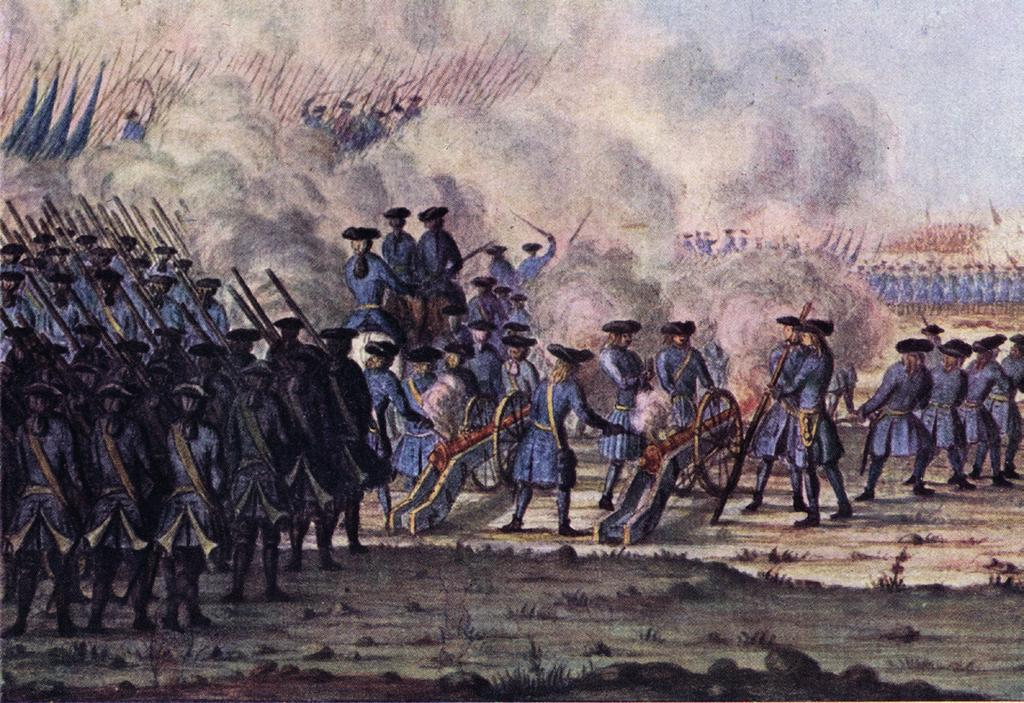
Battle of Gadebusch

Events from the year 1712 in Sweden.

== Incumbents ==
- Monarch – Charles XII

== Events ==
- February 30 – Sweden temporarily adopts February 30 as a day to adjust the Swedish calendar back to the Julian calendar.
- September 9 – Danish frigate Hejren (1683) is sunk in battle by Vita Örn (1711), commanded by Swedish Captain Printz
- December 9 – Battle of Gadebusch: Sweden defeats Denmark and Saxony.
- The queen dowager's favorite Anna Catharina von Bärfelt is arrested and tried.

== Births ==
- March 31 - Anders Johan von Höpken, politician (died 1789)
- July 19- Carl Fredrik Mennander, archbishop (died 1786)
- Peter Lindahl, actor (died 1792)
- Sophia Schröder, concert soprano (died 1750)
- Brita Laurelia, publicist, book printer, and poet (died 1784)

== Deaths ==
- Juliana Schierberg, royal favorite (birth year unknown)
- Christina Eleonora Drakenhielm, Catholic convert (born 1649)
