= 1674 in Sweden =

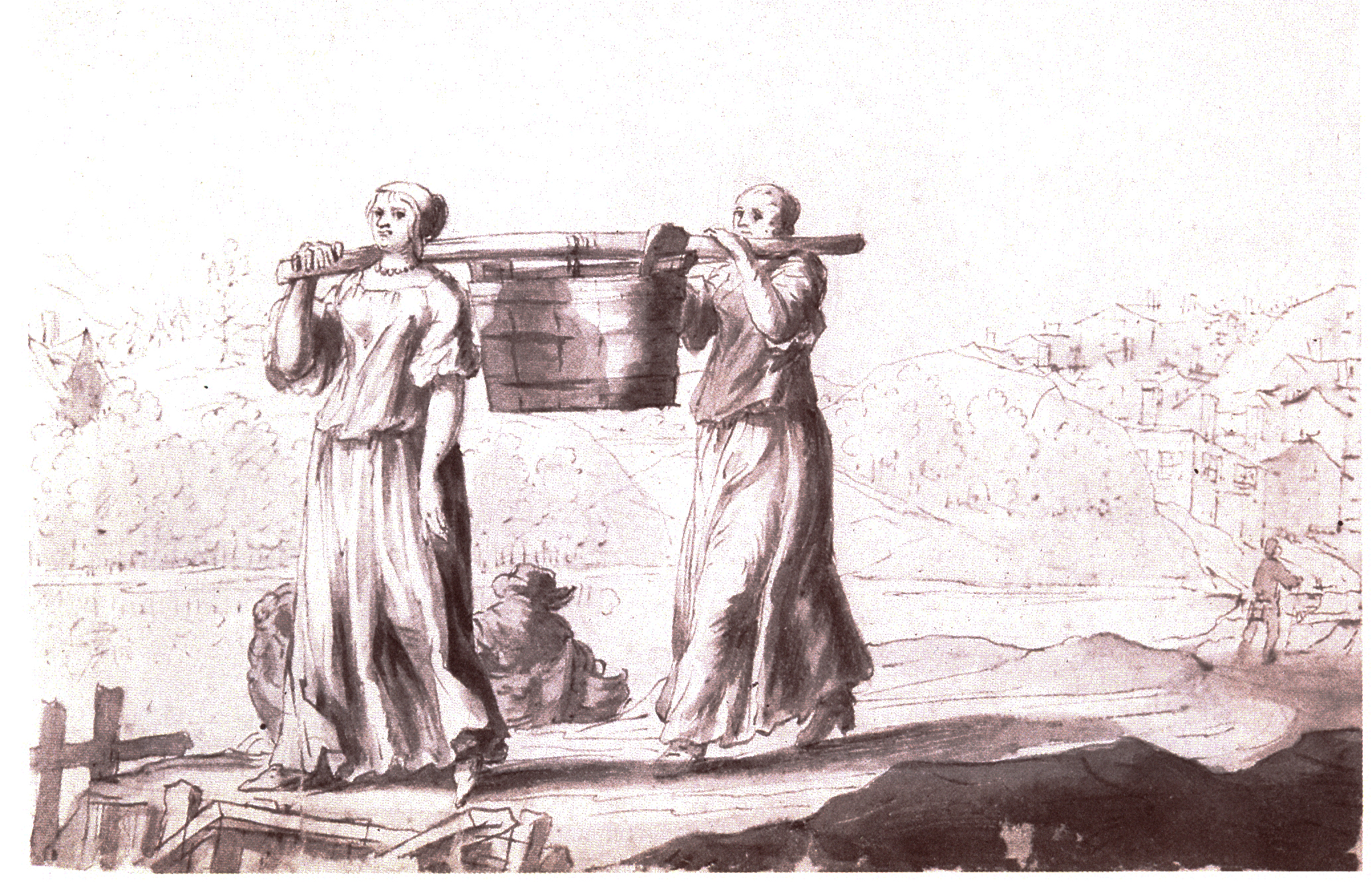
A latrine, 17th century

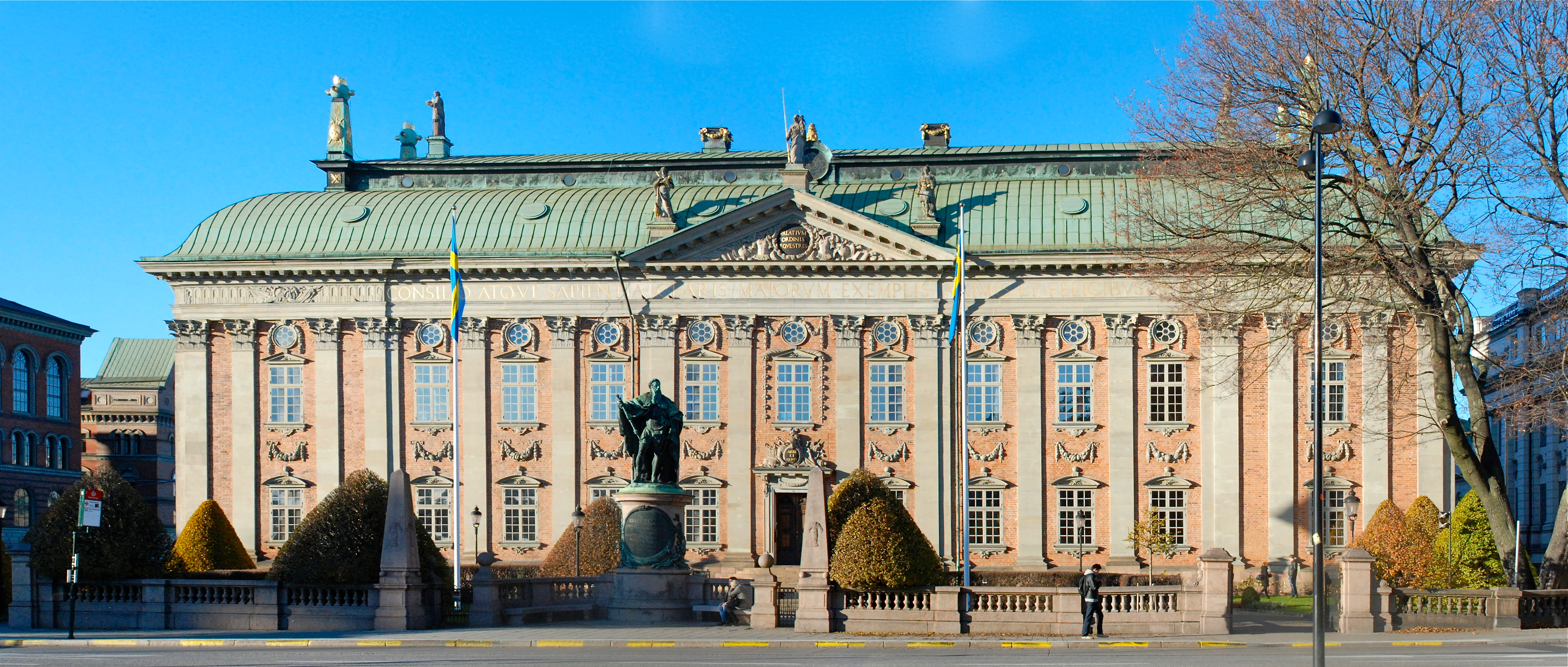
The House of Nobility, from south, with statue of Gustaf Eriksson Vasa.

This is a list of notable events that occurred in Sweden in the year 1674.

== Incumbents ==
- Monarch – Charles XI

== Events ==
- In accordance with the treaty with France, Sweden invades Brandenburg.
- Lorenzo Magalotti publishes his book about his travel in Sweden, Sverige under år 1674.
- The fortifications of Landskrona by Erik Dahlbergh is completed.
- Gustav Düben publishes his composition of the poem of Samuel Columbus, Odæ Sveticæ.
- De jure sveonum et gothorum vetusto by Johan Stiernhöök.
- Foundation of the eldest auction chamber in Stockholm: Stockholms Auctions- och Adresse Cammare.
- The building of the Swedish House of Lords in Stockholm is completed.

== Births ==
- 14 April - Magnus Julius De la Gardie, general and politician (died 1641)

== Deaths ==
- 5 January - Ebba Brahe, landowner and the love interest of Gustavus Adolphus (born 1596)
- Lucidor, poet (born 1638)
- Beata Rosenhane, poet, scholar and early feminist (born 1738)
- Erik Gabrielsson Emporagrius, professor and bishop (born 1606)
