= 1606 in Sweden =

- Years in Sweden: 1603 1604 1605 1606 1607 1608 1609
- Centuries: 16th century · 17th century · 18th century
- Decades: 1570s 1580s 1590s 1600s 1610s 1620s 1630s
- Years: 1603 1604 1605 1606 1607 1608 1609

Events from the year 1606 in Sweden

== Incumbents ==
- Monarch – Charles IX

== Events ==
- March - The Riksdag of the Estates is summoned to Örebro. The main topic is the claim to the Swedish throne from the Polish monarch Sigismund III Vasa and the Counter-Reformation which his accession is feared to signify.
- - Foundation of the city of Vaasa in Finland.
- - Prince John is appointed Duke of Östergötland.

== Births ==
- - Erik Gabrielsson Emporagrius, professor and bishop (born 1674)
- - Arvid Wittenberg, count, field marshal and privy councillor (died 1657)
