= 1730 in Sweden =

Events from the year 1730 in Sweden

== Incumbents ==
- Monarch – Frederick I

== Events ==
- 23 March - Personal union between Sweden and Landgraviate of Hesse-Kassel until 1751.
- The first issue of the paper Sedo-lärande Mercurius.

== Births ==
- - Peter Jonas Bergius, medical doctor and botanist (died 1790)
- - Dorothea Maria Lösch, sea captain and war heroine (died 1799)
- - Helena Ehrenmalm, landowner (died 1784)

== Deaths ==
- 14 September – Sophia Elisabet Brenner, poet (born 1659)
- 17 September - Axel Gyllenkrok
