= 1559 in Sweden =

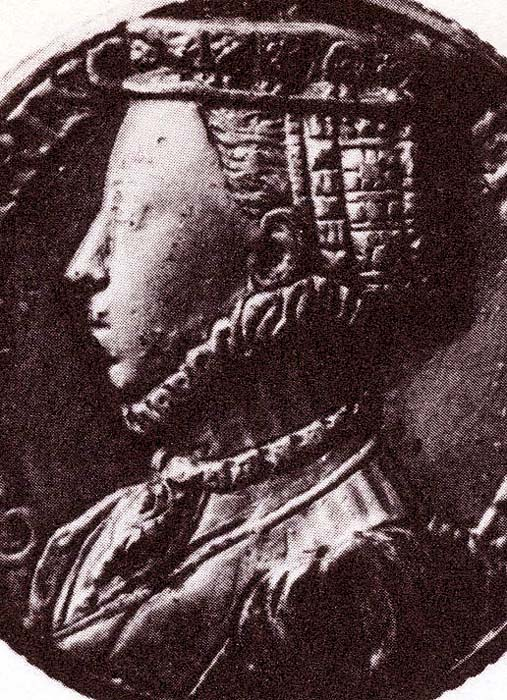
Princess Cecilia of Sweden

Events from the year 1559 in Sweden

== Incumbents ==
- Monarch – Gustav I

== Events ==
- 11 September - Duke John is sent to England to negotiate the wedding between Queen Elizabeth and Prince Erik.
- 13 December - Wedding between Princess Catherine and Edzard II, Count of East Frisia. A great scandal takes place when Princess Cecilia of Sweden and Johan II of East Frisia is discovered to have an illegal sexual relationship, known as Vadstena Rumble.
- - The king and his sons make a solemn entry in to the capital.

== Births ==
- January 1 - Virginia Eriksdotter, illegitimate royal daughter (died 1633)
- July 2 - Margareta Brahe, courtier (died 1638)

== Deaths ==
- January - Christina Gyllenstierna, national heroine (died 1497)
- 25 January - Christian II of Denmark and Sweden (born 1481)
