= 1633 in Sweden =

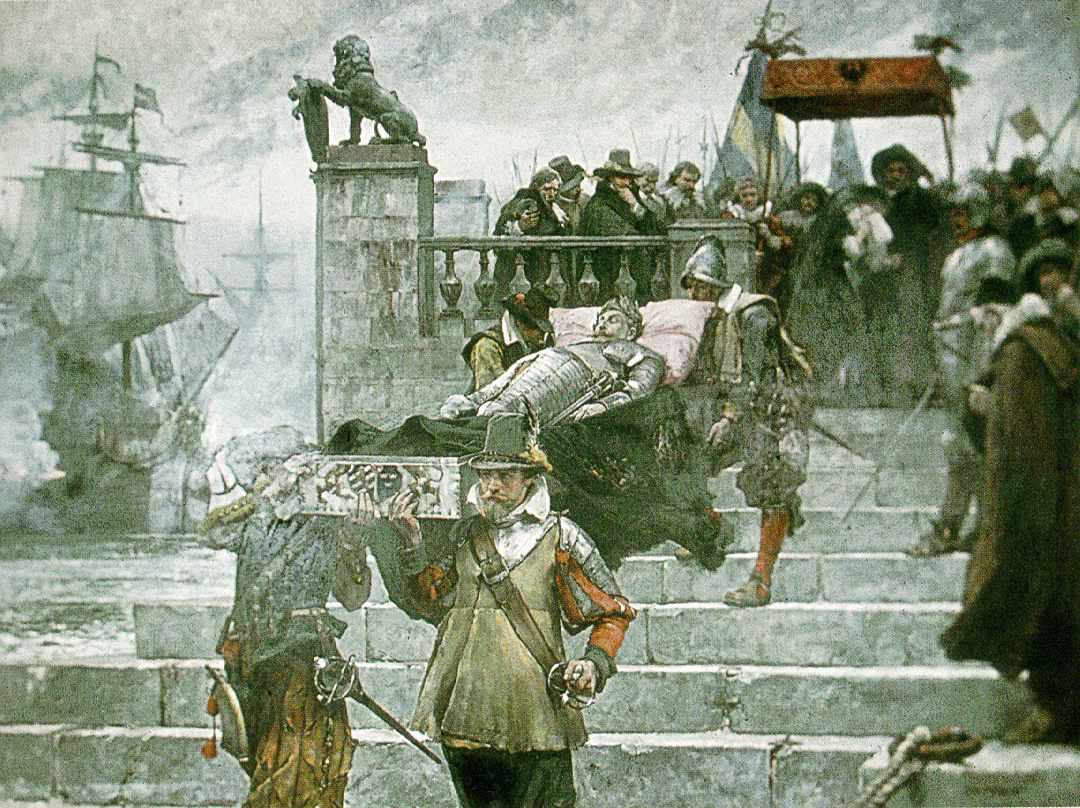

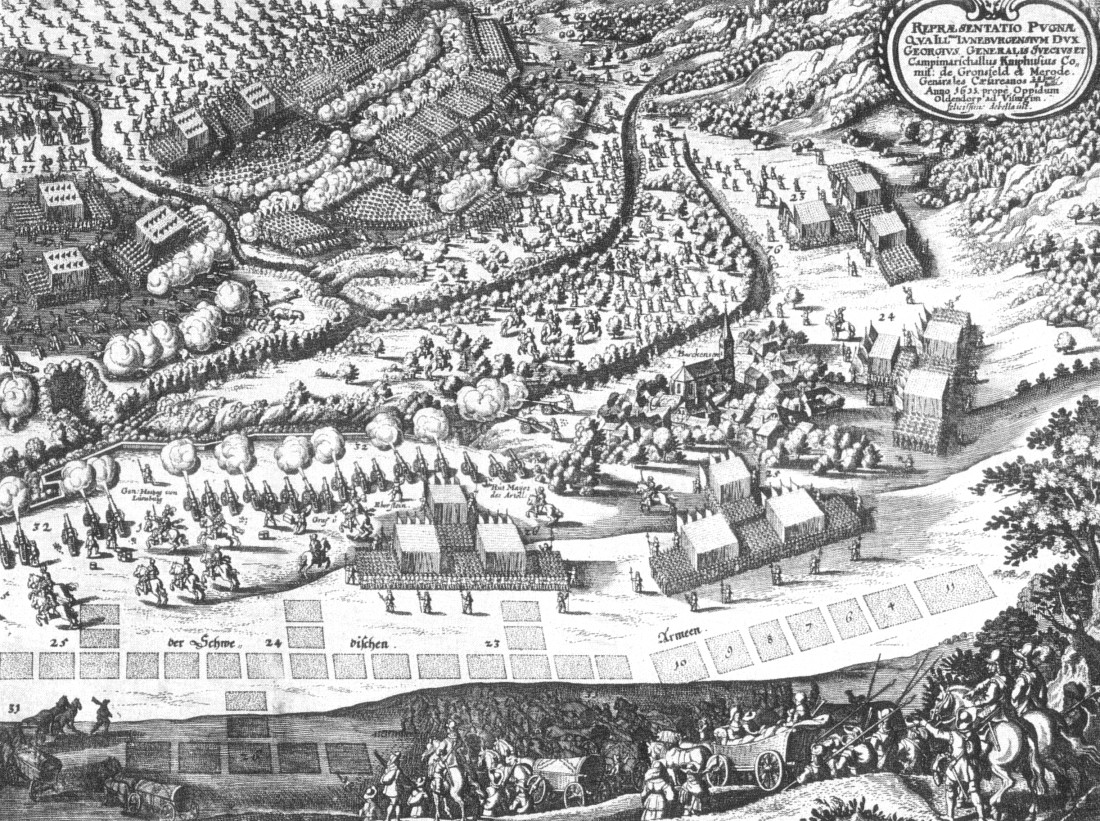
An artists representation of an overhead view of the battle and the belligerents positions.

Events from the year 1633 in Sweden

== Incumbents ==
- Monarch – Christina

== Events ==
- Axel Oxenstierna appointed Sweden's ambassador in Germany for three years.
- Alliance between Sweden and the Protestant states of south-west Germany.
- Swedish victory at Battle of Oldendorf
- Swedish victory at Battle of Pfaffenhofen.
- Swedish defeat at Battle of Steinau.
- Swedish occupation of Regensburg.
- Foundation of the Allmänna Barnhuset.

== Births ==
- Anna Gyllander, impostor (died unknown year)

== Deaths ==
- 3 March – Magnus Brahe, Lord High Constable and Lord High Steward (born 1564)
- 24 April – Sigrid of Sweden (1566–1633), princess (born 1566)
- Virginia Eriksdotter, illegitimate daughter of Erik XIV (born 1559)
