= 1560 in Sweden =

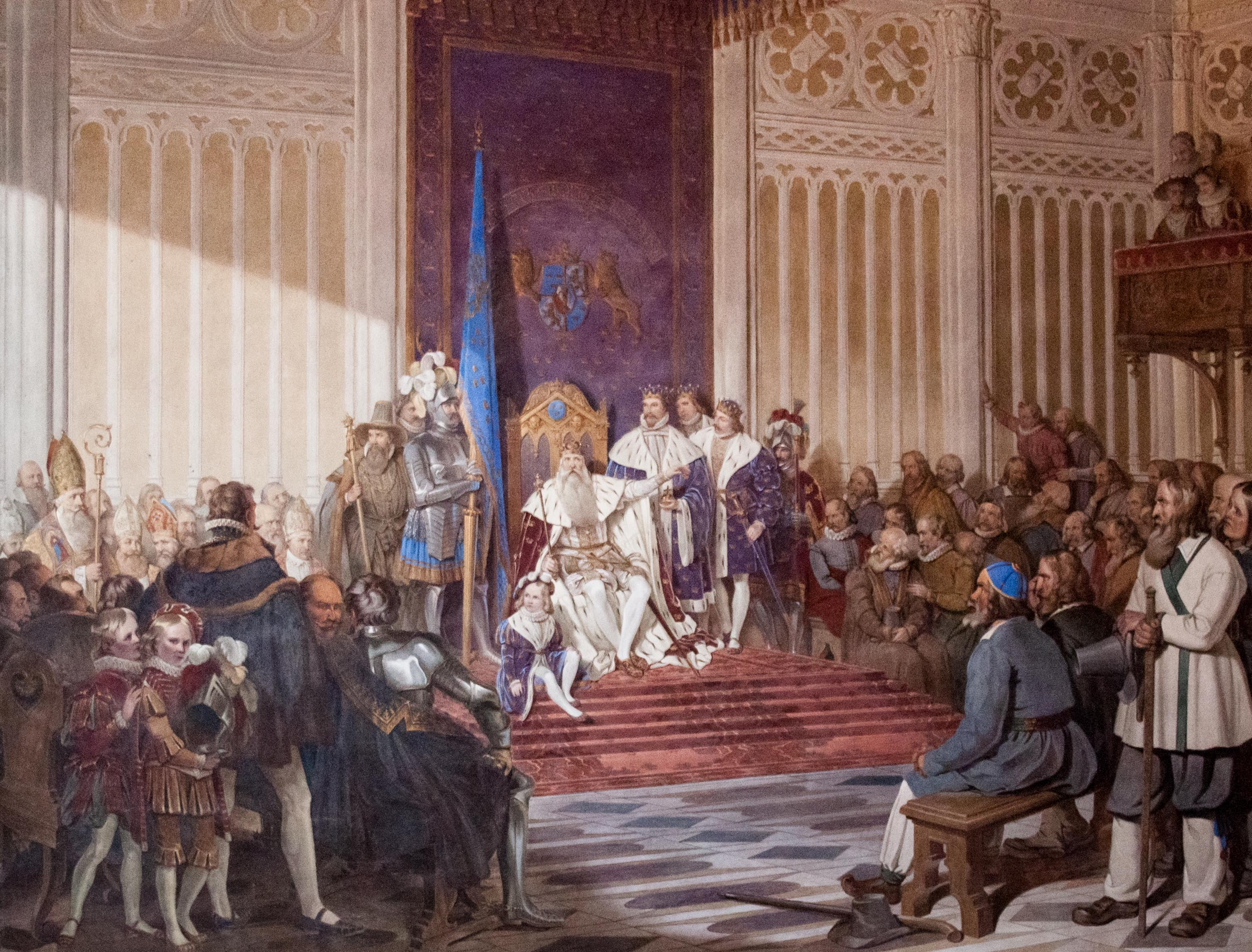

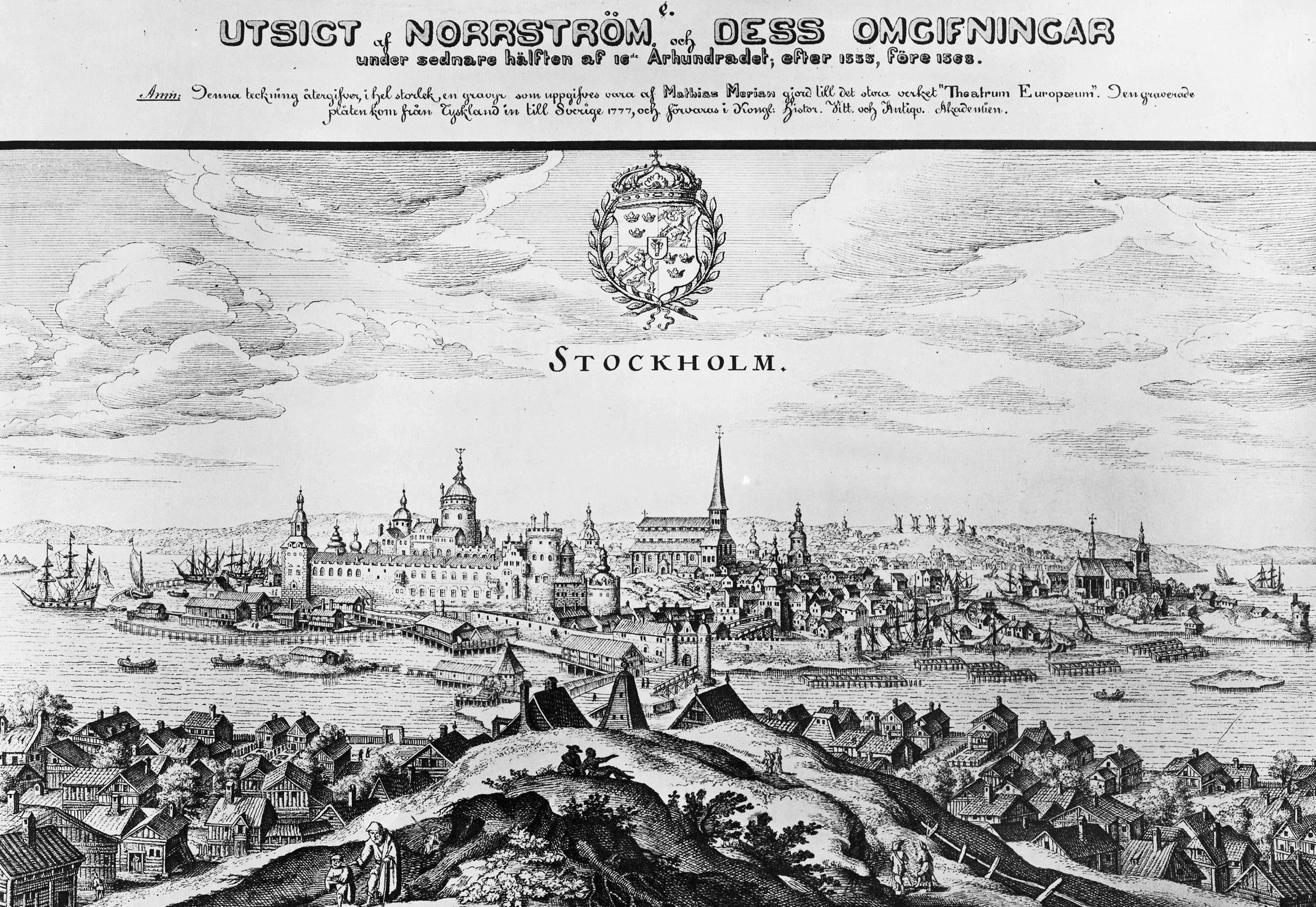
Stockholm, 1555–1565

Events from the year 1560 in Sweden

== Incumbents ==
- Monarch – Gustav Vasa then Eric XIV

== Events ==
- April - Duke John returns home from England with a negative reply to the proposal of Crown Prince Eric to Elizabeth I of England.
- 1 July - The dying king makes his formal farewell to the public.
- 29 September - Gustav Vasa dies and is succeeded by Eric XIV.
- Arch Bishop Laurentius Petri bans priests from baptizing or burying romani.

== Births ==
- Lucretia Gyllenhielm, illegitimate royal daughter (died 1585)
- 13–14 June - Constantia Eriksdotter, illegitimate royal daughter (died 1649)
- Amalia von Hatzfeld, county governor (died 1628)

== Deaths ==
- 29 September - Gustav I, monarch (born 1496). After having suffered from declining health throughout the 1550s, Gustav ultimately died on September 29, 1560, at Tre Kronor castle, Stockholm. Gustav is renowned as the founder of modern Sweden.
