= Birgitta Holm =

Birgitta Holm may refer to:

- Birgitta Holm (author)
- Birgitta Holm (convert)
