= 1638 in Sweden =

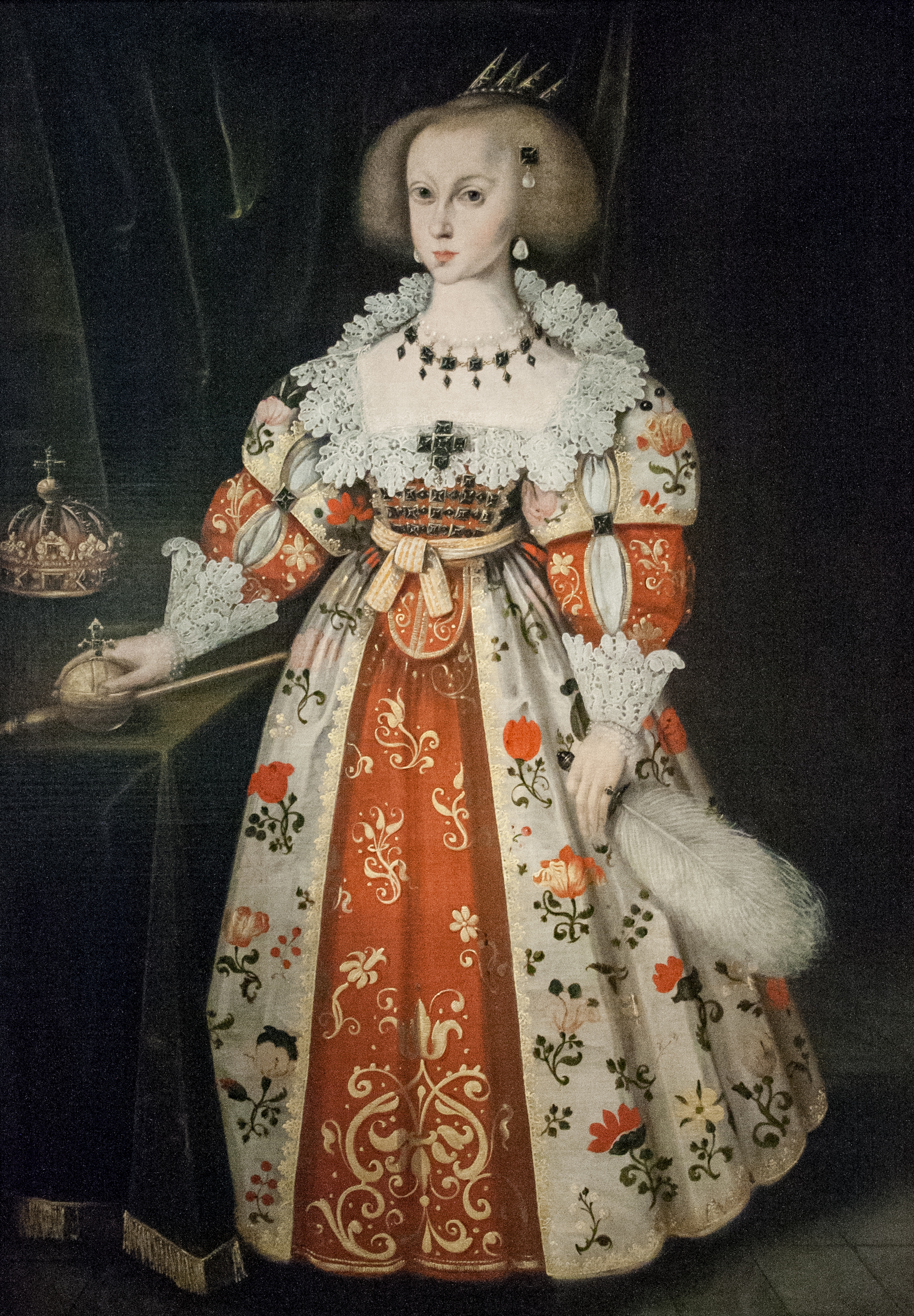
Elbfas - Queen Christina as a Child

Events from the year 1638 in Sweden

== Incumbents ==
- Monarch – Christina

== Events ==
- March 5 – Thirty Years' War – The Treaty of Hamburg is signed by France and Sweden.
- March 29 – Settlers from Sweden arrive on the ships Kalmar Nyckel and Fogel Grip to establish the settlement of New Sweden in Delaware, beginning the Swedish colonization of the Americas.
- September 6 – Posti Group is founded.

== Births ==
- 21 January – Beata Rosenhane, feminist poet (died 1674)
- Lucidor, poet (died 1674)

== Deaths ==
- David Drummond (soldier), Swedish general (born 1593)
- 26 April – Margareta Brahe, courtier (born 1559)
