= 1566 in Sweden =

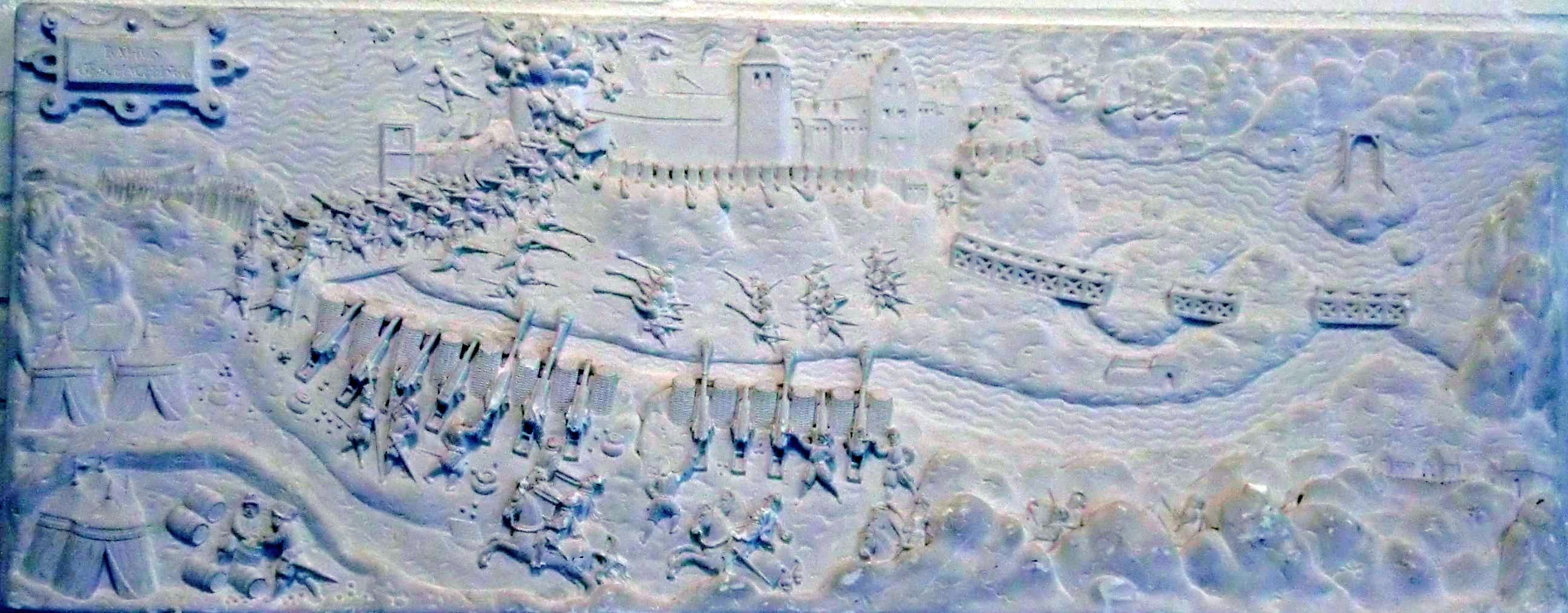
Bohus 1566

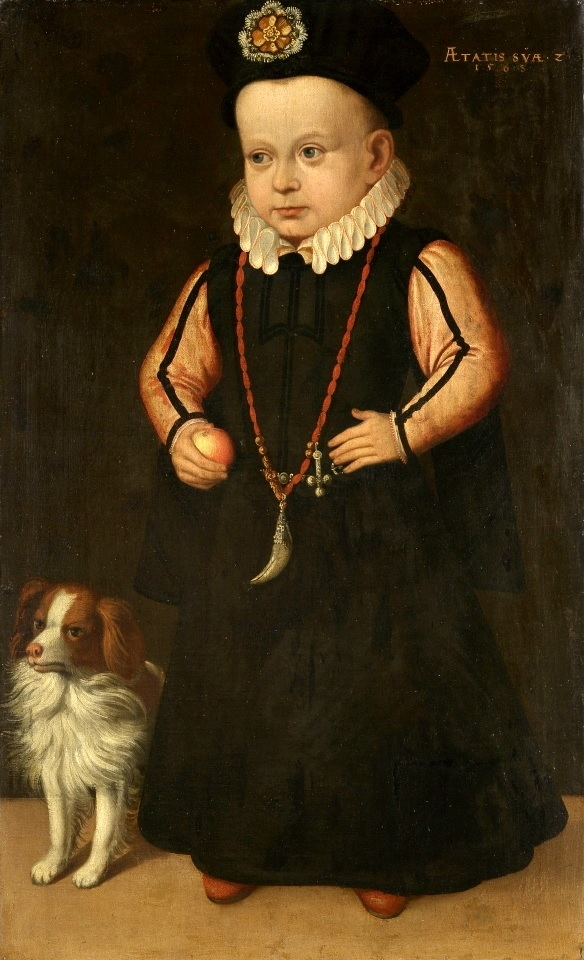
Uther Sigismund Vasa

Events from the year 1566 in Sweden

== Incumbents ==
- Monarch – Eric XIV

== Events ==
- 26 March - 250 Swedes die in an attempt to capture Bohus Fortress.
- June - Nils Svantesson Sture falls from favor with the monarch and are exposed to public humiliation.
- 13 July – The Danes burn Bogesund.
- 15 July – The Danes burn Falköping.
- 23 July – The Danes burn Skara domkyrka.
- 26 July - Action of 26 July 1566
- - Ivan the Terrible ask to have the King's sister-in-law Catherine Jagiellon delivered as a hostage to use against Poland.
- - The Danes under Daniel Rantzau pillage Västergötland, while the Swedes pillage Skåne.

== Births ==
- 20 June - Sigismund III Vasa, monarch (died 1632)
- 15 October - Sigrid of Sweden (1566–1633), princess (died 1633)

== Deaths ==
- September 9 - Klas Horn, naval admiral (born 1517)
- Nils Svantesson Sture (c. 1543–1566): He was a prominent Swedish nobleman, part of the influential Sture family.
- July 26 - 5,900 soldiers drown during a storm near Visby, Gotland.
