= Brita Sophia De la Gardie =

- Born: Brita Sophia De la Gardie; 22 April 1713; Sweden
- Died: 1797 (age 84); Paris, France
- Known for: Amateur actor and culture personality

Brita Sophia De la Gardie (22 April 1713 – 1797) was a Swedish noble and actress who later converted to Catholicism and became a nun. She was a central member of the cultural life in Stockholm in her time. She played a part in the history of Swedish theatre. She was the maternal aunt of Count Axel von Fersen the Younger.

== Life ==
Brita Sophia De La Gardie was born to the politician Count Magnus Julius De la Gardie and the political salonist Hedvig Catharina Lillie. She was the sister-in-law to the scientist Eva Ekeblad.

=== Culture personality ===
During the 1720s and 1730s, amateur theatre was immensely popular in Stockholm and at the royal court. At the time, there were no Swedish language theatre in the capital; only foreign theatre companies performed professionally at the national stage of the Bollhuset Theatre. In 1732, Dom Japhlet d'Arménie by Scarron was performed at the stage of Bollhuset by the noble amateur troupe of Count Carl Gustaf Tessin and Countess Ulla Tessin, who also participated themselves. The most famous one of these amateur troupe was the troupe commonly known as Greve De la Gardies komedianter (The Comedians of Count De la Gardie) (active in 1734–1737), managed by the theatre-interested De la Gardie family.

The De la Gardie amateur theatre performed in the palace Torstensonska huset (later known as now Arvfurstens palats) in the palace Lefebuerska huset and, occasionally, on the stage of Bollhuset Theatre, led by Höpken, between 1734 and 1737. Höpken had returned from Paris in 1734 and organized the troupe to perform more seriously and regularly than the other troupes. Brita Sophia De la Gardie was the lead female actor and star of this troupe. As such, she was well known in the city and a center of its cultural life. Historians have argued whether this troupe performed for the public and can be counted as more than an amateur troupe. According to memoirs, "The whole city" was present at the performances, but the upper-class memoirists may likely have referred to people from their own class. The plays may have been half public, with a symbolic sum paid by the audience, who likely came only from the city's upper-classes.

These amateur troupes created an enthusiasm for native speaking theatre which prepared for the foundation of the first Swedish language national theatre at Bollhuset in 1737. The foundation of the national theatre had been laid by the performance of a student theatre troupe. When the first Swedish national theatre opened in 1737, a suggestion was made (serious or not) to make Brita Sophia an honorary consultant in the theatre management, with a reserved box at the theatre. This never came about. When the first professional actresses were hired to the theatre, it was jokingly suggested that another of the amateur actresses at the De la Gardie troupe, Augusta Törnflycht, should be asked to seek the position. One of the first professional Swedish actresses jointly with Beata Sabina Straas in the theatre troupe on the new national theatre, "Miss Wijkman" are suggested to have been Magdalena Wickman, earlier an employee at the De la Gardie household.

In 1738, Brita Sophia became a member in the board of a musical academy who arranged concerts in the palace Lefebuerska huset.

=== Later life ===
After the death of her father in 1741, Brita Sophia and her mother moved to Paris in France, where they converted to Catholicism. After her mother's death in 1745, she entered a convent and became a nun. She inherited Ekesjö manor in Sweden, but as because of her conversion to Catholicism, which was at that time a crime in Sweden, her property was confiscated and given to her siblings, who sold it. She died in Paris.

Her nephew Axel von Fersen the Younger rented lodgings in the city of Versailles from her between 1785 and 1789. He stayed in the lodgings she provided when he was away from his French regiment in Valenciennes and let family in Sweden believe he stayed in his apartment in Paris, while in reality he was staying in Versailles, either in the lodgings of his aunt, or in lodgings provided for him by queen Marie Antoinette in the royal grounds of the palace of Versailles itself.

== See also ==
- Christina Eleonora Drakenhielm
- Birgitta Holm (convert)
