= Charlotta Berger =

Swedish writer and translator

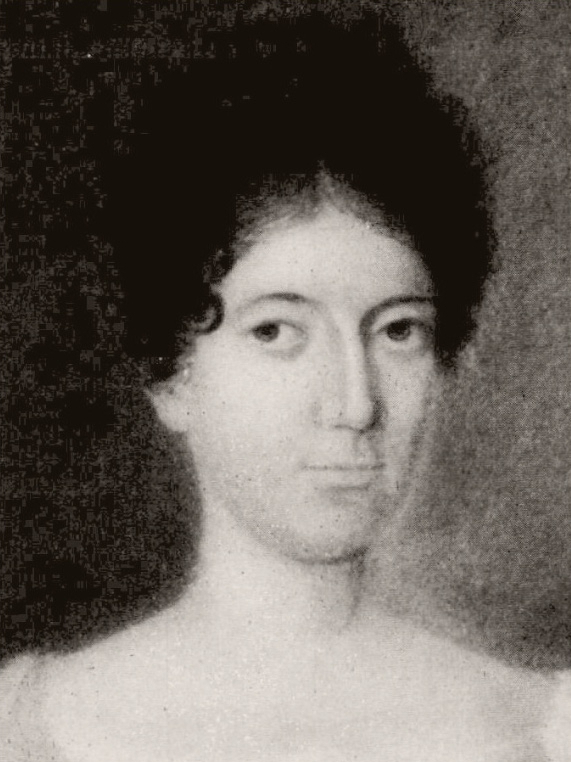
- Born: 21 August 1784; Linköping, Sweden
- Died: 25 May 1852 (aged 67); Linköping, Sweden
- Occupations: Writer, translator, poet, songwriter

Christina Charlotta Ulrika Berger, née Cronhielm af Hakunge (21 August 1784 – 25 May 1852), was a Swedish writer, translator, poet and songwriter.

== Life ==
Charlotta Berger was born in Linköping, the daughter of the major count Carl Emil Cronhielm af Hakunge and Hedvig Ulrika Boije af Gennäs, and the sister of the politician count Otto August Cronhielm. She married the major and composer Johan Göran Berger (1778–1856) in 1817.

Charlotta Berger debuted as a translator of foremost French poems. Early on, she started to publish her own poems in a number of papers, often historical anecdotes in the form of verse. Her composer spouse added music to some of her poems. Her most popular poem has been referred to as "Korset på Idas grav" (The Cross on Ida's Grave) (1816), a ballad printed as a song.

She published several novels which went as serials in among others papers Aftonbladet, and poems in the magazine Magasin för konst, nyheter och moder between 1823 and 1844. Her novels were generally written in the style of sentimental family novels, with heroines in the style of the virtuous and tormented Clarissa by Richardson, and the motive a young love couple who triumphs over the obstacles in their way to a happy marriage. In Sweden, novels were until then normally foreign translations, hers was one of the first examples of knight- and bandit novels in the style of A. Radcliffe. "Lustresan" is mentioned as her perhaps most popular novel. She also wrote two plays, but failed to have them performed in 1842.

== Selected works ==
- "Albert och Louise"
- "Trollgrottan i San Miniatos dal" (1816)
- "Lustresan", 1841
- "Kapten Dunderbergs andra resa" 1843
- "Noveller" (1846)

== Sources ==
- Christina C U Berger (f. Cronhielm), urn:sbl:18587, Svenskt biografiskt lexikon (art av E. Lindström.), hämtad 2015-05-08.
