= Birgitta Holm (convert) =

Birgitta Holm (died after 1755), was a Swedish Roman Catholic convert. She converted from the Lutheran Church of Sweden to Roman Catholicism at a time when this was a serious crime against the state. Holm was the subject of religious prejudice and was probably the only Swede formally banished for having converted to Catholicism in Sweden during the 18th century.

== Background and context ==
According to Swedish law, any Swedish citizen who left the Lutheran Church was punished with banishment, confiscation and forfeiture of the right of inheritance. Most Swedish converts to Catholicism were students living in other areas of Europe. Swedish converts in Sweden, however, were generally women who had married foreign Catholics living in Sweden. Unlike Holm, these women generally escaped punishment.

Holm originally came from Nyköping and then settled in Stockholm. In 1753 she married German Roman Catholic Franz von den Enden, who was a violinist at the Kungliga Hovkapellet. The ceremony took place under the Catholic ritual and was witnessed by von Enden's Catholic friend sculptor Jacques-Philippe Bouchardon and Holm's brother and sister, both Bouchardon's employees. In 1754 her daughter was baptized a Catholic by the priest of the French legation.

== Arrest ==
In 1755, in a consistory of court, which dealt with questions of court staff, it became known that Birgitta Holm had become a Catholic. In the Senate session held on 2 May 1755, she confessed that she had converted to Catholicism for her marriage. Holm specifically mentioned confession as a reason for her conversion. She denied that she regarded Lutheranism as heresy, saying that she did not understand the difference between Lutheran and Catholic teaching. Holm said she was not willing to return to the Lutheran Church unless she was convinced. The Senate then instructed the royal court chaplain, Gabriel Thimotheus Lütkemann, and one of the other preachers in consistory of court, to hold hearings with Holm, in the presence of her husband, to persuade her to return to Lutheranism.

The court consistory met August 13, 1755. They made a statement of the case, recommending to the monarch that von Enden and his spouse be exiled after Holm had refused to retract her conversion.

== Aftermath ==
It is not certain that Holm was exiled, in the absence of confirming documents. Holm's husband Von den Enden remained in Sweden and remained active at the court orchestra until his death in Ulriksdal, in 1769. By then he was remarried.

Facts that support the hypothesis that she was exiled include the fact that the congregation documents of the French Catholic legation do not mention about her after 1755. Eleonora Sibrand, another Swedish convert through marriage to a French Catholic immigrant worker the same year, remained in the documents of her Catholic congregation years after the consistory's failed attempt to force her to recant.

Holm and her daughter did not appear in the papers after the death of her husband, but he had large debts to hometown Hamburg merchants, and she may have settled there at his expense.

In 1736, Märta Forsström, a ladies maid of Ulla Tessin, had converted to Catholicism through her marriage to an Italian Rococo painter, Dominico Francia, and left Sweden for Portugal with her spouse one year after having been trialed in 1743. Forsström, who emigrated voluntarily, was not formally exiled, though she may have left because of the law.

== See also ==
- Brita Sophia De la Gardie
- Christina Eleonora Drakenhielm
