= Henriette Löfman =

Swedish composer

Henriette Löfman (23 August 1784 – 6 March 1836, Örby, Västergötland) was a Swedish composer.

She was married on 15 February 1822 to the nobleman general lieutenant Casimir Reuterskiöld (1770–1848).

She mainly composed works for harp.

== Sources ==
- Nisser, Carl (1943). Svensk instrumentalkomposition 1770–1830. Stockholm: Gothia. Libris 1412043
