= Vänersborg Church =

Church building in Vänersborg, Sweden

Coordinates: 58.3803°N 12.3258°E

- Vänersborgs kyrka
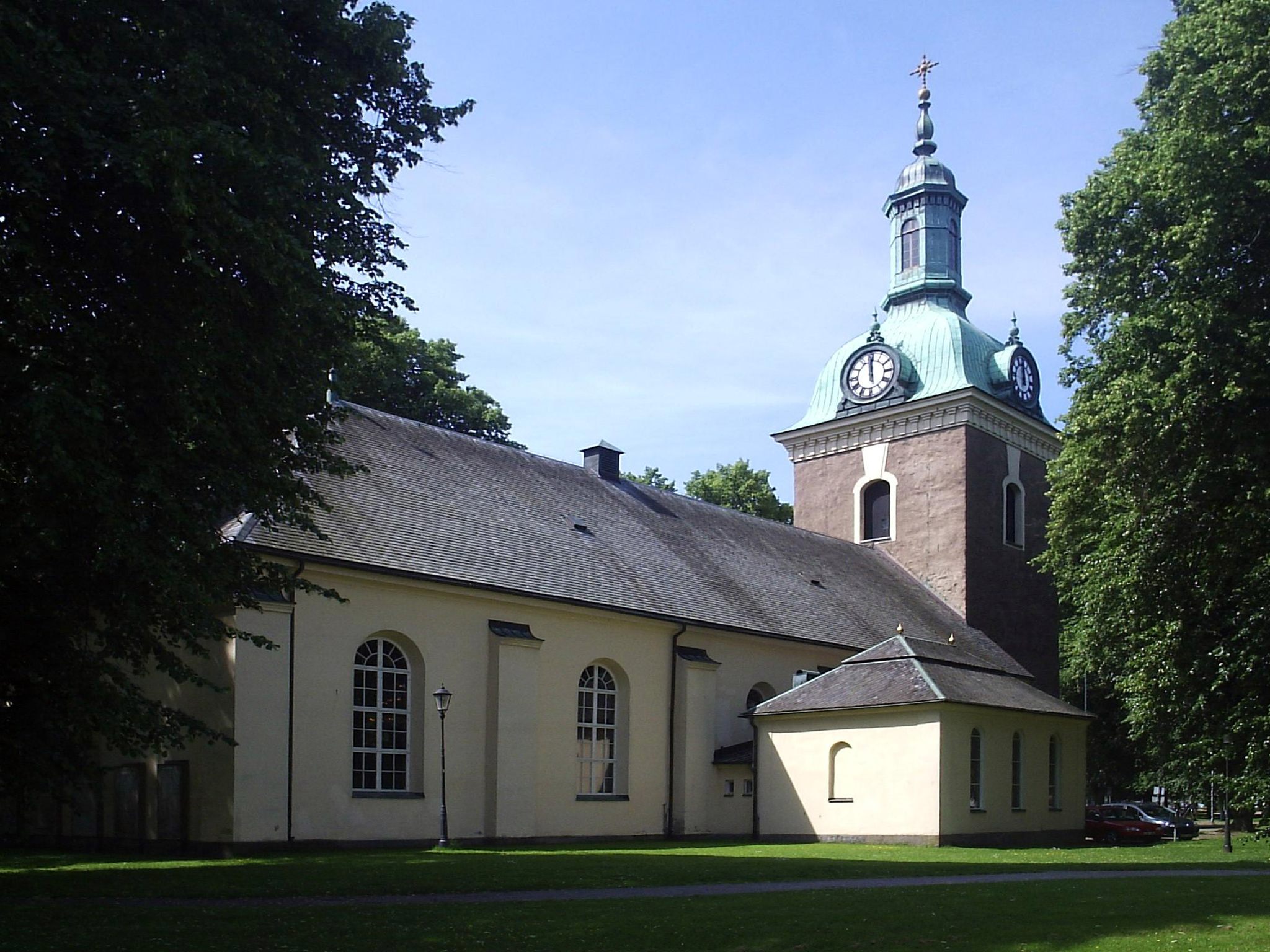
- Vänersborg Church in July 2006
- Vänersborg Church
- Location: Vänersborg
- Country: Sweden
- Denomination: Church of Sweden

History
- Consecrated: 5 August 1784

Architecture
- Architect: Thure Wennberg

Administration
- Diocese: Skara
- Parish: Vänersborg and Väne-Ryr

The Vänersborg Church (Swedish: Vänersborgs kyrka) is a church building in the central parts of Vänersborg, Sweden. Belonging to the Vänersborg and Väne-Ryr Parish of the Church of Sweden, it was built between 1783 and 1784. It was inaugurated on 5 August 1784.
