= Agda Persdotter =

Swedish royal mistress

Agda Persdotter (died after 1565), also known as Agda i Porten ('Agda of the Gate'), was the official royal mistress of the future King Eric XIV of Sweden during his time as a Crown Prince in 1558–1561, and possibly informally in 1563–1565.

== Life ==
The date of her birth and death is unknown. Agda Persdotter was reportedly the daughter of the wealthy merchant and city Councillor Peder Klemetsson, who resided by the gate of St Nicolai in Stockholm and was known as Pher i Porten ('Per of the Gate'), thereby explaining the patronymic as well as the other well known name of Agda: her parentage has, however, not been verified.

=== Kalmar period ===
Agda Persdotter was the first known frilla or mistress of Crown Prince Eric. It is not known when and how their relationship was initiated, but it is confirmed that she departed with him from Stockholm as a part of his household when he left for Kalmar in May 1558, and resided with him as his official mistress at Kalmar Castle. She was a center of his court at Kalmar, known as a beauty and given the sobriquet "Caritas" (Latin: Affection, Love). She had her own apartments at Kalmar Castle, where one of her rooms, Agdas kammare ('Agda Chamber') was named after her and her stay there: the room was situated just beside Eric's audience chamber. Eric is not known to have had any other mistress during his time as a crown prince. The couple had two daughters during these years, for whom Eric had horoscopes made at their birth.

It was at that time customary for a Prince to have a mistress, though it was expected of him to dispose of her when he married by providing her with a pension of property or marriage. Consequently, Eric was expected to terminate the relationship with Agda when he was about to depart for England to propose to queen Elizabeth I of England in the autumn of 1560. On 25 August 1560, Agda was awarded the royal estate Eknaholm outside Växjö, which had belonged to a monastery prior to the Swedish Reformation, and which was to be her pension after the departure of Eric to England. She was also arranged to marry Eric's courtier, the nobleman Joakim Eriksson Fleming (1534–1563), brother of Klaus Fleming.

=== Marriage ===
In September, however, Eric succeeded to the throne as king and cancelled his trip to England. Despite this, his relationship with Agda was terminated and she was married to Fleming. Her marriage was followed by the loss of her children. On 24 September 1561, King Eric XIV transferred the custody of his illegitimate daughters Virginia and Constantia from their mother Agda to his sister Princess Cecilia of Sweden (or more precisely the main lady-in-waiting Anna Hogenskild), stating that of Agda that "I know she is not capable of raising them in good discipline and other things", and authorizing Cecilia to use any force necessary to separate Agda and her daughters. This was in fact an illegal act, as the law secured the mother full custody of her children until the age of three. Agda was granted several properties in Södermanland at her wedding in addition to Eknaholm in Småland. She had one child with Fleming, a daughter Anna, born in 1562.

=== Later life ===
She was widowed at the death of Fleming in 1563. After she was widowed, King Eric reportedly resumed his relationship with her. However, if this is correct, this time the relationship was not official, nor exclusive: between 1561 and 1565, King Eric had a collective of mistresses referred to as Frillohopen ('The Crowd of Mistresses') consisting of Anna Larsdotter, Karin Jacobsdotter, Karin Pedersdotter, Sigrid Nilsdotter, Doredi Valentinsdotter as well as Britta and Ingrid whose patronymics are not known. She is pointed out as the mother of Lucretia, an illegitimate daughter born to Eric from one of these mistresses, but it is in fact unknown which one of these mistresses who was the mother of Lucretia, and it is uncertain whether Agda was indeed the king's mistress at all during this period, as it has not been confirmed.

In 1565, Eric replaced all his previous mistresses with Karin Månsdotter, previously one of the servants looking after Agda's daughter Virginia. The later life of Agda Persdotter is not verified, but according to unverified accounts, she married the nobleman Christoffer Olofsson Stråle of Sjöared, royal commandant of Stegeholm Castle and Söderköping Castle.

== Children ==
- Virginia Eriksdotter (1559–1633) (living descendants)
- Constantia Eriksdotter (1560–1649) (living descendants)
- Anna Fleming (1562- )
- Lucretia Eriksdotter (1564–after 1574) died young (possibly a daughter of Eric by another mistress)
