= Erik Gabrielsson Emporagrius =

Swedish professor and bishop

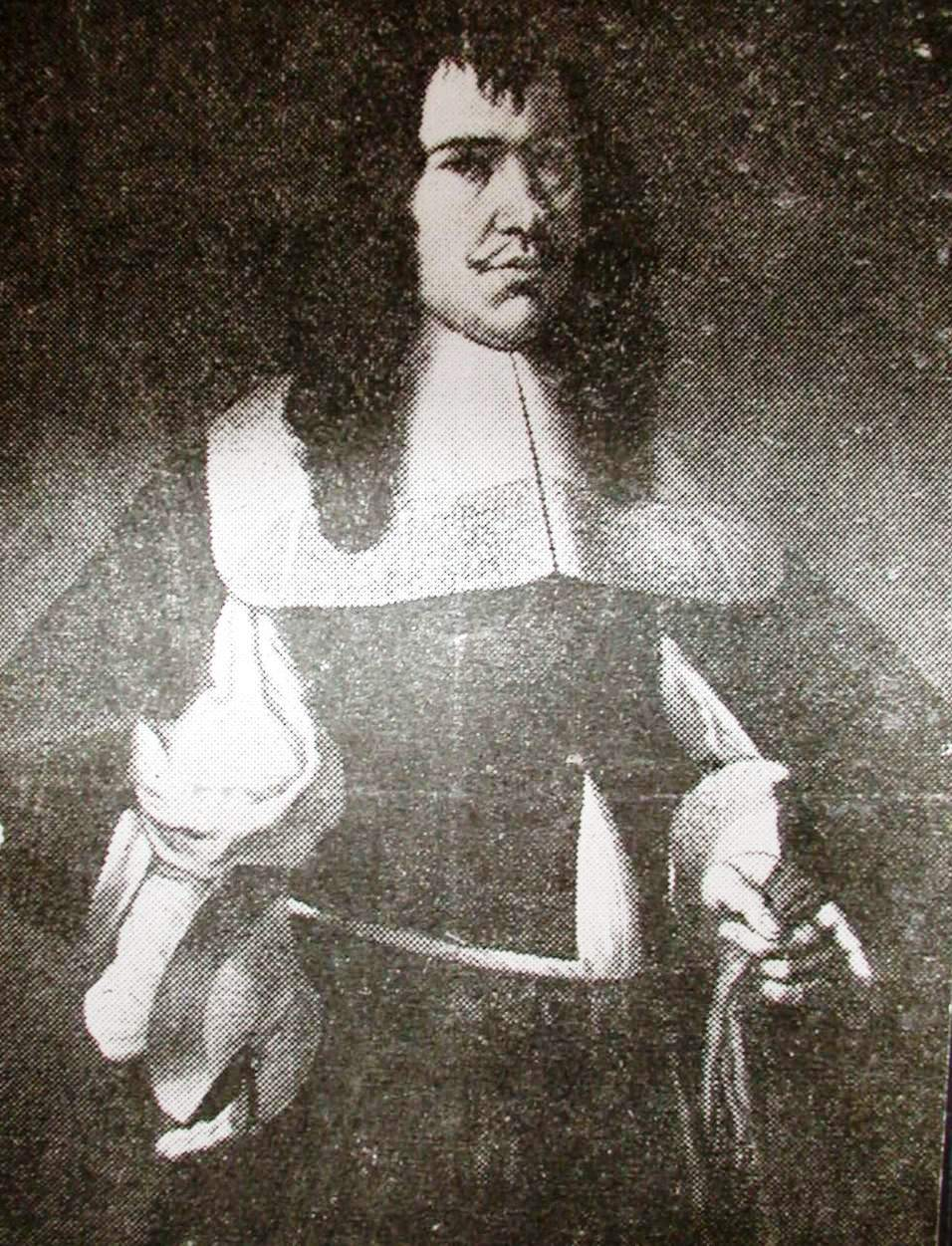

Erik Gabrielsson Emporagrius (1606 – 14 March 1674) was a Swedish professor and bishop.

Erik Emporagrius was born in Torsåker in Gästrikland, son of Gabriel Emporagrius, the vicar there. He studied at Uppsala University, where he was awarded a master's degree in 1632, and at universities abroad. On his return to Sweden in 1637, he was appointed professor of physics at Uppsala, but after a few years he exchanged this position for a chair in the faculty of theology. In 1645 he was appointed first court chaplain to Queen Christina, in 1649 pastor primarius in Stockholm, and in 1664 Bishop of Strängnäs.

The previous Bishop of Strängnäs, Johannes Matthiae Gothus, had based on some of his publications been accused of attacking the symbolic books and suspected of wishing to bring about a union of the Lutheran and Reformed Churches. Emporagrius came to be one of his opponents, and the outcome of the conflict was that the old bishop, half by his own wish and half by official decision, was removed from office and replaced by Emporagrius. He held the see for ten years, until his death.

Emporagrius was a learned and industrious man, and as a theologian was a zealous guardian of orthodoxy in the Lutheran Church. Several writings of his are extant, among them Admonitio consolat ad obeundam pio et constanti animo mortem (1629), Methodus Theologiæ (1647), Likpredikningar (Sermons for the Dead, 1653–60), Oratio pro reddita Pace (1664) and Catechesens enfaldige förklarning (Simple Explanation of the Catechism, 1669). In the last, in his explanation of the Tenth Commandment he commented that a wife should be considered the finest item in a man's possessions or moveable property, which so annoyed Dowager Queen Hedvig Eleonora of Holstein-Gottorp that she obtained a ban on the work.

He was married first to Sara Eriksdotter Simtelia, secondly in 1648 to Elisabeth Olivecrantz, daughter of Laurentius Paulinus Gothus, Archbishop of Uppsala, and for the third time to Anna Depchen. His son Gabriel Emporagrius, born in 1639, was ennobled in 1668 with the name Lillieflycht on account of his father's services. Erik Emporagrius died in Strängnäs on 14 March 1674.
