= Helena Ehrenmalm =

Finnish landowner

Helena Ehrenmalm (1730-1784) was a Finnish landowner of note.

Helena Ehrenmalm married Lieutenant Colonel Josias Ehrenmalm and managed the Bastön manor at Finström as a widow. During the 1770s, she was respected for her inventive management of her estate: regarded as an agrarian role model, it was suggested that she be given a medal of the Patriotic Society for her achievements. Among her projects was to provide her workers with instruction in spinning linen.
