= Beata Rosenhane =

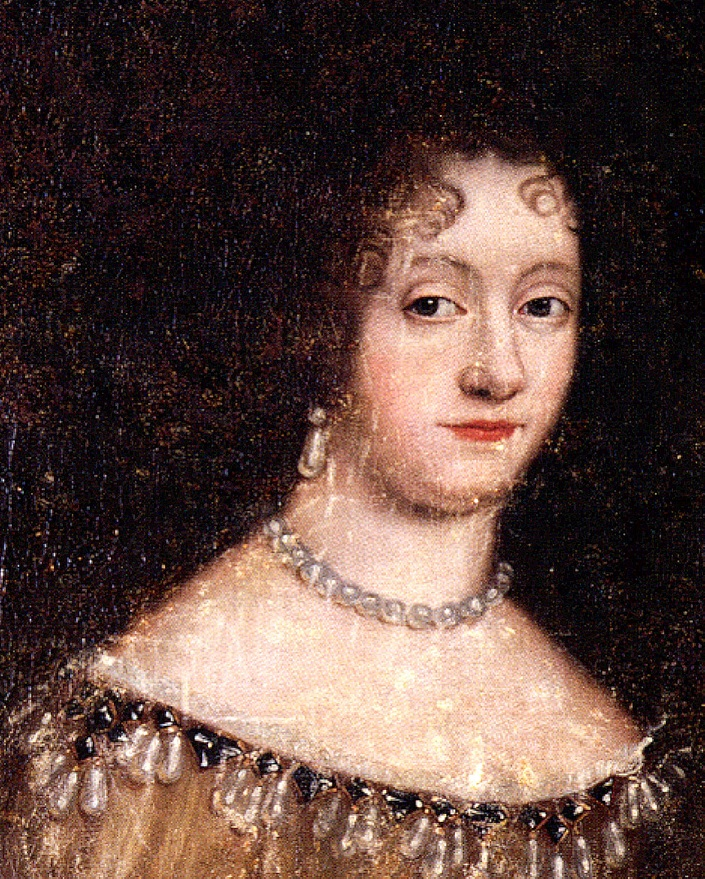
Beata Rosenhane

Beata Rosenhane (21 January 1638 in Norrköping – 1 June 1674) was a Swedish Baroness and writer. She was known for her learning and received an education unusual for a female of her epoch, and has as such been the subject of research.

== Biography ==
Beata Rosenhane was the daughter of Beata Sparre and the diplomat Baron Schering Rosenhane. As a Swedish diplomat, her father was stationed abroad at several occasions, and it is believed that it was during his visit to Paris in France during the age of the Précieuses, when it was the fashion in France to educate females, that he decided to give his daughters equal education to that of his sons, something unique at the time at least in Sweden. The result was that his daughters are counted as the most learned and educated females in 17th-century Sweden alongside Queen Christina. This was particular the case of Beata, who apparently was the most gifted among her sisters. From the age of seven onward, she was trained in rhetoric by conversation and by writing essays in various subjects in which she was also, in parallel, educated. She also wrote poetry and acquired a literary reputation, though her poems were not published: "She had a rare talent, wide knowledge and great learning in the literature of foreign countries and had herself attempted poetry, though none of her writings has been printed". Her poems as well as her written study work and books have been preserved and are an object of research.

Beata Rosenhane long refused to marry, though she was, after the death of her father in 1663, pressured by her family to do so. She explained that she had seen many fiances become husbands and that she did not believe them capable of any love which could give a woman happiness: that she believed that a marriage should be founded on love and that the man selected by her family was not to her taste and would not be able to pass the test and love her. Eventually, she saw herself forced to give in because of the alternative as a spinster, which would be even less independent than that of a wife. In accordance to the contemporary civil law, an unmarried woman regardless of age were placed under the guardianship under her closest male relative for life; and though a married woman was under the guardianship of her husband, she obtained legal majority as a widow. Before her marriage, she pointed out to her brother, that she gave in and agreed to marry only because as a spinster, she would not have the power to live by herself and do as she pleased, and that she would have been able to so, had she been born a male. She admitted that between the alternative of a wife and a spinster, the former was the better of two evils: "You do of course find it necessary to realize, that an unmarried woman would be far worse off than an unhappily married one".

In 1671, she finally married colonel lieutenant Baron Erik Ribbing af Zernava (1640-1675). As was the custom in the Swedish nobility until the late 18th century, she kept her own name after marriage. She died childless of fever. Her brother, who disliked her way of thinking, decided that her independence had been caused by her education, and resolved that his own daughter would be raised without any education to become a woman without will.

== See also ==
- Vendela Skytte

== Sources ==
- Norrhem, Svante (2007). Kvinnor vid maktens sida : 1632-1772. Lund: Nordic Academic Press. Libris 10428618. ISBN 978-91-89116-91-7
- Ann Öhrberg (2001). Vittra fruntimmer. Författarroll och retorik hos frihetstidens kvinnliga författare. Stockholm: Gidlunds Förlag. ISBN 91-7844-330-X
- Stina Hansson: Salongsretorik : Beata Rosenhane (1638–74), hennes övningsböcker och den klassiska retoriken = [Rhetoric for the salons] : [Beata Rosenhane (1638–74), her exercise books, and classical rhetoric] /
- http://www.stockholmskallan.se/Soksida/Post/?nid=5332
- Scheutz, Lisbet, Berömda och glömda stockholmskvinnor : sju stadsvandringar : 155 kvinnoporträtt. - 2001. - S. 127-131
- Svenska adelns ättar-taflor / Afdelning 3. von Nackreij - Skytte /
- Stånd och genus i stormaktstidens Sverige, Kekke Stadin
- http://www.adelsvapen.com/genealogi/Rosenhane_nr_29
