= Christina Eleonora Drakenhielm =

Christina Eleonora Drakenhielm (1649–1712), was a Swedish noble and convert. Her conversion to Catholicism in 1664 was a scandal in contemporary Sweden, where the act was punishable by death.

Christina Eleonora Drakenhielm was the daughter of the noble Wilhelm Drakenhielm and Elsa von Brandt. She was described as defiant and unruly, and in 1664, she accompanied Maria Sofia De la Gardie to Aachen, where she was placed in a Catholic convent to be schooled in needlework, language and virtue.

In the abbey, however, the nuns convinced her to convert to the Catholic faith and join the order as a nun. De la Gardie tried to force the nuns to have her returned, and was even assisted by a diplomat of the German Roman Empire, but without success.

In 1669, however, Drakenhielm escaped from the convent and returned to Sweden herself. She was interrogated by bishop Zakarias Klingenstierna in Malmö, and renounced Catholicism and adopted Lutheranism. She was trialed, but spared from the death penalty by Charles XI 7 November 1670. After this, she married noble Erik Appelgren.

== See also ==
- Brita Sophia De la Gardie
- Birgitta Holm (convert)
