= Brita Laurelia =

Swedish poet

Brita Laurelia (1712–1784) was a Swedish publicist, book printer, poet and publisher. She was the owner and director of the Kungliga Amiralitetsboktryckeriet ('Royal Admiralty Printing Press') in Karlskrona and the publisher of the newspaper Carlskrona Weckoblad ('Karlskrona Weekly') in 1754-1758 och 1766-1769, as a widow between her two marriages.

== Life ==
She was a published author of poetry, and contributed as an editor in several papers and magazines. She married the book printer Johan Vinqvist (1714–1754), owner of the Kungliga Amiralitetsboktryckeriet ('Royal Amiralty Printing Press') in Karlskrona.

In 1754, her spouse founded the newspaper Carlskrona Weckoblad ('Karlskrona Weekly'). When he died just a few months later, she took over the printshop as well as the newspaper, and managed it with success. When she remarried lieutenant Anders Tranfelt (d. 1766) in 1758, she was no longer visible as manager because married women were minors under the law and their business activity were not visible in public documents as their property were at least formally their husbands. When she was widowed in 1766, she was again visible as managing editor and publisher of the newspaper as well as manager of the printing press.

When her daughter and heir Maria Christina Vinqvist (d. 1821) married Paul Strandell (d. 1785), Brita Laurelia choose to retire and turned over her business to her son-in-law. Her daughter was to repeat the career of her mother: Maria Christina Vinqvist became the manager of the newspaper as well as manager of the printing business when she was widowed in 1785; became invisible when she remarried Carl Fromhold Swinhufvud (d. 1818) in 1790 and managed the business again when she was widowed a second time, and left it to her daughter Beata Ulrika Flygare.
