= Virginia Eriksdotter =

Swedish noble (1559–1633)

Virginia Eriksdotter (1 January 1559 – 1633) was a Swedish noble. She was a recognized illegitimate daughter of King Erik XIV of Sweden and his official royal mistress Agda Persdotter.

== Life ==
Virginia was born at Kalmar Castle during her father's tenure as governor of Kalmar. In 1560, her father became king. She and her sister Constantia Eriksdotter (1560–1649) were removed from their mother's custody when she married in 1561. This was illegal, as according to the law, their mother had sole custody until the children reached the age of three. They were placed under the responsibility of Princess Cecilia of Sweden and (after her marriage in 1564) Princess Elizabeth of Sweden or, more precisely, the head-lady-in-waiting, Anna Hogenskild. The following year, Karin Månsdotter was included in their staff, and two years later, she became their stepmother.

In 1566, her father suggested that she marry Tsarevich Ivan Ivanovich of Russia. This was at a point when her father forged an alliance between Sweden and Russia against Poland; other considerations mentioned were the handover of Queen Dowager Catherine, Princess Sophia of Sweden and Princess Elizabeth of Sweden as hostages to Russia. The seven-year-old Virginia was reportedly displeased when she was informed of the plans for her future marriage and refused. Concerning her age, a marriage would in any event have not been realized for years, and her father was deposed but two years later.

Despite her age, she as well as Karin Månsdotter were the object of the appeals from Martha Leijonhufvud, who asked them to appeal to the king for the mercy of Martha's spouse and sons prior to the Sture Murders, as Martha herself had been placed in house arrest. Martha suggested to Karin that she use "Miss Virginia" as a messenger if that would be the most effective method of success, but she did also appeal to the eight-year-old Virginia personally. In 1568, Virginia's father was deposed by her uncle, John III of Sweden.

On 7 May 1585, Virginia was granted estates in Västergötland by her uncle, King John III of Sweden, and the following year, she herself chose to marry the nobleman Håkan Knutsson Hand, governor of Kronoberg Castle. In 1589, she was granted further estates by the future King Charles IX of Sweden in his Duchy of Södermanland. She had seven children during her marriage who all survived to mature adulthood.

== Sources ==
- Gustaf Elgenstierna : Den introducerade svenska adelns ättartavlor. 1925-36
- Lars-Olof Larsson : Arvet efter Gustav Vasa
- Tegenborg Falkdalen, Karin, Vasadrottningen: en biografi över Katarina Stenbock 1535-1621 [The Vasa Queen: A biography of Catherine Stenbock, 1535-1621], Historiska media, Lund, 2015
