= Constantia Eriksdotter =

Illegitimate daughter of Eric XIV of Sweden

Constantia Eriksdotter (1560–1649) was an illegitimate daughter of Eric XIV of Sweden and Agda Persdotter. She was called "The Queen of Tiveden".

== Life ==
Constantia Eriksdotter and her sister Virginia were removed from their mother's custody when she married in 1561. This was illegal, as according to the law, their mother had sole custody until the children reached the age of three. They were placed first in the court of Princess Cecilia of Sweden, then that of Princess Elizabeth of Sweden (1564), and finally that of queen Karin Månsdotter. In 1573, she visited her deposed father in prison and was possibly the last family member to see him alive.

On 13 January 1594, she married the English nobleman Henry Frankelin, a courtier of her uncle Charles IX of Sweden. The same year, she was awarded nine estates in Väne parish in Bohuslän by her cousin, King Sigismund III Vasa. In 1595, she was further granted Bocksjö Manor in the parish of Tiveden in Västergötland, where she chose to reside. As a widow after 1610, she mainly lived at Odenfors gard in Linköpings kommun outside Vreta. She died at Östergötland and was buried together with her husband at Undenäs Old Church in Undenäs parish (Undenäs socken) in Skaraborg County. A moonstone belonging to Constantia is still kept in the Undenäs church.

== Issue ==
1. Carl Frankelin (d. 1631), a major who fell at Greifswald when it was occupied under the Treaty of Stettin.
2. Johan Frankelin
3. Maria Catharina Frankelin (d. 1661), married to governor and nobleman Anders Koskull (1594-1676)
4. Elisabet Frankelin (d. 1655), married to Christian Frost (d. 1631)

== Other Sources ==
- Gadd, Pia: Frillor, fruar och herrar - en okänd kvinnohistoria Falun 2009 (Swedish)
- Neander Gustaf. Constantia Eriksdotter. En konungadotter i Tivedsbygden. 1941. (Swedish)
- Elgenstiernas Ättartavlor II sid. 817. (Swedish)
- Svenskt Biografiskt Lexikon XVI sid. 421–422. (Swedish)
- Wikenros, Ingemar: Constantia Eriksdotter: Kungadottern på Bocksjöholm och Odensfors. Mariestad 1992. (Swedish)
- Wikenros, Ingemar: Kungadottern Constantia Eriksdotter: Ättlingar och gårdar i Undenäsbygden. Mariestad 2010.
- Riddarhusets Stamtavlor på cd-rom (med kompletteringar och rättelser) (Swedish)
